= Gospel Church =

Gospel Church may refer to:

- Gospel Church, Chengdu
- Gospel Church, Guanghan
- Gospel Church, Jiangyou
- Gospel Church, Kangding
- Gospel Church, Langzhong
- Gospel Church, Mianyang
- Gospel Church, Mianzhu
- Gospel Church, Santai
- Gospel Church, Wanzhou
- Gospel Church, Zhenjiang
