= Arthur Curtis (rugby union) =

Irish rugby union player

- Full name: Arthur Bryan Curtis
- Born: 27 March 1924 Shanghai, China
- Died: 17 April 1989 (aged 65)
- University: University of Oxford
- Notable relative(s): John Curtis (father); David Curtis (son); Angus Curtis (grandson)
- Occupation: Headmaster

Rugby union career
- Position: Wing-forward
International career
Years	Team	Apps	(Points)
1950	Ireland	3	(3)

Arthur Bryan Curtis (27 March 1924 – 17 April 1989) was an Irish international rugby union player.

== Biography ==
Born in Shanghai, Curtis was the youngest son of Irish missionary John Curtis, who became Bishop of Chekiang. He spent his childhood in England after being sent there with his siblings to live with an uncle while their parents remained in China until after the war. As a wing-forward, Curtis played rugby for London Irish and Oxford University, winning three Ireland caps during the 1950 Five Nations against France, England and Scotland.

Curtis later immigrated to Rhodesia, where his son David (a 1990s Ireland centre) was born. One of his grandsons, Angus, was an Ulster player, and another, Graham, has represented Ireland in rugby sevens.

== See also ==
- List of Ireland national rugby union players
