= Donnithorne =

Donnithorne is a surname. Notable people with the surname include:

- Audrey Donnithorne (1922–2020), British-Chinese political economist and missionary
- Don Donnithorne (1926–2016), New Zealand architect
- Eliza Emily Donnithorne (1821–1886), Australian woman
- John Donnithorne Taylor (1798–1885), member of the Taylor-Walker brewing family
- Vyvyan Donnithorne (1886–1968), Archdeacon of Western Szechwan
