= Holy Trinity Church, Shanghai =

- Holy Trinity Cathedral
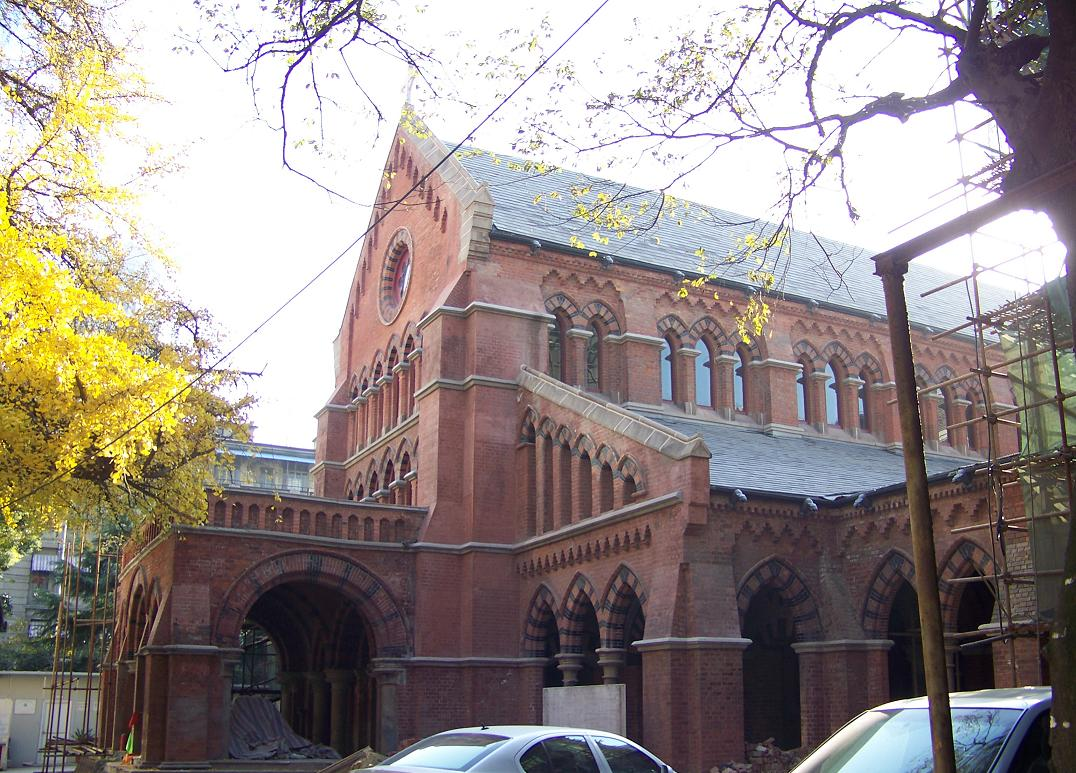
- Holy Trinity Church during renovations
- Holy Trinity Church, Shanghai
- 31°14′18.5″N 121°28′55″E
- Location: Huangpu District, Shanghai
- Country: China
- Denomination: Chinese Protestant
- Previous denomination: Anglican

History
- Status: Church prev. cathedral
- Founded: Mid 19th century
- Dedication: Holy Trinity

Architecture
- Functional status: Active
- Architect: George Gilbert Scott
- Style: Gothic Revival
- Groundbreaking: 1866
- Completed: 1869

Administration
- Province: China (formerly)
- Diocese: Chekiang (formerly)

Holy Trinity Church, Shanghai (simplified Chinese: 上海圣三一堂; traditional Chinese: 上海聖三一堂; pinyin: Shànghǎi shèng sānyī táng), is a Protestant (and formerly Anglican) church in Huangpu District of Shanghai.

The church, consecrated in 1869 was designed in a Gothic Revival style by British architect Sir George Gilbert Scott. After 1875, upon the appointment of Bishop William Russell as the first Church of England Bishop in the Diocese of North China, the church was commonly referred to as a cathedral, and the senior priest was known as the Dean. This cathedral designation was however mainly by way of common convention than fact as the titular bishop of the Anglican Communion located in Shanghai at the time was Channing Moore Williams of the Episcopal Church.

The church has recently undergone restoration and has been serving as the main church and headquarters of the Three-Self Patriotic Movement in Shanghai since 2006. However, as of June 2018, the church was still not open for worship. The bookshop located in the former school, however, remained open.

== History ==
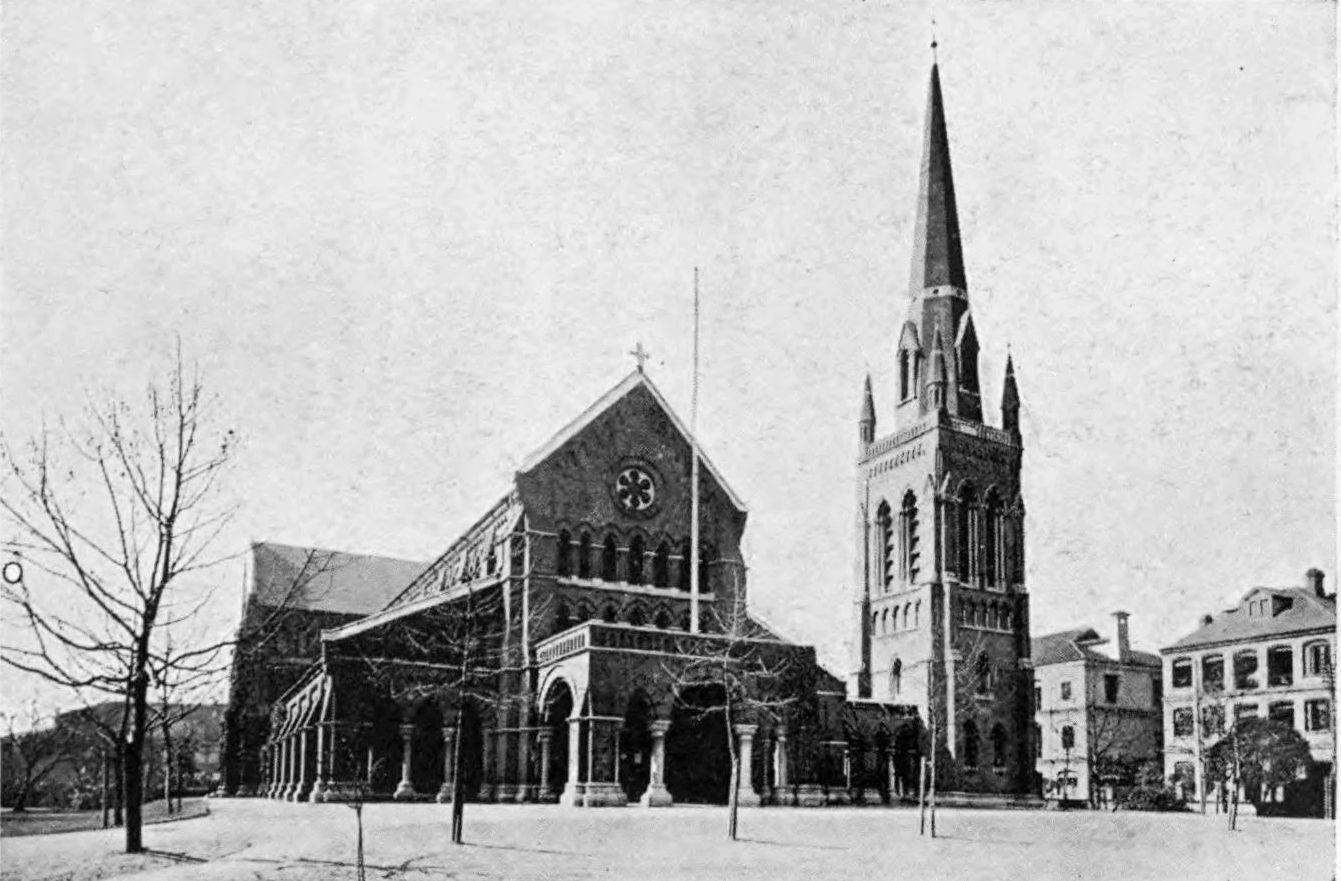
Holy Trinity Church, Shanghai pictured in 1908

Prior to the construction and dedication of Holy Trinity in 1847, church services attended by the British community were held in the British Consulate. Thomas Chaye Beale of Dent & Co. purchased and donated the current site of Holy Trinity as a gift to the church. The first church structure on the site was of poor quality; the roof collapsing, following intense rainfall, on 24 June 1850.

The neo-Gothic design of the current church by Sir George Gilbert Scott, was modified by William Kidner, a junior architect in Scott's office due to budget constraints and in an effort to accommodate a growing congregation. The foundation stone was laid in 1866 and the church was eventually dedicated in 1869. The laying of the foundation stone was a grand public event. A procession for the event starting from the nearby Masonic Hall heading to the cathedral site, and the laying of the stone was a full Masonic ceremony under the direction and superintendence of the Provincial Grand Lodge of China. A spire was added to the original tower in 1901 although this was later removed during the Cultural Revolution. Holy Trinity faces Jerusalem, which is roughly in the west. When introduced in 1914, the church had the largest organ in Asia an instrument supplied by J. W. Walker & Sons Ltd of London.

Before the forced amalgamation of Anglican denominations in mainland China into the lianghui in 1958, the church served as the cathedral of the Anglican Church in China, known as Holy Trinity Cathedral (traditional Chinese: 聖三一主敎座堂; simplified Chinese: 圣三一主教座堂; pinyin: Shèngsānyī Zhujiaozuotáng), and the oldest such cathedral in China. It was colloquially known as "the Red Church". It was the English speaking Anglican church of Shanghai in 1866–1949. It also had a boys' school attached, built in 1928. This was attended by the author JG Ballard in his youth, and it features in his novel, Empire of the Sun. The 1st Shanghai Baden-Powell Group was based there. Later, it became the cathedral of the Diocese of Chekiang in 1930, still an English speaking church.

== Location ==
Its address is 201, Jiujiang Road. The nearest station on the Shanghai Metro is Nanjing Rd East Station. It has a separate carillon.

== Renovations ==
Its spire was destroyed during the cultural revolution and has since been restored. During the Cultural Revolution, it was confiscated by the Huangpu District authorities and converted into a cinema. A stage was installed in the chancel, a second floor and sloping floor were introduced and the brickwork was covered by plaster and painted. Peter Hibbard, who described it as "a central feature of British life in a faraway land," was consulted in its restoration. The restoration was carried out by Zhang Ming Architectural Design Firm. Carved teak pews were provided by a furniture factory in Zhejiang province. The church was reopened in December 2017.

== Current use ==
It now serves as the headquarters of the Three-Self Patriotic Movement, having been used for police offices and the exit visa bureau. The church complex was handed back to the lianghui in 2006.

== Marriages ==
- Kenneth Bevan
- Alfred Brooke-Smith
- William Cassels
- William Herbert Vacher
- Hiram Parkes Wilkinson
- Louie Yim-qun
- Henry Jackson Yue
- Margaret Williamson King
