= Holy Cross Church, Wanzhou =

- 聖十字堂
- Location: 181 Tianlong Road, Wanzhou District, Chongqing
- Country: China
- Denomination: Three-Self Church (Protestant)
- Previous denomination: Lutheran

History
- Status: Church
- Founded: 1923
- Founder: George Oliver Lillegard
- Dedication: Holy Cross

Architecture
- Functional status: Active
- Style: Gothic Revival

Clergy
- Pastor: Liu Xiaolin

Holy Cross Church (Note: traditional Chinese: 聖十字堂; simplified Chinese: 圣十字堂; pinyin: Shèngshízì táng; Wade–Giles: Shêng^{4}-shih^{2}-tzu^{4} tʽang^{2}; Sichuanese romanization: Shen^{4} Shï^{5} Tsï^{4} Tʽang^{2}.) is a Protestant church situated on Tianlong Road in Wanzhou District, Chongqing. It was founded in 1923 by an American Lutheran missionary, Rev George Oliver Lillegard (1888–1965). It has been subjected to the control of the state-sanctioned Three-Self Patriotic Church since 1954.

== History ==
In 1923, when George Oliver Lillegard—an Iowa-born pastor sent by the Missouri Evangelical Lutheran Mission—arrived in Wanzhou (then known as Wanhsien [Wan County], was part of Sichuan Province) to set up a small mission station in the Robert Dollar Building, Protestantism had already been introduced to the region by Anglican missionaries in the late 19th century. The Anglican Gospel Church was built in 1901.

In 1925, part of Lillegard's residence at Gaosuntang Residential District, was converted into a chapel named Holy Cross Church. The church became one of the county's main venues for Protestant worship the next year, after its relocation to Banbian Street. Lillegard served in the church until 1927, when the Wanhsien incident forced all Americans out of Sichuan and Hubei. Kuang Uan-yi, a local missionary, had laboured for the congregation since then.

The congregation had over 100 members by 1939, the number had decreased drastically after the Second Sino-Japanese War (1937–1945). By the time of the communists' takeover of Sichuan in late 1949, there were only a dozen or so Lutherans in the entire county.

After the communist takeover of China in 1949, Christian Churches in China were forced to sever their ties with respective overseas Churches, which has thus led to the merging of Holy Cross Church into the communist-established Three-Self Patriotic Church.

In 2005, in order to support Three Gorges Project, the church was moved to its present location and rebuilt in neo-Gothic style.

== See also ==
- Protestantism in Sichuan
- Dalian Lutheran Church
- Harbin German Lutheran Church
- Lutheran Church of China
