= Gospel Church, Wanzhou =

- 福音堂
- Location: 372 Tiantai Road, Wanzhou District, Chongqing
- Country: China
- Denomination: Three-Self Church (Protestant)
- Previous denomination: Anglican
- Churchmanship: Low church evangelical

History
- Status: Church

Architecture
- Functional status: Active
- Style: Romanesque Revival
- Years built: 1901

Administration
- Province: China (formerly)
- Diocese: Szechwan (formerly); East Szechwan (formerly; since 1936)

Clergy
- Pastor: Huang Rundong

Gospel Church (Note: Chinese: 福音堂; pinyin: Fúyīn táng; Wade–Giles: Fu^{2}-yin^{1} tʽang^{2}; Sichuanese romanization: Fu^{5} In^{1} Tʽang^{2}.) is a Protestant church situated on Tiantai Road in Wanzhou District, Chongqing. Built in 1901, it was formerly an Anglican church in the Diocese of East Szechwan. It has been subjected to the control of the state-sanctioned Three-Self Patriotic Church since 1954.

== History ==
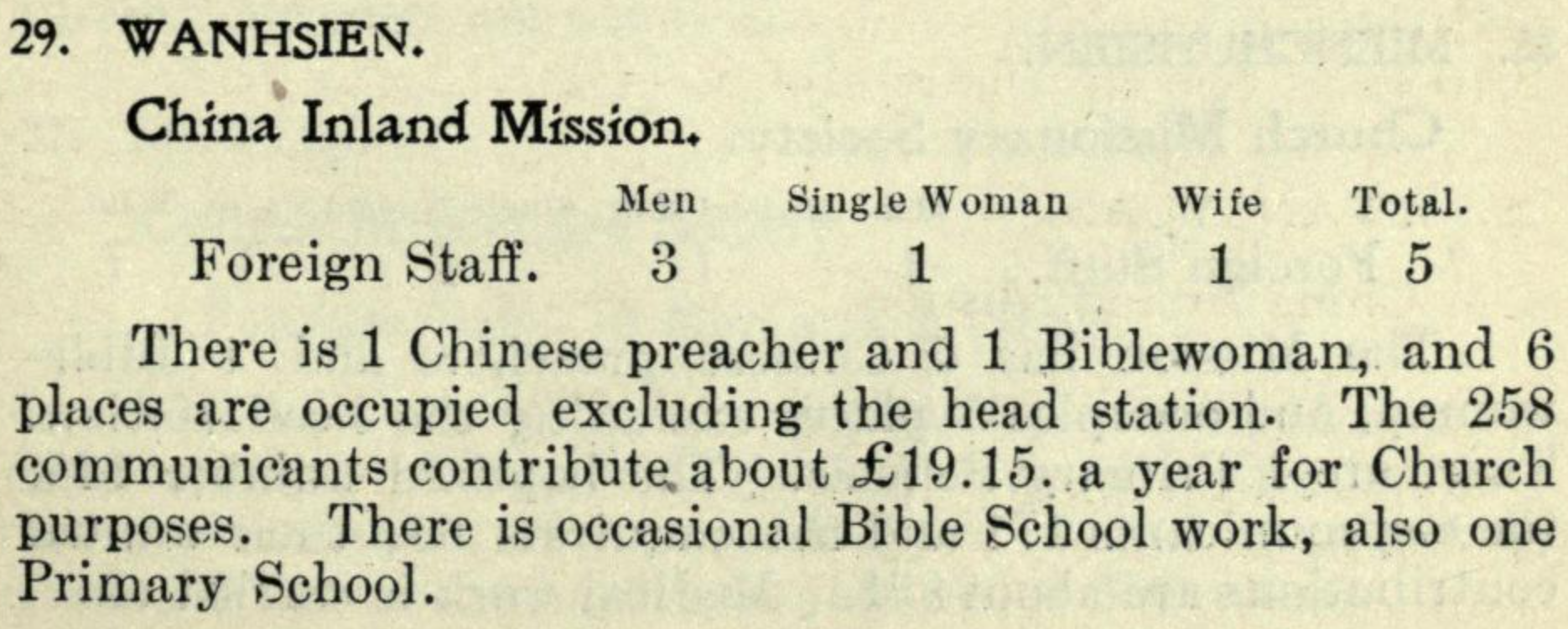
Survey of China Inland Mission's mission work in Wanhsien, published in 1913.

Protestantism was first introduced to Wanzhou (then known as Wanhsien [Wan County], was part of Sichuan Province) by a British Anglican missionary in 1882. The first baptism took place in 1896, conducted by two British missionaries, with 16 locals being baptised into Anglican Church.

In 1901, a residential property on Sanma Road was purchased for 2400 taels of sycee by the local Anglican missionary Chao Shang-lien, and was converted into a place of worship named Gospel Church. In 1919, the East Szechwan School of Theology was established by a British missionary in Wanhsien. The church became one of the county's main venues for Protestant worship along with the Lutheran Holy Cross Church.

The Wanhsien incident in 1926 forced all foreign missionaries out of Sichuan, the congregation had sunk into slumber since then. It was not until 1934, when Pastor Andrew Gih led a group of missionaries from Shanghai Bethel Mission, entered Wanhsien to set up a special sermon which lasted for a week, that revived the church.

After the communist takeover of China in 1949, Christian Churches in China were forced to sever their ties with respective overseas churches, which has thus led to the merging of Gospel Church into the communist-established Three-Self Patriotic Church.

During the 2000s, in order to support Three Gorges Project, the church was moved to its present location and rebuilt in neo-Romanesque style.

== See also ==
- Anglicanism in Sichuan
- Category:Former Anglican church buildings in Sichuan
- St John's Cathedral, Langzhong – former cathedral of East Szechwan
