= Shanxiang Mosque =

Mosque in Zhenjiang, Jiangsu, China

- 山巷清真寺
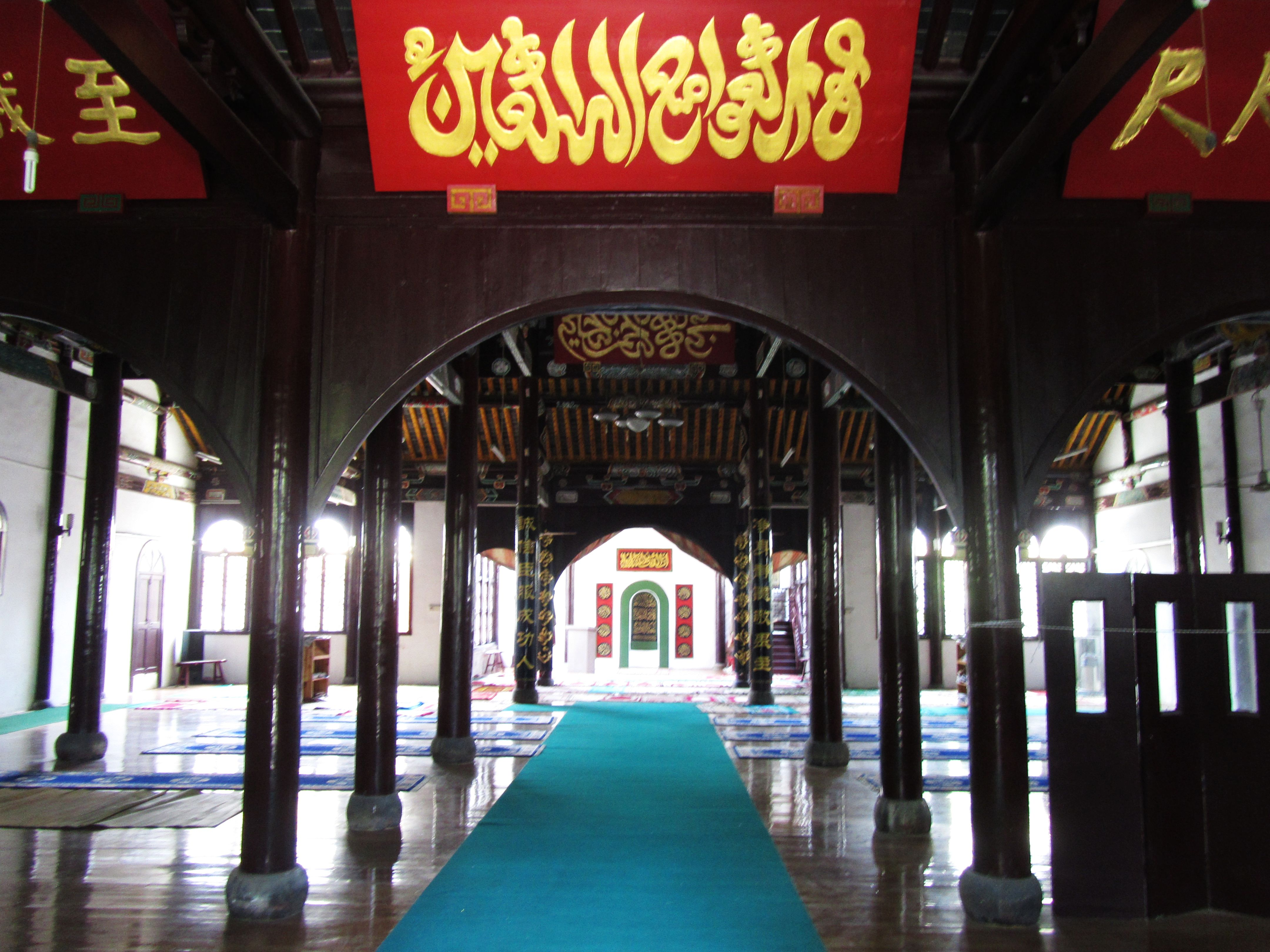

- Location of the mosque in Jiangsu

Religion
- Affiliation: Sunni Islam
- Ecclesiastical or organizational status: Mosque
- Status: Active

Location
- Location: Runzhou, Zhenjiang, Jiangsu
- Country: China
- Interactive map of Shanxiang Mosque
- Coordinates: 32°12′46″N 119°25′56″E

Architecture
- Type: Mosque
- Style: Chinese
- Completed: 1662 CE
- Site area: 2,000 m^{2} (22,000 sq ft)

The Shanxiang Mosque (Chinese: 山巷清真寺; pinyin: Shānxiàng Qīngzhēnsì) is a mosque in Runzhou District, Zhenjiang City, in the Jiangsu province of China.

== Overview ==
The mosque was constructed in 1662 CE and had undergone several reconstruction afterwards. In 1903, the mosque established an Islamic school. During the World War II, the mosque served as a refugee camp from the Japanese invasion. Currently, the mosque regularly hold several activities such as Imam training, hold forums, and guest receptions.

Located on a 2,000-square-metre (22,000 sq ft) site, the mosque was built in the traditional Chinese architectural style.

== See also ==
Shanxiang Mosque
- Chinese: 山巷清真寺
Transcriptions
Standard Mandarin
- Hanyu Pinyin: Shānxiàng Qīngzhēnsì

- Islam in China
- List of mosques in China
