= Gospel Church, Guanghan =

- Grace Church
- 福音堂
- Location: Guanghan, Deyang, Sichuan
- Country: China
- Denomination: Three-Self Church (Protestant)
- Previous denomination: Anglican
- Churchmanship: Low church evangelical

History
- Status: Church
- Founded: 1902
- Founder: Church Missionary Society

Architecture
- Functional status: Active
- Style: Local architecture (old church building); Modernist architecture (new church building)

Administration
- Province: China (formerly)
- Diocese: Szechwan (formerly); West Szechwan (formerly; since 1936)

Clergy
- Pastor: Guangyu Yu

Gospel Church (Note: Chinese: 福音堂; pinyin: Fúyīn táng; Wade–Giles: Fu^{2}-yin^{1} tʽang^{2}; Sichuanese romanization: Fu^{5} In^{1} Tʽang^{2}.) is a Protestant church situated on Dabei Upper Street, in the county-level city of Guanghan, Deyang, Sichuan Province. Founded in 1902, it was formerly an Anglican church in the West Szechwan Diocese of the Church in China. It has been subjected to the control of the state-sanctioned Three-Self Patriotic Church since 1954. In 2003, a new church was built on Shuyuan Street, and renamed Grace Church. (Note: Chinese: 天恩堂; pinyin: Tiān'ēn táng; Wade–Giles: Tʽien^{1}-ên^{1} tʽang^{2}; lit. 'Heavenly Grace Church'.)

== History ==
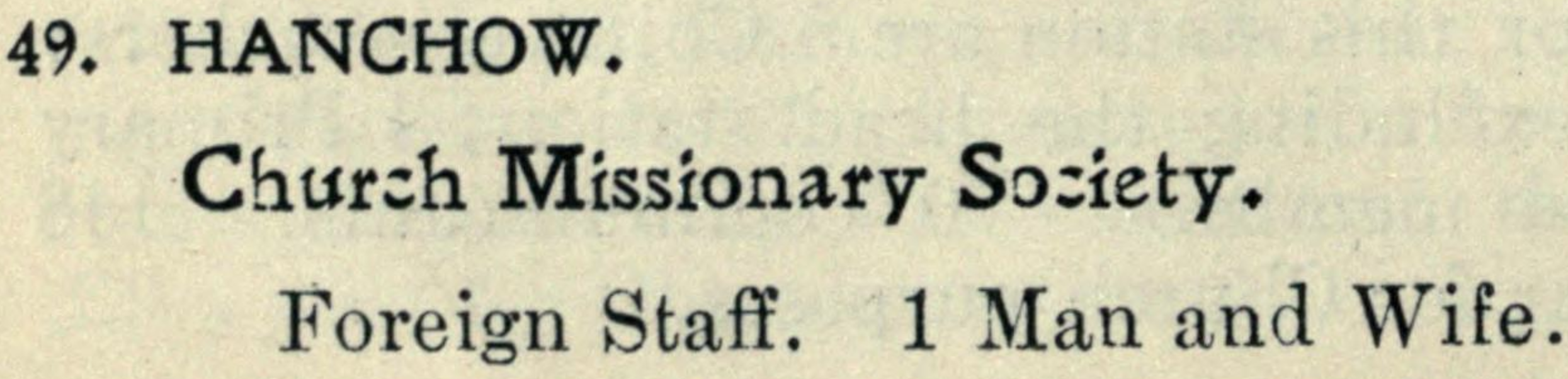
Survey of the Church Missionary Society's mission work in Hanchow, published in 1913.

Gospel Church was founded by a Church of England pastor in 1902, belonging to the Diocese of West Szechwan. It is built in local architectural style, with a pseudo-Gothic door topped by a cross.

In 1929, Vyvyan Donnithorne, a member of the Church Missionary Society, together with his wife, arrived in Guanghan (then known as Hanchow). He served as pastor of the Gospel Church until 1949, before being transferred to the Canary Islands, Spain. During his stay in Hanchow, he became a member of the West China Border Research Society, and one of the key figures in the discovery of the archaeological site now known as Sanxingdui.

After the communist takeover of China in 1949, Christian Churches in China were forced to sever their ties with respective overseas Churches, which has thus led to the merging of Gospel Church into the communist-established Three-Self Patriotic Church.

Consecration of a new church took place in 2003. Unlike the original church, the new building was designed in an entirely Modernist style.

== See also ==
- Anglicanism in Sichuan
- Category:Former Anglican church buildings in Sichuan
- St John's Church, Chengdu – former cathedral of West Szechwan
