= Frank Houghton =

Anglican missionary

- Bishop of East Szechwan
- Frank Houghton, c. 1930s
- Church: Church in China
- Diocese: East Szechwan
- Installed: 1936
- Term ended: 1940
- Predecessor: John Holden (as Bishop of Western China)
- Successor: Kenneth Bevan

Orders
- Ordination: 1917

Personal details
- Born: 1894 Stafford, Staffordshire, England
- Died: 1972 (aged 77–78)
- Denomination: Anglican
- Spouse: Dorothy Cassels
- Education: University of London

Frank Houghton (1894–1972) was an Anglican missionary bishop and author.

== Biography ==
Houghton was born in Stafford and educated at the University of London and ordained in 1917. He held curacies at St Benedict, Everton and All Saints, Preston before heading to Republican China as a missionary with the China Inland Mission in 1920. In 1923 he married Dorothy Cassels, the daughter of William Cassels, who had been a member of the Cambridge Seven and became a bishop in China. Houghton was general director of the China Inland Mission at the time when the Mission had to leave China in 1951. He was Bishop of East Szechwan from 1937 to 1940. Returning to England he held incumbencies at St Marks, New Milverton, Leamington and St Peter's, Drayton, Banbury. He retired in 1963 and died on 25 January 1972.

== Works ==
Houghton's books include The Two Hundred (1932); China Calling (1936); If We Believe (1952); Amy Carmichael of Dohnavur (1953); The Fire Burns On (1964); and Living Your Life (1966).

He also wrote the hymns "Facing a Task Unfinished", "My Lord, Who in the Desert Fed", "O Thou Who Dost Direct My Feet" and "Thou Who Wast Rich Beyond All Splendour".

== See also ==
- Anglicanism in Sichuan
