= Kenneth Bevan =

Kenneth Graham Bevan
- Bishop of East Szechwan
- Church: Church in China
- Diocese: East Szechwan
- Installed: 1940
- Term ended: 1950
- Predecessor: Frank Houghton
- Successor: Tsai Fuh-tsu
- Other post: Assistant Bishop of Wakefield

Orders
- Consecration: 1940

Personal details
- Born: 27 September 1898 Hampstead, London, England
- Died: 3 December 1993 (aged 95)
- Denomination: Anglican
- Parents: James Alfred Bevan; Annie Susan Woodall
- Spouse: Jocelyn Duncan
- Education: Great Yarmouth Grammar School; London College of Divinity

Kenneth Graham Bevan (27 September 1898 – 3 December 1993) was an Anglican missionary bishop in China.

== Early life ==
Bevan was born in 1898, in Hampstead, where his father was a curate. He was the son of the Rev. James Alfred Bevan, who had captained Wales in their first international rugby union match, and his wife Annie. He was educated at Great Yarmouth Grammar School and the London College of Divinity.

== Career ==
He was ordained deacon in 1923, and priest in 1924, and was then a curate at Holy Trinity, Tunbridge Wells (now Trinity Theatre) before missionary service with the Anglican-Episcopal Province of China from 1925. Consecrated a bishop in 1940 in Holy Trinity Cathedral, Shanghai, for 10 years he was Bishop of East Szechwan. The obituary in the Church Times stated that: "His diocese was wild and mountainous, and in travelling round it he was reduced, he said, to carrying only a Bible and a toothbrush."

Following the end of the Chinese Civil War and the Communist takeover of China, Bevan returned to England and became the vicar of Woolhope (1951–1966), during which time he was also rural dean of Hereford (1955–1966) and Prebendary de Moreton et Whaddon at Hereford Cathedral (1956–1966). On retirement in 1966 he became Master of Archbishop Holgate's Hospital in Hemsworth and then an assistant bishop in the Diocese of Wakefield for a further 11 years. During that time, he founded the Retired Clergy Association.

== Personal life ==
Bevan married Jocelyn Duncan (known as Joyce) Barber in 1927 in Holy Trinity Cathedral, Shanghai. They had three daughters.

He died in 1993, aged 95.

== See also ==
- Anglicanism in Sichuan
