= Gospel Church, Mianzhu =

- 福音堂
- Location: 26 Minzhu Alley, Mianzhu, Deyang, Sichuan
- Country: China
- Denomination: Three-Self Church (Protestant)
- Previous denomination: Anglican
- Churchmanship: Low church evangelical

History
- Status: Church
- Founded: 1923
- Founder(s): John Howard Lechler, et al.

Architecture
- Functional status: Active
- Style: Sichuanese architecture (old church building); Gothic Revival (new church building)
- Groundbreaking: 1923 (old church building); 2010 (new church building)

Administration
- Province: China (formerly)
- Diocese: Szechwan (formerly); West Szechwan (formerly; since 1936)

Gospel Church (Note: Chinese: 福音堂; pinyin: Fúyīn táng; Wade–Giles: Fu^{2}-yin^{1} tʽang^{2}; Sichuanese romanization: Fu^{5} In^{1} Tʽang^{2}.) is a Protestant church situated in Minzhu Alley, in the county-level city of Mianzhu, Sichuan Province. First built in 1923, it was formerly an Anglican church in the West Szechwan Diocese of the Church in China. It has been subjected to the control of the state-sanctioned Three-Self Patriotic Church since 1954.

After the 2008 Sichuan earthquake, a new Gospel Church was built on Yuxian Road. The original church is also known simply as the Chapel. (Note: Chinese: 禮拜堂; pinyin: Lǐbài táng; Wade–Giles: Li^{3}-pai^{4} tʽang^{2}; lit. 'place [chapel] of worship'.)

== History ==
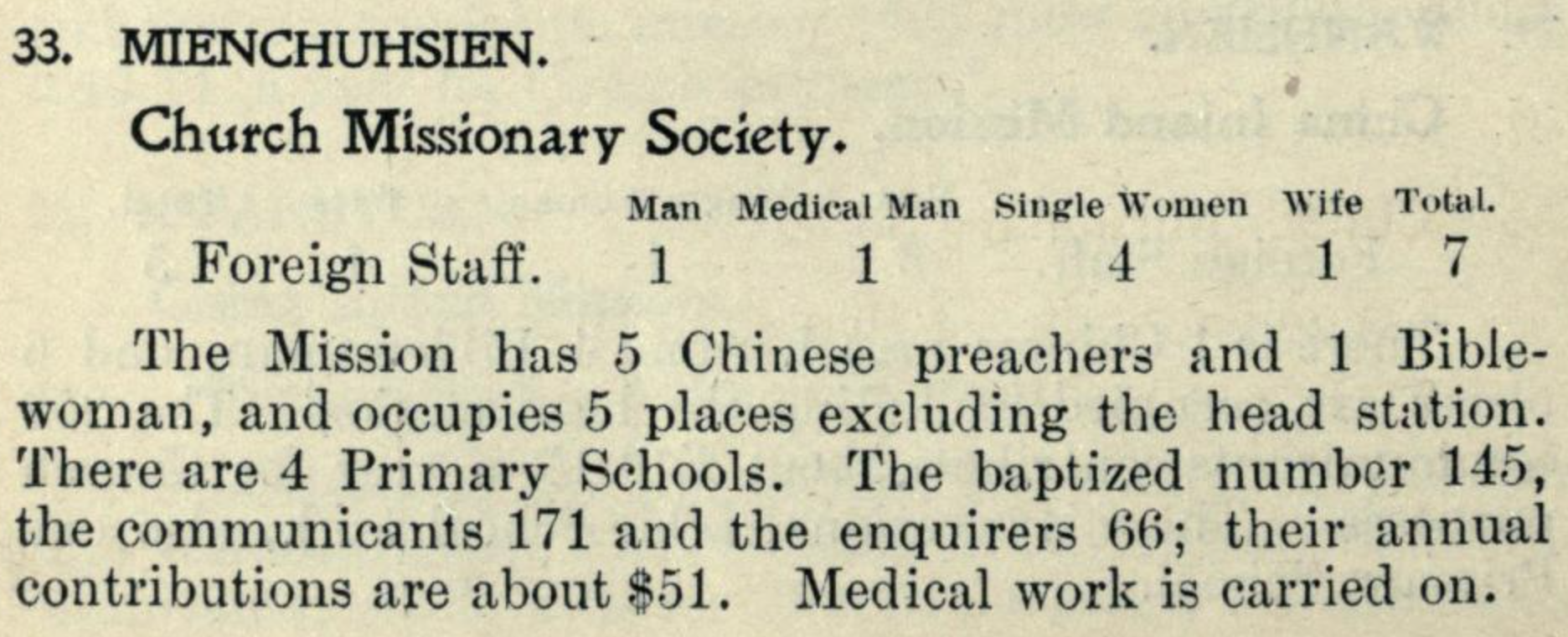
Survey of the Church Missionary Society's mission work in Mienchu, published in 1913.

Protestantism was first brought to Mianzhu (formerly romanised as Mienchu) around 1894. In 1923, the medical missionary, John Howard Lechler (1883–1977), of the Church of England Church Missionary Society, together with other three missionaries, established the small chapel denominated Gospel Church. It is built in traditional Sichuanese architectural style with neo-Gothic elements, covering an area of 300 square metres. A two-storey wooden house providing accommodation for pastors and preachers was built in the courtyard.

The missionaries also established a church school and the Jen Tse Hospital. Lechler returned to England in 1932, for reporting his work to the Church. Before his departure, he invited Dr Montagu Robert Lawrence, the elder brother of T. E. Lawrence, to working as a locum in the hospital during his absence.

After the communist takeover of China in 1949, Christian Churches in China were forced to sever their ties with respective overseas Churches, which has thus led to the merging of Gospel Church into the communist-established Three-Self Patriotic Church. During the 2008 Sichuan earthquake, the church was damaged beyond repair. A new Gospel Church was built on Yuxian Road, completed in an entirely neo-Gothic style.

== See also ==
- Anglicanism in Sichuan
- Category:Former Anglican church buildings in Sichuan
- St John's Church, Chengdu – former cathedral of West Szechwan
