= Chung Hua Sheng Kung Hui =

Anglican church in China (1912-1958)

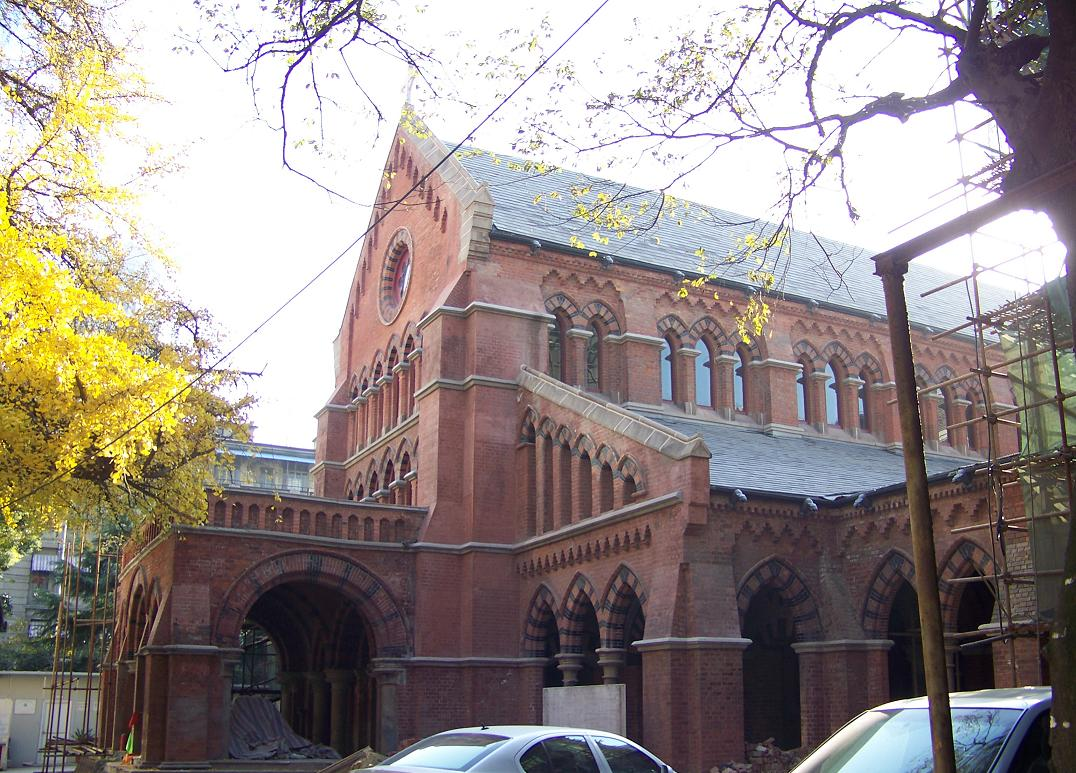
Holy Trinity Cathedral, Shanghai

Chung Hua Sheng Kung Hui (CHSKH, Chinese: 中華聖公會), known in English as the Holy Catholic Church in China or Anglican-Episcopal Province of China, was the Anglican Church in China from 1912 until about 1958, when it ceased operations.

== History ==
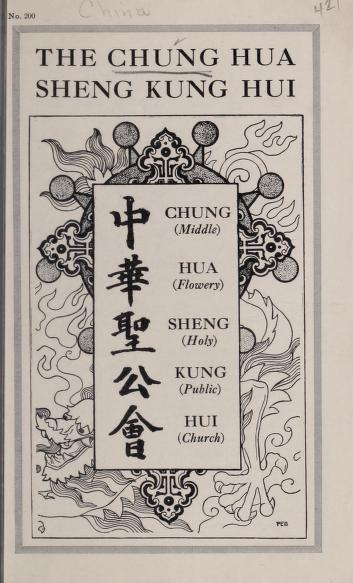
Cover of the booklet The Chung Hua Sheng Kung Hui, published by the Episcopal Church of the United States, New York City, 1913.

The Chung Hua Sheng Kung Hui was established on 26 April 1912 by the merger of the various mission activities of the Church of England, the Episcopal Church of the United States, Anglican Church of Canada and other Anglican provinces into one autonomous jurisdiction. The merger of the respective Anglican missionary initiatives in China into one national church echoed similar steps that were taken in 1887 to establish the Nippon Sei Ko Kai or Anglican Church in Japan.

After 1949, its dioceses in Hong Kong and Macao became the Anglican Diocese of Hong Kong and Macao, later reorganized as an independent Anglican province, the Hong Kong Sheng Kung Hui. Those who fled to Taiwan with the Chinese Nationalists established the Episcopal Diocese of Taiwan, a diocese of the Episcopal Church of the United States. The CHSKH was never formally dissolved, but all activities had ended by 1958.

== Anglican mission initiatives in China prior to 1912 ==
- Church of England missionary initiatives referred to as The Church in China (1849–1912)
- Episcopal Church missionary initiatives referred to as the Protestant Episcopal Church Mission (1835–1912)

== Education ==
- Two major universities – Boone University (later called Central China Normal University in 1924) and St. John's University were established for higher education

== Dioceses ==
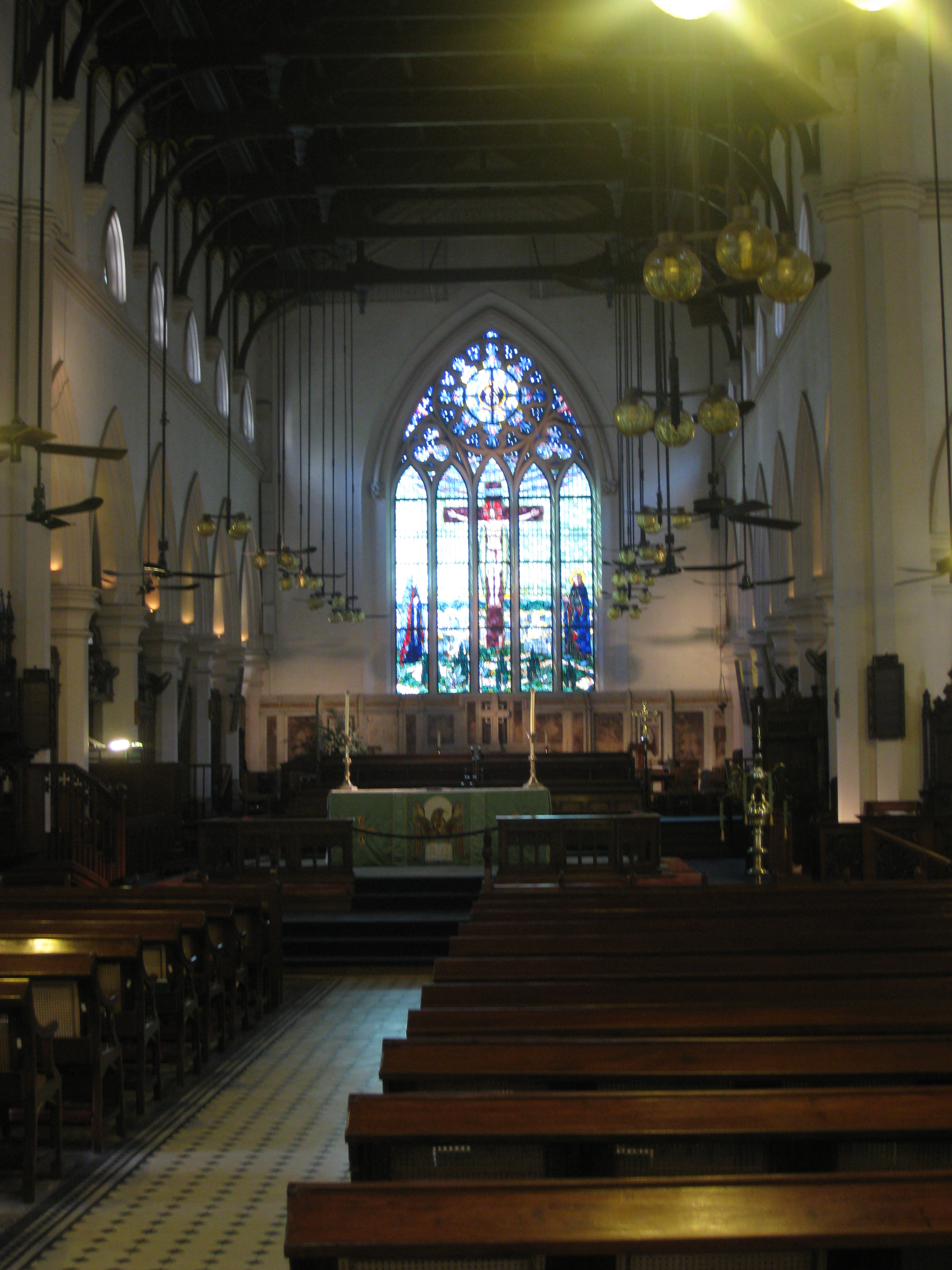
St John's Cathedral, Hong Kong

- Victoria Diocese (1842) had the church of St. John's Cathedral, Hong Kong
- Hong Kong-Macao Diocese (South China Mission, 1849)
- Che Kiang Diocese (Chekiang Mission, 1872) had the church of Holy Trinity Cathedral, Shanghai under the Bishop of Chekiang.
- Hua Pei Diocese (1880) had the churches of Holy Saviour's Cathedral – the Diocesan Cathedral) in Beijing, All Saints' Church in Tianjin, and Dalian Anglican Church in Dalian.
- Hua Hsi Diocese (West China Mission, 1895) had the Gospel Church in Guanghan, Gospel Church in Jiangyou, Gospel Church in Mianyang, Gospel Church and St Thomas' Church in Mianzhu, Gospel Church in Wanzhou (Chongqing), St John's Church in Chengdu, St John's Cathedral and Trinity Church in Langzhong
- Shantung or Shan Tung Diocese was a missionary diocese of the Church of England in China. Formerly part of the Church of England North China Mission, it was erected into a diocesan see in 1901 when it was separated from the missionary diocese of North China which traced its origins to the mission established in 1872. By 1903, the new diocese was centred on the Church of England mission known as T'aian-Fu, Shantung Mission, 1903. The first bishop of the diocese Geoffrey Durnford Iliff, consecrated in 1903) had a cathedral church at Tai-an-Fu built of local granite in 1913, and consecrated in 1915. He was succeeded by Thomas Arnold Scott in 1921. Scott served the diocese until 1940, when he was translated to the diocese of North China. The third and last bishop before nationalisation took place after the victory of the Chinese Communists was John Wellington. His bishopric lasted 1940 to 1950, but he was interned by the Japanese during much of that time only being released at the conclusion of World War II. In addition to the cathedral, the earlier mission church and school was built at Tai-an in 1886 with funds from the Society for the Propagation of the Gospel in Foreign Parts. The church's property was handed to the Three-Self Patriotic Movement, Communist China's official Protestant church, in the 1950s, and designated a National Historic Landmark in 1994. In 2010, the church's fate became a matter of bitter controversy when local government officials and developers attempted to demolish the church in the face of the active opposition of the local congregation.
- Fu Kien Diocese (Fukien Mission, 1906)
- Kui Hsiang Diocese (Kwangsi-Hunan Mission, 1909)
- Yun Kui Diocese (Yunnan-Kuichou Mission, 1947) — the first bishop, Quentin Huang, was consecrated on 3 August 1947 at St. John's Cathedral, Hong Kong by Ronald Hall

Mo-Yung In was consecrated a bishop on 25 March 1950, to serve as Bishop of Guangzhou/Guangdong, in preparation for the severing of the Hong Kong diocese from the Chinese church.

== Church in China ==
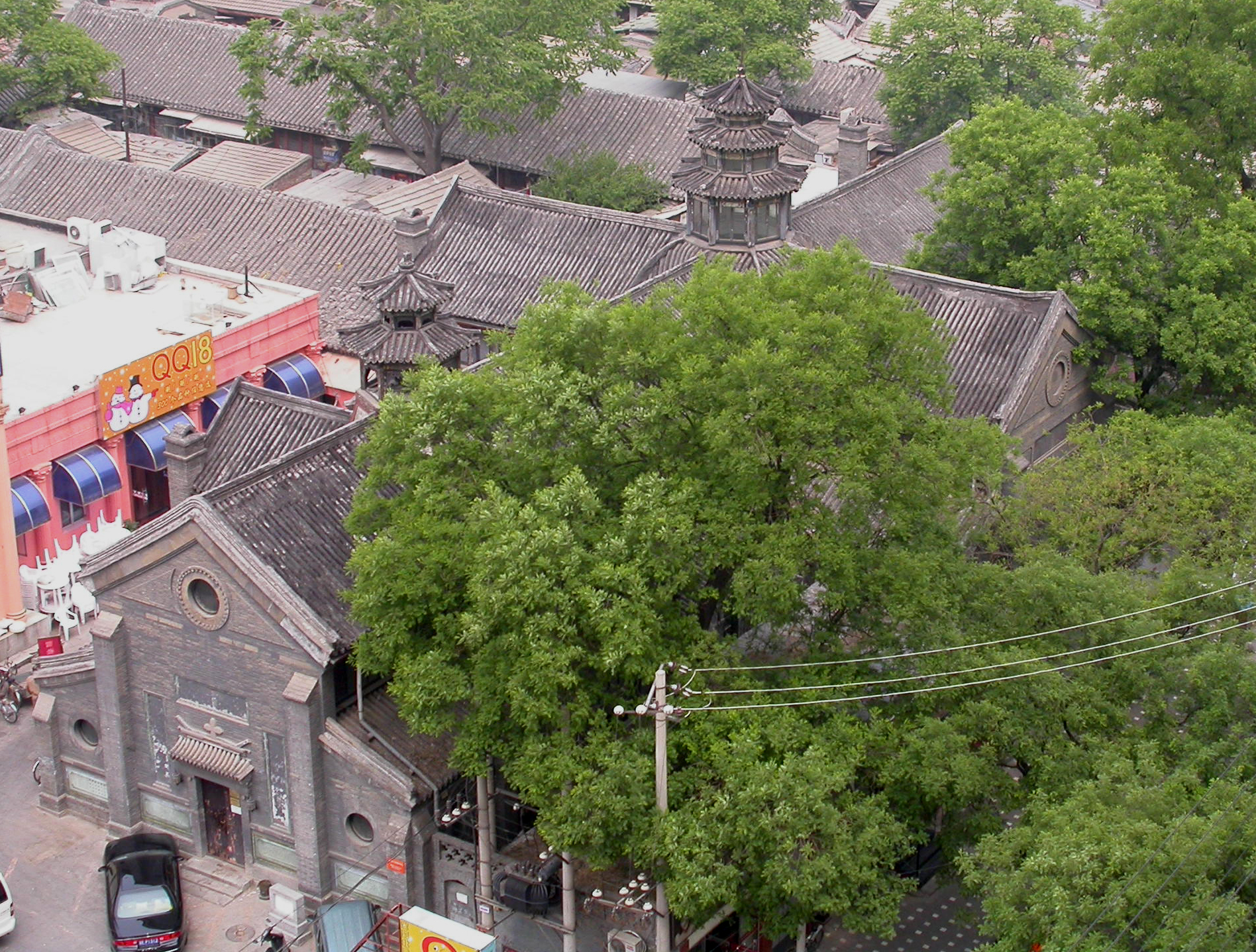
Holy Saviour's Cathedral in Beijing was the cathedral of North China.

The Church in China is the name by which Anglican missions under the jurisdiction of the Church of England were called between 1849 and 1949. Bishops' jurisdictions included

- Shensi
- Chekiang
- Diocese of North China
- Szechwan
- Shantung
- Fukien
- Honan (Henan)
- Kwangsi and Hunan
- Mid-China
- Diocese of Western China

== Jurisdictions ==
The Anglican Church in China was divided into eleven jurisdictions as of 1913.

Jurisdiction	Bishop	Maintained by
North China	C. P. Scott (1880)	Society for the Propagation of the Gospel
Shantung	G. D. Iliff (1903)	Society for the Propagation of the Gospel
Western China	W. W. Cassels (1895)	Church of England Missionary Society
Shanghai	F. R. Graves (1893)	American Episcopal Church
Hankow	L. H. Roots (1904)	American Episcopal Church
Wuhu	D. T. Huntington (1912)	American Episcopal Church
Honan	W. C. White (1909)	Church of England in Canada
Cheh-Kiang	H. J. Molony (1908)	Church of England Missionary Society
Kiangsi and Hunan	W. Banister (1909)	Church of England Missionary Society
Fuh-Kien	H. McC E. Price (1906)	Church of England Missionary Society
Victoria (Hong Kong)	G. H. Lander (1907)	Church of England Missionary Society

== See also ==
- Christianity in China
- Protestantism in China
- Anglicanism in Sichuan
- Anglican diocese of Shanghai
- Anglican Diocese of Hong Kong and Macao
- Bishop of Victoria, Hong Kong
- Anglican Communion
- Hong Kong Sheng Kung Hui
- Taiwan Episcopal Church
- Church of England Zenana Missionary Society
