= David Curtis (rugby union) =

Irish rugby union player and cricketer

- Born: David Michael Curtis; 10 April 1965 (age 61) Salisbury, Southern Rhodesia

Rugby union career
- Position: Centre
International career
Years	Team	Apps	(Points)
1991-1992	Ireland	13	(7)
- Cricket career

Cricket information
- Batting: Right-handed
- Bowling: Leg break

Domestic team information
- Years: Team
- 1990: Oxford University

Career statistics
Competition	First-class
Matches	4
Runs scored	89
Batting average	22.25
100s/50s	–/–
Top score	43
Balls bowled	6
Wickets	0
Bowling average	–
5 wickets in innings	–
10 wickets in match	–
Best bowling	–
Catches/stumpings	–/–
- Source: David Curtis at Cricinfo

David Michael Curtis (born 10 April 1965) is a former Zimbabwean-born Irish rugby union international. He also played some first-class cricket while at Oxford University.

== Career ==
Curtis was born in Salisbury, the capital city of Rhodesia, now known as Zimbabwe. He made his debut for Ireland against Wales in the 1991 Five Nations. He represented Ireland at the World Cup later that year, scoring a try in the pool stage against his country of birth and participating in their losing quarter-final team. In all he was capped for Ireland on 13 occasions and scored his only other points courtesy of a drop goal in an international friendly against Namibia.

He qualified for Ireland through his father Arthur who had also represented his country as a wing forward in 1950.

His four first-class cricket matches were for Oxford University in 1990, playing against Leicestershire, Glamorgan, Nottinghamshire and Cambridge. A right-handed batsman, he made 89 runs at 22.25.

== Personal life ==
He now lives in Zimbabwe, making a living through selling wine and craft beer. He has three sons, Angus who formerly played for Ulster, Graham and Simon, and a daughter Annabel.

== See also ==
- List of Irish cricket and rugby union players
