= Vyvyan Donnithorne =

Anglican missionary (1886–1968)

The Venerable Vyvyan Henry Donnithorne MC MA
- Archdeacon of Western Szechwan
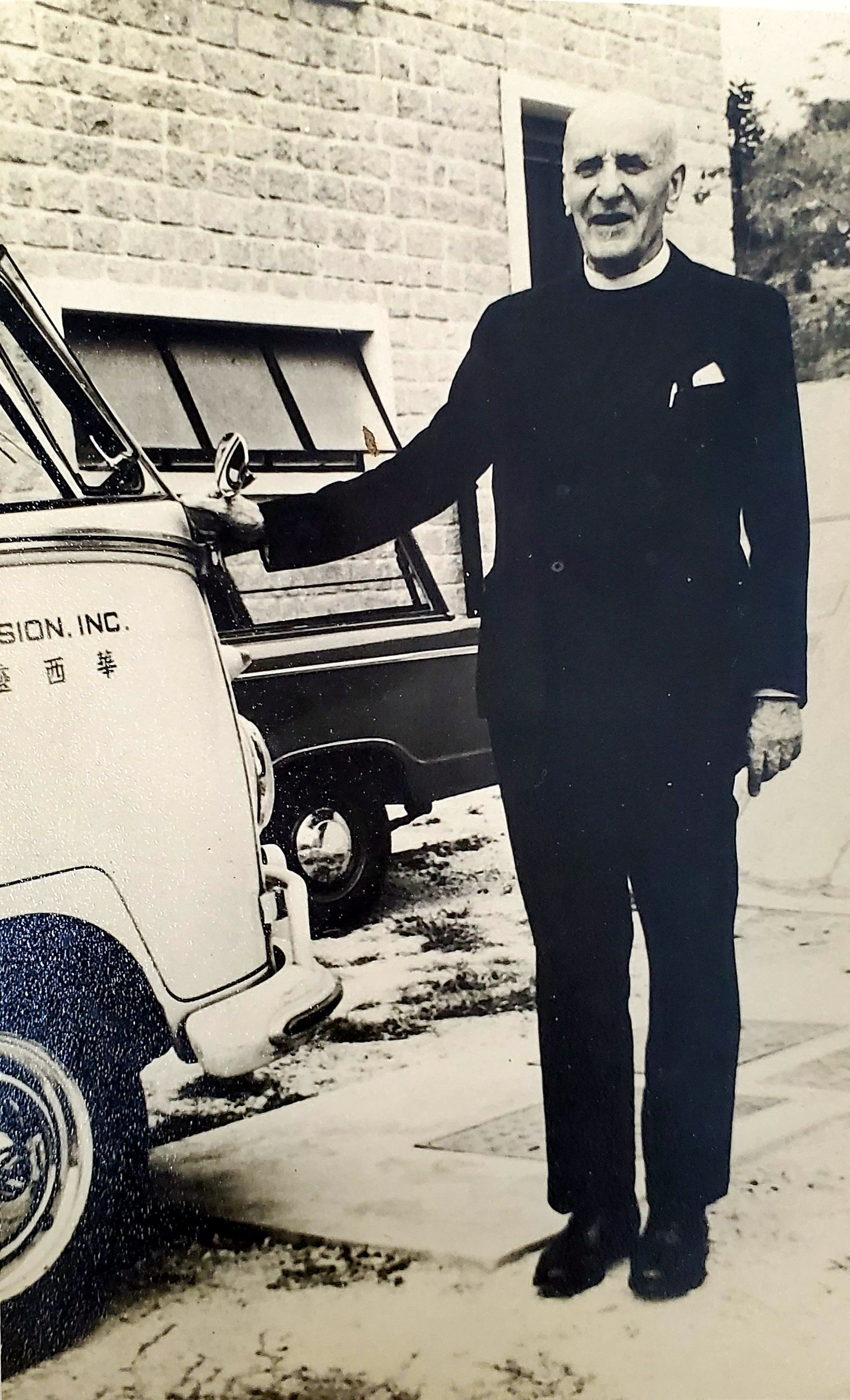
- V. H. Donnithorne at his house in Sha Tin, 1960s
- Church: Church in China
- Diocese: Western Szechwan
- Installed: 1935
- Term ended: 1949
- Predecessor: Frederick Boreham

Personal details
- Born: 8 January 1886 Twickenham, England
- Died: 12 December 1968 (aged 82) British Hong Kong
- Buried: Hong Kong Cemetery
- Denomination: Anglican
- Spouse: Gladys Emma Ingram
- Children: Audrey Donnithorne
- Education: Christ's Hospital; Clare College, Cambridge; Ridley Hall, Cambridge

The Venerable Vyvyan Henry Donnithorne, MC, MA (8 January 1886 – 12 December 1968) was Archdeacon of Western Szechwan from 1935 to 1949.

== Biography ==
Vyvyan Donnithorne was of Cornish descent. He was educated at Christ's Hospital, Clare College, Cambridge and Ridley Hall, Cambridge. After wartime service in the Royal Hampshire Regiment he was ordained in 1919. He was a member of the Church Missionary Society in Szechwan (now romanized as Sichuan), West China from 1920 to 1949. He served as pastor in the Gospel Church of Hanchow, since 1929. He was a chaplain in the Canary Islands, Spain from 1949 to 1953. In retirement, he lived in Hong Kong. He died in 1968 and was buried in Hong Kong Cemetery.

He was the father of Audrey Donnithorne; and was one of the key figures in the discovery of the archaeological site now known as Sanxingdui. A well to do farmer had discovered jade implements while dredging an irrigation ditch in 1927. This was near Hanchow, where Donnithorne was stationed, and the discovery was brought to his attention in 1931. He recognized the importance of the discovery and contacted a local magistrate as well as Daniel S. Dye, a professor of geology at West China Union University. The three of them then visited the site and photographed and measured it. Through the magistrate, a few items were acquired and sent to the museum at WCUU. Then, in 1934, David Crockett Graham, the new director of the museum at WCUU, organized the first archaeological excavation of the site.

== See also ==
- Anglicanism in Sichuan
- Anglicanism in Spain
- The West China Missionary News
- Journal of the West China Border Research Society
