= Beijing Street Church =

Church building in Dalian, China

Coordinates: 38.92°N 121.61°E

Beijing Street Church (simplified Chinese: 北京街礼拜堂; traditional Chinese: 北京街禮拜堂) is a Protestant church located in Dalian, Liaoning, China. It is the former Dalian Lutheran Church (traditional Chinese: 大連路德教堂; simplified Chinese: 大连路德教堂) and its church building is now a Historical Building Protected by Dalian City. It was recently renamed as Dalian City Cheng-en Church (大连市承恩堂, literally "Dalian City Receiving Grace Church"), but the local people still call it "Beijing Street Church." The building is just over two miles away from Xinghai Square.

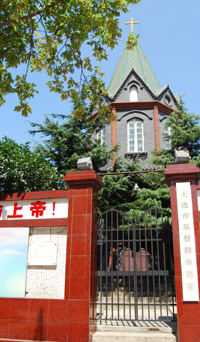
Beijing Street Church in Dalian, China

== Brief history ==
- From 1895, the Danish National Church (Evangelical Lutheran Church of Denmark) sent missions to Beijing and northern China, and in 1914, built the Dalian Lutheran Church. Dalian was Japan's leased territory at that time.
- It officially belonged to the Lutheran Church of Northern China, of Lutheran Church of China. In the nearby naval port of Lüshun, another Lutheran church was built, which also still exists.
- At the end of the Second World War and the establishment of the People's Republic of China. it came to be known as Beijing Street Church.
- During the Cultural Revolution of 1966-1977, all religious activities were suppressed, and the church was closed.
- When the Cultural Revolution ended, Christian worship restarted, and the building came to belong to the post-denominational China Christian Council.
- The offices of the China Christian Council and Three-Self Patriotic Movement Committee of Dalian City, which used to be housed in the former rectory of this church, had recently moved to May 1 Square.
- In 2002, it was listed as a Historic Building Under Protection of the City of Dalian.
- In 2006, it was renamed as Dalian City Cheng-en Church (Chinese: 大连市承恩堂, literally "Dalian City Receiving Grace Church), but the local people still call it "Beijing Street Church."

== See also ==
- Christianity and Protestantism
- Christianity in China, Protestantism in China and Three-Self Patriotic Movement
- Danish National Church (Evangelical Lutheran Church of Denmark)
- Holy Cross Church, Wanzhou (Former Lutheran church in Chongqing)
- Yuguang Street Church and Dalian Catholic Church in Dalian, China
