= James Bevan (rugby union) =

Wales international rugby union player

- Born: James Alfred Bevan; 15 April 1858 St Kilda, Victoria, Australia
- Died: 3 February 1938 (aged 79) Leytonstone, London
- School: Hereford Cathedral School
- University: St John's College, Cambridge

Rugby union career
- Position: Three-quarters
Amateur team(s)
Years	Team	Apps	(Points)
- Abergavenny RFC
1877–1880	Cambridge University R.U.F.C.		
1882	Clifton RFC		
1880–1881	Newport RFC		
International career
Years	Team	Apps	(Points)
1881	Wales	1	(0)

James Alfred Bevan (15 April 1858 – 3 February 1938) was a Wales international rugby union three-quarter who played club rugby for Clifton RFC and Newport. He is best known for being the first Welsh international captain, whilst at Cambridge University.

== Early life ==
Bevan was born in St Kilda, Victoria, Australia, the son of Elizabeth (née Fly) and James Bevan. James was from Grosmont, Monmouthshire, Wales, and came to Melbourne, Victoria in 1848. Elizabeth Fly arrived with her parents and 3 brothers John, William and Charles in 1853 on board the Recruit. James Snr met 17 year old Elizabeth in Bendigo, Victoria and married soon after. He was a childhood friend of Alfred Deakin, the second Prime Minister of Australia; their fathers were partners in a coaching business. On 11 January 1866, Bevan's parents died when the SS London sank in a gale in the Bay of Biscay.

He was sent back to Wales after being orphaned to live with paternal relatives. He attended Hereford Cathedral School.

== Rugby career ==
Bevan played for Abergavenny before attending university at St John's College, Cambridge, graduating in 1881. Bevan played for Cambridge University R.U.F.C., was awarded two Blues for rugby (in 1877 and 1880) and while with Cambridge was selected to captain the first Welsh international, against England.

The Rugby Football Union insisted that the England vs Wales match be played on 19 February 1881. This was the same day that Swansea were playing Llanelli at Neath in a semi-final cup-tie thus depriving Wales of several players. This was Wales's first international, organised before the Welsh Rugby Union was set up. The players had never played together before, though one player, Major Richard Summers, was selected for Wales on his performances a couple of years earlier for his school, Cheltenham College, in matches against Cardiff and Newport. No formal invitations to play were sent out to the Welsh XV. Two of those expected to appear did not turn up, so bystanders, university undergraduates with tenuous Welsh links who had travelled to London to see the match, were called in to play for Wales.

It was a humiliating defeat for the Welsh team and Bevan never played for Wales again (under modern scoring values Wales lost 82–0). A month after the match the WRFU was founded at the Castle Hotel, Neath on 12 March 1881.

The James Bevan Trophy was named in his honour to celebrate 100 years of Test Rugby.

=== International matches played ===
Wales

- England 1881

== Clergy career ==
Bevan later became an Anglican clergyman. He was ordained deacon in 1888 and priest in 1889. He served his title first at Christ Church, Hampstead (1888-1892) and secondly at Trinity Church, Hampstead (1892-1899). From 1899 to 1936 he was vicar at St George's Church in Great Yarmouth (now St George's Theatre). In addition, he was Vicar of St Margaret's, Herringfleet from 1906 to 1908.

== Personal life ==
He married Annie Susan Woodall in 1882. One of their sons was Kenneth Bevan, who also became a clergyman, and went on to become a missionary bishop in China. Bevan died in 1938, aged 79, at the vicarage of St Paul's, Leytonstone, where another son, Ernest, was the incumbent. He is buried in Hampstead Cemetery.

== Bibliography ==
- Smith, David; Williams, Gareth (1980). Fields of Praise: The Official History of The Welsh Rugby Union. Cardiff: University of Wales Press. ISBN 0-7083-0766-3.
