= Baotalu =

Subdistrict in Zhenjiang, Jiangsu, China

Baotalu Subdistrict 宝塔路街道
- Subdistrict
- Location in Jiangsu
- Coordinates: 32°12′41″N 119°26′17″E
- Country: People's Republic of China
- Province: Jiangsu
- Prefecture-level city: Zhenjiang
- District: Runzhou District
- Time zone: UTC+8 (China Standard)

Baotalu is a subdistrict of Runzhou District, Zhenjiang, Jiangsu, China. It has an area of 7.63 square kilometers and a population of 75,004. The total number of households is 28,693. There are eleven communities in Baotalu: Dianlilu Community, Guangdongshanzhuang Community, Lijiashanxincun No. 1 Community, Lijiashanxincun No. 2 Community, Yunhe Community, Fengminxincun Community, Huangshan Community, Chezhan Community, Tongdeli Community, Liming Community, Runzhouhuayuan Community.
