= Kimber Den =

Kimber Den or Teng Hsuk'un (邓述堃, 1895–1977) was an Anglican bishop in China in the second half of the 20th century.

Den was educated at St. John's University, Shanghai and ordained in 1920. He served at Anqing and Nanchang before his consecration as Bishop of Chekiang in 1949. He was imprisoned in 1952, although from the point of view of his family and his Church he simply disappeared. He continued in office as Bishop of Chekiang until 1955 and was released from prison in 1957.

Church of England titles
Preceded by John Curtis	Bishop of Chekiang; 1950–1955	Succeeded by Ting Kuang-hsun
