= Brook Hannah =

Australian rules footballer and missionary

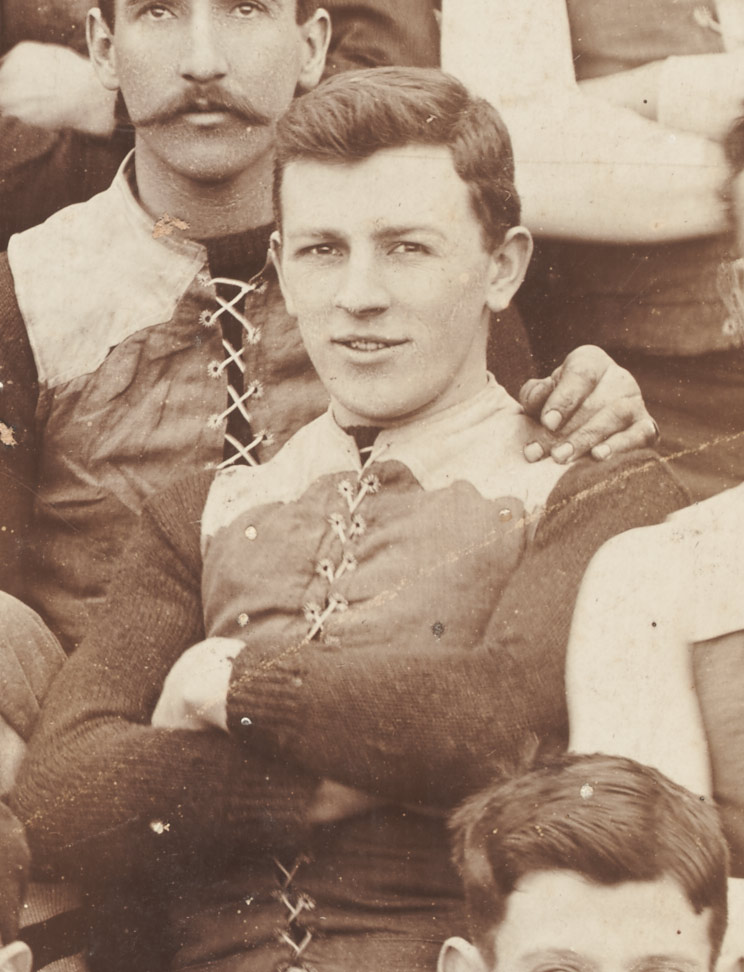
- Brook Hannah when playing for Carlton Football Club

Personal information
- Full name: Charles Brooking Hannah
- Born: 28 September 1874; Heidelberg, Victoria, Australia
- Died: 14 January 1961 (aged 86); Tunbridge Wells, England
- Position: Rover / Forward
- Other occupation: Missionary

Playing career^{1}
| Years | Club | Games (Goals) |
| 1897 | Carlton | 14 (0) |
- ^{1} Playing statistics correct to the end of 1897.

Charles Brooking 'Brook' Hannah (28 September 1874 – 14 January 1961) was an Australian rules footballer turned missionary who played with Carlton in the Victorian Football League (VFL; formerly Victorian Football Association [VFA]).

== Life and career ==
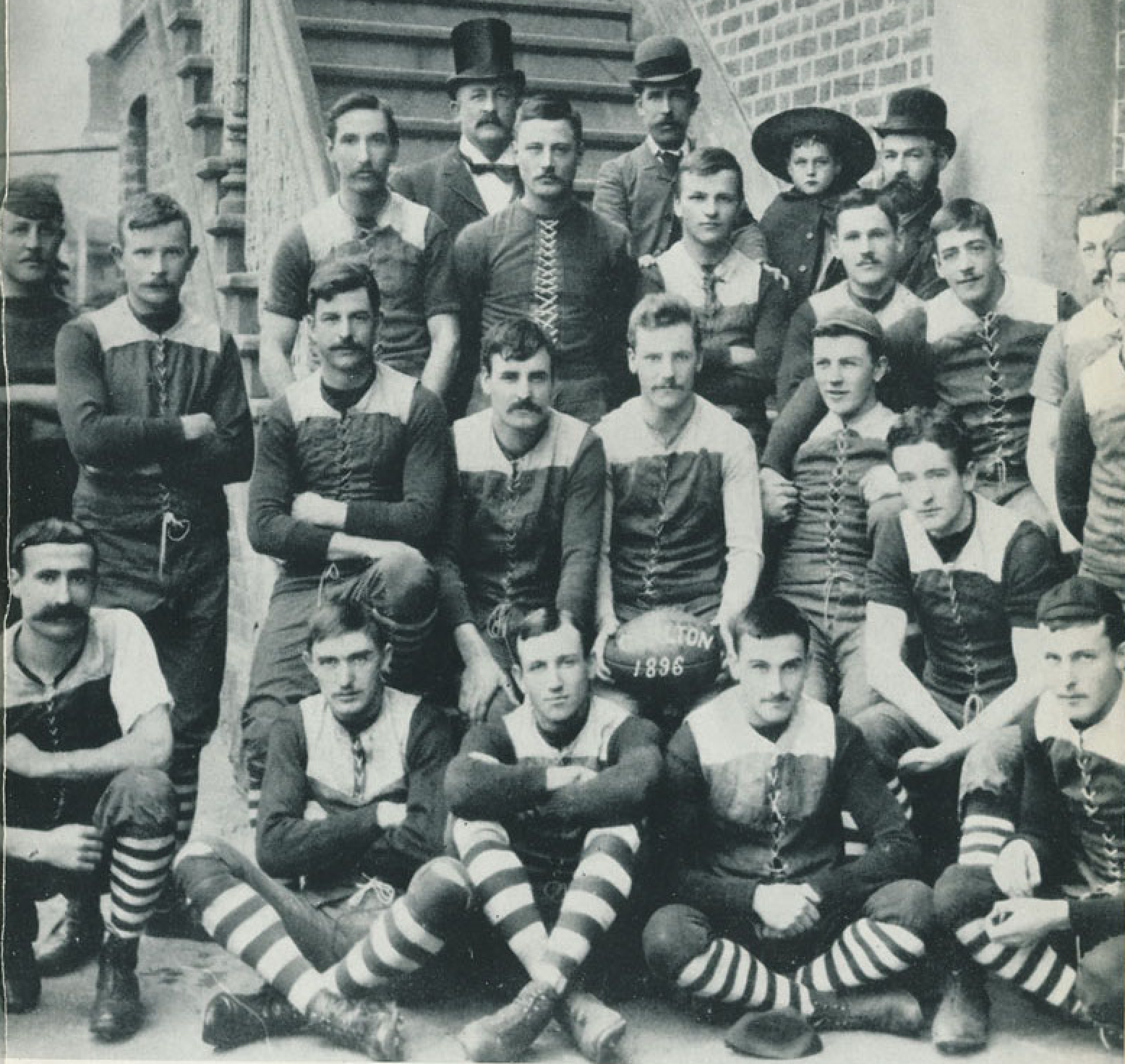
Carlton team, 1896. According to his surviving niece, Brook Hannah is believed to be the player seated in the middle row with the cap who is turning slightly away from the camera.

Brook Hannah was born on 28 September 1874 to William Hannah and Polly Lewis. His family home "Llanellan", was named after a township in Wales. It was said that his father became estranged from the family and supposedly sailed to New Zealand.

He studied law at the University of Melbourne before his debut for the "Maroons" against Carlton on 15 July 1893. He is accredited with at least 37 VFA games and a further 14 for Carlton in the VFL, and was considered one of the best players afield. Carlton captain Jimmy Aitken said that "Brook Hannah defeated Collingwood's Pannam pointless and had worked over Geelong's McCallum in a similar fashion two weeks earlier."

After retiring from playing football, Hannah joined the China Inland Mission as an ordained missionary, and served as an assistant superintendent to Bishop Mowll of the Anglican Diocese of Szechwan. He survived the attacks on foreign Christian missionaries during the Boxer Rebellion. He later worked in Tanganyika (now part of Tanzania). Hannah served as a missionary for over 50 years before retiring to Tunbridge Wells in England with his wife, May, an English-born missionary, where he died on 14 January 1961.

== Personal life ==
Brook Hannah met his future wife May, also a missionary, in China. The couple married around 1904. They had three sons, Emmanuel David and John, both died in infancy.

== See also ==
- Anglicanism in Sichuan
- Protestantism in Tanzania
- Muscular Christianity
