= Gospel Church, Zhenjiang =

- 镇江市福音堂
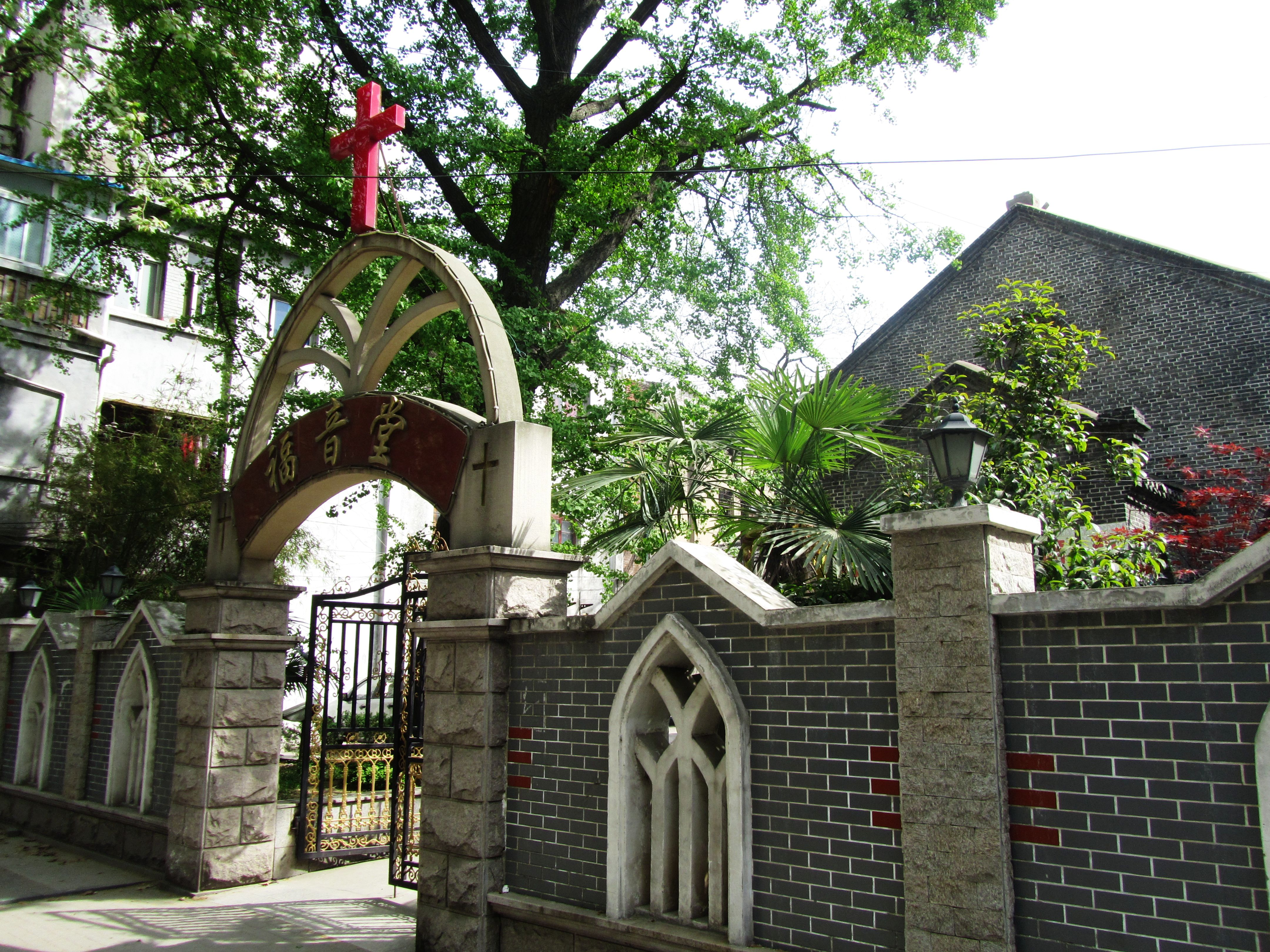
- Gospel Church, Zhenjiang in 2013

- Location in Jiangsu
- 32°13′01″N 119°26′46″E
- Location: Runzhou District, Zhenjiang, Jiangsu, China
- Denomination: Protestantism

History
- Status: Parish church
- Founded: 1889
- Founder: Carl Frederick Kupfer

Architecture
- Functional status: Active
- Architectural type: Church building

Specifications
- Materials: Granite, bricks

Chinese name
- Simplified Chinese: 镇江市福音堂
- Traditional Chinese: 鎮江市福音堂
Transcriptions
Standard Mandarin
- Hanyu Pinyin: Zhènjiāngshì Fúyīntáng

Gospel Church, Daxi Road
- Chinese: 大西路福音堂
Transcriptions
Standard Mandarin
- Hanyu Pinyin: Dàxīlù Fúyīntáng

Gospel Church, Zhenjiang (Chinese: 镇江市福音堂), locally known as Gospel Church, Daxi Road (大西路福音堂), is a Protestant church located in Runzhou District of Zhenjiang, Jiangsu, China.

== History ==
In 1889, the Methodist Episcopal Church bought four mu lands to build the Gospel Church and its annex Chongdao School (崇道学校), designing by American missionary Carl Frederick Kupfer (郎登·库思非). The new church is 1,216.92 square metres (13,098.8 sq ft), which can accommodate up to 1,000 Protestants.

During the Second Sino-Japanese War, the church sheltered a large number of refugees from the impending Japanese slaughter. The church was looted when the Imperial Japanese Army occupied Jiangsu.

The church was closed during the ten-year Cultural Revolution and was officially reopened to the public in 1980. In May 1982, it was designated as a municipal cultural relic preservation organ by the Zhenjiang government.

== Gallery ==
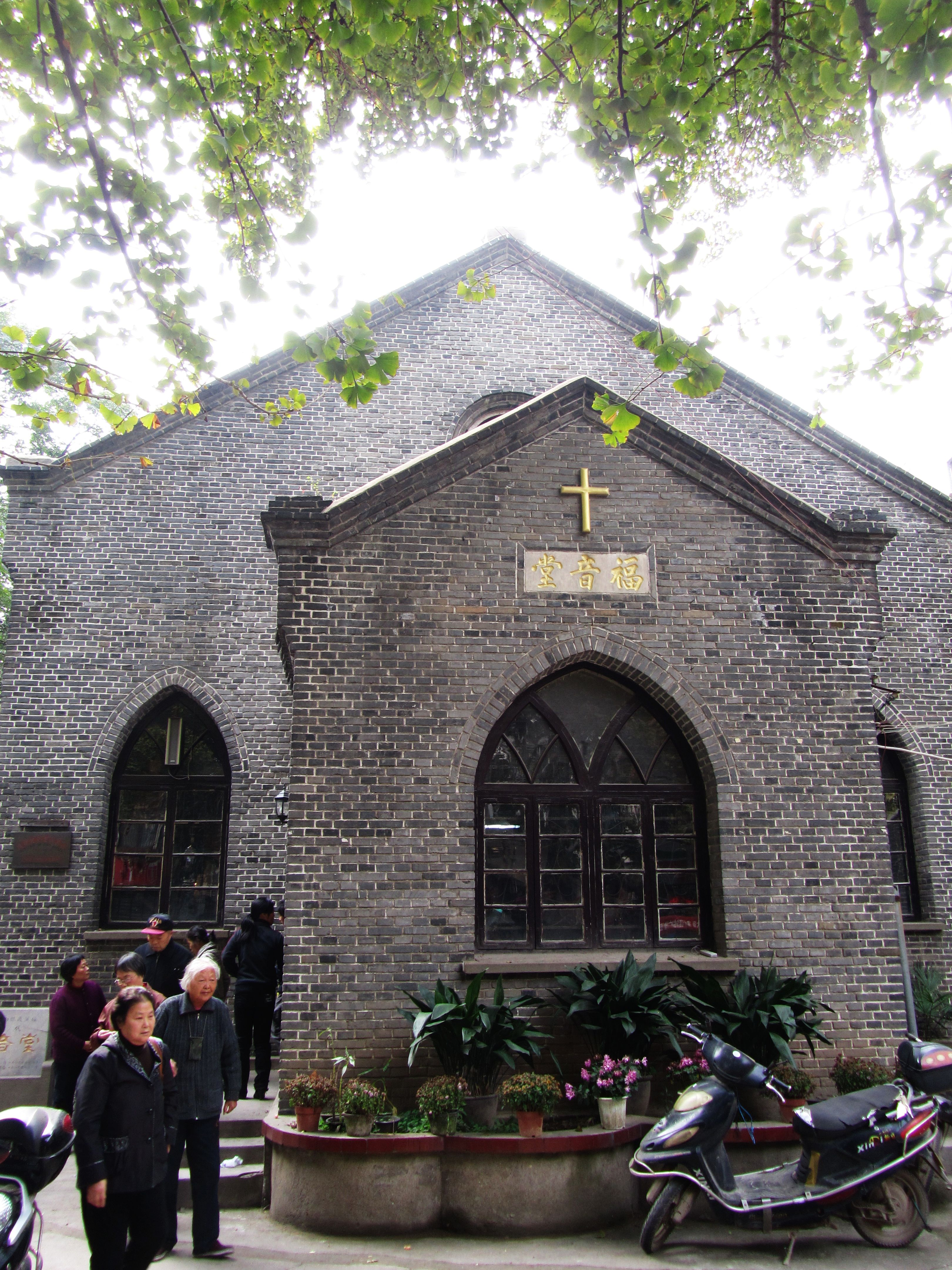
Entrance

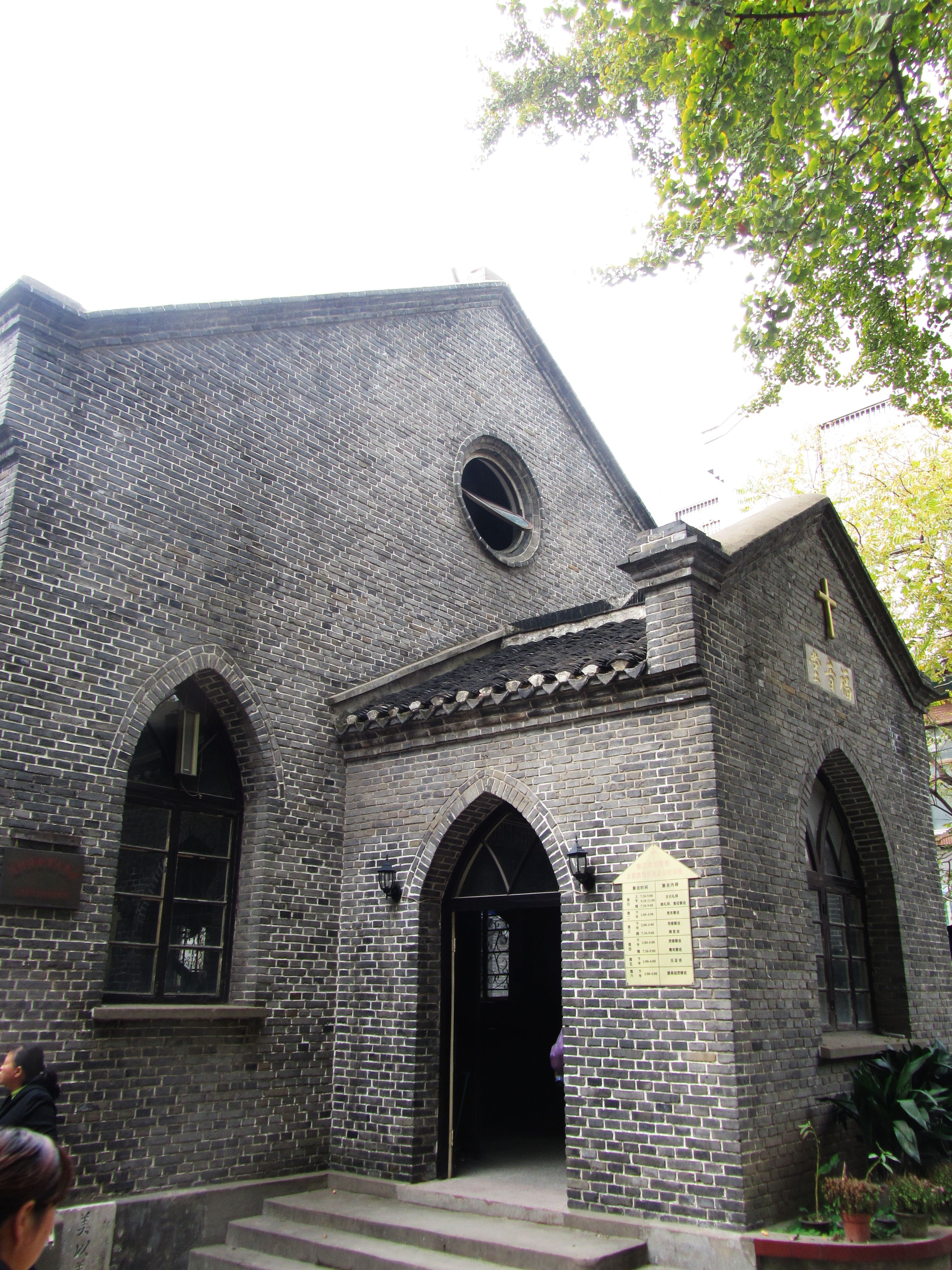
Entrance

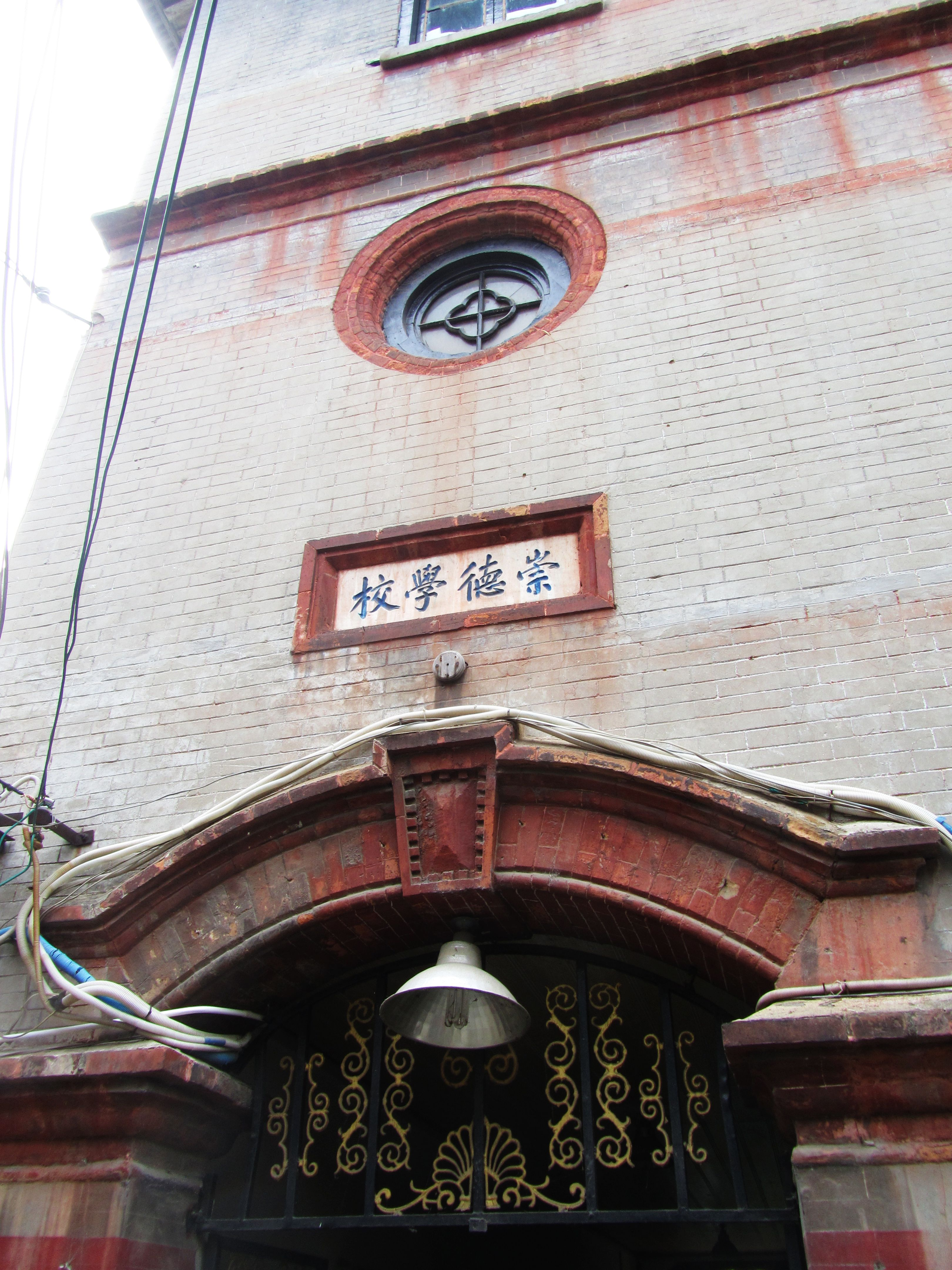
Chongdao School
