= John Curtis (bishop) =

Irish missionary and bishop

The Right Reverend Dr. John Curtis (15 March 1880 – 11 July 1962) was an Irish missionary of the Anglican Church and bishop of Chekiang, China from 1929 to 1950.

Born in Dublin on 15 March 1880, Curtis was educated at Trinity College, Dublin and earned the Trinity Master of Arts (MA Dubl) degree. He later became a Doctor of Divinity.

After his ordination in 1904 he was a curate at Christ Church, Leeson Park in his home city. He then joined the Dublin University Mission to Fukien.

Curtis married Eda Bryan-Brown, a fellow missionary and medical doctor, in Funing in 1914. From 1917 to 1918 Curtis was a Temporary Chaplain to the Forces serving in Salonika. He was appointed Bishop of Chekiang in 1929 and held the position until 1950, during which period the Nationalist, Communist and Japanese armies fought over the country.

Curtis and his wife were sent to a Japanese prison camp for civilians in 1942. He was transferred to another prison for "dangerous persons", while his wife remained interned in the civilian camp. They returned to England in 1950.

Curtis then became Vicar of Wilden, a small village near Stourport-on-Severn in Worcestershire. He retired in 1957.

Curtis and his wife had two children. Handicapped by severe arthritis in his retirement, he died on 11 July 1962 at age 82 at Leamington Spa. His widow died on 18 January 1964.

Church of England titles
| Preceded by Herbert Molony | Bishop of Chekiang; 1929–1949 | Succeeded by Kimber Den |
