= Herbert Molony =

Herbert James Molony (2 June 1865 – 22 July 1939) was a missionary of the Anglican Church.

Born in Dublin, Molony was educated at Leamington School and Pembroke College, Cambridge (whence he gained his Cambridge Master of Arts {MA Cantab}). He was ordained in 1888. He was a Curate at St Stephen's Newcastle upon Tyne then a CMS Missionary in Mandla. From 1905 to 1907 he was Examining Chaplain to the Bishop of Nagpur when he became Bishop in Chekiang, a post he held for 20 years. Returning to England he was Rector of Teston until 1937.

He died on 22 July 1939; he had become a Doctor of Divinity (DD).

Church of England titles
Preceded by George Moule	Bishop of Chekiang; 1908–1928	Succeeded by John Curtis
