= Audrey Donnithorne =

British-Chinese political economist and missionary (1922–2020)

- Audrey Donnithorne in 1958
- Born: 27 November 1922; Santai County, Sichuan, Republican China
- Died: 9 June 2020 (aged 97); Hong Kong
- Education: Somerville College, Oxford
- Occupations: political economist, missionary
- Notable work: China's Economic System; China, In Life's Foreground
- Parents: Vyvyan Donnithorne (father); Gladys Emma Ingram (mother)

Chinese name
- Traditional Chinese: 董育德
- Simplified Chinese: 董育德
Transcriptions
Standard Mandarin
- Hanyu Pinyin: Dǒng Yùdé
- Wade–Giles: Tung Yü-tê

Audrey Gladys Donnithorne (27 November 1922, Santai County, Sichuan, Republic of China – 9 June 2020, Hong Kong) was a British-Chinese political economist and missionary, prominent in her efforts to rebuild the Catholic Church in China—particularly the Catholic Church in Sichuan—after the Cultural Revolution.

== Early life and education ==
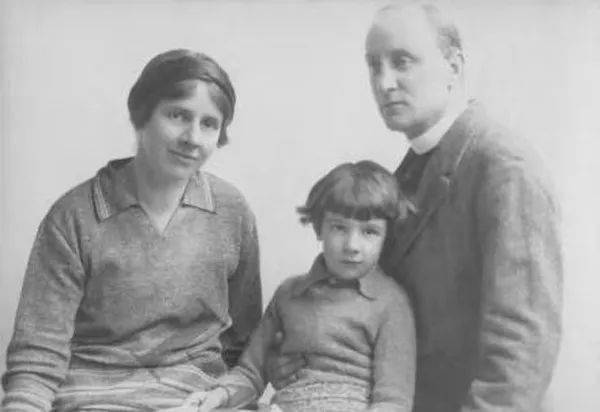
Audrey and her parents, before 1927

The daughter of evangelical Anglican missionaries Vyvyan Donnithorne and Gladys Emma Ingram, born in 1922 at a Quaker mission hospital in Santai (formerly known as Tungchwan), Audrey grew up in Sichuan where she and her parents were kidnapped by bandits when she was two years old. They and six others were led into the mountains with their necks in a halter. In 1927, the family was forced to leave China as Kuomintang forces pushed northwards.

When World War II broke out, she headed from the UK, where she received education, to France and sailed to China to her family in 1940. Dissatisfied with the Protestant religious life on the campus of West China Union University, she came into contact with Eusebius Arnaiz, a member of the Spanish Redemptorist community active in the Apostolic Vicariate of Chengdu, and received some books from the latter. She converted to Catholicism in 1943, and was baptised at the Cathedral of the Immaculate Conception in Chengdu. She later travelled through Japanese-occupied Burma by plane in order to reach her home country. Back in the UK, Donnithorne worked for the War Office. She then moved to Somerville College, Oxford where she studied philosophy, politics and economics (PPE), meeting Margaret Thatcher who she succeeded as college secretary for the Conservative Party.

== Career ==
Donnithorne then became a successful academic at University College London and in 1969 she moved to Australia to work at the Australian National University where she was head of the Contemporary China Center. Her magnum opus was China's Economic System. She was in Israel when the Yom Kippur War broke out in 1973. In Australia she received Vietnamese boat people in her house. After her retirement in 1985 she moved to Hong Kong. In 1997, the Chinese government expelled her from the mainland for her activities; she remained in contact with church leaders there. She worked with the 2008 Sichuan earthquake victims – establishing a fund for the rebuilding of churches and Catholic facilities with the backing of Hong Kong cardinal Joseph Zen – and with the Church in China. She also became an honorary member of the Centre of Asian Studies at the University of Hong Kong. She later wrote memoirs, entitled China, In Life's Foreground.

The Vatican awarded her the Pro Ecclesia et Pontifice medal in 1993, and in 1995, she became an honorary member of the Paris Foreign Missions Society (MEP). She died in Hong Kong on 9 June 2020. Her funeral Mass was celebrated by Cardinal John Tong Hon and Cardinal Emeritus Joseph Zen on 26 June at St. Joseph's Church, Hong Kong. A memorial Mass was held in Sacred Heart Cathedral of Sichuan's Nanchong Diocese on 10 June, the day after her death, conducted by Bishop Joseph Chen Gong'ao.

== Selected works ==
- China in Life's Foreground, Australian Scholarly Publishing, 2019, ISBN 978-1-92-580157-6
- Centre-Provincial Economic Relations in China, Contemporary China Centre, Research School of Pacific Studies, Australian National University, 1981
- The Budget and the Plan in China: Central-Local Economic Relations, Australian National University Press, 1972
- China's Economic System, Praeger Publishers, 1967; Reprint edition (2016): Taylor & Francis, ISBN 978-1-13-899127-9
- (with George Cyril Allen) Western enterprise in Indonesia and Malaya: a study in economic development, 1957; Reprint edition (2021): Creative Media Partners, ISBN 978-1-01-505533-9
- (with George Cyril Allen) Western enterprise in Far Eastern economic development: China and Japan, 1954; Reprint edition (2015): Routledge, ISBN 978-1-13-887859-4

== See also ==
- Anglicanism in Sichuan
- Catholic Church in Hong Kong
