= Geoffrey Iliff =

Geoffrey Durnford Iliff was an Anglican missionary bishop in China from 1903 to 1920.

Illif was born into an ecclesiastical family on 7 October 1867. He was educated at St Edmund's School, Canterbury and ordained in 1892. He was a missionary in China from then until 1920, the last 17 years as Bishop of Shandong. Returning to England he was the vicar of Goole until 1928 and Archdeacon of Hereford until 1941. He died on 10 June 1946.
