= Thomas Scott (bishop of North China) =

Thomas Arnold Scott was an Anglican missionary bishop in China during the first half of the twentieth century.

Scott was born on 9 June 1879, and educated at Leeds Grammar School, Felsted School and Christ's College, Cambridge. He was ordained deacon in 1902 and priest in 1903. After a curacy at St Paul, Halifax he was SPG missionary in China from 1908 to 1950. In 1913 he became the headmaster of the Church of England school in Peking and then in 1921 Bishop of Shantung. In 1940 he was translated to North China, retiring in 1950. He died on 29 March 1956.
