= Henry Jackson Yue =

New Zealand teacher, translator and consul

Henry Jackson Yue (Chinese: 余職慎; 15 July 1881 – 30 October 1955) was a New Zealand teacher, translator and consul. He was born in 1881 in Roxburgh, New Zealand, and died in 1955 in Paekakariki, New Zealand.
