= Bishop of Chekiang =

The Bishop of Chekiang, exercised episcopal leadership over the Diocese of Chekiang of the Anglican Church in China. The diocese, similar in extent to the present-day Zhejiang, was originally established as part of the Church of England.

The first bishop was appointed in 1908 following the resignation of George Moule as Bishop of Mid-China.

In 1918 Tsae-seng Sing, archdeacon of Chekiang from 1910 to 1918, was consecrated as assistant Bishop of the diocese, becoming the first ethnic Chinese bishop in the Anglican communion.

In 1958 the last Bishop of Chekiang, K. H. Ting, lost his diocese when all Anglican and other Protestant Christian denominations were compulsorily merged into the Three-Self Patriotic Movement. However, Ting remained President emeritus of the China Christian Council until his death in 2012.

== List of Bishops of Chekiang ==
Bishops of Chekiang
From	Until	Incumbent	Notes
1908	1928	Herbert James Molony	Previously a missionary in India
1929	1950	John Curtis	Previously a member of the Dublin University Mission to Fukien, 1909–28
1950	1955	Kimber Den	Imprisoned 1952, released 1956.
1955	1958	K. H. Ting	Previously principal of the Nanking Union Theological Seminary. Never replaced.
