= Runzhou, Zhenjiang =

Runzhou 润州区
- District
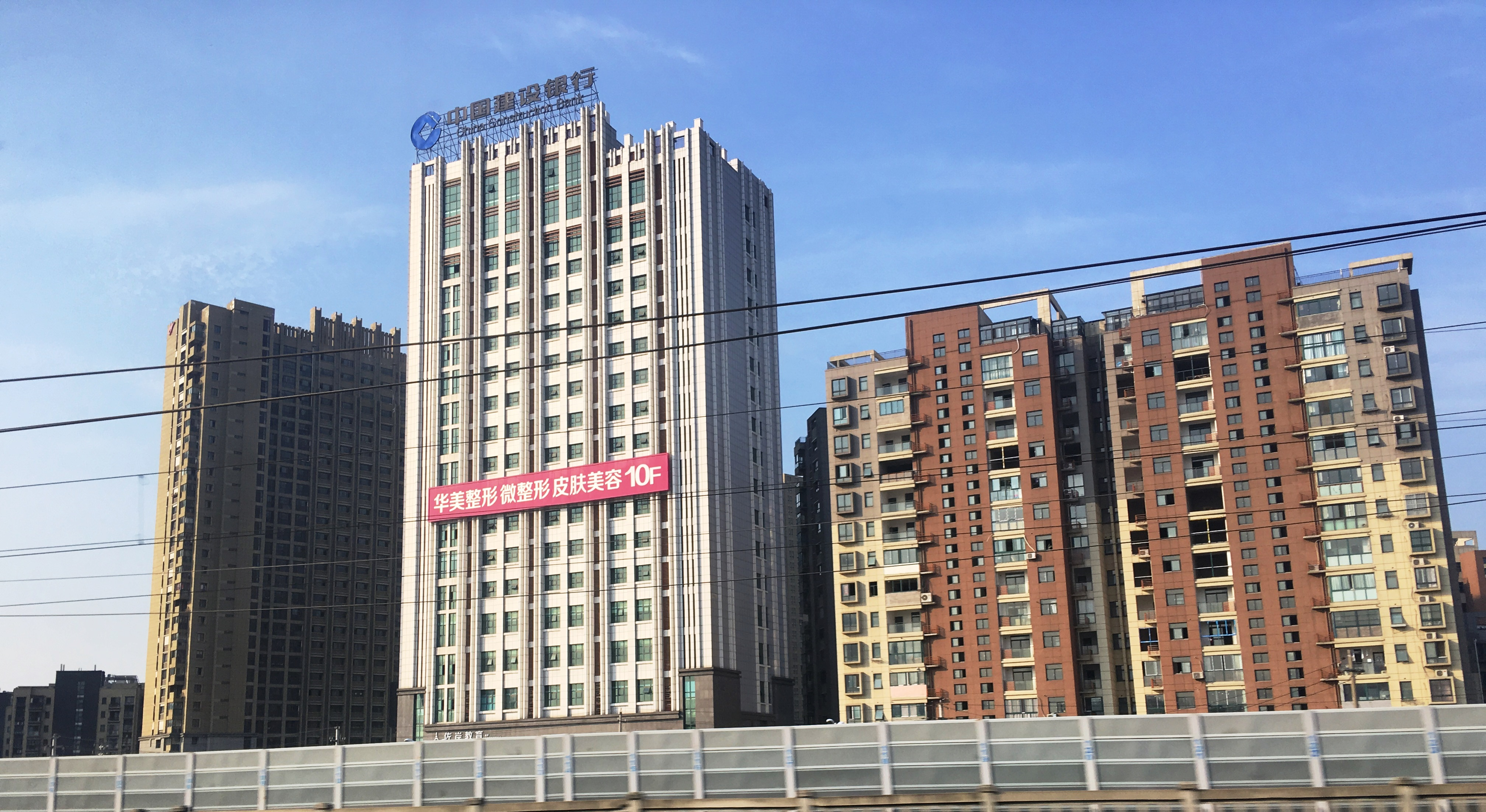
- Runzhou District in July 2017

- Location in Jiangsu
- Coordinates: 32°11′30″N 119°24′45″E
- Country: People's Republic of China
- Province: Jiangsu
- Prefecture-level city: Zhenjiang

Area
  - Total: 132.68 km^{2} (51.23 sq mi)

Population (2020 census)
  - Total: 299,956
  - Density: 2,260.7/km^{2} (5,855.3/sq mi)
- Time zone: UTC+8 (China Standard)
- Postal code: 212004

Runzhou District (simplified Chinese: 润州区; traditional Chinese: 潤州區; pinyin: Rùnzhōu Qū) is one of three districts of Zhenjiang, Jiangsu Province, China.

To the east of Runzhou lies the Grand Canal and Jingkou District with Zhenjiang New District to the southeast. The district has an area of 132.68 km^{2}. By the end of 2020, the total population was 299,956 people.

== Administrative divisions ==
At present, Runzhou District has 7 subdistricts.

7 subdistricts

- Baotalu (宝塔路街道)
- Hepinglu (和平路街道)
- Qilidian (七里甸街道)
- Jinshan (金山街道)
- Jiangqiao (蒋乔街道)
- Guantangqiao (官塘桥街道)
- Weigang (韦岗街道)
