= Wanhsien incident =

1926 maritime conflicts on the Yangtze River

The Wanhsien incident of 1926 was a series of maritime conflicts on the Yangtze river between British merchant shipping and regional Chinese military leaders, culminating in a battle with Royal Navy gunboats, which also fired cannons into the city of Wanxian (romanized as "Wanhsien" at the time).

== Background ==
In 1926, while China was in the midst of a civil war known as the Warlord Era, Sichuan province, surrounded by mountains, was fighting its own civil war in which local militants were backed by various Chinese warlords. In May, Chinese Marshal Wu Peifu, facing an imminent threat from Chiang Kai-shek's Northern Expedition campaign, appointed General Yang Sen as the Governor of Sichuan. The latter had used British commercial shipping to transport troops along stretches of the river Yangtze.

== Incident ==
On August 27, Sen attempted to board large numbers of his soldiers onto the China Navigation Company steamer Wanhsien, which was anchored in its namesake city. The captain of nearby gunboat HMS Cockchafer went aboard and persuaded the Chinese officers involved to disembark with their troops. On 29 August, Chinese troops attempted to board the steamer Wanliu at Yunyang, upon which the crew of the ship attempted to take avoiding action so as to proceed upstream to HMS Cockchafer. In the confusion as the ship pulled away, two Chinese sampans were sunk. According to the account of Wellington Koo, sixty-four Chinese were killed as the sampans capsized, whilst 85 thousand dollars' worth of silver was lost. Following the sinking, General Yang Sen personally commandeered Wanliu with his troops. Yang demanded compensation for the soldiers drowned and monetary loss incurred by the loss of the ships. HMS Cockchafer then sent a force of Royal Marines to retake Wanliu, disarmed the Chinese soldiers, and sent the ship on its way without providing any form of compensation. Subsequently, Sen commandeered Wanhsien and Wantung, ostensibly as compensation for the earlier loss. The British consul from Chongqing, and Commander Acheson of the Royal Navy were unable to broker a negotiation with the defiant Yang. The latter emplaced reinforcements and field artillery along both banks of the river.

Considering that the crews of the two merchant vessels were in extreme danger, and the public killing of a Chinese Royal Navy sailor, the British decided to take forceful naval action to regain the ships. The gunboat HMS Widgeon arrived, then chartered armed steamer Kiawo, to reinforce HMS Cockchafer. On 5 September, these three vessels attempted to board the recapture the detained river steamers, and opened fire on the Chinese troops. The Chinese fought back ferociously on the ships, and opened fire from the riverside. The British gunners responded, and a substantial local battle developed. After rescuing the crews, but unable to secure the steamers, the three Royal Navy vessels withdrew. Seven naval and one merchant sailor had been killed, with numerous wounded. In a letter to the British government, Wellington Koo stated that nearly 1,000 Chinese military personnel and civilians were killed or wounded in the fighting, with more than 1,000 buildings in the city destroyed by British gunfire.

The Chinese government lodged a formal protest at the bombardment of a civil port, decried the unnecessary use of force to resolve the dispute, and claimed the attack was a premeditated act of violence. The matter was discussed in the British parliament, with Foreign Secretary Sir Austen Chamberlain declaring that the Royal Navy action was against engaged military targets.
