= St John's Church, Chengdu =

- Shangxiang Christian Church
- 聖約翰堂
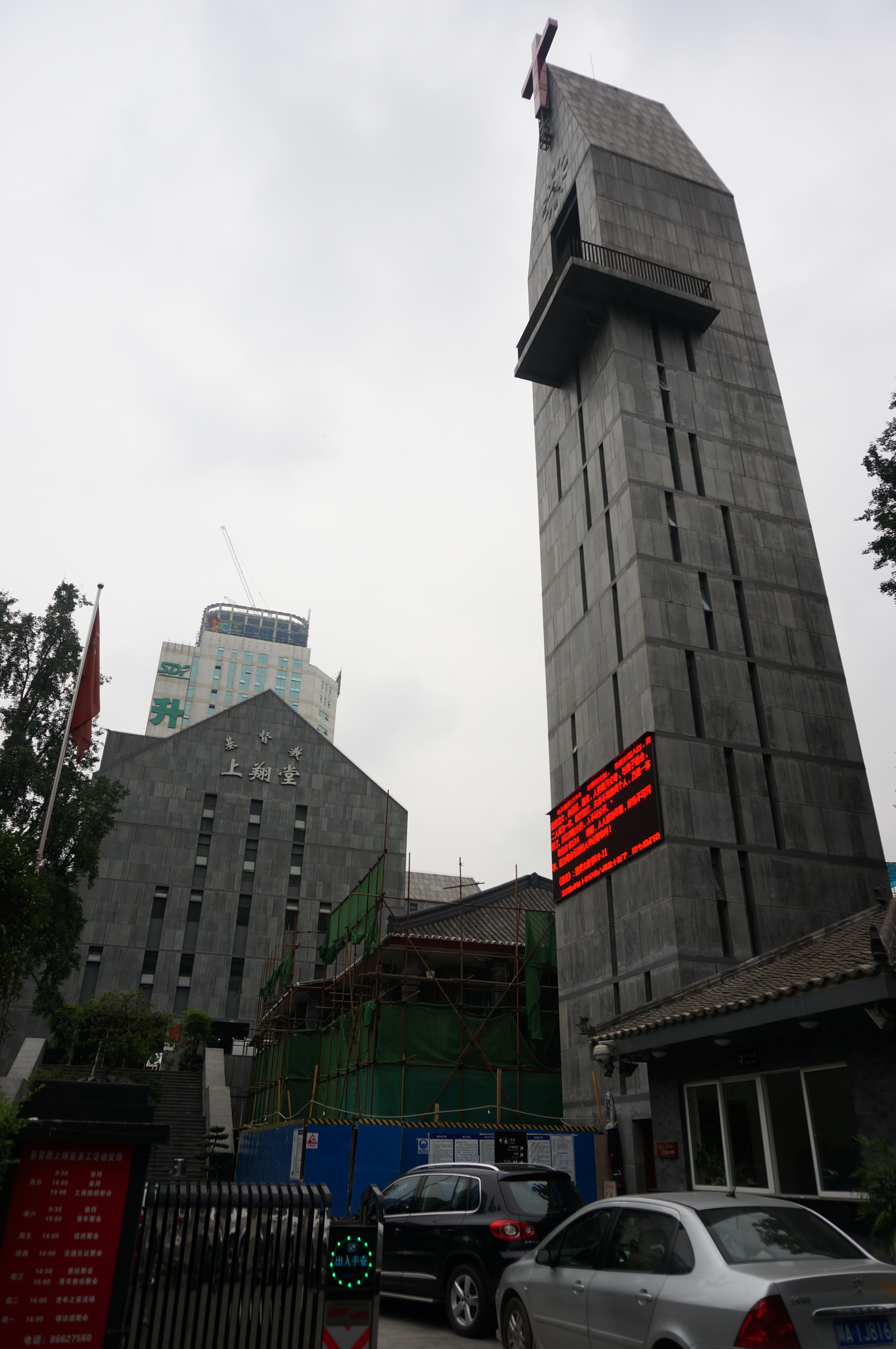
- St John's Church, Chengdu
- 30.6635°N 104.0678°E
- Location: 20 Shangxiang Street, Qingyang District, Chengdu, Sichuan
- Country: China
- Denomination: Three-Self Church (Protestant)
- Previous denomination: Anglican
- Churchmanship: Low church evangelical

History
- Status: Church
- Founded: 1909
- Founder(s): William Cassels; A H Wilkinson
- Dedication: John the Evangelist

Architecture
- Functional status: Active
- Style: Neo-Gothic; Minimalist

Administration
- Province: China (formerly)
- Diocese: Szechwan (formerly); West Szechwan (formerly; since 1936)

St John's Church, (Note: traditional Chinese: 聖約翰堂; simplified Chinese: 圣约翰堂; pinyin: Shèngyuēhàn táng; Wade–Giles: Shêng⁴-yüeh¹-han⁴ tʽang²; Sichuanese romanization: Shen^{4} Io^{5} Han^{4} Tʽang^{2}.) today known as Shangxiang Christian Church, (Note: Chinese: 上翔堂; pinyin: Shàngxiáng táng; Sichuanese romanization: Shang^{4} Siang^{2} Tʽang^{2}.) is a Protestant church situated on Shangxiang Street in the city of Chengdu, Sichuan Province. Founded in 1909, the church had been the seat of the Anglican Bishop of West Szechwan, practically making it the cathedral of this bishopric. It has been subjected to the control of the state-sanctioned Three-Self Patriotic Church since 1954.

== History ==
At the close of 1891, the Rev J H Horsburgh of the Church Missionary Society (CMS) of Church of England, along with other missionaries, entered Sichuan as the first band of CMS missionaries to take up work in that province, and later in charge of the western district of Sichuan.

The Diocese of Western China was established in 1895, and William Cassels, one of the Cambridge Seven, became the first diocesan bishop, ordained by the Archbishop of Canterbury (Edward White Benson). In 1909, Cassels purchased a land near Xishuncheng Street, in Chengdu, for building the Fu Jen School. After the school's closure in 1926, a chapel was added to the building, and a second storey added in 1939. The building had completed its conversion from a school into a church, and renamed St John's.

The church was bombed in World War II. In 1946, the plan of building a large chapel in front of the church was unsuccessful, but it was restored and communal worship services resumed shortly after. In 1954, the communist government established the 'self-governance, self-support, and self-propagation' Three-Self Patriotic Church, Christian Churches in China were forced to sever their ties with respective overseas Churches, which has thus led to the merging of St John's into Three-Self Church.

In 1992, the church was demolished, in order to support a street extension project. Reconstruction was completed in 2011. The new church is built in the fusion of neo-Gothic and Minimalist architectural styles, and is the largest Protestant church building in Chengdu.

== Gallery ==
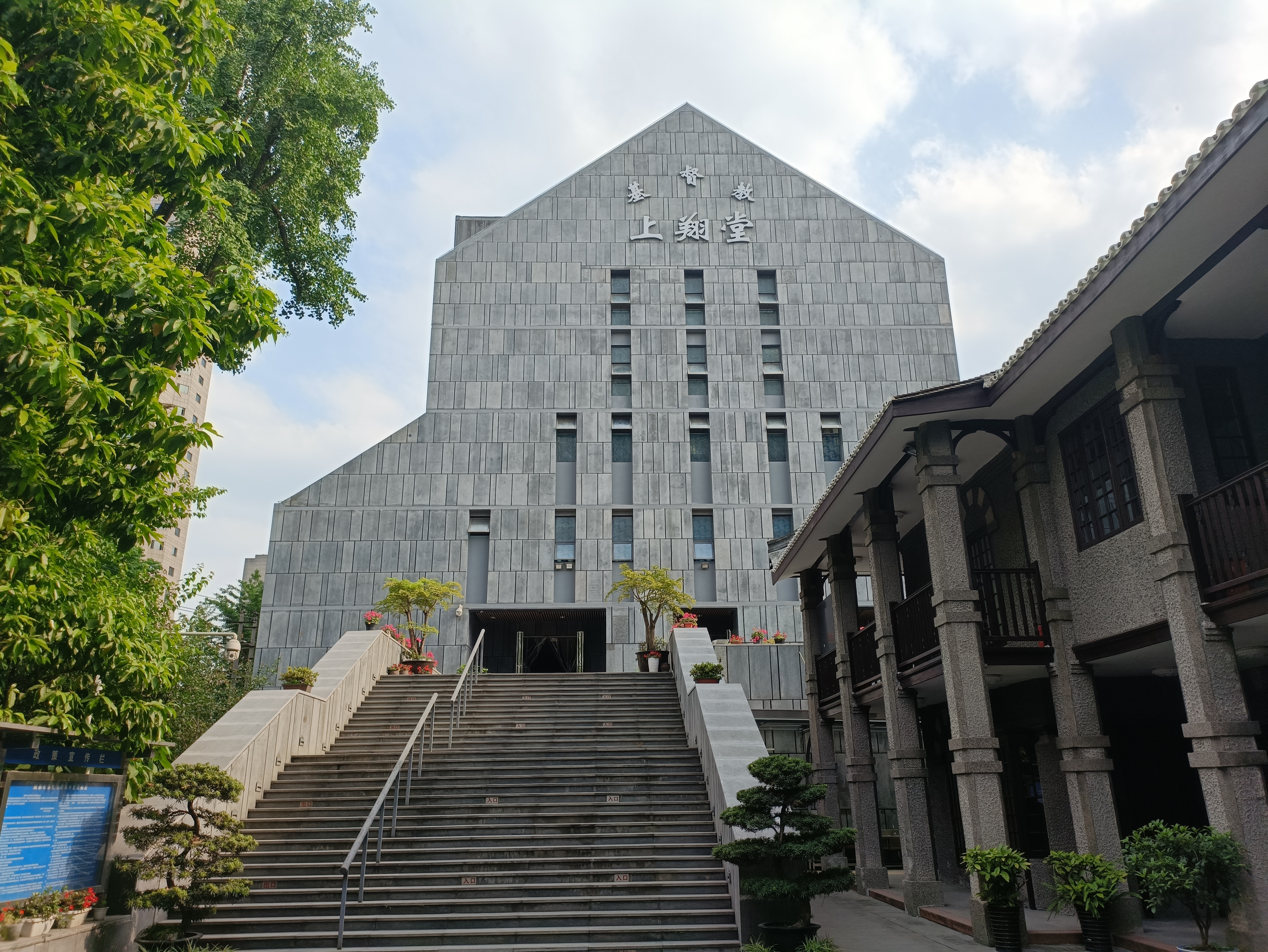
Exterior of St John's

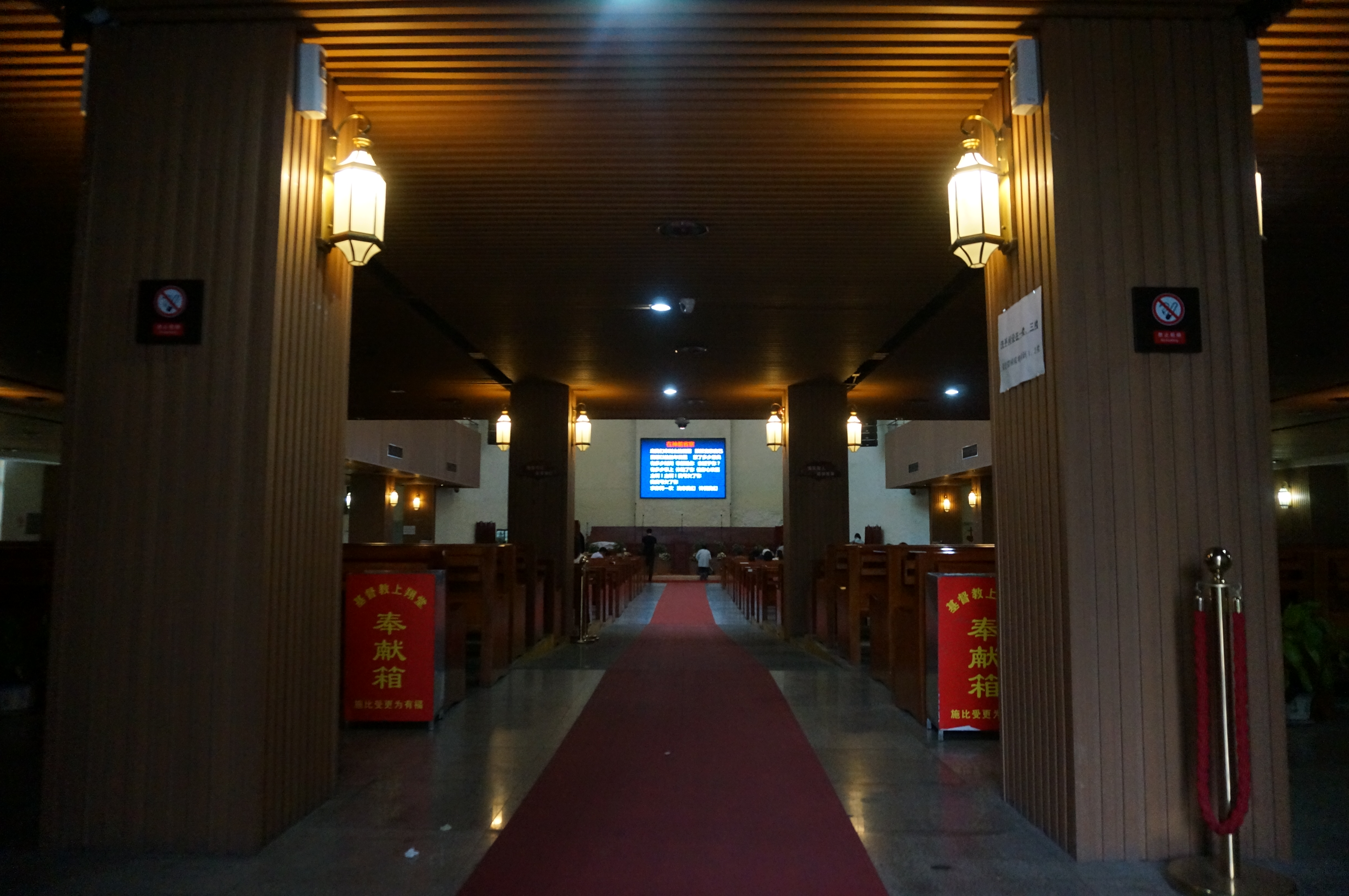
Interior of St John's

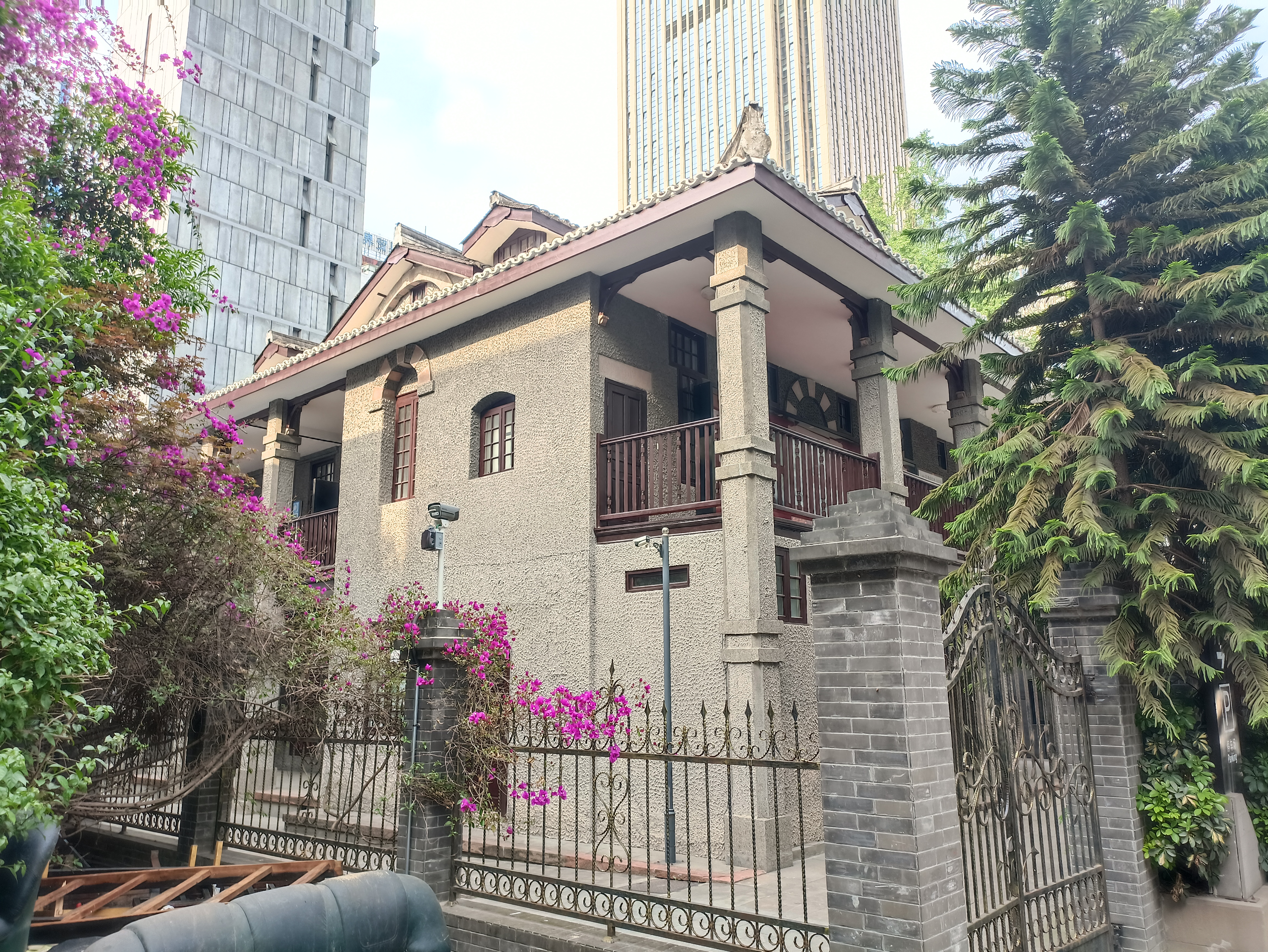
Museum of Protestantism, former Bishop's House

== See also ==
- Anglicanism in Sichuan
- Sï-Shen-Tsï Methodist Church, Chengdu
- Category:Former Anglican church buildings in Sichuan
- St John's Cathedral, Langzhong – former cathedral of East Szechwan
- Immaculate Conception Cathedral, Chengdu – Catholic cathedral of the Diocese of Chengdu
