= Diocese of Western China =

Anglican diocese of the Church in China

Diocese of Western China Diocese of Szechwan (Diocese of East Szechwan; Diocese of West Szechwan) 聖公會華西教區 聖公會四川教區 (聖公會東川教區; 聖公會西川教區)
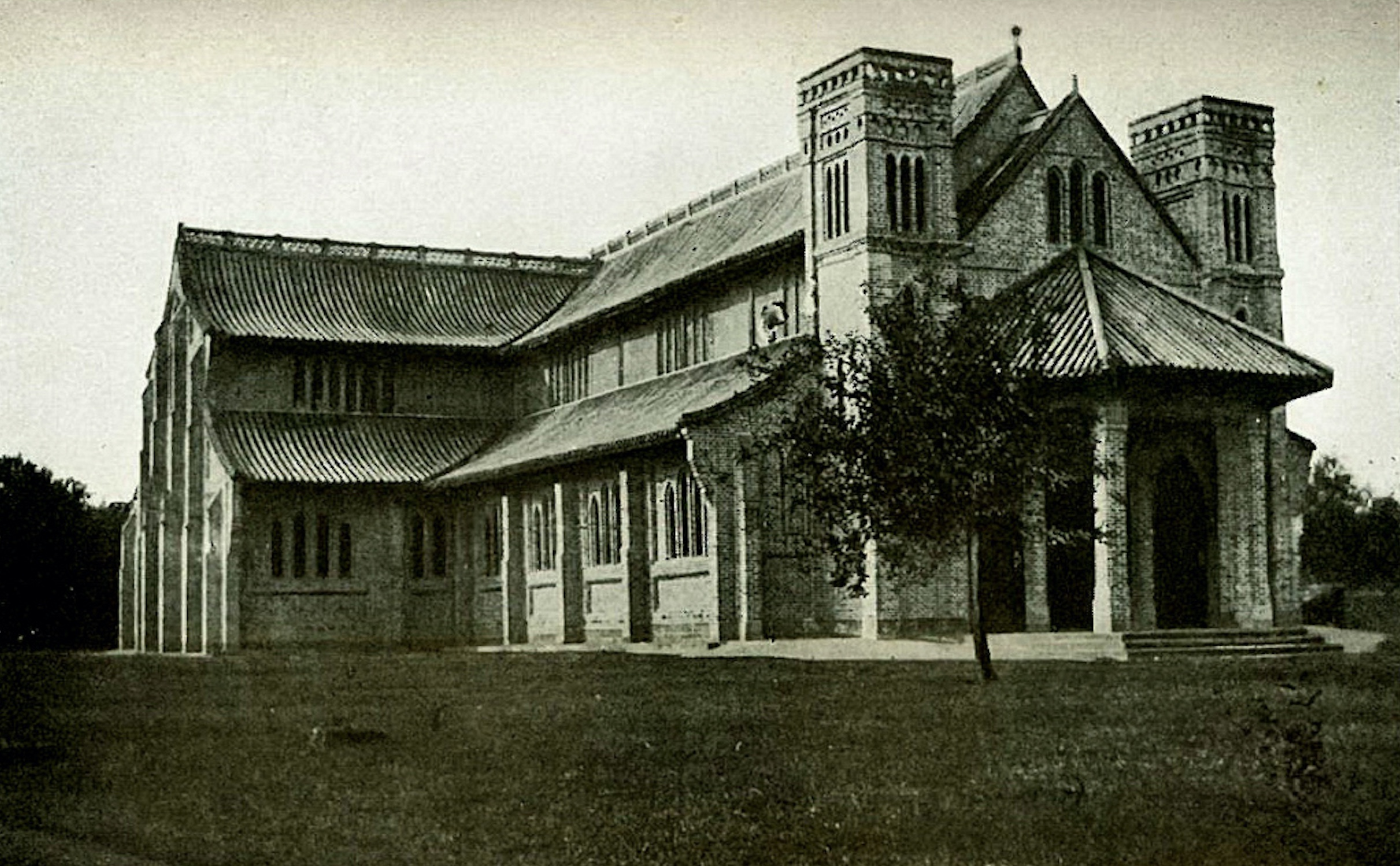
- The diocesan cathedral, circa 1914

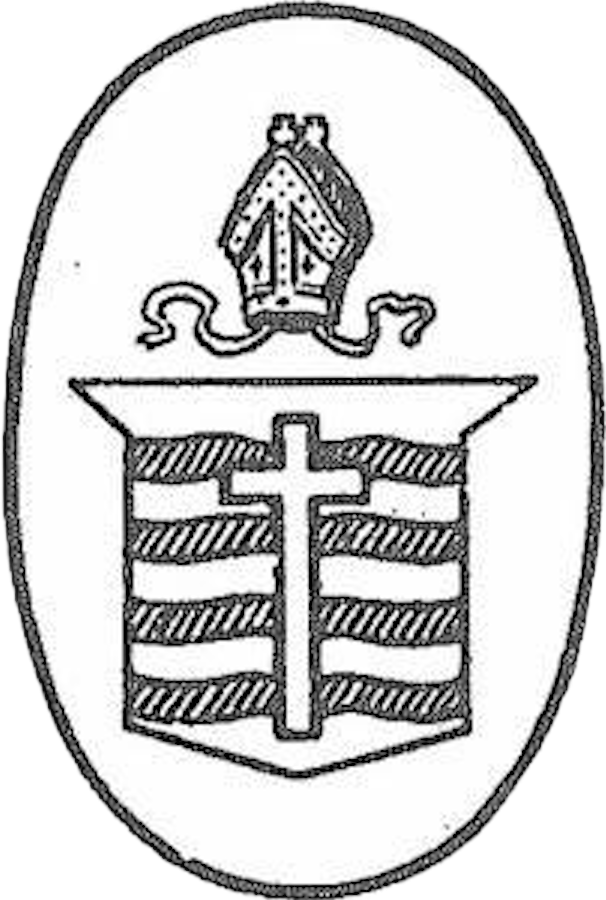
- Diocesan seal

Location
- Country: Qing and Republican China
- Territory: Szechwan
- Ecclesiastical province: Church in China
- Headquarters: Paoning

Information
- Denomination: Anglican
- Rite: Anglican Rite
- Established: 1895
- Dissolved: c. 1958
- Cathedral: St John's Cathedral, Paoning (Western China & East Szechwan); St John's Cathedral, Chengtu (West Szechwan)
- Language: English, Szechwanese
- Parent church: Church of England

The Diocese of Western China (Chinese: 聖公會華西教區; Wade–Giles: Shêng Kung Hui Hua Hsi Chiao Chʽü; lit. 'Anglican Diocese of Western China'), also known as Diocese of Szechwan (Chinese: 聖公會四川教區; Wade–Giles: Shêng Kung Hui Ssu Chʽuan Chiao Chʽü; lit. 'Anglican Diocese of Szechwan') or Hua Hsi Diocese (華西教區), was an Anglican diocese in late-Qing-dynasty and Republican China, established in 1895, under the supervision of the Church of England. It had belonged to the Church in China since its outset, and had been part of the Chinese Anglican Church since 1912. In 1936, it was divided into the Diocese of East Szechwan (聖公會東川教區) and Diocese of West Szechwan (聖公會西川教區).

== History ==
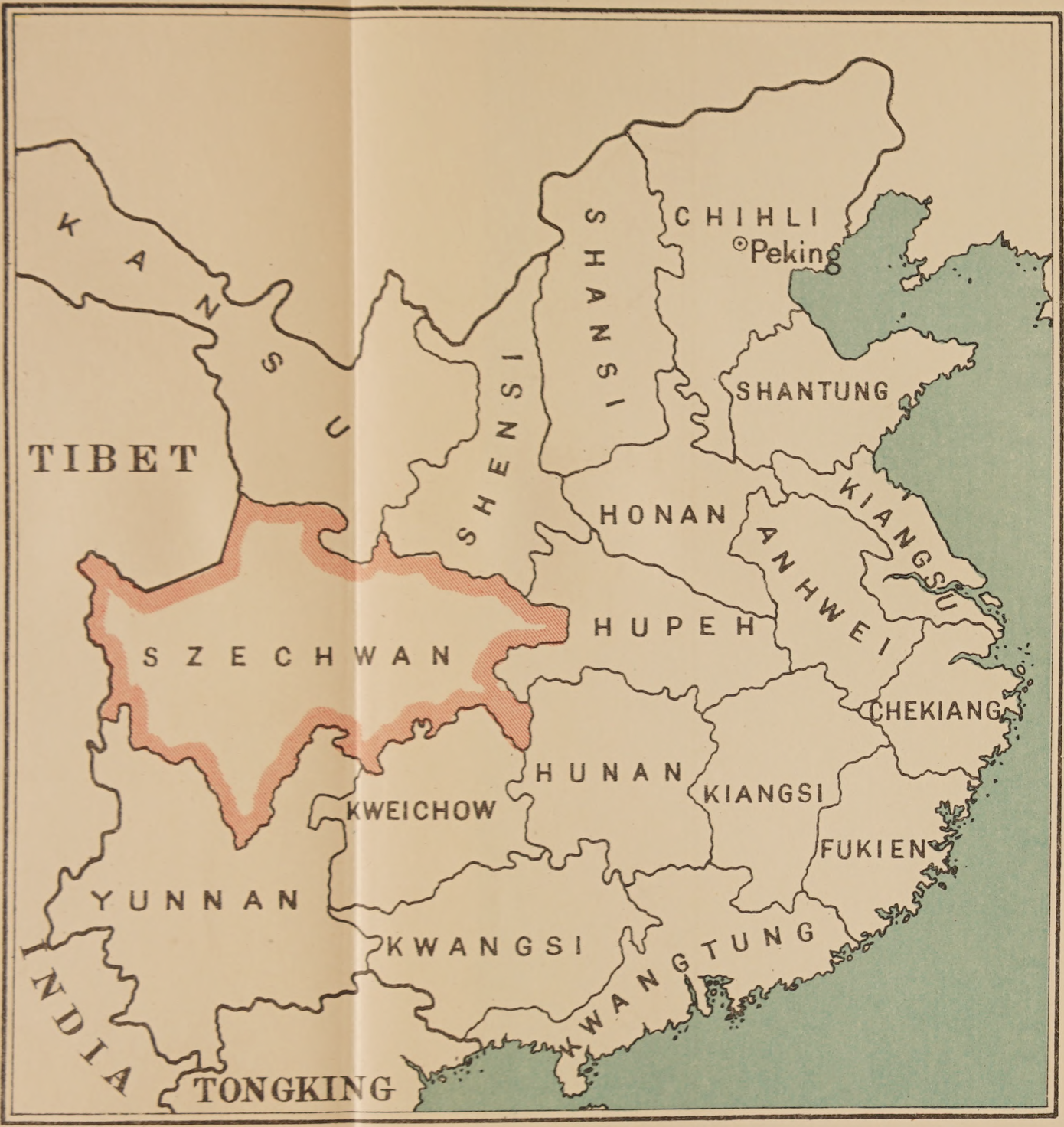
Location of Szechwan within China, map in W. W. Cassels: First Bishop in Western China, by Marshall Broomhall.

The Cambridge Seven, who were missionaries to China through the China Inland Mission (CIM), arrived in Shanghai in 1885. Four of them —William Cassels, Arthur T. Polhill-Turner, Cecil H. Polhill-Turner, and Montagu Proctor-Beauchamp— were sent up by the CIM into the Western Province of Szechwan, where they established a proper Church of England diocese. Arthur's elder brother, Cecil, felt drawn towards the people of Tibet, went to Tatsienlu, a Khams Tibetan city located in western Szechwan, and he had laboured on the Sino and Indo-Tibetan borders since then.

At the close of 1891, Rev. James Heywood Horsburgh of the Church Missionary Society (CMS), along with his wife Mrs Horsburgh, Rev. O. M. Jackson, three laymen, and six single women missionaries, entered Szechwan as the first band of CMS missionaries to take up work in that province. By 1894, CMS work had started in Mienchow, Chungpa, Anhsien, Mienchu and Sintu, all of which are in the west of the region. Meanwhile the CIM workers, based in Paoning, were also breaking ground in East Szechwan.

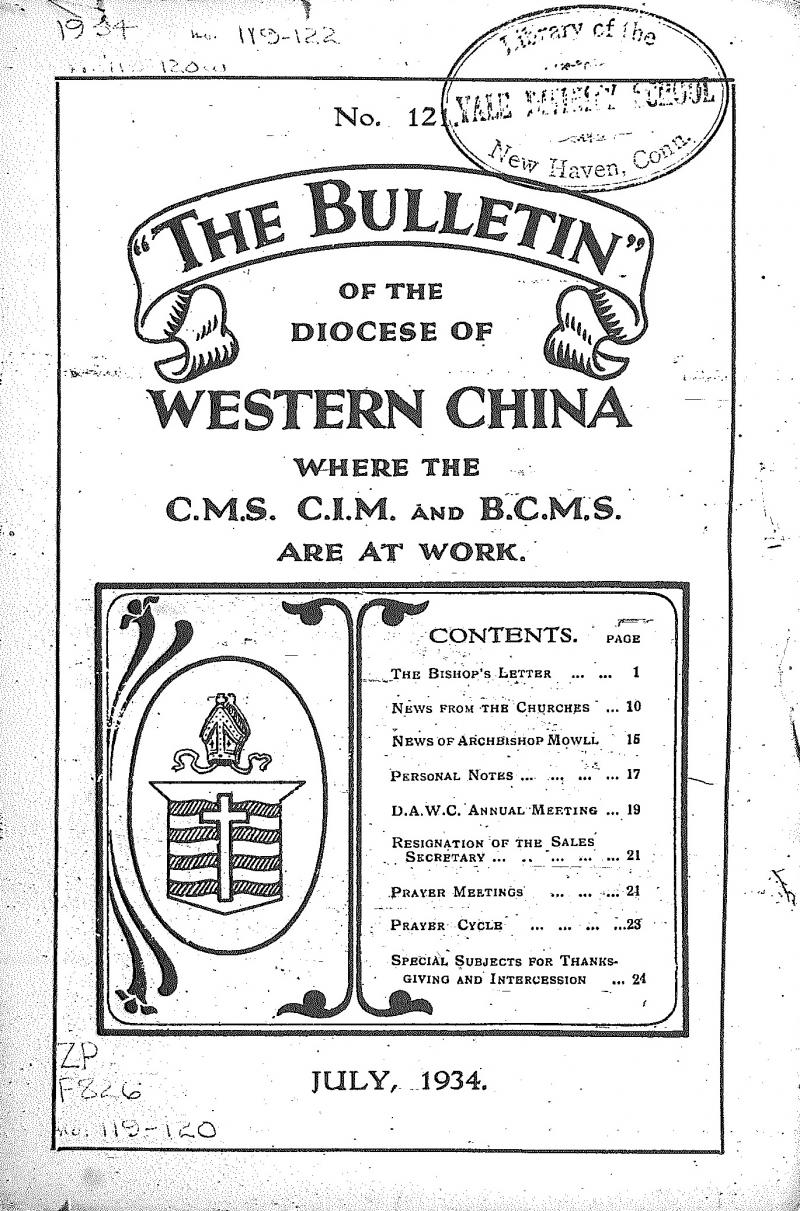
The Bulletin of the Diocese of Western China (№ 121) published in July 1934.

In 1895, steps were taken for the formation of a new diocese, due to the fact that the Church was represented by two Societies on the field. Cassels was eventually consecrated Bishop of Western China on 18 October 1895, in Westminster Abbey. As aforementioned, the CMS worked the western portion, the CIM the eastern portion. But after Cassels's consecration, the work was being more and more co-ordinated under his guidance.

The diocesan newsletter, The Bulletin of the Diocese of Western China, was founded in 1904. It was renamed several times during its 54-year run, with the last print published in 1958.

A Chinese translation of the Book of Common Prayer was published in 1932, revised and authorized for use in the Diocese of Szechwan.

The Diocese was split into Dioceses of East Szechwan and West Szechwan in 1936.

== Bishops and assistant bishops ==
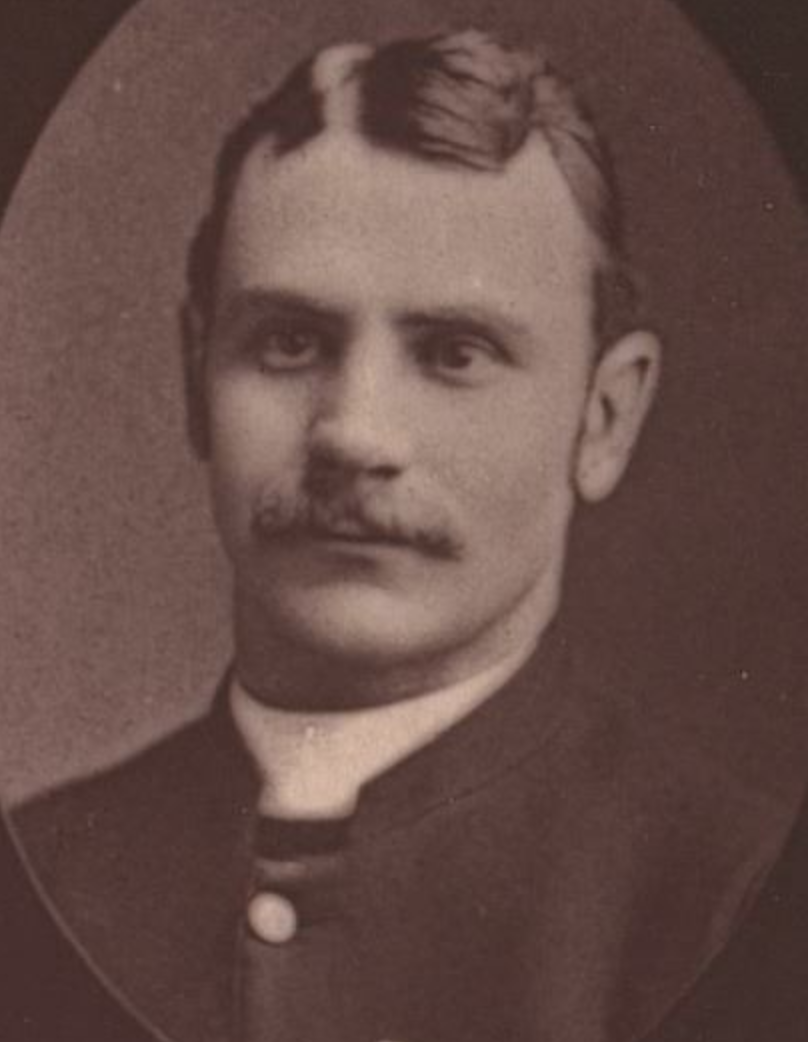
William Cassels, the first Bishop of Western China.

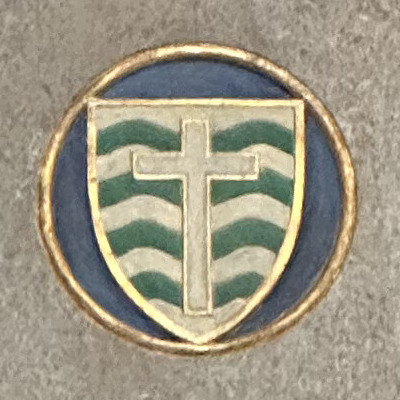
Seal of the Diocese of Western China, as seen on the memorial of John Holden at Truro Cathedral.

=== Western China ===
- 1895–1925: William Cassels
- 1926–1933: Howard Mowll
- 1933–1936: John Holden

==== Assistant bishops ====
- 1922–1926: Howard Mowll
- 1929–1936: Ku Ho-lin
- 1929–1936: Song Cheng-tsi

=== East Szechwan ===
- 1936–1940: Frank Houghton
- 1940–1950: K G Bevan
- 1950–19??: Tsai Fuh-tsu

==== Assistant bishops ====
- 1936–1947: Ku Ho-lin

=== West Szechwan ===
- 1936–1937: John Holden
- 1937–1950: Song Cheng-tsi

==== Assistant bishops ====
- 1936–1937: Song Cheng-tsi
- 1943–1950: H A Maxwell

== See also ==
- Brook Hannah
- Frederick Boreham
- Vyvyan Donnithorne
- Canadian Methodist Mission in Szechwan
- Protestantism in Szechwan
- Roman Catholic dioceses in Szechwan
- Category:Anglican dioceses in China
- Category:Anglican missionaries in Szechwan
- Category:Former Anglican church buildings in Szechwan
