= Holy Light Theological Seminary =

Holy Light Theological Seminary (聖光神學院)
- Motto: If a man therefore purge himself from these, he shall be a vessel unto honour, sanctified, and meet for the master's use, and prepared unto every good work. — 2 Timothy 2:21
- Type: Private, seminary
- Established: In Kaohsiung in 1955
- President: Chen Jisong （陳吉松）
- Location: No. 2, Henan 2nd Road, Xinxing District, Kaohsiung City, Republic of China
- Campus: Urban area (Main campus) Suburban area (Shanlin campus, application pending)
- Nickname: Holy Light

Holy Light Theological Seminary (Chinese: 聖光神學院) is a private theological institution located in Kaohsiung, Taiwan. Its theological education originates from the Kaifeng Bible School established by the Methodist Church in Kaifeng, Henan, China in 1910. Due to the Sino-Japanese War, the school was closed, and re-established in Fengxiang, Shaanxi in February 1941, under the name of "Northwest Bible Institute". Following the China civil war, a group of foreign missionaries and some Methodist brothers arrived in Taiwan, and establishing Holy Light Bible Seminary in Kaohsiung on September 5, 1955. The name was officially changed to "Holy Light Theological Seminary" in 1969.

The seminary offers both doctoral and master programs and is active in international academic exchange.

== School History ==
=== Late Qing Dynasty and Early Republican Period ===
In 1904, the Free Methodist Church of North America officially sent missionaries Rev. C. Floyd Appleton and Rev. Edwin P. Ashcroft to China to preach the gospel.

In 1910, the Kai-Feng Bible School was established in Kaifeng, Henan by the Methodist Church.

In 1920, Hudson Taylor II (grandson of Hudson Taylor, the founder of the China Inland Mission) took over the presidency of the Kai-Feng Bible School. Later the school experienced wars such as the Central Plains War (1930) and the Japanese occupation of Kaifeng (1938).

In March 1940, due to the expulsion of foreign missionaries by the Japanese army, Rev. Hudson Taylor II left with the school's books and supplies and went to Fengxiang, Shaanxi Province in the northwest. Northwest Bible College was established in Fengxiang with the cooperation of the China Inland Mission.

In 1942, Vice President Mark Ma established the "Back to Jerusalem" evangelistic team at the college. With the financial and human resources of the churches in the northwest, the ministry reached the southwest of Xinjiang and the border between Kashmir and Afghanistan.

In 1948, due to the war, the college moved to Sichuan.

In 1951, the college was suspended and all foreign missionaries retreated to Hong Kong.

=== Kaohsiung Period ===
In 1954, the Chinese Methodist Church was established at No. 1, Heping Lane, in front of the Kaohsiung Train Station (now No. 1, Henan 2nd Road, Kaohsiung City). Pastors Hudson Taylor II, Wang Yangwu, and Brother Shi Shengsan convened the first Taiwan Annual Conference.

In 1955, Holy Light Bible College was established at the same address, with Hudson Taylor II as president.

In 1960, Taylor III, son of Taylor II, took over as head of the seminary.

In 1969, with the approval of the United States General Mission and the vote of the Board of Directors, the school was officially renamed "Holy Light Theological Seminary".

In October 1988, an eight-story building plus a full basement was formally opened.

In 1989, the school joined the Asia Theological Association and passed its accreditation.

In 1999, the three degree programs, Bachelor of Divinity, Master of Divinity, and Master of Ministry, passed accreditation by the Asia Theological Association. The school became a full member.

In 2010, the school was registered as the "Holy Light Theological Foundation of the Chinese Methodist Church".

In 2012, a M.Div. program in China was established.

The seminary has produced more than a thousand graduates who are serving in Taiwan, Mainland China, Hong Kong and other regions.

== Campus ==
Kaohsiung Campus (Xinxing District, Kaohsiung City)

In 1953, missionary Mary Geneva Sayre began purchasing land and dormitories near the Kaohsiung Railway and Bus Stations.

In 1966, the school was expanded into a three-story building.

In 1988, the school was renovated into an eight-story modern building, with a total floor space of about 79,000 square feet.

== Presidents ==
The presidents in the school history are as follows

=== Late Qing Dynasty and Early Republic of China ===
Name	Term of Office	Remarks
Rev. C. F. Appleton	1910-1927	Kaifeng Bible School
Taylor II	1927-1940	
Taylor II	1941-1945	Northwest Bible College

=== Kaohsiung Period ===
Term	Name	Term of Office	Remarks
1	Taylor II	1955-1960	Holy Light Bible College
2	Taylor III	1961-1968	
3	William H.Bicksler	1968-1970	Acting President
4	Harry Winslow	1970-1976	Holy Light Theological Seminary
5	Tian Yangwu (田養吾)	1976-1980	
6	Peng Chao (彭超)	1980-1992	
7	Lv Ronghui (呂榮輝)	1992-2000	
8	Chen Jisong (陳吉松)	2000-2008	
9	Zhou Xuexin (周學信)	2008-2011	Seconded
10	Chen Jisong (陳吉松)	2011-2019	
11	Gu Kezhong (谷克中)	2019-2021	
12	Chen Jisong (陳吉松)	2021-	

== Academic programs ==
Holy Light Theological Seminary offers the following programs.

=== Post-graduate programs ===
- Master of Divinity (M.Div.)
- Master of Arts in Biblical Studies (M.A.B.S.)-Day
- Master of Arts in Biblical Studies (M.A.B.S.)-Evening
- Master of Arts in Christian Studies (M.C.S.) -Main Campus: Day
- Master of Arts in Christian Studies (M.C.S.)- Main Campus: Evening
- Doctor of Ministry (D.Min.)

=== Certificate of Completion ===
- Certificate of Believers' Theological Education (informal system)

== Academic Exchange ==
External Alliance

- Asia Theological Association Full Member,
- Taiwan Theological Schools Association
- Taiwan Theological Library Association

Publications from Holy Light Theological Seminary are kept by international libraries.

== See also ==
- Hudson Taylor,
- Hudson Taylor II,
- China Evangelical Seminary
