= Marshall Broomhall =

British missionary

- Born: 17 July 1866; Westbourne Grove, West London, England
- Died: 24 October 1937 (aged 71); Northchurch, Hertfordshire, England
- Resting place: Abney Park Cemetery
- Education: Jesus College, Cambridge
- Occupation: Missionary
- Spouse: Florence Emily Corderoy
- Parents: Benjamin Broomhall (father); Amelia Hudson Broomhall (née Taylor) (mother)
- Relatives: Alfred James Broomhall (nephew)

Marshall B. Broomhall (Chinese: 海恩波; 17 July 1866 – 24 October 1937), was a British Protestant Christian missionary to China with the China Inland Mission. He also authored many books on the subject of Chinese missionary work. He was the most famous son (the fifth of ten children) of the anti-opium trade activist and General Secretary of the CIM Benjamin Broomhall and Amelia Hudson Taylor. Thus he was also the nephew of the founder of the mission, James Hudson Taylor.

== Youth in London ==
In 1875, the Broomhall family, including 9 year old Marshall, moved from Bayswater to Newington Green, London. At Westbourne Grove, where he was born, the family had been members of the Baptist Westbourne Grove Church led by William Garrett Lewis. Marshall's father, Benjamin, then began 20 years of service as the China Inland Mission's general secretary at the London headquarters. In 1887 Marshall went to classical studies at Jesus College, Cambridge. After his graduation (BA) in 1890, he became engaged to Florence Corderoy, the daughter of his father's close friend, John Corderoy. In the same year Marshall was accepted as a missionary by the CIM London Council. His sister Gertrude and his eldest brother had already travelled to China as missionaries.

== Missionary life ==
Marshall Broomhall sailed for China on 2 October 1890 on the S.S. Shannon. He attended a year at the CIM's Chinese Language School at Anqing, Anhui, and then he was appointed to the work in Taiyuan, Shanxi. Three of his siblings (Hudson, Marshall and Edith) had all contracted typhus there, but all three recovered.

== Marriage and family ==
Florence Corderoy followed him to China in 1894, but mission regulations required that they could not marry until both had served for two years on the field. Marshall and Florence were finally married on 17 March 1897. They had two children: Honor Irene and Dorothea Broomhall. Marshall had been transferred to Hongdong, Shanxi in 1896, to work with Dixon Edward Hoste, his brother-in-law, and with Gilbert Ritchie, who later married his sister, Edith. The famous Pastor Hsi (Xi Shengmo) had recently died. The area that Marshall worked in was 40 miles north and south, and 70 miles wide. In 1897 there was a church membership of 490 in 17 villages, with 14 opium refuges. The churches were largely self-supporting, led by an ordained native pastor, three elders, and 17 deacons. Broomhall worked here for three years.

== Further work and the Boxer Crisis ==
Florence's poor health necessitated their leaving for Britain in 1899. In 1900, the Boxer Rebellion broke out in China. The China Inland Mission had the greatest loss of all of the mission agencies; seventy-nine people were massacred, including children. As the tragedy unfolded and news was cabled to London, Marshall spent several days sorting out information gathered from various sources and verifying rumours that were quickly circulating. His work led to the compilation of two memorial books that documented the harrowing stories of both the survivors and the people killed.

== Writing and teaching career ==
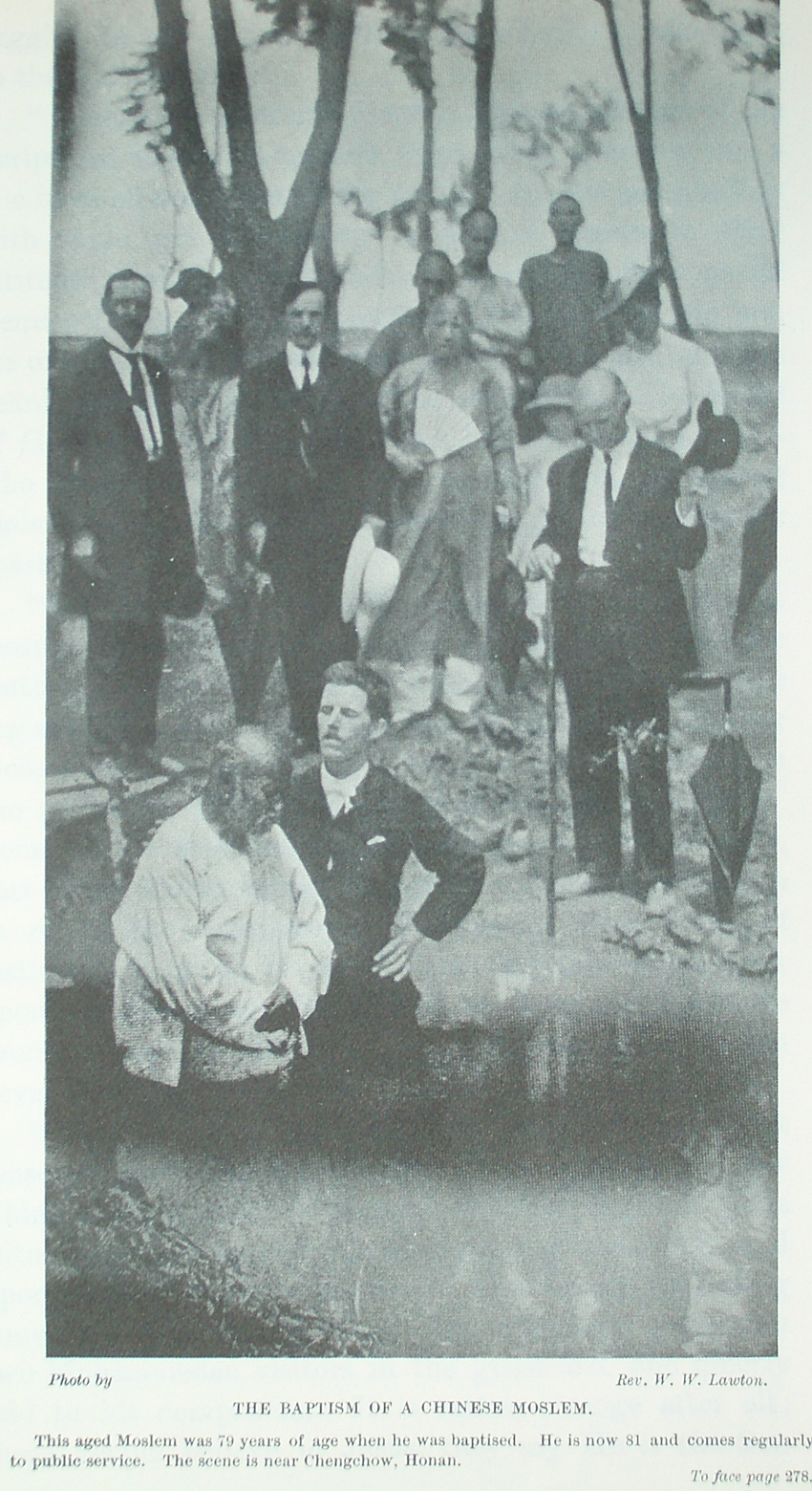
The baptism of a 79-year-old Chinese Muslim near Zhengzhou, Henan, ca. 1908. Photo from Broomhall's Islam in China

That same year Marshall Broomhall had been appointed the Editorial Secretary for the mission in London; this career lasted for 27 years. He also gave preliminary Chinese language lessons to the missionary candidates preparing to go to China.

Marshall started work as a biographer. He wrote biographies of Hudson Taylor as well as several other members of the China Inland Mission. He also wrote several books that addressed overall issues and the history of the CIM. He accomplished much considering his eyesight was impaired at an early age. He did all of his research, writing and editorial work despite being able to see with only one eye.

Marshall took part in the Edinburgh Missionary Conference of 1910. After the 1911/12 founding of the Republic of China he visited China again, and travelled extensively to obtain first-hand and up to date information. He was a member of the commission on "Carrying the Gospel to all the Non-Christian World". In this commission constant reference was made to his important work The Chinese Empire: A General and Missionary Survey, and to the statistics in it.

One of Broomhall's particular interests was the conversion of Chinese Muslims to Christianity. To this end, he authored a book (Islam in China, 1910), which he believed to be the first book in English on Chinese Muslims. He called for sending Arabic-speaking missionaries to China, who in his views could work more effectively among the Muslim community.

In 1927 he retired as Editorial Secretary. But he continued to do his literary work.

In 1936, when the Rev. Frank Houghton returned to China to be Bishop of East China, Marshall took over briefly the editorship of China's Millions. Ill health forced his complete withdrawal from the work.

He died on 24 October 1937, aged 71, at Northchurch, England and was buried on 28 October in Abney Park Cemetery, London. Florence Broomhall lived on until 1957. His daughter Irene went on to become a psychologist and art therapist, and co-founded the Withymead Therapy Centre in England.

== Published works ==
- Broomhall, Marshall (1901), Martyred Missionaries of the China Inland Mission, Morgan & Scott (see: List of the martyred missionaries of the China Inland Mission in 1900).
- ——— (1901), Last Letters and Further Records of Martyred Missionaries of the China Inland Mission.
- ——— (1905), In Memoriam: Hudson Taylor's Legacy.
- ——— (1906). Pioneer Work in Hunan. Morgan & Scott.
- ——— (1907), The Chinese Empire: A General and Missionary Survey, London: Marshall, Morgan & Scott and CIM.
- ——— (1908). Present-day Conditions in China. China Inland Mission.
- ——— (1909), Faith and Facts, as Illustrated in the History of the China Inland Mission, Marshall, Morgan & Scott and CIM.
- ——— (1915), The Jubilee Story of the China Inland Mission.
- ——— (1910), Islam in China: a neglected problem, China Inland Mission
- ——— (1918), Heirs Together of the Grace of Life: Benjamin Broomhall and Amelia Hudson Broomhall.
- ——— (1919), John W. Stevenson, One of Christ's Stalwarts.
- ——— (c. 1920), Selling All to Buy The Field.
- ——— (1921), In Quest of God, the Life Story of Pastors Chang & Chü.
- ——— (1923), F. W. Baller, a Master of the Pencil.
- ——— (1923), Marshal Feng: A Good Soldier of Jesus Christ.
- ——— (1924), Robert Morrison, A Master Builder.
- ——— (1926), WW Cassells, First Bishop in Western China, (one of the Cambridge Seven)
- ——— (1929), Hudson Taylor, the Man Who Believed God (biography).
- ——— (1930), Archibald Orr Ewing, That Faithful and Wise Steward.
- ——— (1931), Hudson Taylor's Legacy.
- ——— (1933), Our Seal: The Witness of the China Inland Mission to the Faithfulness of God.
- ——— (1933), To What Purpose? (biography) of Emil Fischbacher.
- ——— (1934), The Bible in China.
- ——— (1936), By Love Compelled: The Call of the China Inland Mission.

== See also ==
Alfred James Broomhall, nephew and medical missionary
