= Benjamin Broomhall =

British author and missionary (1829–1911)

- Missionary Secretary and Anti-Opium Trade Activist
- Born: 15 August 1829; Bradley, Staffordshire, England
- Died: 29 May 1911 (aged 81); London, England
- Spouse: Amelia Hudson Broomhall (née Taylor)
- Children: Marshall Broomhall
- Parents: Charles Broomhall (father); Jane Broomhall (née Lees) (mother)
- Relatives: Alfred James Broomhall (grandson)

Benjamin Broomhall (15 August 1829 – 29 May 1911) was a British advocate of foreign missions, administrator of the China Inland Mission (CIM), and author. Broomhall served as the general secretary of the CIM from 1878 to 1895. A boyhood friend of James Hudson Taylor (founder and general director of the CIM), he became husband to Taylor’s sister Amelia. As general secretary, Broomhall was involved in fund-raising and recruiting missionaries to send to China and acted as editor of the mission magazine, "China's Millions".

== Life ==
Born in Bradley, Staffordshire, Broomhall was the eldest child of Charles and Jane Broomhall. Broomhall married Amelia Hudson in 1859, and they were members of the Baptist Westbourne Grove Church in Bayswater, London, where they lived. The church was pastored by their friend, William Garrett Lewis, who was instrumental to Hudson Taylor publishing China's Spiritual Need and Claims. The Broomhalls did not go to China, but they sent five of their ten children to China as missionaries, including Marshall Broomhall, the author of many books on China and missionaries; Albert Hudson Broomhall, the treasurer of the CIM in China from 1918 to 1934; and Amelia Gertrude Broomhall, who married Dixon Edward Hoste, recruited by her father as part of the Cambridge Seven.

Broomhall addressed breakfast gatherings in the homes of titled people and spoke for the mission at meetings throughout Britain. When the Cambridge Seven were accepted as missionary candidates, Broomhall organized large farewell gatherings in many centers and produced a book about the men, "A Missionary Band" (1876). A copy was accepted by Queen Victoria, and some 20,000 copies were sold.

For a while, Benjamin was secretary of the Anti-slavery Association, one of many British anti-slavery societies formed during the mid-19th century. His later interest in introducing Christianity into China led to familiarity with Chinese slavery and opium addiction. Long opposed to the former, he also became an active opponent of the opium trade trade, writing two books to promote the banning of opium smoking: “Truth about Opium Smoking” and “The Chinese Opium Smoker”. In 1888 Broomhall formed and became secretary of the Christian Union for the Severance of the British Empire with the Opium Traffic and editor of its periodical, "National Righteousness". He lobbied the British Parliament to stop the opium trade. He and James Laidlaw Maxwell appealed to the London Missionary Conference of 1888 and the Edinburgh Missionary Conference of 1910 to condemn the continuation of the trade. When Broomhall was dying, his son Marshall read to him from The Times the welcome news that an agreement had been signed ensuring the end of the opium trade within two years. Benjamin and Amelia Broomhall were buried in London in the Abney Park Cemetery.

A Flame of Sacred Love by Norman Howard Cliff (1998)

Amelia Hudson Taylor before her marriage to Benjamin Broomhall

Benjamin Broomhall
