= R. L. Hymers Jr. =

American pastor

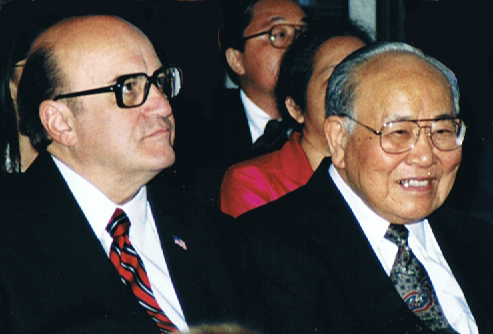
Hymers (left) with his pastor and teacher Timothy Lin

Robert Leslie Hymers Jr. (born 1941) is a conservative Baptist pastor noted for his evangelistic sermons and for his emphasis on classical Protestant conversion. He is the founding pastor of the Baptist Tabernacle of Los Angeles. In the 1980s he drew media attention for his demonstrations against abortion, during which he led prayers for the death of pro-choice Supreme Court Justice William J. Brennan, which he later regretted and retracted, and for demonstrations against the movie, The Last Temptation of Christ. He is the author of several books on conversion, apologetics and theological subjects.

== Biography ==
Hymers was born in 1941 in Glendale, California. He became a Baptist when he was taken to church by neighbors at the age of thirteen. He decided to become a minister in 1958, and was licensed to preach in 1960 at the First Southern Baptist Church of Huntington Park, California. Planning to go to the mission field, he joined the First Chinese Baptist Church of Los Angeles in January 1961, when he was nineteen years old, where he received his early theological training from the pastor, Timothy Lin, Ph.D. (1911–2009). Lin came to the Chinese church from Bob Jones University, where he taught Systematic Theology, Biblical Theology, Old Testament Hebrew, Biblical Aramaic, Classic Arabic, and Peshitta Syriac in the graduate division. On July 3, 1972, Hymers was ordained as a minister by this church, with Dr. Lin presiding. On October 24, 2009, Hymers spoke at Timothy Lin's funeral, held at the First Chinese Baptist Church of Los Angeles.

Hymers graduated from Los Angeles City College in 1968, and from California State University, Los Angeles in 1970. He then attended Golden Gate Baptist Theological Seminary, a Southern Baptist school north of San Francisco, and graduated in 1973 with a Master of Divinity degree (M.Div.). While attending this school, Hymers confronted some of the professors over their rejection of the full authority of the Scriptures. Hymers strongly believes in the complete reliability and inerrancy of the Scriptures. In 1974, he graduated with a Doctor of Religion degree (D.Rel.) from the California Graduate School of Theology. He also attended the San Francisco Theological Seminary, San Anselmo, California (United Presbyterian), where he earned a Doctor of Ministry degree (D.Min.) in 1981. He received a Doctor of Theology degree (Th.D.) at Louisiana Baptist Theological Seminary in 1989. Louisiana Baptist University awarded him an honorary Doctor of Literature degree (Litt.D.) in 2003.

Hymers is the author of a number of books and the sermon manuscripts that appear on his website. He works alongside Dr. Christopher Cagan, who edits and types the transcripts of his books and sermons and supervises the translation of his sermons into forty-five languages for Hymers' site. Hymers has been a member of the Baptist Bible Fellowship since 1985. He celebrated the 50th anniversary of his call to the ministry in 2008. He celebrated the 60th anniversary of his call at the Richard Nixon Presidential Library on April 8, 2018. Hymers' autobiography, "Against All Fears," was published in 2018.

Hymers and his wife, Ileana, are the parents of two sons who are both graduates of the California State University at Northridge. Both of them attend their father's church.

== Churches ==
Hymers served in a number of capacities at First Chinese Baptist Church while attending college at night and working full-time for the Division of Corporations of the State of California. Shortly before graduating from seminary, he founded the interdenominational Church of the Open Door (now Southern Baptist) in Mill Valley, California, in August 1972 with two of his classmates from Golden Gate Baptist Theological Seminary. He later founded an interdenominational church, Maranatha Chapel. In the 1970s this church was renamed The Open Door Community Churches of Los Angeles, with the goal to have a network of 1,000 homes run and occupied by Christians. During this time he emphasized door-to-door and campus evangelism. The church was eventually renamed The Fundamentalist Army, but it disbanded in 1985 amid allegations of infighting and confrontation. Former members of the now-defunct Fundamentalist Army have alleged that Hymers used ethnic slurs and struck them or humiliated them before crowds.

Shortly thereafter, a group of people from that church joined with Hymers to form the Fundamentalist Baptist Tabernacle of Los Angeles, officially named for the church John R. Rice had founded in Dallas, Texas in the 1930s. The name of the church is now the Baptist Tabernacle of Los Angeles. James O. Combs, editor of the Baptist Bible Tribune, wrote the constitution for the new church and spoke at the inauguration service. In 1986, Dr. Ronald Enroth wrote an article for Eternity Magazine that suggested Hymers closely restricted the lives of his congregants, including mandating that all church elders and ministers carry vitamin C on their persons at all times. Enroth, who maintains that other members of evangelical Christian clergy refer to Hymers as "unconventional", and "uncompromising", also pointed to a bulletin insert from Hymers' church: "The reader is told that Christmas and New Year's Eve are Christian holidays, not pagan feast days. 'We expect you to be in church worshiping God. not with lost relatives, worshiping mammon. Those over 18 years of age who miss any of these holy days, will be barred from the Movement.'" In 2008, Dr. Robert L. Sumner, who reviewed Hymers' ministry at the Fundamentalist Baptist Tabernacle in 1988, said "I concluded at the time that all the charges, including abuse and anti-Semitism, were untrue."

== Theological views ==
Hymers is a Reformed evangelistic Baptist pastor and a proponent of evangelistic preaching. Like Charles Spurgeon (1834–1892), he believes that every sermon should point sinners to Christ the Savior. He considers himself to be an "old school" evangelistic preacher in the Puritan tradition and his beliefs about conversion were modified by reading Richard Baxter (1615–1691). Hymers is a Fundamentalist Baptist and claims to have been convinced of this position after reading the works of John R. Rice. He has also stated to believe in premillennialism and Zionism.

Hymers is against extreme views of "King James Onlyism", which he prefers to call "Ruckmanism" after the proponent of this movement, Peter S. Ruckman (1921–2016). Ruckman claimed that the King James Bible is given by inspiration of God and is perfect, and even corrects the Greek text from which it was translated. Hymers disagrees and has written that, though the King James is not perfect or given by inspiration in English, it is the only reliable Bible because it is the only one taken solely from the best texts, the Textus Receptus Greek text of the New Testament, and the Masoretic Hebrew text of the Old Testament. Hymers has been highly critical of Robert Thieme's metaphorical understanding of the blood of Jesus, arguing that it is a part of the end-times apostasy. He has stated that when preaching the gospel, one needs to include both the death of Jesus and the blood of Jesus.

Hymers has written extensively against what he calls "Decisionism" which he believes started about the time of Charles G. Finney, a nineteenth-century evangelist who disavowed the central teachings of the Reformation and made salvation hinge upon the will of the sinner, rather than the grace of God in Christ.

Hymers argued that a denial of the eternal Sonship of Christ is heretical, stating that it is a central doctrine of historic Christianity.

== Demonstrations ==
Hymers became known for a series of provocative anti-abortion demonstrations in the early 1980s. He recounts in his 2000 book, Battle for the Bible in the 21st Century, that he became deeply concerned about the millions of abortions in America during a discussion with Francis A. Schaeffer, a leading theologian, on January 20, 1981, in Schaeffer's living room, as they watched Ronald Reagan's inauguration. According to Hymers, Schaeffer blamed abortion on the Supreme Court's 1973 Roe v. Wade decision. Five years later, on June 1, 1986, Hymers called on his parishioners to pray for God to remove Supreme Court Justice William J. Brennan from his seat on the court by death. On the same day, his church, the Baptist Tabernacle, chartered a plane that trailed a banner reading "Pray for Death: Baby killer Brennan". This resulted in the Los Angeles Times referring to him as a "Death-Prayer Pastor". Hymers later apologized for this prayer and said, "I wish I had not done that and I would never do it again." However, he maintains a strong commitment to the anti-abortion movement, and continues to write against abortion, which he has compared to Hitler's Holocaust.

Hymers' other most well known demonstrations occurred after he read The Last Temptation of Christ, the book upon which the controversial movie was based; he felt that the film would be an attack on orthodox Christian belief concerning Christ. Hymers led two demonstrations against the movie: The first included about 200 of his followers, and occurred at Universal Studios; it featured a small plane overhead that carried a banner proclaiming, "Wasserman Fans Jew-Hatred W/Temptation". The second protest occurred in front of the home of Lew Wasserman, the head of Universal, and featured a passion play in which a blood-soaked Jesus knelt down under the weight of a large cross; another actor played "Wasserman", and stepped on him repeatedly, holding the Christ-figure down with his foot. Meanwhile, another plane appeared overhead, trailing the same banner about Wasserman, while the crowd chanted about the film being "bankrolled by Jewish money". Hymers told the Los Angeles Herald-Examiner that the "chant" was spontaneous, started by someone else and unplanned.

These demonstrations caused an outcry from the Jewish community; several evangelicals and other members of the Christian clergy called Hymers an "anti-Semite". Jonathan Rauch later referred to Hymers as a "religious zealot" for saying "I think the movie is filthy! I think it is ugly! I think it is going to bring God's fiery judgment upon America." Irv Rubin, who was at the time the national chairman of the Jewish Defense League, maintained that he "sympathized" with the concerns of evangelicals, "but Hymers wants to make a Jew-hating thing out of it". The entire episode led to a break between Hymers and Moishe Rosen of Jews for Jesus—who had actually performed Hymers' wedding ceremony. They were later reconciled, and Hymers and his family had lunch with Rosen at his San Francisco home in 2009. Hymers and his wife attended Rosen's funeral the following year.

Following these events, Hymers apologized to the Jewish community. Unfortunately, one of his attempts to build bridges ended with Irv Rubin stalking out of Hymers' church, and Rubin and Hymers each referring to the other as “crazy". Hymers has repeatedly stated that he takes the side of Jews and the state of Israel. He claims he is not anti-Semitic. He maintains that he takes the Scofield Study Bible's view that the "Abrahamic Covenant" grants favor to the Jews and, thus, to the state of Israel. Hymers also claims that he has never used anti-Jewish slurs in his life. One of Hymers' ministers at Open Door Community Churches, a former member of Hymers' Board of Elders while a seminary student—who left ODCC in 1981—recalls Hymers using the word kike "many times".

In 1992, The Jerusalem Post reported that Hymers had apologized for the mistakes he made during the demonstration against The Last Temptation of Christ. Hymers said, "I made a terrible mistake. What I did was wrong and I apologize for it." Hymers had become a member of "The Committee of Concerned Christians", a group that sought to bring better relations between Christians and Jews. The leader of the organization, Ben Friedman, said, "Hymers has become my right hand man." That same year Hymers, along with 200 Christian clergy, pledged to give at least one sermon a year in support of Israel and the Jews, and against the Holocaust. Hymers said, "We have a moral obligation to make sure it never happens again."

== Publications ==
Year	Title	Notes	Publisher
1976	UFOs and Bible Prophecy	Reprinted in 1977 as Encounters of the Fourth Kind	Bible Voice
1977	The Deliverance Book	with Kent Philpott	Bible Voice
1978	Holocaust II		Bible Voice
1990	Inside the Southern Baptist Convention		Self-published
1998	Ruckmanism Exposed		Self-published
1999	Preaching to a Dying Nation	with C. L. Cagan	Self-published
2000	Battle for the Bible in the 21st Century		Hearthstone Publishing, Ltd.
2000	The Great Falling Away plus Old-Time Pastoral Counselling		Self-published
2001	Today's Apostasy: How Decisionism is Destroying Our Churches	second edition, 2001; with C. L. Cagan	Hearthstone Publishing, Ltd.
2001	The Church That Will Be Left Behind		Hearthstone Publishing, Ltd.
2002	A Puritan Speaks to Our Dying Nation	adaptation to modern English of A Treatise on Conversion by Richard Baxter	Hearthstone Publishing, Ltd.
2002	Demons in the Smoke of the World Trade Center	with John S. Waldrip	Hearthstone Publishing, Ltd.
2003	The Anxious Inquirer After Salvation Directed and Encouraged	adaptation to modern English of a book of the same title by John Angell James	Self-published
2004	The Passion of Christ		Hearthstone Publishing, Ltd.
2006	From Darwin to Design	with C. L. Cagan	Whitaker House
2018	Against All Fears		Self-published
