= Hudson Taylor IV =

Great-great grandson of Hudson Taylor

Hudson Taylor IV (simplified Chinese: 戴继宗; traditional Chinese: 戴繼宗; pinyin: Dài Jìzōng), full name James Hudson Taylor IV, is the great-great grandson of Hudson Taylor, the founder of the China Inland Mission (now known as the OMF International). His father was James Hudson Taylor III, who founded the China Evangelical Seminary in Taiwan. And he himself is the present OMF International chairman and president of the China Evangelical Seminary.

== Biography ==
Hudson Taylor IV was born in Taiwan and received his elementary school education in Kaohsiung and Taipei. He completed his secondary school course at Morrison Christian Academy and later attended Seattle Pacific University and Asbury Seminary in the United States. He served for five years at the Chinese Bible Church of Greater Boston, and at OMF Campus Evangelical Fellowship in Taiwan for three years.

In 1993, Pastor Hudson Taylor IV married Taiwanese Ke Yeh–min, Mimi, a girl he met at the Chinese Bible Church of Greater Boston where he was serving as an associate pastor. Ke Yeh–min grew up in a Christian family and is the granddaughter of missionary Li Shuiche, who led the indigenous missionary Mother Zhiyuan to convert to Christianity. Li Shuiche's younger sister is Li Bangzhu, the first female pastor in Taiwan. After graduating from the Department of Music at Soochow University, Ke Yeh-min completed a master's degree in voice performance at Boston University. Since then, she has been teaching music at theological institutions and secular schools in Taiwan, and has released three sacred music CDs.

In 1995, with Chinese co-workers, Hudson Taylor IV helped establish the Hong Kong Mandarin Bible Church.

In 1996, Pastor Hudson Taylor IV and his family moved to Hong Kong. He served as the Human Resources Director of the Overseas Missionary Fellowship's Chinese Ministry Department for two years and became the Director of Chinese Ministry in 1998. In 2006, Hudson Taylor IV returned to his alma mater, Asbury, to pursue a D.Min. in Beeson International Leadership. In 2012, he received a doctorate in pastoral studies, with the title of his dissertation being "The Awakening and Outlook of Cross-Cultural Mission in China". In April 2014, he was invited to oversee the Overseas Missionary Fellowship's Chinese church missionary work, promoting leadership development, strengthening churches, and promoting cross-cultural evangelism.

Hudson Taylor IV and Ke Yeh–min have three children: one son (James V, wife Dai Enqi), and two daughters (Selina and Joy), making up nine continuous generations of Christians in the Taylor's family.

On August 1, 2020, Hudson Taylor IV became the eighth president of the China Evangelical Seminary. Since then, his ministry has been focused on two areas: (a) to help the Chinese church to be witnesses to the ends of the earth, and (b) to see the Chinese church able to contribute to the global theological community.

== OMF International ==
OMF International (formerly Overseas Missionary Fellowship, and before 1964 the China Inland Mission) is an international and inter-denominational Evangelical Christian missionary society with an international centre in Singapore. It was founded in Britain by Hudson Taylor on 25 June 1865.

In the early 1950s, following the departure of all of its foreign workers from China mainland, the China Inland Mission redirected its missionaries to other parts of East Asia. And the name was changed to the "Overseas Missionary Fellowship (OMF)" in 1964, and then to the current name in the 1990s. The vision remains unchanged: to proclaim the Gospel to the “un-reached people, un-reached places.” The present OMF International chairman is Hudson Taylor IV.

== China Evangelical Seminary ==
China Evangelical Seminary (CES, Chinese: 中華福音神學院; pinyin: Zhōnghuá Fúyīn Shénxuéyuàn) is a private non-denominational, evangelical seminary in Taiwan. It was established in 1970 by James Hudson Taylor III, the great grandson of Hudson Taylor. CES is the first graduate-level seminary in Taiwan, accepting college graduates. Before moving to Taoyuan City in 2019, its main campus was based in Taipei for the first 49 years. The present president of the seminary is James Hudson Taylor IV (2020–present).

== See also ==
- Hudson Taylor
- Hudson Taylor II
- Hudson Taylor III
- Overseas Missionary Fellowship
- China Evangelical Seminary
