= Timothy Lin =

- 林道亮
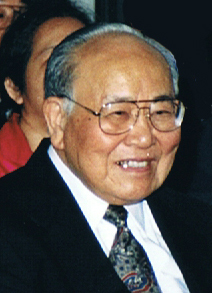
- Timothy Lin in 1994
- Born: 18 January 1911; Zhejiang, China
- Died: 11 October 2009 (aged 98); Monterey Park, California
- Occupations: Old Testament Scholar and Baptist Pastor

Timothy Lin (Chinese: 林道亮; pinyin: Lin Daoliang) (18 January 1911–11 October 2009) was a China-born pastor and Old Testament scholar. He served as senior pastor of the First Chinese Baptist Church of Los Angeles (1962–1980) and as the president of China Evangelical Seminary in Taipei, Taiwan (1980–1990).

== Biography ==
Born in Zhejiang, China on 18 January 1911, Lin was the eldest of nine children of a minister. Though he grew up in a Christian home, he is said to have been born again at the age of 19. He attended Central Theological Seminary of Nanjing, but left in 1934 due to the modernist theology of the time. He then pastored Jubilee Church in Shanghai until 1937, followed by serving as principal of the Christian and Missionary Alliance Bible Institute of Guangxi from 1937 to 1938. During the Sino-Japanese War (1937–1945), Lin managed Bethel Orphanage and was the principal of Bethel High School, then served as dean of Shanghai Bible College. In 1940, he went to Concordia Theological Seminary and Washington University in St. Louis for further studies in Greek and Hebrew. He subsequently served as president of the CIM-affiliated East China Theological College of Hangzhou. In 1948, he returned to the United States for further study, receiving a BD and a STM from Faith Theological Seminary and a Ph.D. in Hebrew and Cognate Language from Dropsie University in 1954.

Lin was taught Theology and Biblical Studies at the graduate school of Bob Jones University and at Trinity Evangelical Divinity School. In 1961, he taught as interim pastor of First Chinese Baptist Church of Los Angeles, becoming its permanent pastor from 1962 until 1994, while also teaching at Talbot School of Theology. He was one of the translators of the Old Testament of the New American Standard Bible.

In 1980 Lin succeeded James Hudson Taylor III as the president of China Evangelical Seminary in Taiwan. He became the seminary's president and professor of Old Testament and Pastoral Ministry, until his retirement in 1990. Upon his retirement, the Timothy Lin Chair of Biblical Interpretation and Church Growth was created at China Evangelical Seminary.

He died in Monterey Park, California, on 11 October 2009.

== Works ==
- Lin, Timothy (1992). The Secret of Church Growth. Los Angeles: First Chinese Baptist Church. ISBN 0945304013.

Selected online articles can be found at:

- Biblical Studies Ministries International
- Shepherd His Sheep
