= William Garrett Lewis =

Baptist preacher

William Garrett Lewis (5 August 1821 – 16 January 1885) was a Baptist preacher and pastor of Westbourne Grove Church in Bayswater, London for 33 years. He was an apologist author of two books, Westbourne Grove Sermons and The Trades and Industrial Occupations of the Bible, published by the Religious Tract Society.

== Early life ==
Lewis was born to Susanna Goldsmith Lewis and William Garrett Lewis Senior, a Baptist minister and writer in Cheltenham, England. He was the eldest of thirteen children.

Lewis worked as an apprentice schoolteacher and a post office clerk before being ordained as a Baptist minister in September 1847; three months later he married Susanna Katterns and they had two children. He served as preacher in London for 33 years. He moved to a church Cornwall in 1881.

== Influence ==
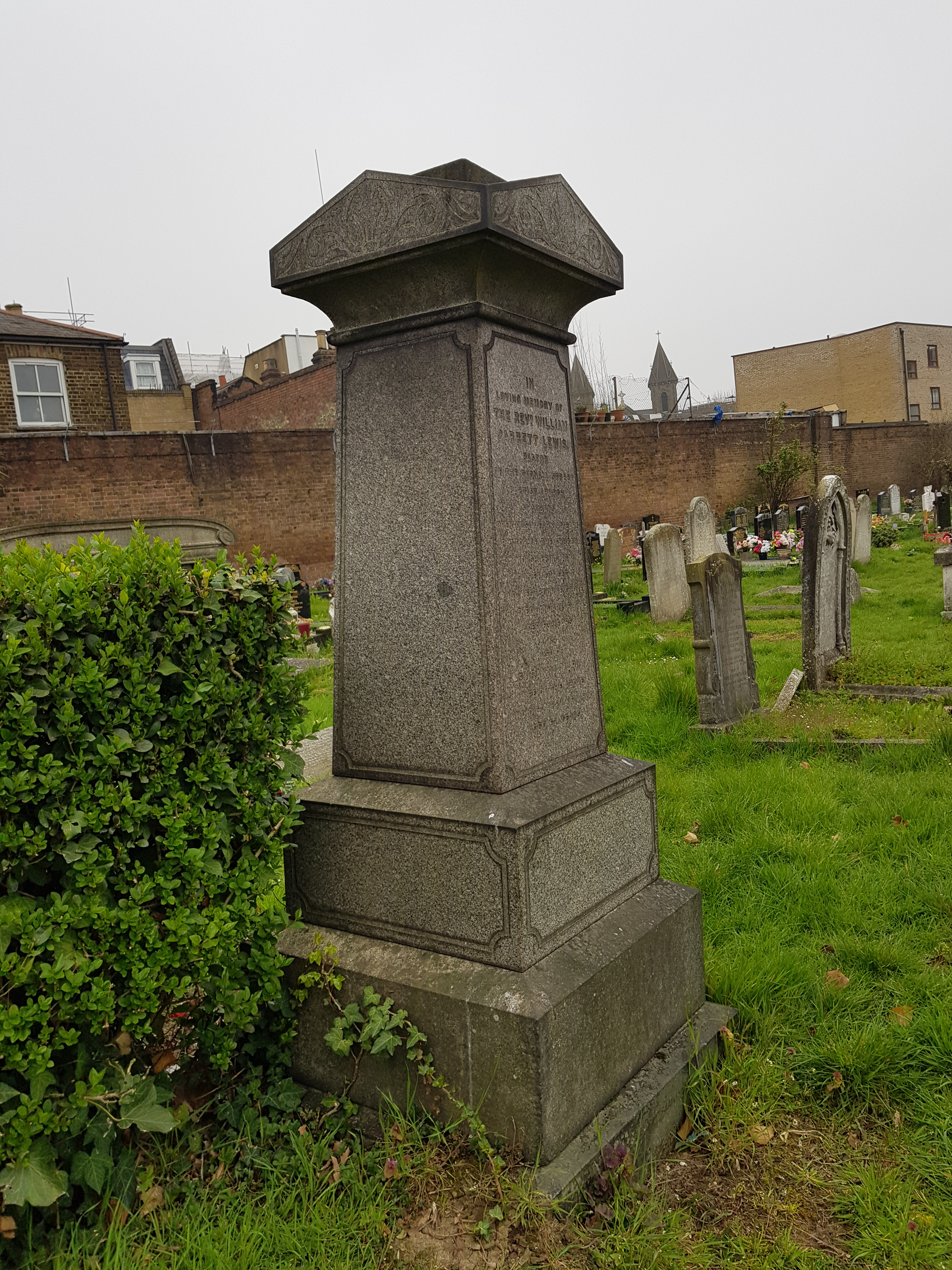
Lewis's grave at Kensal Green Cemetery in 2019

Lewis co-founded the London Baptist Association (within the Baptist Union of Great Britain) along with Charles Haddon Spurgeon and several other pastors. He was instrumental in urging James Hudson Taylor to publish China's Spiritual Need and Claims. His influence on both of these men is noteworthy.

Taylor, who was a member of Lewis' congregation, had lectured about the need for missionary work to be done in China, and as a result of compiling his lecture material into a book form, hundreds of missionaries were inspired to follow him back to China in the 1800s. Lewis was Taylor's pastor during the formative time of the China Inland Mission in 1865, and continued in support of the work, acting as a referee for the agency in 1872.

Lewis was editor of the Baptist Magazine from 1861 to 1881.

Lewis was undoubtedly closely associated with the Anti-Opium Campaign led by another member of his congregation, Benjamin Broomhall, who sought to end British trade in the drug in China. The Broomhall children, too, grew up under the influence of this man, including author and missionary Marshall Broomhall.

Lewis, speaking at the ceremony of laying the first stone of the new Metropolitan Tabernacle for the Rev. C. H. Spurgeon, which took place on Tuesday 16 August 1859, said the following.

I feel constrained to address my brethren in the ministry also to hear the appeal which God in his providence makes to them, to be faithful, uncompromising, simple, and bold in their declaration of gospel truths.

—William Garrett Lewis

In January 1881, Lewis was appointed to the pastorate of Dagnall Street Baptist Church. He died in 1885, before the building was finished, and the stained-glass window at the rear of the church was dedicated to him.

Lewis died from cancer of the oesophagus; he was buried in Kensal Green cemetery at St Albans.

== Works authored ==
- Westbourne Grove Sermons 1872
- The Trades and Industrial Occupations of the Bible Religious Tract Society 1874
