= Alfred James Broomhall =

British missionary to China (1911–1994)

- Born: 6 December 1911; Yantai (Chefoo), Shandong, Qing China
- Died: 11 May 1994 (aged 82); Pembury, Tunbridge Wells, England
- Other name: Anthony James Broomhall
- Education: Chefoo School; Monkton Combe School; Royal London Hospital
- Occupations: Missionary, physician, historian
- Spouse: Theodora Janet Churchill
- Parents: Benjamin Charles Broomhall (father); Marion Broomhall (née Aldwinckle) (mother)
- Relatives: Benjamin Broomhall (grandfather); Marshall Broomhall (uncle)

Alfred James Broomhall (6 December 1911 – 11 May 1994), also known as Anthony James Broomhall, or A. J. Broomhall, was a British Baptist Christian medical missionary to China, and author and historian of the China Inland Mission (renamed as Overseas Missionary Fellowship in 1964, known today as OMF International based in Singapore).

== Chinese roots ==
"Jim" Broomhall was born in Chefoo (now Yantai), Shandong, China, in 1911, the son of Benjamin Charles Broomhall and his wife Marion, missionaries to China with the Baptist Missionary Society. The Broomhalls were a missionary family, and Jim was the third generation to be involved in such work. His grandfather, Benjamin Broomhall, had been the general secretary of the China Inland Mission for 20 years and had married Amelia, sister of the founder of the agency, James Hudson Taylor. His uncle, Marshall Broomhall was the most famous of Benjamin's sons as a missionary and historian - a professional pattern repeated in Jim's life.

== Commitment to service ==
Broomhall was educated in the city of his birth at the China Inland Mission Boy's Preparatory School (Chefoo School) at Yantai, and later at Monkton Combe School, Bath, England together with his older brother, Paul. When he was nineteen, he read a book about the Yi people (also called Nosu), an isolated people of the Liangshan mountains in China's Sichuan province. Intrigued, he made up his mind to tell them about Jesus. In preparation, like his great-uncle Hudson Taylor before him, he became a medical doctor receiving his training at the Royal London Hospital. After completing his courses, he joined the China Inland Mission (C.I.M.) and sailed for China in 1938.

== Return to China ==
Before he arrived, China was at war with Japan. The Japanese were already in control of much of China and travel in the country was difficult. Undaunted, he and some fellow missionaries went to Hong Kong where they bought station wagons which they then drove through French Indochina and back over the Chinese border to Chongqing, Sichuan. Broomhall decided to stay in China to face the difficult times alongside the Chinese people. During this wartime, he practiced medicine in Sichuan at the mission hospital.

He married Theodora Janet Churchill (born 13 June 1913; died November 2000) in 1942 in China; they had four daughters. The couple began pioneering work among the Nosu tribe in 1943, they traveled among them giving medical aid and making friends. But a Japanese advance forced them to leave, still not having reached his target - the Liangshan mountains. The family had to flee to India for safety.

Although thwarted, he told everyone

"I want to go to Liangshan to make friends, for there are my Yi brothers whom I love and wish to serve."

== Return to the Nosu ==
After the war, Broomhalls returned to China in 1946 and Broomhall went to Nosuland, leaving his wife and two daughters at Luoshan, southwest China, for a while. In the end the Broomhalls spent four more years among the Nosu and established a clinic before the arrival of the Communists. In 1947 he finally arrived at the place he had dedicated his life to serve, a region in southwestern Sichuan where he could minister again to the Yi people. He had traveled the thousand miles from Lanzhou to Liangshan. Supported by British missionaries, Ruth Dix and Joan Wales, he opened a clinic to help the sick and to spread the Gospel at the same time. He was greatly loved by the local people. In order to dispel the misunderstanding and fear the public had for people with leprosy, he invited a leper to live in his house for a year. The two shared a room and ate the same food. The Yi were appalled when he took in a leper. The villagers were so outraged that the leper would endanger him in this way that they wanted to kill him, but his condition improved, although the irreversible damage could not be undone.

Broomhall often traveled far and wide by donkey to treat patients in remote mountain areas for free. He rode a mule along the river banks, treating patients and inviting them to a clinic that he had established. On one occasion he removed a young man's festering arm (it had been damaged in a dynamite explosion) and replaced it with an artificial limb, much to the joy of the boy's family. One summer he rode his mule up into remote mountain villages, tending the sick.

Without even the aid of an x-ray machine, he performed two operations on a girl with a crippling bone disease and gave her a new life. As a medical doctor, Broomhall performed these operation hundreds of times, and became much respected among the local Yi people.

In 1951 the Broomhalls spent several months under house arrest, at the end of which they were expelled from China by the Communists with their four daughters. Many local Yi came to bid farewell to the missionary family.

== New focus ==
Broomhall's investigations as to whether the CIM could undertake medical work in Thailand led to three hospitals being founded there; also a pioneering missionary among the Mangyan people of the island of Mindoro in the Philippines for 11 years from 1953 until he retired.

== Writing career ==
When he retired as a doctor, putting down his surgical knives, he started picking up his pen to record history. He spent over a decade going through the vast range of records regarding Hudson Taylor and the China Inland Mission. Consequently, he wrote a multi-volume biography of Hudson Taylor. Broomhall subsequently held a number of positions in the OMF's national office at Newington Green, London.

== Last visit to China ==
In 1988, although in ill health, he obtained permission to visit the Yi again. He returned to the region in Sichuan where he had first ministered to the Yi people. He left in tears, declaring he wanted to return again in two years. By then he was deaf and paralyzed along one side of his body, but people ran to tell each other that Dr. Broomhall was back. A woman knelt before him with a ring, given to her by her mother.

"You healed my mother. When she was dying, she gave me her ring and said I must give it to you."

During a subsequent return in 1991, he donated US$20,000 worth of medical equipment to the local hospital.

""The people of Liangshan have been such a support and help to me," he said. "I will never forget their friendship."

Knowing he could never return again, the teary-eyed doctor picked up a clod of earth to take home with him.

Broomhall died in 1994 in England at the age of 82. His work lives on in the Christian lives he left behind and in the several books he wrote about the Yi.

== Published works ==
- Strong Tower (1947)
- Strong Man's Prey (Fields for Reaping) (1953)
- Philippine Tribes (1955)
- Time for Action (1965)
- Hudson Taylor & China’s Open Century Volume One: Barbarians at the Gates; Hodder and Stoughton and Overseas Missionary Fellowship, 1982
- Hudson Taylor & China’s Open Century Volume Two: Over the Treaty Wall; Hodder and Stoughton and Overseas Missionary Fellowship, 1982
- Hudson Taylor & China’s Open Century Volume Three: If I Had a Thousand Lives; Hodder and Stoughton and Overseas Missionary Fellowship, 1982
- Hudson Taylor & China’s Open Century Volume Four: Survivors' Pact; Hodder and Stoughton and Overseas Missionary Fellowship, 1983
- Hudson Taylor & China’s Open Century Volume Five: Refiner’s Fire; Hodder and Stoughton and Overseas Missionary Fellowship, 1984
- Hudson Taylor & China’s Open Century Volume Six: Assault on the Nine; Hodder and Stoughton and Overseas Missionary Fellowship, 1988
- Hudson Taylor & China’s Open Century Volume Seven: It Is Not Death To Die; Hodder and Stoughton and Overseas Missionary Fellowship, 1989
- Barbarians at the Gates (1991)

== See also ==
- Baptist Christianity in Sichuan
