= Dixon Edward Hoste =

British missionary (1861 – 1946)

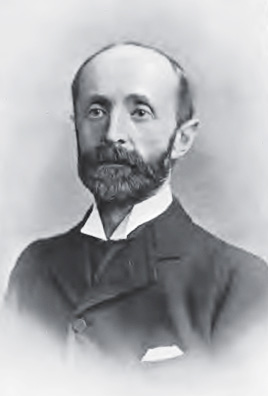
- Missionary to China
- Born: 23 July 1861; England
- Died: 11 May 1946 (aged 84); London, England

Dixon Edward Hoste (23 July 1861 – 11 May 1946) was a British Protestant Christian missionary to China and the longest lived of the Cambridge Seven. He became the successor to James Hudson Taylor as general director of the China Inland Mission from 1902 to 1935.

== Life ==
Hoste was born in 1861 as the son of Major General Dixon Edward Hoste. He was educated at Clifton College and the Royal Military Academy at Woolwich and at age 18 was commissioned as a lieutenant in the Royal Artillery. In 1882 he experienced a Christian conversion under the influence of Dwight L. Moody.

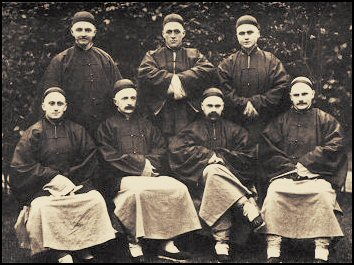
The Cambridge Seven

In 1883 he became interested in the work of the China Inland Mission (CIM) and was the first of the Cambridge Seven to apply to work with this mission. After some delay he was accepted, sailing for China in 1885. He was sent to Küwu (presumably Quwo), to the south of Linfen in southern Shanxi. In 1886 he was ordained as a pastor by Hudson Taylor and moved to Hungtung to work with Stanley P. Smith who had opened an opium refuge there at the invitation of Pastor Hsi. He worked under Hsi, wore Chinese clothes, ate Chinese food, and tried to get an insight into the Chinese mind.

In 1893, he married Gertrude Broomhall, daughter of CIM General Secretary Benjamin Broomhall and his wife Amelia (Taylor's sister). Because of ill-health Hoste visited England in 1896 and then spent some time in Australia before returning to China. He became the general director of the CIM in 1902 and held that role until 1935. During his appointment he was based in Shanghai.

He was interned by the Japanese Army from 1944 to 1945. After the war, he returned to England, where he died in 1946 at the Mildmay Nursing Home. He is buried in Islington Cemetery, London. His wife had died in Shanghai on 12 April 1944.

== Works ==
- 36 Steps to Christian Leadership (1999)
- If I am to Lead (1968)
- The Insight of a Seer: Selections from the Writings of Hudson Taylor's Successor
- Why I Have Joined the Bible Union of China (1921)

== Quote ==
The man who does not learn to wait upon the Lord and have his thoughts moulded by Him will never possess that steady purpose and calm trust, which is essential to the exercise of wise influence upon others, in times of crisis and difficulty.

Religious titles
Preceded by Hudson Taylor	Director of the China Inland Mission; 1901–1935	Succeeded by George W. Gibb
