= Hudson Taylor II =

Hudson Taylor II, full name James Hudson Taylor II (Chinese: 戴永冕; pinyin: Dài Yǒngmiǎn; 1894 — 1978), was a grandson of Hudson Taylor. Born in Scotland, he was the only one of Herbert Hudson Taylor's nine children to become a missionary to China, where he worked for over 50 years, first for the China Inland Mission and later for the American Methodist Church. Together with his wife, Hudson Taylor II founded the Kaifeng Bible School in Henan, the Northwest Bible Institute in Shaanxi, and the Holy Light Theological Seminary in Taiwan.

== Early life ==
James Hudson Taylor II was born in Scotland, UK on 24 February 1894. His father Herbert Hudson Taylor was the eldest son of Hudson Taylor, founder of the China Inland Mission.

At the age of six months old, Taylor II sailed from England to China with his parents. Later, he attended Chefoo School for missionary children, founded by his grandfather and taught by his father. Initially, he was a boy who "read the Bible and prayed but did not believe." But one day, inspired by the Holy Spirit, he accepted the Lord Jesus, repented of his sins, and transformed into a diligent and motivated student.

After graduation from Chefoo School, Taylor II went to Shanghai to study pharmacy. In 1917, upon completing his studies, he went to the Gospel Hospital founded by the China Inland Mission in Kaifeng, Henan Province, engaging in medical missionary work as a pharmacist.

Later, Taylor II went to the United States and attended George Washington University. In 1924, he married Alice E. Hayes, became an American citizen, and joined the American Methodist Church.

After graduating from university, Taylor II pastored churches in the United States for over two years. In 1926, he accepted a commission from the Methodist Mission and returned to Henan, China with his wife. They worked in Luoyang and Kaifeng.

== Kaifeng Bible School ==
In 1927, Taylor II founded the Free Methodist Kaifeng Bible School in Kaifeng, Henan, and served as its principal. During this time, his children Alice, James, Jeannie, and Kathleen, were born.

After the outbreak of the Sino-Japanese War, Kaifeng fell into the hands of the Japanese in June 1938. The family bought ship tickets to go back to the US. However, after prayer, they decided to stay with the Chinese people. In 1939, the couple left their children at the Chefoo Schools in Yantai and went to Shaanxi to preach the Gospel.

== Northwest Bible Institute ==
In February 1941, Taylor II, in collaboration with the China Inland Mission and local churches, founded the Northwest Bible Institute in Fengxiang, Shaangxi, where he served as president. The first class enrolled over 40 students, and totally trained more than 200 workers. The campus covers an area of more than 30 acres, with a church that could accommodate more than 500 people. Most of the faculty at the time were former students of Kaifeng Bible School.

In December 1941, the Pacific War broke out. Teachers and students from Chefoo Schools in Yantai were imprisoned in a Japanese concentration camp. Far away in the northwest China, Taylor II and his wife lost contact with their four children, until after Japan's surrender in August 1945.

In 1948, the Institute ceased operations due to the China civil war.

== Holy Light Seminary ==
In 1953, Taylor II and his family moved to Taiwan. In September 1955, he founded the Holy Light Bible College in Kaohsiung and served as its president. His son, Taylor III, also arrived in Taiwan from the United States that same year and became a young teacher at the school. In 1967, Holy Light Bible College was upgraded to a seminary. Holy Light Seminary has trained more than a thousand pastor graduates who are serving in Taiwan, mainland China, Hong Kong, and other regions. In addition, Taylor II and his wife also participated in the founding of dozens of churches.

In 1967, at the age of 74, after working in China for over 50 years, Taylor II officially retired and returned to the United States. His ministry in China was continued by his son Hudson Taylor III.

After returning to the United States, Taylor II continued preaching and writing spiritual publications. He died on May 11, 1978, at the age of 84.

== See also ==
- Hudson Taylor,
- Herbert Hudson Taylor
- Hudson Taylor III,
- Hudson Taylor IV,
- Overseas Missionary Fellowship
