= China Evangelical Seminary =

Seminary in Taiwan

- 中華福音神學院
- Type: private
- Established: 1970
- Religious affiliation: Evangelical, Non-denominational
- President: James Hudson Taylor IV
- Location: 101 Ting Chou Road, Sec 3, Taipei, Taiwan ROC; 25.017316°N 121.52973°E
- Campus: Taipei and Kaoshuing
- Website: http://www.ces.org.tw
- Location within Taipei Location within Taiwan

China Evangelical Seminary (Chinese: 中華福音神學院; pinyin: Zhōnghuá Fúyīn Shénxué yuàn or abbreviated as Chinese: 華神; pinyin: Huá Shén) is a private non-denominational, evangelical seminary. Before moving to Taoyuan City in 2019 Fall semester, its main campus was based in Taipei, Taiwan (Republic of China) for the first 49 years.

== History ==
China Evangelical Seminary was established in 1970 by James Hudson Taylor III. As founding president, Taylor saw the seminary as an institution to train university graduates in theological education.

In 1979, upon receiving an invitation to serve as general director of Overseas Missionary Fellowship, Taylor recommended to the seminary board to appoint a Chinese to lead the seminary. From 1980 to 1990, the seminary president was Timothy Lin, who also taught Old Testament and Pastoral Ministry.

In 1986, an extension campus was established in the Los Angeles suburb of Monterey Park, which is now known as the China Evangelical Seminary North America. This extension became independent in 2011.

Founded in response to the increased evangelistic work of Christian college students throughout Taiwan, the Seminary has undergone significant growth since its establishment. Forty years after its founding, there are more than 2,000 alumni of China Evangelical Seminary engaged in mission and pastoral work across the world.

== Academics ==
=== Degrees offered and accreditation ===
The seminary is accredited by the Asia Theological Association and currently offers the following degrees:

- Certificate in Christian Studies
- Master of Arts in Intercultural Studies (MA)
- Master of Arts in Marketplace Ministries
- Master of Arts in Religion
- Master of Christian Studies (MCS)
- Master of Divinity/Pastoral Counseling Track (M.Div.)
- Master of Divinity/Pastoral Ministry Track
- Master of Divinity/Theology Track
- Master of Ministry in Lutheran Theology & Church Planting (M.Min.)
- Master of Theology (Th.M.)
- Doctor of Intercultural Studies
- Doctor of Ministry (D.Min.)

== Leadership ==
- James Hudson Taylor III (1970–1980)
- Timothy Lin (1980–1990)
- Caleb T.C. Huang (1990–1998)
- Che-Bin Tan (1998-2004)
- Chien-Kuo Lai (2004-2010)
- Peter K. Chow (2011-2014)
- Lee-Chen Anne Tsai (2015–2020)
- James Hudson Taylor IV (2020–present)

== Faculty ==
In its early years the faculty at China Evangelical Seminary was supported by faculty from the Chinese Theological Institute of Hong Kong and the Baptist Theological Seminary of Taiwan. Today, the Seminary has thirteen full-time faculty, over twenty part-time instructors, and five faculty members who are undergoing further studies.

Current and past resident faculty members include:

- Andrew W. Butler
- George Sheng-Chia Chang
- Kline Kai-Hsuan Chang
- Robert Tsai-Chin Chang
- Hui-Shiang Chao
- Jonathan Tien-En Chao
- Ling Cheng
- Ju-Ping Chiao
- Samuel H.H. Chiow
- Winston Hsien-Cheng Chiu
- Peter K. Chow
- Lily K. Chua
- Shirley S. Ho
- Na-Min Hsieh
- Wesley Wei-Hua Hu
- Caleb T.C. Huang
- Jen-Zen Huang
- Archie Wang-Do Hui
- Nam-Seng Koh
- Paul Kong
- I-Chun Kuo
- Chien-Kuo Lai
- Alicia C. Lee
- Paul Chien-Ju Lee
- William Y.W. Liao
- Timothy Lin
- Joshua Chia-En Liu
- Joshua Y.K. Mak
- Paul Sung Noh
- Che-Bin Tan
- James Hudson Taylor III
- Anne Lee-Chen Tsai
- Alex Shao-Kai Tseng
- Daniel Wei-Wen Tu
- Cecil K.H. Wang
- Emily Y. Wang
- David Chi-Yuen Wei
- Clement Yung Wen
- John Wing-Hong Wong
- Timothy San-Jarn Wu
- Tsen-Jen Wu

== Awards and prizes ==
Among its student awards, China Evangelical Seminary awards an annual prize for Excellence in Preaching in honor of the acclaimed American theologian and writer Frederick Buechner. Winners of the prize are selected by faculty in recognition of their significant achievements in the area of homiletics. Additionally, the Seminary has regularly distributed copies of Buechner's works among its students.
