= Stanley P. Smith =

British missionary (1861 – 1931)

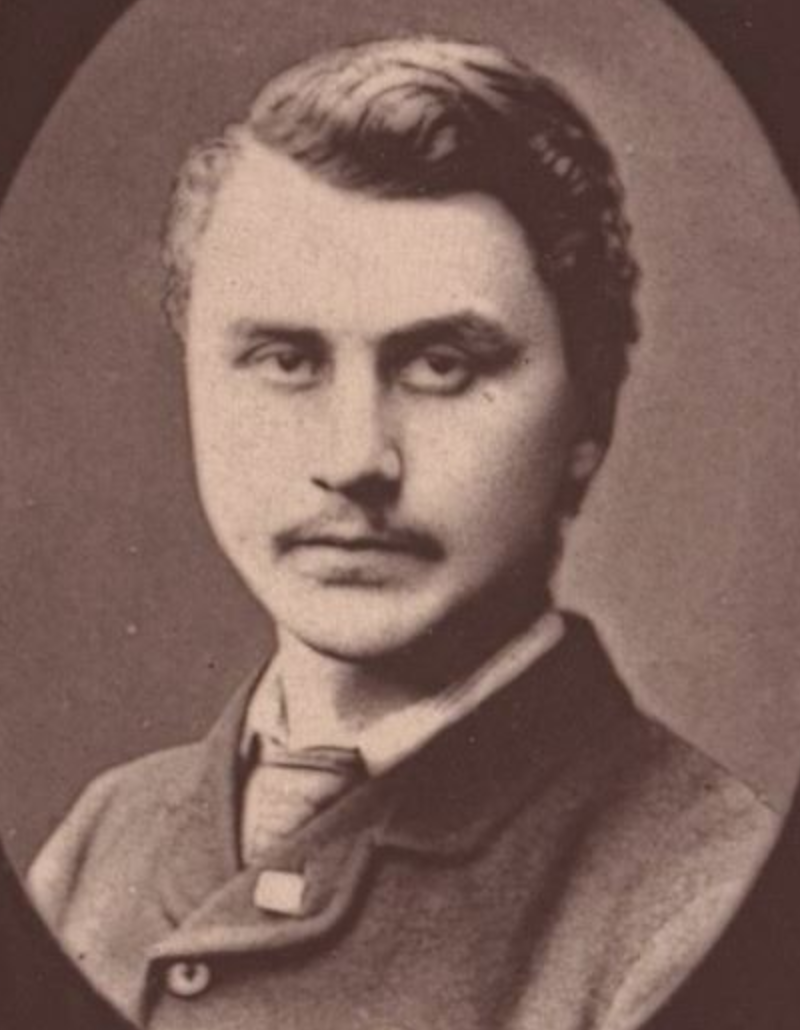
Stanley P. Smith in 1886

Stanley Peregine Smith (19 March 1861 – 31 January 1931) was a British Protestant Christian missionary to China.

== Early life ==
Smith was the son of Henry Smith F.R.C.S., and his wife Alice Underwood, of 13 John Street, Berkeley Square, London. He was educated at Repton and Trinity College, Cambridge. Smith was one of the Cambridge Seven—students from Cambridge University who in 1885 decided to become missionaries to China. He was a Cambridge Blue, having rowed as stroke for Cambridge in the 1882 Boat Race. He was born again in one of Dwight L. Moody's revivals and helped found the Cambridge Christian Union, forerunner of many student Christian organizations. Following his conversion and call to mission, Smith had a soapbox in Hyde Park where he preached "not the milk and water of religion but the cream of the gospel".

== Travel to China ==
Smith, along with Charles Studd of the Cambridge Seven, started his ministry in Shan-Si Province in northern China. He was an excellent linguist and was said to be as fluent in his preaching in Chinese as he was in English. In November 1899 the Smith family sailed from China arriving in Plymouth on 16 December, so they were not in China at the time of the Boxer Rebellion.

== Move to Shanxi ==
Shortly before the First World War Smith left the China Inland Mission after some disagreements on doctrine but continued to have good relationships with the mission. He continued in China and opened his own work in east Shanxi. Although in the latter years he often faced trials and disappointments, he continued with his teaching and preaching (and writing up his diary) until the night before he died, on 31 January 1931 in Tse-Chow.

== Family life ==
Smith married fellow missionary Sophie de Reuter from Norway on 16 September 1888. They had one son, Algernon Stanley Smith, one of the founders of the Ruanda Mission. After Sophie died he married Anna M Lang (born circa 1864) from Scotland. They had three children: Henry (born 1895); Mary (born 1898); and Robert (born 1901).
