= Hudson Taylor =

Protestant missionary to China (1832–1905)

The Reverend James Hudson Taylor
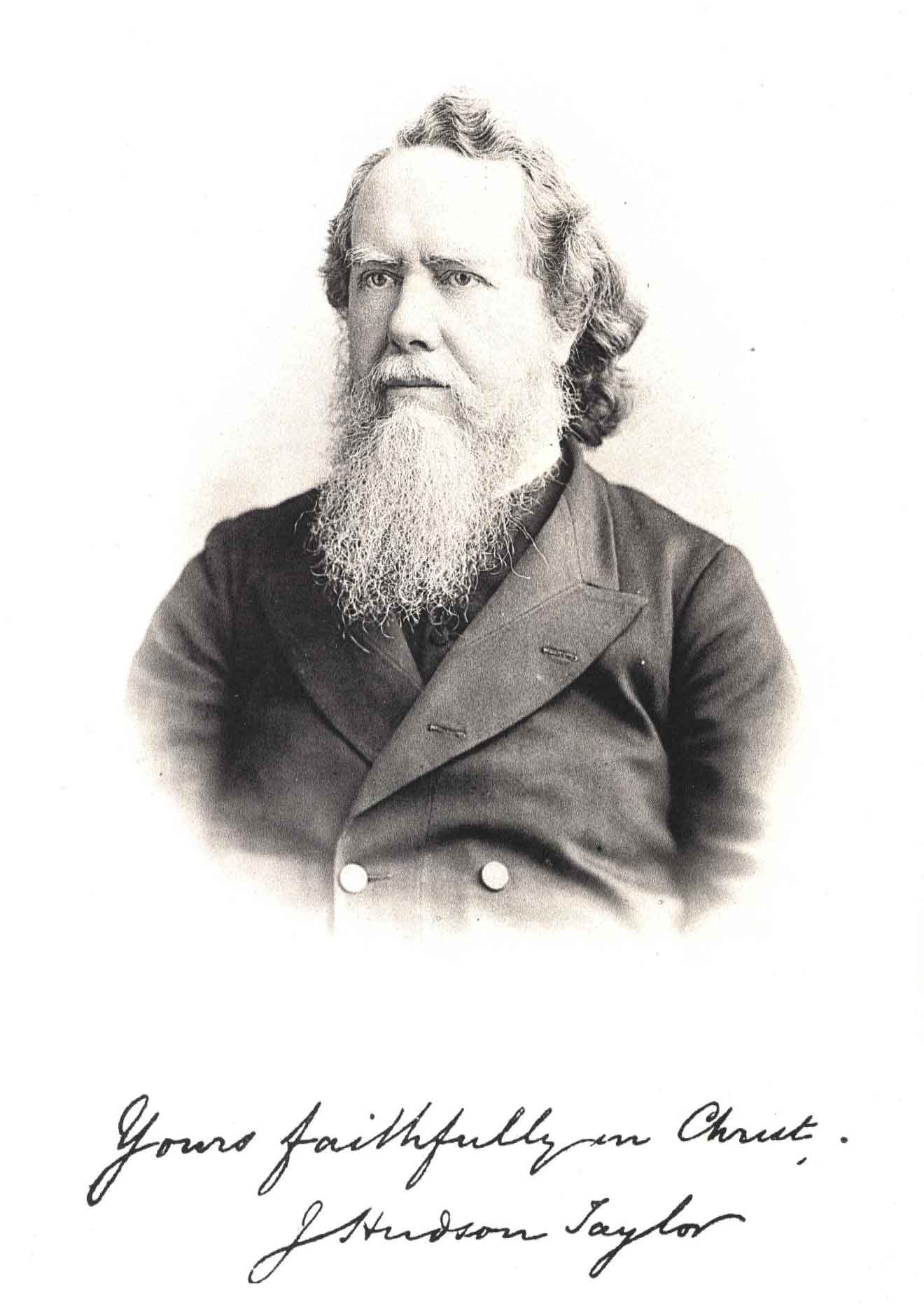
- Taylor in 1893 with a handwritten note and signature

Personal life
- Born: 21 May 1832 Barnsley, Yorkshire, England
- Died: 3 June 1905 (aged 73) Changsha, Hunan, China
- Spouse: Maria Jane Taylor (née Dyer); Jennie Taylor (née Faulding)
- Parent(s): James Taylor; Amelia Hudson
- Education: London Hospital Medical College

Religious life
- Religion: Christianity
- Church: Protestant

James Hudson Taylor (Chinese: 戴德生; pinyin: dài dé shēng; 21 May 1832 – 3 June 1905) is regarded as one of the most "important and influential missionaries of all time." He was a British Protestant Christian missionary to China and founder of the China Inland Mission (CIM, now OMF International). Taylor visited or lived in China over a period of 51 years. The CIM that he founded in 1865 became the largest of many missionary organizations in China. By 1910, it had more than 800 missionaries to the country, created 125 schools, and converted more than 20,000 Chinese to Christianity, as well as establishing more than 300 stations of work with more than 499 local helpers based in all 18 provinces.

Taylor was known for his zeal for evangelism and for mimicking Chinese culture. He adopted wearing native Chinese clothing even though this was very rare among missionaries of that time. Under his leadership, the CIM was singularly non-denominational and accepted members from all Protestant groups, including individuals from the working class and single women as well as multinational recruits. Historian Ruth Tucker summarizes the theme of his life: "No other missionary in the nineteen centuries since the Apostle Paul has had a wider vision and has carried out a more systematized plan of evangelizing a broad geographical area than Hudson Taylor."

Taylor was able to preach in several varieties of Chinese, including Mandarin, Chaozhou, and the Wu dialects of Shanghai and Ningbo. The last of these he knew well enough to help prepare a colloquial edition of the New Testament written in it.

== Youth and early work ==
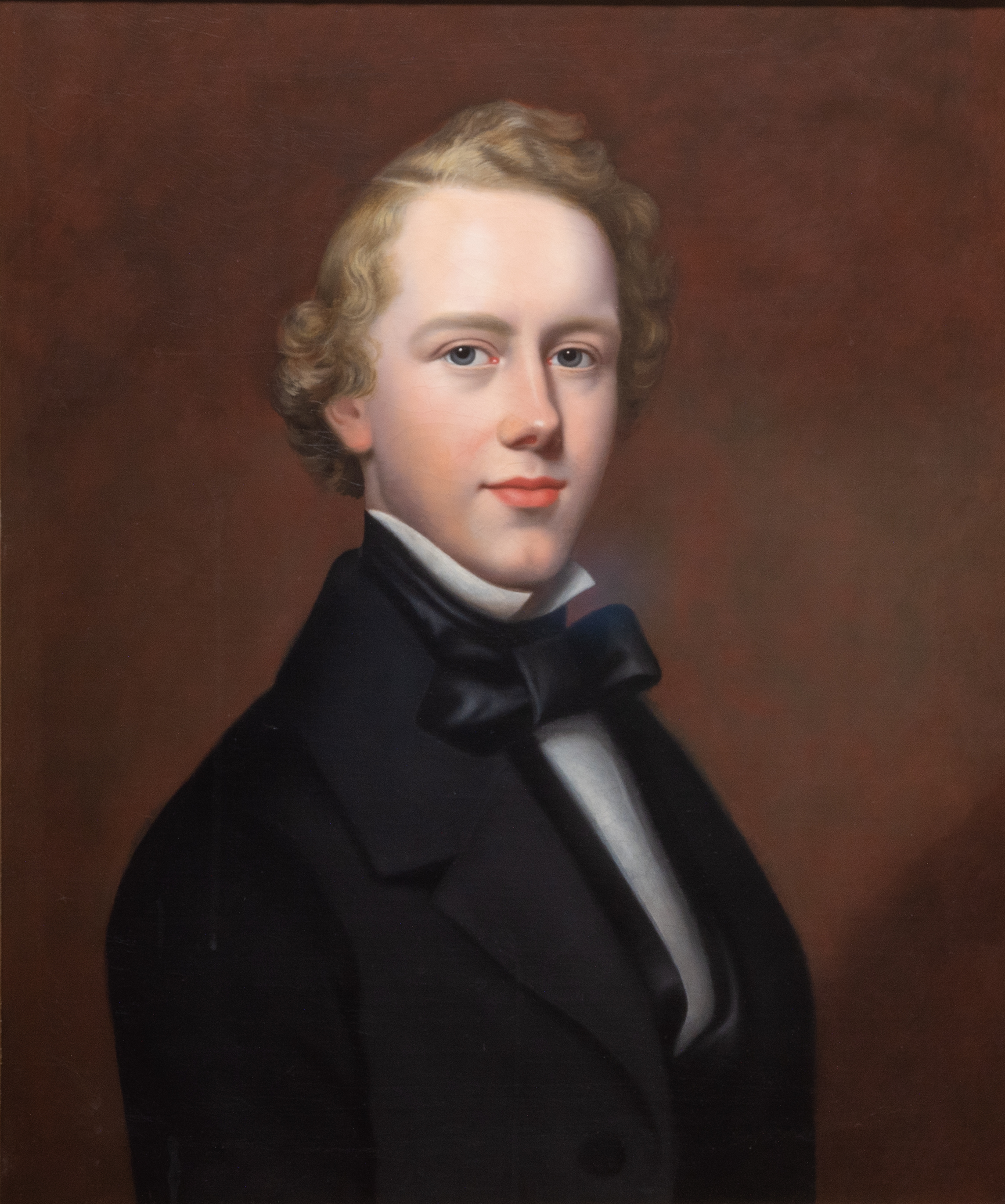
Hudson Taylor at age 21

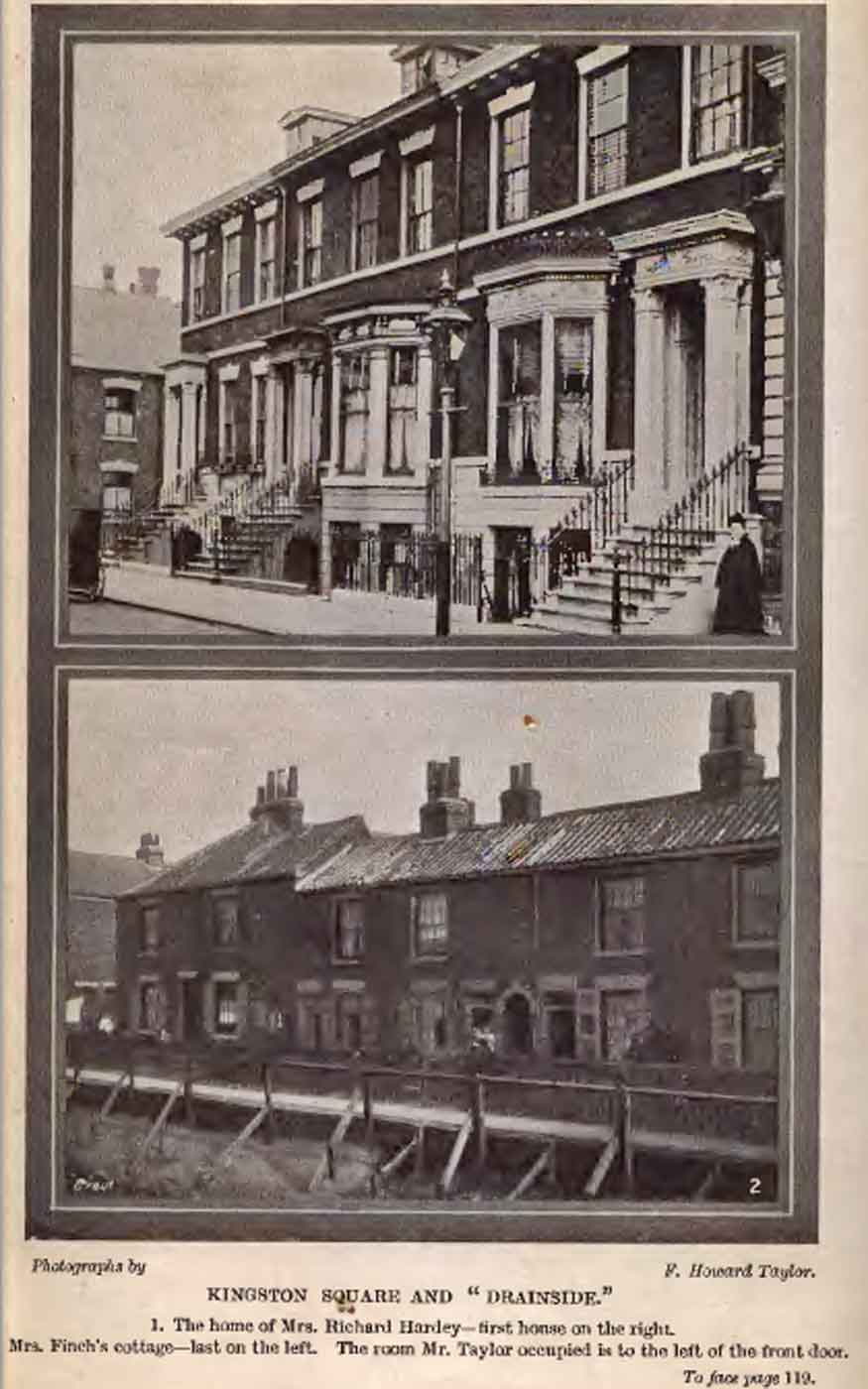
Hudson Taylor worked at Dr. Hardey's, and lodged for a time at his brother's home Mr Richard Hardey, 16 Kingston Square, Hull (top) and then moved and lived in the near-poverty of Drainside

Taylor was born on 21 May 1832 in Barnsley, Yorkshire, the first child of a chemist (pharmacist) and Methodist lay preacher James Taylor and his wife, Amelia Hudson. Hudson Taylor was a small, sickly child. According to legend, James Taylor instilled in his son a desire to evangelize China. As a young man he doubted the Christian beliefs of his parents, but at age 17, he experienced a religious conversion and a year later felt a call from God to become a Christian missionary in China.

In spring 1851, he began working with a medical doctor in Hull. He studied Chinese, Latin, Hebrew, and Greek. In November 1851, he moved into modest dwellings and began denying himself luxuries. He spent his spare time as a medical missionary working with people in the slums. He gave away much of his money to the poor. He fell in love with a Miss Vaughan, a music teacher, but his lifestyle was too austere for her, and she denied his affections. He wrote to the London Missionary Society offering his services but received no reply.

In fall 1852 Taylor began studying medicine at the London Hospital Medical College in Whitechapel, London, as preparation for working in China. The interest awakened in England about China because of the Taiping Rebellion which was then erroneously supposed to be a mass movement toward Christianity, together with the glowing but exaggerated reports made by German missionary Karl Gützlaff concerning China's accessibility, led to the founding of the Chinese Evangelisation Society (CES). Hudson Taylor offered himself as its first missionary. The Society paid for his medical training. He attempted to rekindle his romance with Miss Vaughan, but her family objected to his plans to go to China, and the couple mutually broke off the engagement.

== First visit to China ==
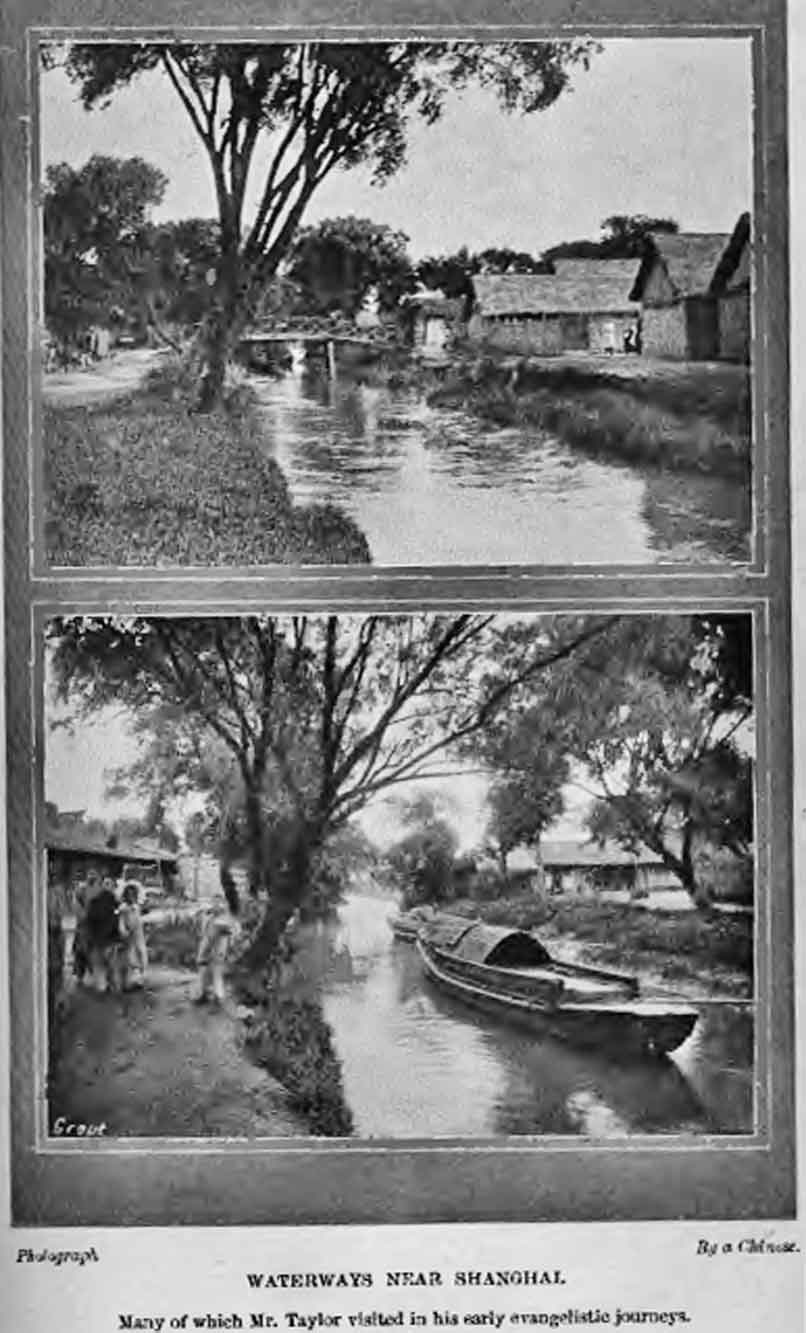
Hudson Taylor travelled by boat around the canals and waterways of China, preaching and distributing Bibles

Taylor left England on 19 September 1853 as an agent of CES without completing his medical studies, and he arrived in Shanghai on 1 March 1854. He was immediately faced with the civil war raging in the vicinity. W.A.P Martin, a veteran missionary, characterized Taylor as "an odd sparrow." He was often destitute as the funds promised him by the CES did not arrive. He dressed as a Chinese, shaved his head, and grew a pigtail, scandalizing the foreign community in Shanghai. Veteran missionary Joseph Edkins took Taylor under his wing and schooled him in Chinese customs. Missionary William Chalmers Burns accompanied him on tours to the countryside. Among his experiences he was robbed twice, losing his medical equipment and personal items. In 1857 he resigned from the CES, along with medical doctor William Parker, and moved to Ningbo as an independent missionary. There he made his first convert to Christianity.

In 1858, Taylor fell in love with Maria Dyer, the orphaned daughter of the Reverend Samuel Dyer of the London Missionary Society. Maria was working in Ningbo at a girls' school run by Mary Ann Aldersey. Aldersey regarded Taylor as a "poor unconnected Nobody!...without education and without position." Nevertheless, the couple were married on 20 January 1858. Taylor adored Maria who was "almost constantly pregnant." The couple had nine children in the 12 years of their marriage of whom four survived to adulthood.

Both Taylors were in poor health, and they returned to England in 1860 along with their daughter, Grace, and a young man, Wang Laijun, who would help with the Bible translation work that would continue in England.

== China Inland Mission ==
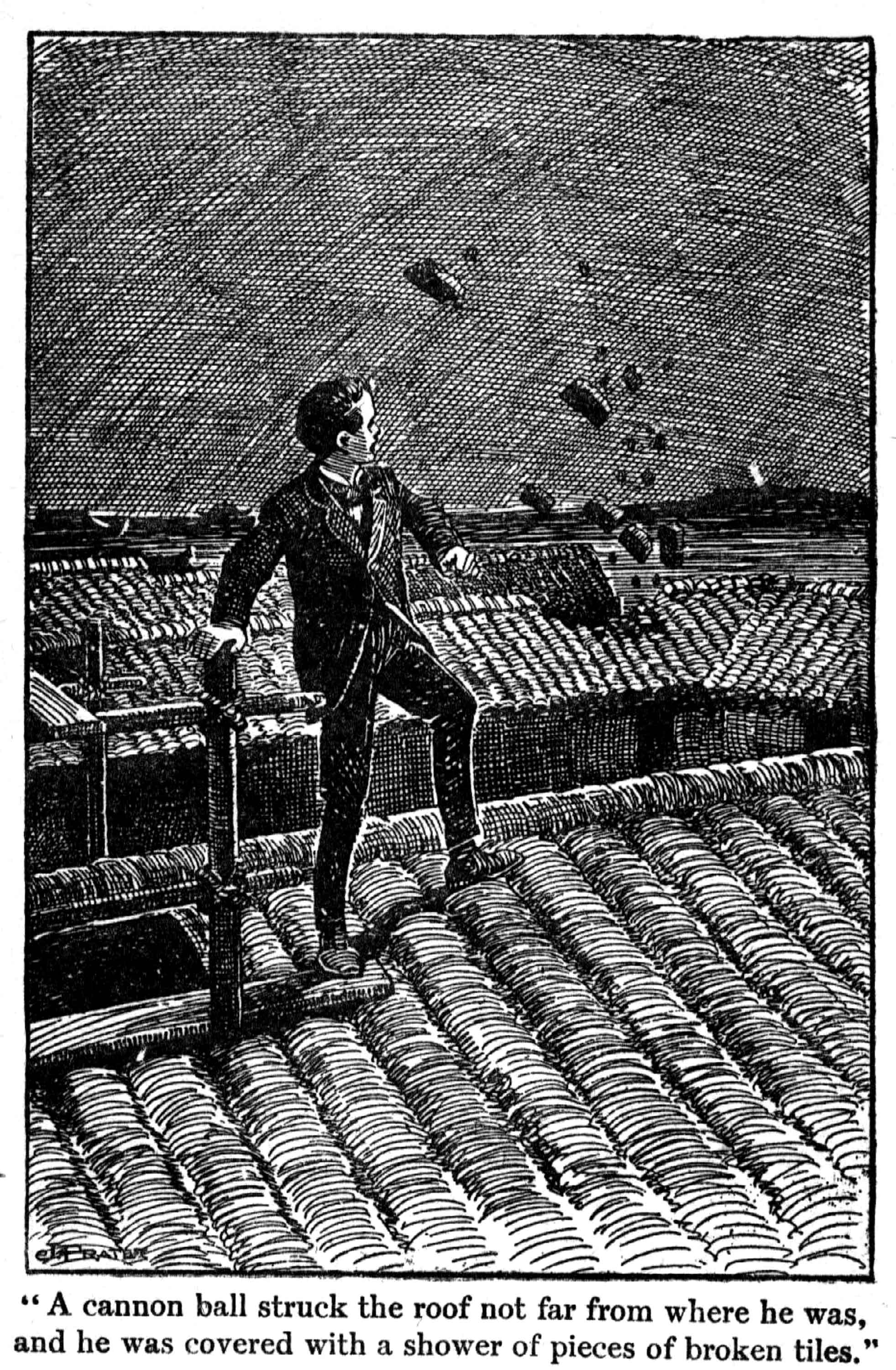
Hudson Taylor was almost killed in Shanghai during the civil war

The Taylors remained in England almost six years. Taylor completed his medical training, was ordained as a minister, and translated the New Testament into the Ningbo dialect of Chinese. He wrote a book titled China's Spiritual Need and Claims. He travelled around Britain speaking at churches and generating support for missionary work in China.

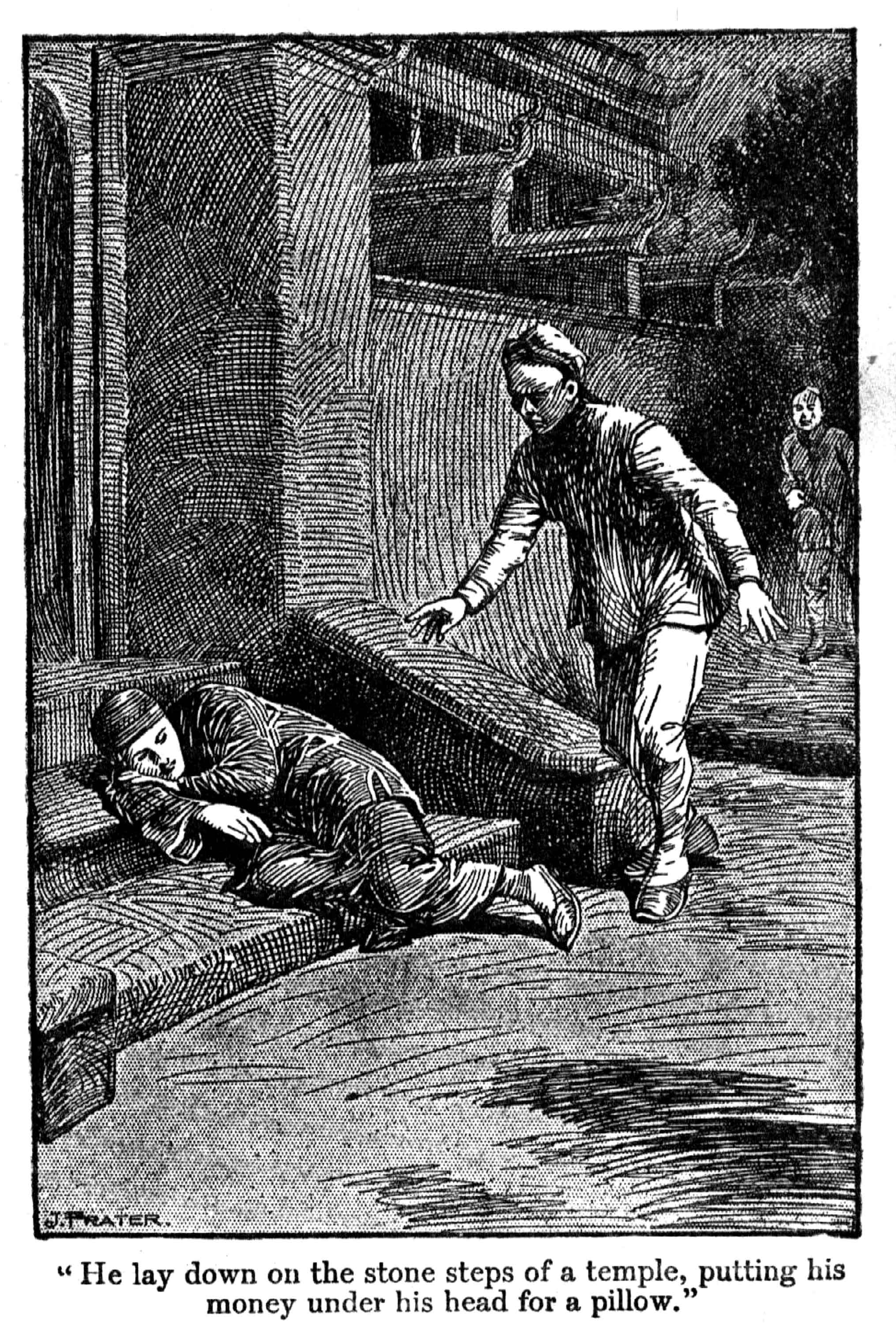
Hudson Taylor alone at night is searched by a thief.

On 25 June 1865 on Brighton beach, Taylor had a "heavenly vision." He dedicated himself to the founding of a missionary society to undertake the evangelization of the "unreached" inland provinces of China. He founded the China Inland Mission (CIM) together with William Thomas Berger shortly thereafter. He opened a bank account for the CIM with 10 pounds of his own money.

Taylor established the core values of the CIM, quite different from those of the dozen or more missionary organizations then operating in China. The organization would not appeal for funds, but "rely on God alone" for sustenance. The focus would be on the inland provinces of China, unreached at that time by Protestant missionaries. CIM missionaries would dress, eat, and live as Chinese to better fulfill their mission. The missionaries would be non-denominational, selected for their beliefs and dedication, not their affiliations and credentials. People of all social classes and levels of education plus single women would be selected as missionaries. Finally, the CIM would be governed from China and headed by a general director (Taylor), not a board or committee in its homeland, unlike other missionary organizations.

== Return to China ==
In late 1865, Taylor sent out the first two missionaries of the CIM. On 26 May 1866, he boarded ship at the head of the "Lammermuir Party." Aboard were Hudson and Maria Taylor, their four children, and 16 missionaries, including nine single women. After a four month voyage (and two typhoons) they arrived in Shanghai on 30 September. They were the largest group of missionaries that had ever arrived in China.

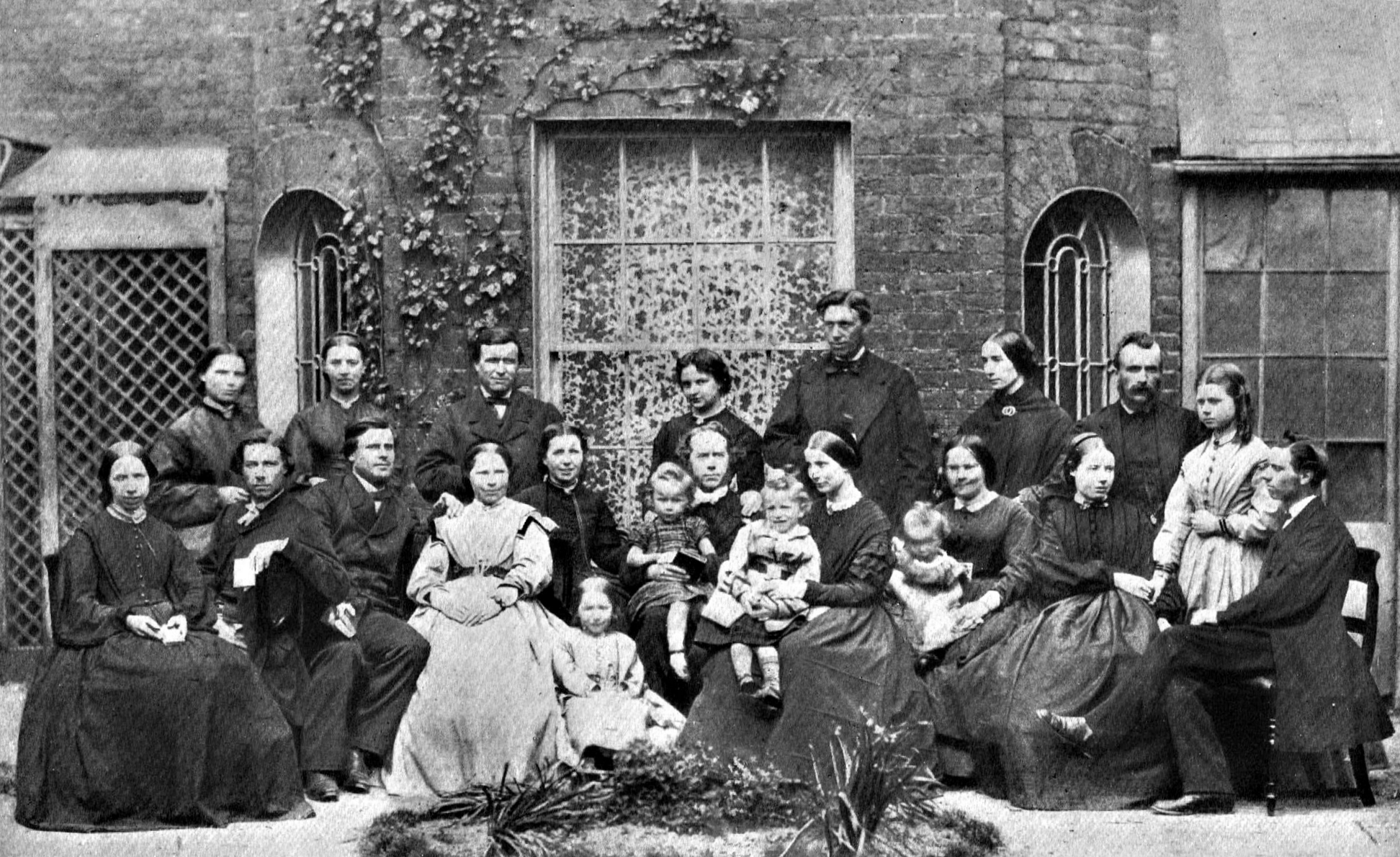
The Lammermuir Party included 16 missionaries and the Taylors' four children.

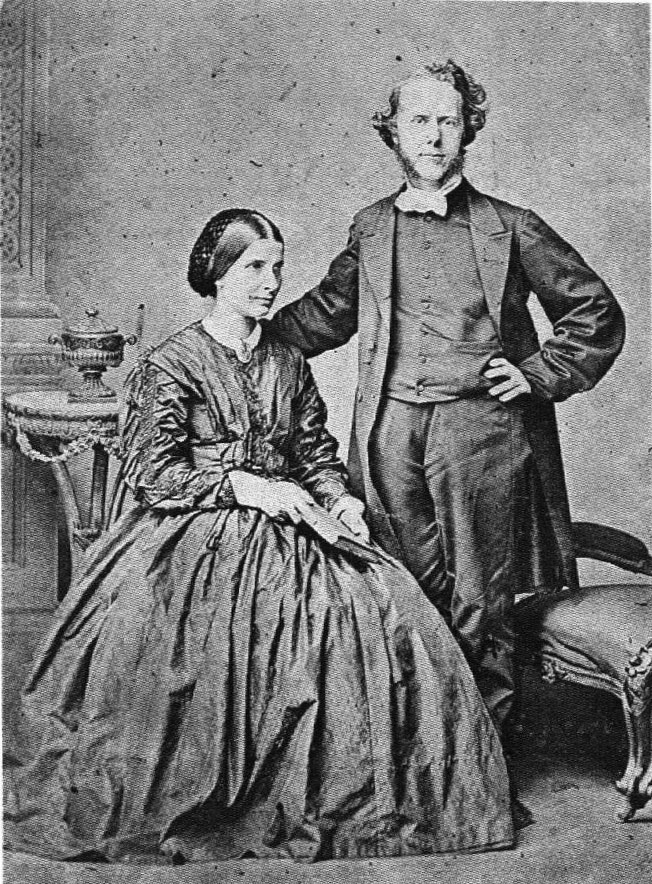
Hudson and his first wife Maria, c. 1860s

Dissension among the missionaries began while on board the ship and continued in China. Taylor stipulated that all the missionaries wear Chinese dress, which included the men shaving their foreheads and wearing a pigtail. The group was called the "Pigtail Tribe" by European residents of Shanghai who found their adoption of Chinese clothing to be ridiculous. Moreover, rumors began to circulate that it was inappropriate for "young unmarried females" to share a home with Taylor. Missionary George Moule advised Taylor to "put a speedy end" to the CIM.

Moreover, in 1868 Taylor and his CIM associates were accused of causing a riot in Yangzhou. The Taylors had taken a party of missionaries to Yangzhou, but their mission premises were attacked, looted, and burned during the Yangzhou riot. The international outrage at the Chinese for the attack on British citizens (and the subsequent arrival of the Royal Navy) caused the CIM and Taylor to be criticized for almost starting a war. Taylor never requested military intervention, but British officials asked "what right have we to send missionaries to the interior of China?"

Personal problems also dogged Taylor. Two of his children died, and he sent one of his missionaries, Emily Blatchley, back to England with his surviving three children. On 23 July 1870, Maria died.

== Problems ==
Two developments in the late 1860s facilitated the missionary enterprise in China. The opening of the Suez Canal in 1869 and the use of the steamship rather than sailing ships reduced travel time from England to China from four months or more to less than two months.

Grief from Maria's death, health problems, and the need to reorganize the home office of CIM caused Taylor to leave China in August 1871 to return to England. Accompanying him on the voyage was CIM missionary Jennie Faulding. The two fell in love and were married on 28 November 1871 in London. In late 1872, the couple returned to China. They had four children, two of whom grew to be adults.

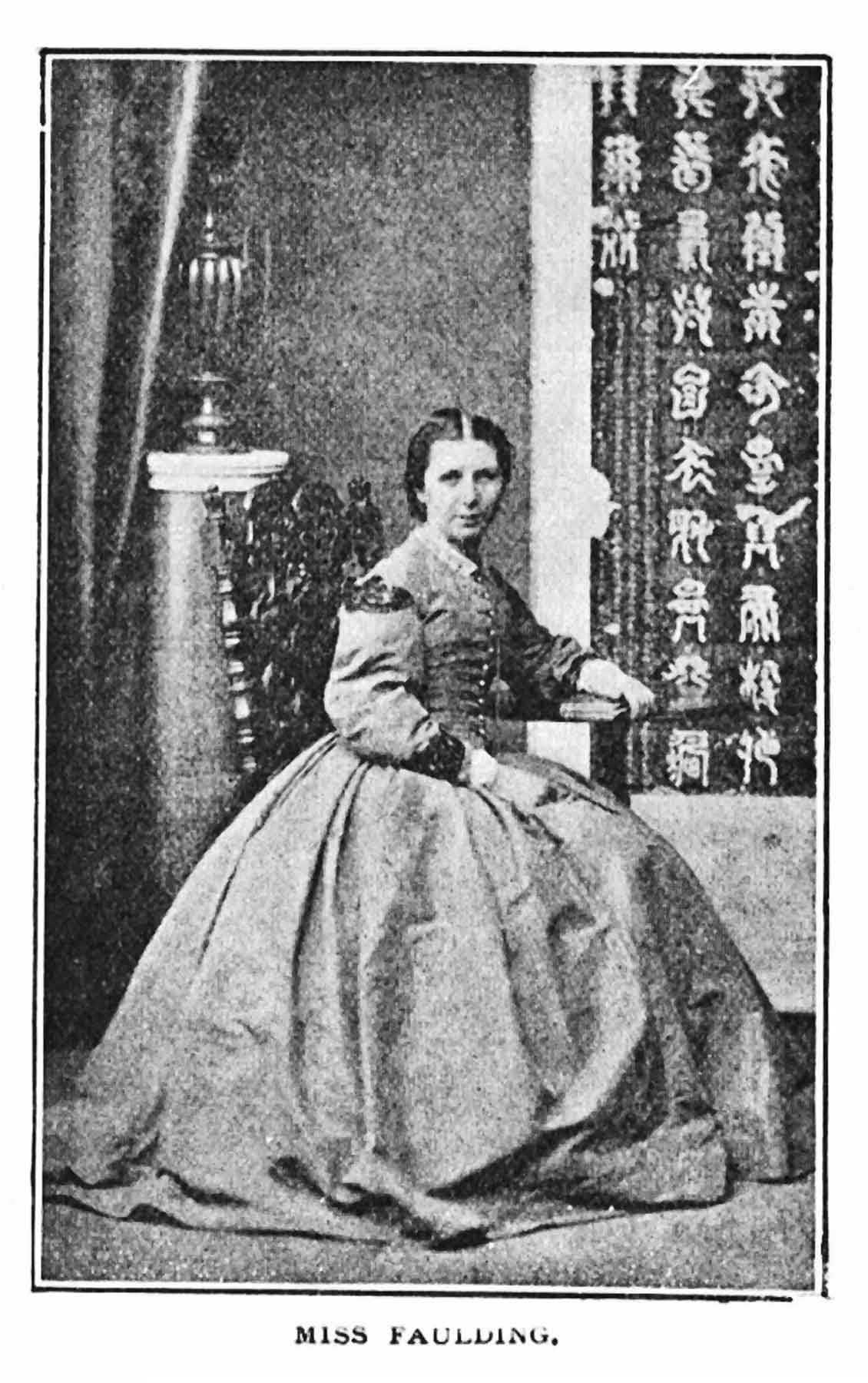
Hudson Taylor married Jennie Faulding in 1871.

In June 1874, Taylor injured his spine and was paralyzed for six months. Jennie and he returned to England. From his bed, he conducted CIM business, wrote articles for CIM publications, and recruited missionaries. In author Austin's view, this was the nadir of the fortunes of the China Inland Mission. Fifty-three missionaries had been sent to China, but only 22 remained. The others had died or resigned. Of the 22, "only four or five men and three or four women were much good."

In his state of crippling physical hindrance, Taylor confidently published an appeal for 18 new workers to join the work. When he did recover his strength, Jennie remained in England with the children, and in 1876 Taylor returned to China, followed by 18 additional missionaries. Meanwhile, in England, the task of General Secretary of the China Inland Mission in England was undertaken by Benjamin Broomhall, who had married Hudson's sister, Amelia.

== CIM strategy ==
Taylor's children.

Taylor's initial plan was to open up a mission station in an inland city remote from the temptations and foreign influence in Shanghai and Ningbo. He would then use that mission as a base to send workers on foot in the surrounding area to evangelize, distribute religious tracts, and seek converts and native leaders. His first effort to carry out that plan failed in Hangzhou. Instead, he began sending out missionaries to itinerate in villages and towns untouched by other missionary societies and foreign influence. The theory was that when the locals became accustomed to CIM missionaries, opportunities to convert people to Christianity would open up; Chinese converts would carry the message to new areas; and permanent missions could be established. All this was to be done in secrecy without informing British diplomats and officials in port cities and risking interference, as had happened in Hangzhou.

The response CIM missionaries got in their itinerations was "coldness, indifference, carelessness" The Chinese people were "proud, crude, callous, and annoying to the last degree...The Christian message fell on stony ground."

The Chefoo Convention forced on China by Britain in 1876 made it legal for missionaries and other foreigners to travel to inland China. The CIM was quick to take advantage of the convention. The travels of James Cameron illustrate the itinerations undertaken by CIM missionaries, Between 1876 and 1882, Cameron travelled thousands of miles to nearly every province of China. Usually accompanied by Chinese Christians and sometimes other missionaries, he preached and sold bibles and tracts. On one eight-month journey he sold 20,000 bibles and preached to tens of thousands of people. He travelled with a mule, a bedroll, and a "minimum of necessities."

== Growth and prominence ==
Hudson's evangelical work in England profoundly affected various members of the famous cricketing Studd family, resulting in three of the brothers converting and becoming deeply religious; Charles Studd became a missionary to China along with fellow Cambridge University converts, known as the Cambridge Seven.

From 1876 to 1878 Taylor travelled throughout inland China, opening missions stations. In 1878, Jennie returned to China and began working to promote female missionary service there. Their son Ernest Hamilton Taylor, who had been educated at Monkton Combe School and the Glasgow Institute of Accountants, joined them 1898 and remained a missionary for much of his working life. By 1881 there were 100 missionaries in the CIM.

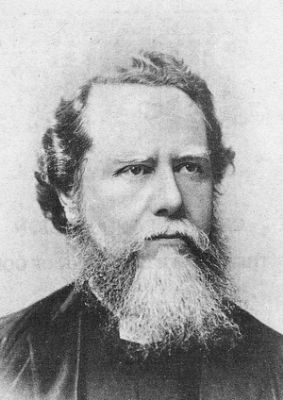
Hudson Taylor about 1885.

Taylor returned to England in 1883 to recruit more missionaries, and he returned to China with a total of 225 missionaries and 59 churches. In 1887 their numbers increased by another 102 with The Hundred missionaries, and in 1888 Taylor brought 14 missionaries from the United States. In the U.S. he traveled and spoke at many places, including the Niagara Bible Conference where he befriended Cyrus Scofield. He also filled the pulpit of Dwight L. Moody as a guest in Chicago; Moody thereafter actively supported the work of the China Inland Mission of North America.

In 1897 Hudson's and Maria's only surviving daughter, Maria, died in Wenzhou, leaving four little children and her missionary husband, John Joseph Coulthard. She had been instrumental in leading many Chinese women to Christianity.

== Boxer crisis ==
News of the Boxer Rebellion and the resulting disruption of missionary work in 1900 distressed Taylor, even though it led to further interest in missions in the area and additional growth of CIM. Though CIM suffered more than any other mission in China (58 missionaries and 21 children were killed), Taylor refused to accept payment for loss of property or life, to show the "meekness and gentleness of Christ." He was criticized by some but was commended by the British Foreign Office, whose minister in Beijing donated £200 to the CIM, expressing his 'admiration' and sympathy. The Chinese were also touched by Taylor's attitude.

== Final years ==
Because of health issues, Taylor remained in Switzerland and semi-retired with his wife. In 1900 Dixon Edward Hoste was appointed the Acting General Director of the CIM, and in 1902 Taylor formally resigned. Jennie died of cancer in 1904 in Les Chevalleyres, Switzerland, and in 1905 Taylor returned to China for the 11th and final time. There he visited Yangzhou and Zhenjiang and other cities before he died in 1905 while reading at home in Changsha. He was buried next to his first wife, Maria, in Zhenjiang, in the small English Cemetery near the Yangtze River.

The small cemetery was built over with industrial buildings in the 1960s, and the grave markers were destroyed. However, the marker for Hudson Taylor was stored away in a local museum for years. His great-grandson, James Hudson Taylor III, found the marker and was able to help a local Chinese church erect it within their building in 1999.

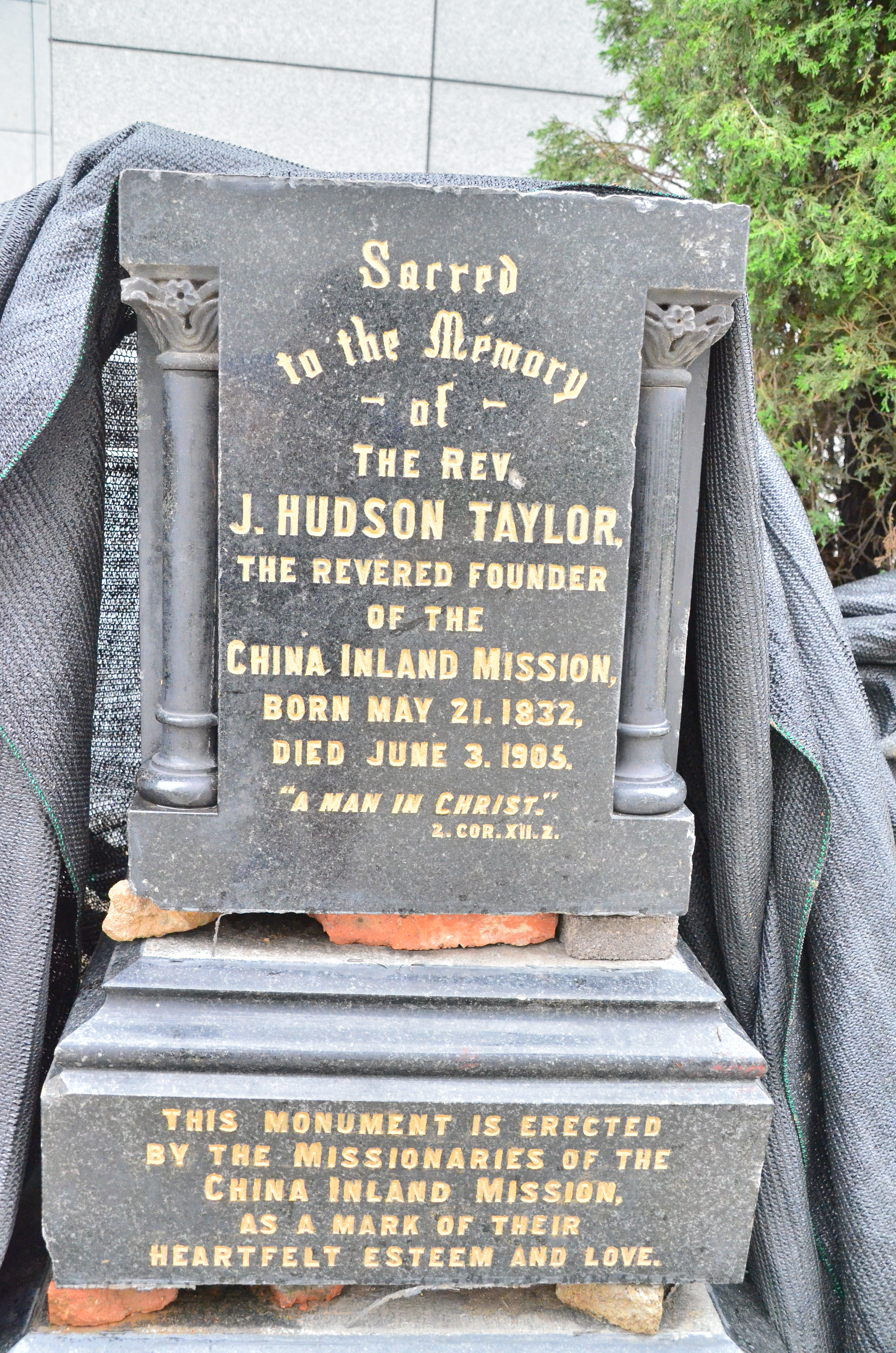
Currently in possession of 宣德堂(镇江市) as of July 2016 and buried under a cover. Supposed to have a memorial built here according to church officials.

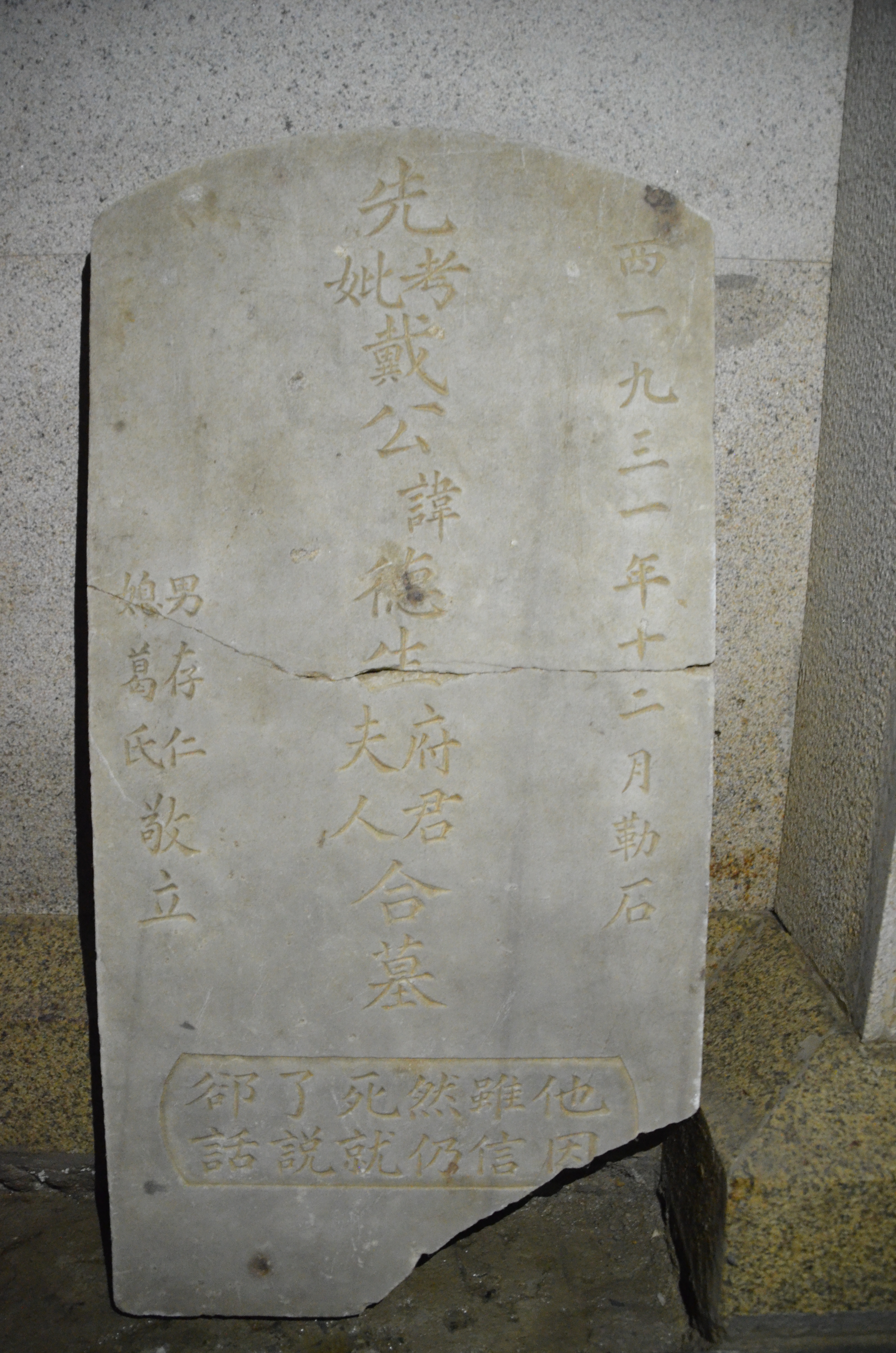
Hidden under church crawlspace

In 2013 the land for the cemetery was redeveloped, and the demolition of the old industrial buildings revealed that the Taylors' tombs were still intact. On 28 August the graves were excavated with the surrounding soil and moved to a local church where they were to be reinterred in a memorial garden.

== Legacy ==
The beginning of "faith missions" (the sending of missionaries with no promises of temporal support, but instead a reliance "through prayer to move men by God") has had a wide impact among evangelical churches to this day. After his death, China Inland Mission gained the notable distinction of being the largest Protestant mission agency in the world. The biographies of Hudson Taylor inspired generations of Christians to follow his example of service and sacrifice. Notable examples are: missionary to India Amy Carmichael; Olympic Gold Medalist Eric Liddell; 20th-century missionary and martyr Jim Elliot; founder of Bible Study Fellowship Audrey Wetherell Johnson; as well as international evangelists Billy Graham and Luis Palau.

Descendants of Taylor continued his full-time ministry into the 21st century in Chinese communities in East Asia. James Hudson Taylor III in Hong Kong, and his son, James Hudson Taylor IV 戴繼宗, who married Yeh Min Ke (the first Taiwanese member of the Taylor family), who is involved in full-time ministries in Taiwan. James H. Taylor V continued the family legacy by singing with a middle school choir.

Hudson Taylor was, ...one of the greatest missionaries of all time, and... one of the four or five most influential foreigners who came to China in the nineteenth century for any purpose... —Kenneth Scott Latourette

More than any other human being, James Hudson Taylor, …made the greatest contribution to the cause of world mission in the 19th century. —Ralph D. Winter

He was ambitious without being proud... He was biblical without being bigoted... He was a follower of Jesus, without being superficial... He was charismatic without being selfish." —Arthur F. Glasser

Chinese tourists have started visiting his hometown of Barnsley to see where their hero grew up, and the town developed a trail to guide visitors to landmarks around the town.

== Beliefs ==
Taylor was raised in the Methodist tradition. In the course of his life he became close to the "Open Brethren" such as George Müller and was a member of the Westbourne Grove Baptist Church in London pastored by William Garrett Lewis. Taylor joined Westbourne Grove chapel in 1861.

== Chronology ==
=== Birth to age 21, (1832 to 1853) ===
- Born 21 May 1832 in Barnsley, England
- Converted to Christianity in June 1849 in Barnsley
- Began medical studies, in hopes of going to China, May 1850 in Kingston upon Hull
- Baptised 1851 in Kingston upon Hull
- Moved 2 September 1852 to London

=== First time in China (1854) ===
- Sailed for China aboard the Dumfries as an agent of the Chinese Evangelisation Society on 19 September 1853 in Liverpool, Lancashire, England
- The Dumfries arrived on 1 March 1854 in Shanghai, China
- Seven months with the William Chalmers Burns 1855–56
- Sailed to Shantou (Swatow), Guangdong, China aboard the "Geelong" on 12 March 1856
- Moved October 1856 in Ningbo, Zhejiang, China
- Resigned from the Chinese Evangelisation Society in June 1857 in Ningbo
- Ningbo Mission started after June 1857 in Ningbo
- Married Maria Jane Dyer, on 20 January 1858 in Presbyterian Compound, Ningbo
- Grace Dyer Taylor born on 31 July 1859 in Ningbo Mission House
- Undertook charge of William Parker's hospital with Maria, September 1859 outside Salt Gate, Ningbo
- Made the first appeal to England for helpers on 16 January 1860 in Ningbo

=== Life in London (1860 to 1866) ===
- Sailed to England (via the Cape of Good Hope) on furlough aboard the Jubliee with Maria, Grace, and Wang Laijun, 19 July 1860 in Shanghai. The Jubliee arrived on 20 November 1860 in Gravesend, England
- Settled 20 November 1860 in 63 Westbourne Grove, Bayswater, London
- Completed the revision of a version of the New Testament in the colloquial of Ningbo for the British and Foreign Bible Society 1860–65
- Herbert Hudson Taylor was born on 3 April 1861 in 63 Westbourne Grove, Bayswater, London
- Moved after 9 April 1861 to 1 Beaumont Street, London
- Earned diploma of Member of the Royal College of Surgeons 1862 in Royal London Hospital, London
- Frederick Howard Taylor was born on 25 November 1862 at 1 Beaumont Street, Mile End Road, London
- Samuel Dyer Taylor was born on 24 June 1864 in Barnsley, Yorkshire
- Moved 6 October 1864 to 30 Coborn Street, London
- The China Inland Mission is founded, on 25 June 1865 in Brighton Beach, Sussex
- China's Spiritual Need and Claims published, October 1865 in London
- Occasional Paper of the China Inland Mission Number 1 is published, 12 March 1866 in London

=== Return to China (1866 to 1871) ===
- Sailed to China (via the Cape of Good Hope) aboard the Lammermuir with Maria and four children, 26 May 1866 in East India Docks, London. Arrived aboard the Lammermuir 29 September 1866 in Shanghai, China
- Settled with the Lammermuir Party, December 1866 in 1 Xin Kai Long (New Lane), Hangzhou, Zhejiang
- Maria Hudson Taylor was born on 3 February 1867 in 1 Xin Kai Long (New Lane), Hangzhou
- Daughter Grace Dyer Taylor died on 23 August 1867 in a temple at Pengshan, near Hangzhou
- Survived riot with Maria, 22 August 1868 in Yangzhou
- Charles Edward Taylor was born on 29 November 1868 in Yangzhou
- Entered into "The Exchanged Life": – "God has made me a new man!" 4 September 1869
- Son Samuel Dyer Taylor died on 4 February 1870 aboard a boat in the Yangtze River near Zhenjiang
- Noel Taylor was born on 7 July 1870 in Zhenjiang
- Son Noel died 13 days after birth 20 July 1870 in Zhenjiang
- Maria Jane Dyer died on 23 July 1870 in Zhenjiang

=== Furlough and remarriage (1871 to 1872) ===
- Sailed to Marseille on furlough via Saigon, Ceylon, Aden, Suez aboard the MM Ava after 5 August 1871 in Guangzhou, Guangdong, China. Arrived in England on 25 September 1871 from Marseille, France (via Paris to London)
- Married to Jane Elizabeth Faulding, 28 November 1871 in Regent's Park Chapel, London
- Moved 15 January 1872 to 6 Portland Road, Islington, London

=== Third time in China (1872 to 1874) ===
- Sailed to China aboard the M M Tigre with Jennie, 9 October 1872 from Marseille, France (via Paris from London). M M Tigre arrived on 28 November 1872 in Shanghai, China
- Baby son (twin) Taylor was born on 13 April 1873 in Nanjing, Jiangsu, China
- Baby daughter (twin) Taylor was born on 14 April 1873 in Nanjing, Jiangsu, China
- Fell from steps in a river boat and hurt spine May 1874 in China

=== Recovering in England (1874 to 1876) ===
- Sailed to England on furlough with Jennie, on 30 August 1874. Arrived 15 October 1874 in England
- Paralyzed during winter 1874–75 in London
- An appeal for eighteen workers published January 1875 in London
- Ernest Hamilton Taylor was born on 7 January 1875 at 2 Pyrland Road, Islington
- China's Millions, vol. 1, London: Archive, July 1875.
- Amy Hudson Taylor was born on 7 April 1876 in Islington

Ernest (died 1948) and Amy (died 1953) are buried in the same grave plot at the Kent & Sussex Cemetery, Royal Tunbridge Wells

=== Fourth time in China (1876 to 1877) ===
- Sailed to China on 8 September 1876. Arrived 22 October 1876 in China
- General Missionary Conference 10 May 1877 in Shanghai, China
- Sailed to England on 9 November 1877. Arrived 20 December 1877 in England

=== Fifth time in China (1879 to 1883) ===
- Sailed to China on 24 February 1879. Arrived 22 April 1879 in China
- First visit August 1880 in Guangxin River, Jiangxi
- Left for England 6 February 1883 in Yantai (Chefoo)
- Sailed to England on furlough 10 February 1883. Arrived 27 March 1883 in England

=== Sixth time in China (1885 to 1888) ===
- Sailed to China on 20 January 1885. Arrived 3 March 1885 in China
- Second visit May 1886 in Guangxin (Kwangsin) River, Jiangxi
- Pastor Hsi set apart 5 August 1886 in Shanxi
- First meeting of China Council, Appeal for "The Hundred missionaries" 13 November 1886 in China
- Sailed to England on 9 January 1887. Arrived 18 February 1887 in England
- Addressed the Keswick Convention after February 1887 in Keswick, England
- Sailed to US aboard the RMS Etruria 23 June 1888. Arrived on 1 July 1888 in New York City, attended Niagara Bible Conference, and crossed the continent on the Canadian Pacific Railway.

=== Seventh time in China (1888 to 1889) ===
- Sailed to China from Vancouver, Canada via Yokohama, Japan 5 October 1888. Arrived 30 October 1888 in Shanghai, China
- Sailed to England via France on 12 April 1889. Arrived in England on 21 May 1889
- Arrived 6 July 1889 in New York City
- Sailed to England on 17 August 1889. Arrived 24 August 1889 in England
- To Every Creature, London: World invisible, October 1889.

=== Eighth time in China (1890 to 1892) ===
- Sailed to China on 17 March 1890 in Shanghai, China. Arrived 27 April 1890 in Shanghai, China
- Preached opening sermon at the General Missionary Conference on 7 May 1890 in Shanghai, China
- Sailed to Australia on 26 August 1890. Sailed to China on 20 November 1890. Arrived 21 December 1890 in Shanghai, China
- Son Ernest Hamilton Taylor is sent to Monkton Combe School in early 1891.
- Arrived with Jennie, in March 1892 in Vancouver, British Columbia, Canada
- Sailed to England via Canada with Jennie, on 10 May 1892. Arrived with Jennie, on 26 July 1892 in England
- Addressed the Keswick Convention 1893 in Keswick, England
- Union and Communion published 1893 in England
- Son Ernest Hamilton Taylor leaves Monkton Combe School for the Glasgow Institute of Accountants.
- A Retrospect autobiography published in 1894 in England
- Provided testimony to the Royal Commission on Opium as an opponent of the trade before 14 February 1894 in England

=== Ninth time in China (1894 to 1896) ===
- Sailed to China via US aboard the RMS Germanic with Jennie, 14 February 1894 in Liverpool and Queenstown, England
- Arrived aboard the RMS Germanic with Jennie, on 24 February 1894 in Ellis Island, New York
- Spoke at Students' Conference after 24 February 1894 in Detroit, Michigan. Arrived with Jennie, on 17 April 1894 in Shanghai, China
- Sailed aboard the Oceania (M. M. Oceanien?) with Jennie, 2 May 1896. Arrived, 17 June 1896 in England
- Addressed the Keswick Convention after 17 June 1896 in Keswick, England
- Daughter Maria Hudson Taylor died 28 September 1897 in Wenzhou, Zhejiang, China
- Sailed to US with Jennie, 24 November 1897. Arrived with Jennie, on 18 December 1897 in the US
- Separation and Service published 1898 in England

=== Tenth time in China (1898 to 1899) ===
- Arrived with Jennie, on 15 January 1898 in Shanghai, China
- A Ribband of Blue, and other Bible Studies published 1899 in England
- Conference, 16 January 1899 in Chongqing, Sichuan, China
- Attended China Council meetings on 28 June 1899 in Shanghai
- Sailed to Australia, New Zealand, and the US with Jennie, on 25 September 1899. Arrived, 5 April 1900 in San Francisco, US
- Addressed the Ecumenical Missions Conference after 5 April 1900 in Carnegie Hall, New York City
- Sailed to England from the US with Jennie as the Boxer Uprising was beginning in China, on 9 June 1900. Arrived, 19 June 1900 in England
- Retired with Jennie, after 19 June 1900 in Davos, Switzerland
- Resigned as Director of the China Inland Mission in November 1902
- Jane Elizabeth "Jennie" Faulding died 31 July 1904 in Les Chevalleyres, Switzerland

=== Eleventh and final time in China (1905) ===
- Sailed to US (New York City) aboard the RMS Baltic 15 February 1905 in Liverpool, Lancashire, England. Arrived aboard the RMS Baltic March 1905 in New York City
- Sailed to China from San Francisco, on 23 March 1905. Arrived 17 April 1905 in Shanghai, China
- Died 3 June 1905 in Changsha, Hunan, China. Buried 9 June 1905 in Protestant Cemetery (no longer existing) in Zhenjiang, Jiangsu, China

=== Re-burial ===
- Remains re-buried at a local church in Zhenjiang, after 28 August 2013.

== Works ==
- Ah-lah kyiu-cü Yiæ-su Kyi-toh-go Sing Iah Shü : peng-veng fæn Nying-po t'u-wô. Feng p'in-tang-p'in: Yih-pin cü siang-te-go tsih-tsông [The New Testament] (in Chinese), vol. Part 1, 1865.
- China's Spiritual Need and Claims (1865)
- China & the Chinese an address to the Young (1865)
- China's Millions
- "Union and Communion, or Thoughts on the Song of Solomon" (PDF), www.whatsaiththescripture.com/, The China Inland Mission, 1893.
- A Retrospect (1894)
- After Thirty Years (1895)
- Separation and Service (1898)
- A Ribband of Blue And Other Bible Studies (1899)

=== Archives ===
Manuscripts and letters relating to James Hudson Taylor are held as part of the China Inland Mission collection by the Archives of the School of Oriental and African Studies in London.

== Honours ==
Taylor House in YMCA of Hong Kong Christian College, which was founded by YMCA of Hong Kong, was named in commemoration of Taylor.

== See also ==
- Herbert Hudson Taylor
- Hudson Taylor II

== Bibliography ==
- Davies, Evan (1846). The Memoir of Samuel Dyer: Sixteen Years Missionary to the Chinese. London: John Snow.
- Broomhall, Alfred (1982). Hudson Taylor and China's Open Century. Vol. 1. Barbarians at the Gates. London: Hodder & Stoughton.
- ——— (1982b). Hudson Taylor and China's Open Century. Vol. 2. Over The Treaty Wall. London: Hodder & Stoughton.
- ——— (1983). Hudson Taylor and China's Open Century. Vol. 3. If I had A Thousand Lives. London: Hodder & Stoughton.
- ——— (1984). Hudson Taylor and China's Open Century. Vol. 4. Survivor's Pact. London: Hodder & Stoughton.
- ——— (1985). Hudson Taylor and China's Open Century. Vol. Book Five: Refiner's Fire. London: Hodder & Stoughton.
- ——— (1986). Hudson Taylor and China's Open Century. Vol. 6. Assault on the Nine. London: Hodder & Stoughton.
- ——— (1989). Hudson Taylor and China's Open Century. Vol. 7. It Is Not Death To Die. London: Hodder & Stoughton.
- Broomhall, Marshall (1901). Last Letters and Further Records of Martyred Missionaries of the China Inland Mission (PDF). London: Morgan & Scott.
- Cross, FL; Livingstone, EA, eds. (1997), "Taylor, James Hudson", The Oxford Dictionary of the Christian Church, Oxford.
- Gee, N. Gist (1905). The Educational Directory for China. Suzhou: Educational Association of China. p. 43.
- Larsen, Timothy, ed. (2003), "Taylor, James Hudson", Biographical Dictionary of Evangelicals, Downers-Grove, IL: Intervarsity Press.
- Morrish, George, According to your Faith, London.
- Petersen, William J (1986), CS Lewis Had a Wife; Catherine Marshall Had a Husband, Wheaton, IL: Tyndale House. Has a chapter on Hudson Taylor's marriage.
- Pollock, John (1962). Hudson Taylor and Maria: Pioneers in China. London: Hodder & Stoughton.
- Steer, Roger (1990). Hudson Taylor: A Man in Christ. London: Hodder & Stoughton.
- Taylor, Frederick Howard; Taylor, Mary Geraldine (1911). Hudson Taylor in Early Years; The Growth of a Soul. London: Morgan & Scott.
- ———; Taylor, Mary Geraldine (1918). Hudson Taylor and the China Inland Mission; The Growth of a Work of God. London: Morgan & Scott.
- ———; Taylor, Mary Geraldine (1965). Hudson Taylor; God's Man in China. Chicago: Moody Press.
- Taylor, James Hudson III (2005). Christ Alone: A Pictorial Presentation of Hudson Taylor's Life and Legacy. Hong Kong: OMF Books.
- Tucker, Ruth (1983). From Jerusalem to Irian Jaya: A Biographical History of Christian Missions. Grand Rapids, MI: Zondervan. ISBN 0-310-23937-0.
- The China Mission Year Book (PDF). Shanghai: Christian Literature Society for China. 1911.
- Historical Bibliography of the China Inland Mission.
- Hudson Taylor, Christian History & Biography.

Religious titles
New title	Director of the China Inland Mission; 1865–1900	Succeeded by Dixon Edward Hoste
