= Cambridge Seven =

British missionaries to China in 1885

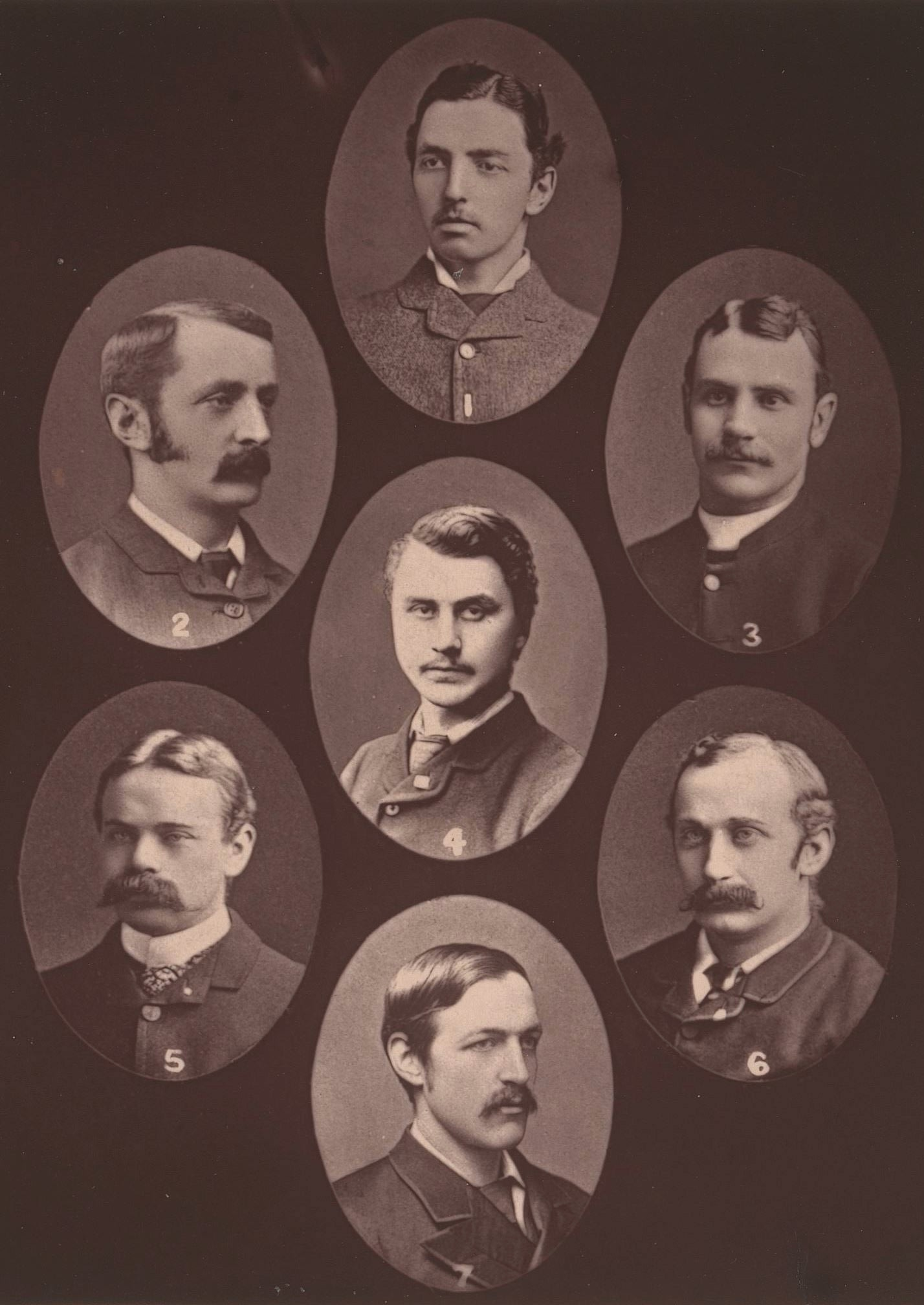
Portraits of the Cambridge Seven: 1. Charles Thomas Studd, 2. Dixon Edward Hoste, 3. William Wharton Cassels, 4. Stanley P. Smith, 5. Cecil H. Polhill-Turner, 6. Arthur T. Polhill-Turner, 7. Montagu Proctor-Beauchamp.

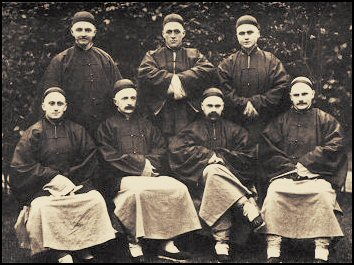
The Cambridge Seven in Qing-dynasty mandarin clothing – 1885

The Cambridge Seven were seven students from Cambridge University and one from the Royal Military Academy, Woolwich, who in 1885 decided to become missionaries to China through the China Inland Mission. The seven were:

- Charles Thomas Studd
- Montagu Harry Proctor Beauchamp
- Stanley P. Smith
- Dixon Edward Hoste
- Arthur T. Polhill-Turner
- Cecil H. Polhill-Turner
- William Cassels

During the Victorian era (1837–1901), increasing numbers of University of Cambridge students pursued overseas service as missionaries, clergy, educators, physicians, and linguists. In 1881, the Cambridge Centre for Christianity Worldwide (then Henry Martyn Hall) was established to support university members interested in missionary work abroad.[3] When British missionary Hudson Taylor visited Cambridge in 1885, six students volunteered to join the China Inland Mission. Before departing, these six, along with Dixon Edward Hoste of the Royal Military Academy, Woolwich, conducted a farewell tour across the country. During this tour, they became known as "The Cambridge Seven."

After their acceptance into the China Inland Mission, the seven toured England and Scotland, preaching and appealing to their listeners to follow their example and follow Christ. Charles Studd's brother Kynaston helped the seven in their preparations for departure.

== Assessment ==
The conversion and example of the seven was one of the grand gestures of 19th-century missions, making them religious celebrities; their story was published as The Evangelisation of the World and was distributed to every YMCA and YWCA throughout the British Empire and the United States.

Though their time together was brief, they helped catapult the China Inland Mission from obscurity to "almost embarrassing prominence", and their work helped to inspire many recruits for the CIM and other mission societies. In 1885, when the Seven first arrived in China, the CIM had 163 missionaries; this had doubled by 1890 and reached some 800 by 1900, which represented one-third of the entire Protestant missionary force.

== Work ==
The Cambridge Seven arrived in Shanghai on 18 March 1885 and engaged in a variety of ministries throughout China:

- William Wharton Cassels worked in China for ten years and then returned to England in 1895, where he was consecrated as the new Bishop of a new diocese in Western China (Szechwan). He then returned to Western China – he lived there until his death in 1925, and was buried in the garden of St John's Cathedral, Langzhong.
- Stanley Peregrine Smith was sent to North China. There he learned Chinese language and soon became as fluent a preacher in Chinese as he was in English. He died in China on 31 January 1931.
- Charles Studd, one of the famous Studd brothers, who was before his missionary work well known as an English cricketer – having played in the famous Ashes series against Australia, was probably the best known of "The Cambridge Seven". He was sent home because of ill health in 1894. Later he worked in India and Africa and was the founder of WEC. He died in 1931.
- Arthur T. Polhill-Turner was ordained as a minister in 1888 and moved to the densely populated countryside of Szechwan to reach as many people as he could. He remained in China throughout the uprisings against foreigners at the turn of the century and did not leave there until 1928, when he retired and returned to England. He died in 1935.
- Cecil H. Polhill-Turner stayed in the same province with the others for a while before moving to the northwest, in the direction of Tibet. During a violent riot there, he and his wife were both nearly killed in 1892. In 1900, his health failed, and he was sent home to England, where he was strongly advised against a return to China. Despite this ban, his heart remained there, and throughout the rest of his life, he made seven prolonged missionary visits. In 1908, in Sunderland, he became the leader of the Pentecostal Missionary Union and was greatly involved in the formation of the Pentecostal Movement in Britain. He died in England in 1938.
- Montagu Harry Proctor Beauchamp was evacuated from China in 1900 because of the uprisings but returned to China in 1902. He then returned to England in 1911 and served as a chaplain with the British Army and Vicar of Monkton Combe in Somerset. His son became a second-generation missionary in China and in 1935 he returned to China; he died at his son's mission station in 1939, in Paoning, and was buried in the cemetery of St John's Cathedral, Langzhong.
- Dixon Hoste was the only one of the Cambridge Seven who was not educated at Cambridge. He succeeded Hudson Taylor as the Director of the China Inland Mission and for thirty years, he led the Mission. He retired in 1935 but remained in China and was interned by the Japanese during the Second World War. He died in London, in May 1946 and was the last member of "The Cambridge Seven" to die.

== See also ==
- History of Anglicanism in Sichuan
- Historical Bibliography of the China Inland Mission
- China–United Kingdom relations
- OMF International
- Cambridge Inter-Collegiate Christian Union
