= Hudson Taylor III =

Hudson Taylor III, full name James Hudson Taylor III (simplified Chinese: 戴绍曾; traditional Chinese: 戴紹曾; pinyin: Dài Shàocéng; 1929 — 2009), was a great grandson of Hudson Taylor. Born and raised in China, he later became the general director of the Overseas Missionary Fellowship (OMF), founding president of the China Evangelical Seminary and founding president of the Medical Services International (MSI). He was respected by both Chinese government officials and church leaders.

== Biography ==
Hudson Taylor III was born in Kaifeng, Henan Province, China on August 12, 1929. His parents were missionaries there of the Free Methodist Church. Having grown up in China, Hudson Taylor III spoke fluent Mandarin and possessed a considerable understanding of Chinese literature, gaining a deep understanding of the Chinese way of thinking.

After the outbreak of the Pacific War in 1937, many British and American missionaries and their families were imprisoned in the Japanese concentration camp in Weifang, Shandong. In 1942, 12-year-old Taylor was imprisoned there, together with his classmates, a brother, two sisters, and his grandfather Herbert Hudson Taylor. And there, he was mentored by missionaries such as Eric Liddell. They stayed in prison until after Japan's defeat in 1945, when they were liberated by the American army.

In 1946, Hudson Taylor III returned to the United States for further education, graduating from Spring Arbor College, Asbury Theological Seminary and Yale University. In 1951, he married his college classmate, Leone Tjepkema.

In June 1955, the young Hudson Taylor III and his wife arrived in Kaohsiung, Taiwan, and began their missionary ministry. He taught at the Holy Light Bible School, which was founded by his father. In 1960, he became president of the school.

In 1970, he became the founding president of China Evangelical Seminary.

In 1980, he became the seventh general director of the Overseas Missionary Fellowship (OMF).

In 1988 Hudson Taylor III discovered the tombstone of Hudson Taylor in Zhenjiang Museum. The remainder of the memorial was re-erected inside a nearby church in 1999. In 2018, the Hudson Taylor Memorial Building, where the great missionary was bury, was opened in Zhenjiang.

In 1991, Hudson Taylor III and his wife moved to Hong Kong, after handing over leadership of the mission agency to David Pickard.

In 1994, Hudson Taylor III founded the Medical Services International (MSI) in mainland China. Later in the same year, his son Hudson Taylor IV married Taiwanese girl Ke Yeh Min, bringing Chinese blood into the Taylor family.

In 2007, Hudson Taylor III was awarded the title of "Honorary Citizen" by the government of a mountainous county in Sichuan Province. In 2008, he encouraged Hong Kong people to participate in the "Sichuan Disaster Relief - Hong Kong Christian Prayer and Action" meeting. For his outstanding contributions to Christian missions, Hudson Taylor III was awarded honorary doctorates from Greenville College (1978) and Asbury Theological Seminary (1987), and was awarded two more honorary doctorates from Tyndale College (2001) and Spring Arbor University (2008).

At 4:00 am on March 20, 2009, Hudson Taylor III died in Hong Kong due to liver cancer at the age of 79. He left behind his wife and three children (including Hudson Taylor IV) and nine grandchildren (including Hudson Taylor V). A funeral service was held at Kowloon City Baptist Church on April 4 of the same year.

== OMF International ==
OMF International (formerly Overseas Missionary Fellowship, and before 1964 the China Inland Mission) is an inter-denominational Christian missionary society with an international centre in Singapore. It was founded in Britain by Hudson Taylor on 25 June 1865.

In the early 1950s, following the departure of all of its foreign workers from China mainland, the China Inland Mission redirected its missionaries to other parts of East Asia. And the name was changed to the "Overseas Missionary Fellowship (OMF)" in 1964, and then to the current name in the 1990s. The vision remains unchanged: to proclaim the Gospel to the “un-reached people, un-reached places.” The present OMF International chairman is Hudson Taylor IV.

== China Evangelical Seminary ==
China Evangelical Seminary (CES, Chinese: 中華福音神學院; pinyin: Zhōnghuá Fúyīn Shénxuéyuàn) is a private non-denominational, evangelical seminary in Taiwan. It was established in 1970 by Hudson Taylor III, based on the thought of "localization of the Gospel" by Hudson Taylor. CES is the first graduate-level seminary in Taiwan. It recruits university graduates who are clear about their calling. Before moving to Taoyuan City in 2019, its main campus was based in Taipei for the first 49 years. The present president of the seminary is James Hudson Taylor IV (2020–present).

== Medical Services International ==
In 1994, together with several friends from Hong Kong, Hudson Taylor III founded Medical Services International (MSI) in mainland China. During his ten-year tenure as president, MSI expanded from an international medical services organization to an international professional services organization, diversifying its services to healthcare, English language teaching, community development, animal husbandry, youth work, and business administration, etc.

== See also ==
- Hudson Taylor,
- Herbert Hudson Taylor
- Hudson Taylor II
- Hudson Taylor IV,
- Overseas Missionary Fellowship
- China Evangelical Seminary
