= W. H. Aldis =

English Anglican missionary

The Reverend William Henry Aldis
- Deacon
- Church: Church in China
- Diocese: Western China
- Installed: 1900
- Term ended: 1916

Orders
- Ordination: 30 November 1900 by William Cassels

Personal details
- Born: 1871
- Died: 16 June 1948 (aged 76–77)
- Denomination: Anglican
- Parents: Henry Aldis; Sarah Kitchen
- Spouse: Lottie Carver (m. 1902)
- Children: 3 sons and 1 daughter
- Occupation: Missionary

William Henry Aldis (1871 – 16 June 1948) was an English Anglican missionary who served as Chairman of the Keswick Convention from 1936 to 1939, and again from 1946 to 1947.

== Life and career ==
W. H. Aldis was born in 1871 to Henry S. Aldis, a confidential clerk to a business firm in Reading, and Sarah Kitchen. His grandfather John Aldis was a Baptist pastor of King's Road Chapel in Reading (now renamed Abbey Baptist Church). He grew up in the milieu of Children's Special Service Mission. In 1895, while worshipping in a church of the Countess of Huntingdon's Connexion at Basingstoke, Aldis learned of the Kucheng massacre of Western Christians and missionaries that took place at Kucheng (now Gutian), China, which aroused his interest in China missions. This led him to join the China Inland Mission (CIM), an interdenominational missionary society. Despite his Nonconformist background, he committed himself to CIM's Church of England branch.

He left England for Great Qing on 8 October 1897. After spending some months at a training home in Anqing (Anking), he left for the Baoning (Paoning) district of Sichuan ("West China" or "Western China"), on 28 April 1898, which he reached on 24 May. In 1899, the Boxer Rebellion prompted Aldis to join missionaries who moved to Shanghai, where he was ordained a deacon by Bishop Cassels at the city's Holy Trinity Cathedral in 1900. He was one of the sub-editors during the initial years of The West China Missionary News first published in 1899.

While working for the Anglican Diocese of Western China, Aldis felt the need of a school on Western lines (i.e. Western education) for sons of Christians, and in the beginning of 1902 the schoold opened with about twenty boys, about half being boarders. Early in 1903 several were converted and baptized, among them James Yen, who in the 1920s founded the Mass Education Movement and in the 1940s the Sino-American Rural Reconstruction Commission. Aldis's "loving ministry to these lads has been abundantly rewarded", remarked Rev. C. B. Hannah. This subsequently led to the establishment of West China Diocesan College (天道學堂), of which Aldis became the principal.

At the end of 1906, Aldis left Sichuan for furlough in England. He returned in 1908 and remained at his post until 1916. During this time, Ku Ho-lin, a convert from Islam and the future Assistant Bishop of East Szechwan, became a constant associate of Aldis's, who was going to be the first Chinese to be ordained deacon.

Back in England, Aldis became Secretary of the Youth Department of the China Inland Mission in 1919. According to his biographer Andrew MacBeath, "his work as Secretary for Youth had paved the way for the success of the great enrolment of recruits from 1929 to 1931." At this time he came into contact with "He-Evelyn" (Evelyn Waugh) and "She-Evelyn" (Evelyn Gardner), who found him "ridiculous"; but "young people found him warm and understanding, yes, admiring, too", as specified by MacBeath. On 27 June 1928, Aldis conducted the wedding service for the Evelyns at St Paul's Church, Portman Square. Shortly after the Evelyns' marriage, in 1929, he succeeded John Stuart Holden (1874–1934) as Home Director of the China Inland Mission. He had also been active in the Keswick Convention, he was made leader of its morning missionary prayer meeting, then Chairman of the Missionary Meeting, and finally Chairman of the Keswick Council. He chaired the conventions from 1936 to 1939, and again from 1946 to 1947.

Aldis died on 16 June 1948, his funeral service was held the following Monday (21 June) in St Stephen's Church, Tunbridge Wells, and a memorial service in St Paul's Church, Portman Square on 29 June.

== Personal life ==
W. H. Aldis married Lottie H. Carver of Norwich in Baoning (Paoning), the service was conducted in the Paoning Church by Bishop Cassels on 28 May 1902. They had a daughter died in infancy in 1904; their first of three sons, Gordon, was born in 1905.

== See also ==
- Anglicanism in Sichuan
