= John Holden (bishop) =

British bishop

- Bishop of West Szechwan
- John Holden, c. 1920s
- Church: Church in China
- Diocese: West Szechwan
- Installed: 1936
- Term ended: 1937
- Predecessor: Howard Mowll (as Bishop of Western China)
- Successor: Song Cheng-tsi
- Other posts: Bishop of Kwangsi-Hunan (1923–1933); Bishop of Western China (1933–1936); Assistant Bishop of Truro (1938–1949)

Personal details
- Born: 1882
- Died: 1949 (aged 66–67)
- Denomination: Anglican
- Education: St John's College, Durham

John Holden (1882–1949) was a missionary Anglican bishop.

== Biography ==
He was born in 1882 and educated at Durham University He was ordained in 1907 and went to work for the Church Missionary Society in China, becoming in time an archdeacon. In 1923 he became Bishop of Kwangsi-Hunan and was translated to Szechwan (Diocese of Western China) in 1933 and later to Western Szechwan. Returning to England in 1938 he became an Assistant Bishop of Truro (until death), Vicar of St Budock (until 1944), a Canon Residentiary of Truro Cathedral (1944–1947) and then Archdeacon of Cornwall. He died on 14 August 1949.

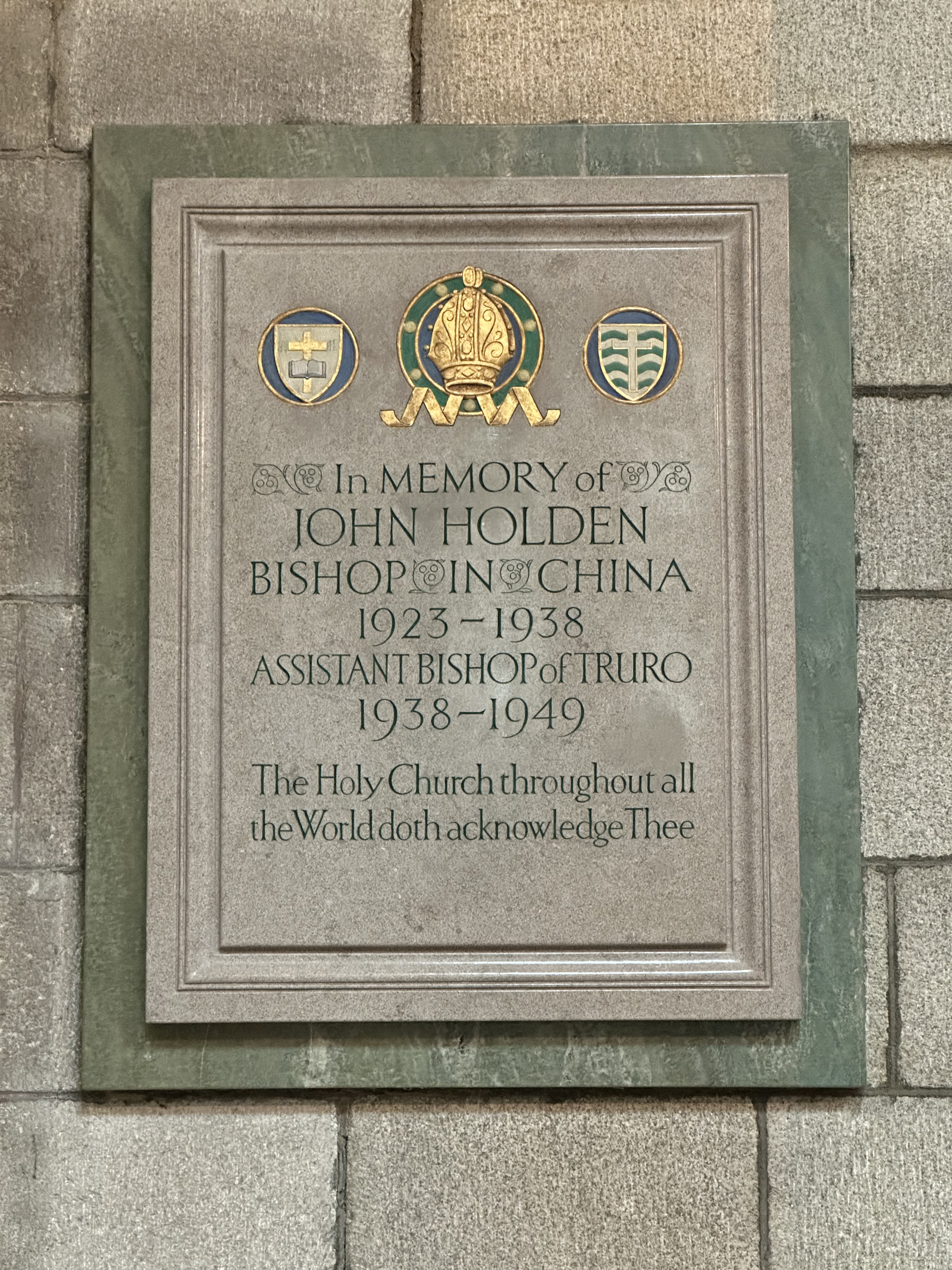
Holden's memorial in Truro Cathedral, featuring the seal of the seal of the Anglican Diocese of Western China on the top right

== See also ==
- Anglicanism in Sichuan
- Diocese of Truro
- Frederick Boreham
