= Trinity Church, Langzhong =

- Protestant Episcopal Church
- 三一堂
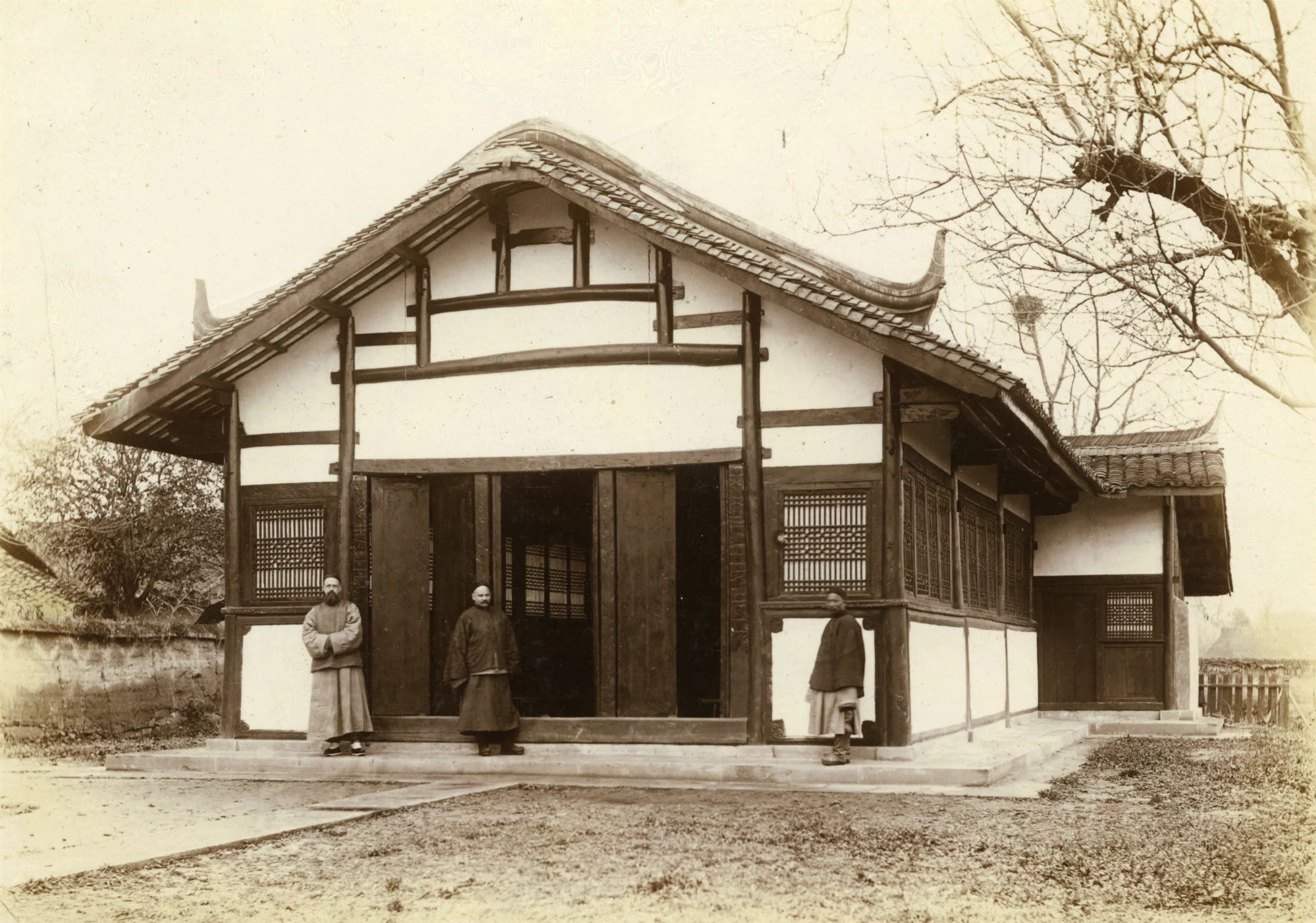
- Trinity Church in 1899. The persons represented as standing outside are Bishop Cassels, Mr Williams, and the Chinese churchwarden. Photograph by Isabella Bird.
- Location: 46 Langjiaguai Street, Langzhong, Sichuan
- Country: China
- Denomination: Three-Self Church (Protestant)
- Previous denomination: Church in China (under the jurisdiction of the Church of England)
- Churchmanship: Low church evangelical

History
- Status: Church
- Founded: 1893
- Founder: William Cassels (China Inland Mission)
- Dedication: Holy Trinity
- Consecrated: 25 December 1893

Architecture
- Functional status: Active
- Style: Western Sichuanese residential style
- Groundbreaking: 1893

Administration
- Province: China (formerly)
- Diocese: Szechwan (formerly); East Szechwan (formerly; since 1936)

Trinity Church, (Note: Chinese: 三一堂; pinyin: Sānyī táng; Wade–Giles: San¹-i¹ tʽang²; Sichuanese romanization: San^{1} I^{5} Tʽang^{2}.) also referred to as Protestant Episcopal Church, is a Protestant church situated on Langjiaguai Street in the county-level city of Langzhong, Nanchong, Sichuan Province. Founded in 1893, the building is the city's oldest surviving Anglican church, formerly belonging to the East Szechwan Diocese of the Church in China. It has been subjected to the control of the state-sanctioned Three-Self Patriotic Church since 1954.

== History ==
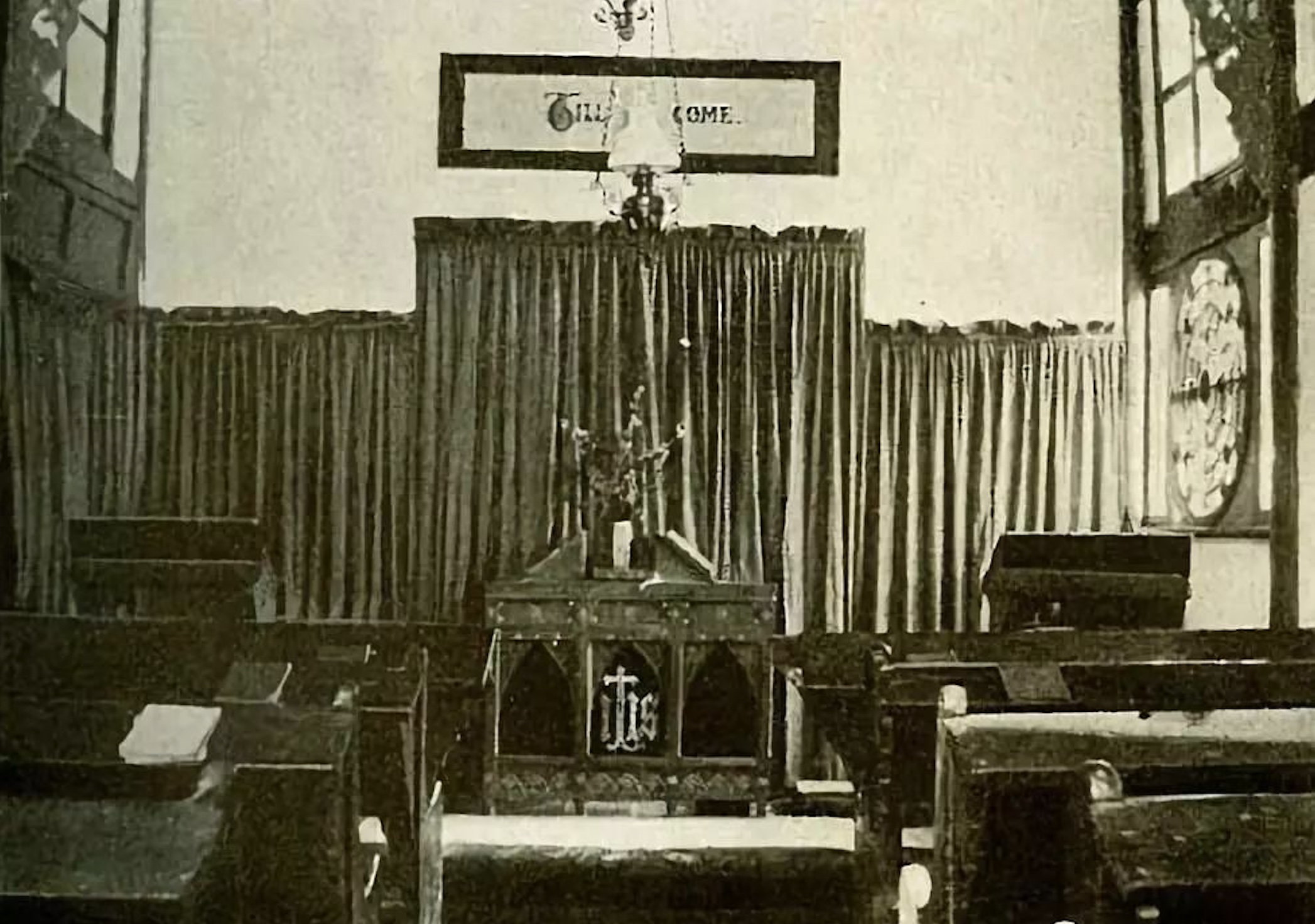
Interior of Trinity Church, 1890s.

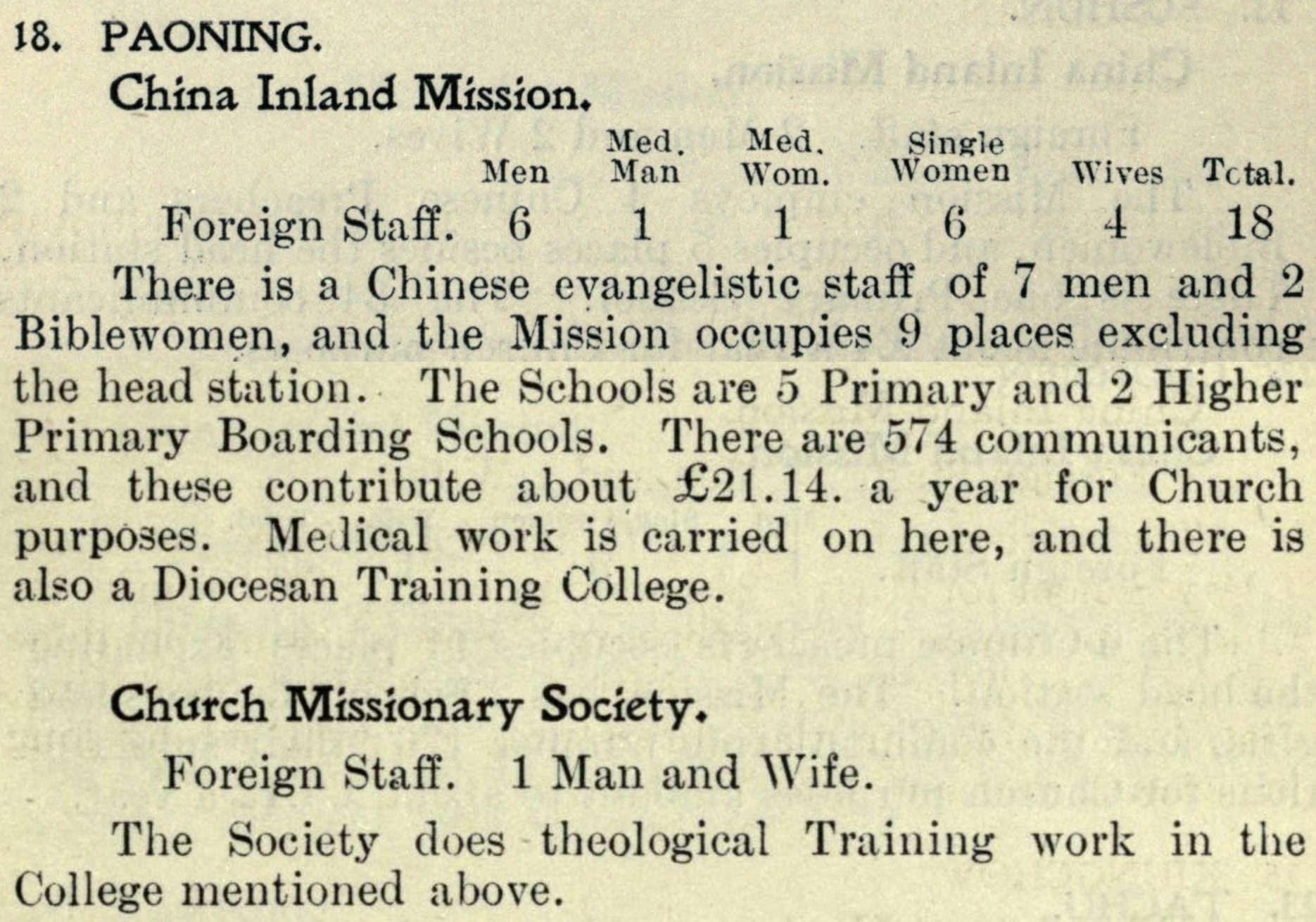
Survey of the mission work of China Inland Mission and Church Missionary Society in Paoning, published in 1913.

Trinity Church was built in 1893 in traditional Sichuanese architectural style, under the supervision of William Cassels, one of the Cambridge Seven who was going to be the missionary bishop of the Diocese of Western China.

As the first Anglican church built in Langzhong (then known as Paoning), the chosen style is in consideration of being more acceptable to the locals. It adopted the style of traditional residential buildings in northwestern Sichuan, fully blended into the surroundings.

The British explorer Isabella Bird described in her book The Yangtze Valley and Beyond, that the church 'is Chinese in style, the chancel windows are "glazed" with coloured paper to simulate stained glass, and it is seated for two hundred'. Despite its small size, 'the church was crammed at matins, and crowds stood outside, where they could both see and hear, this publicity contrasting with the Roman practice.'

More than ten years of missionary work yielded visible results, Trinity Church was no longer capable of accommodating the growing congregation. Implementation of a cathedral construction project started in 1908, after a series of problems, the neo-Gothic Cathedral of St John the Evangelist was eventually built on Yangtianjing Street, just 50 metres away from Trinity Church.

After the communist takeover of China in 1949, Christian Churches in China were forced to sever their ties with respective overseas Churches, which has thus led to the merging of Trinity Church into the communist-established Three-Self Patriotic Church.

Today, the traditional environment has long gone. Trinity Church, however, maintains its original style, with its serenity that is free from the bustling tourist area nearby.

== See also ==
- Anglicanism in Sichuan
- Category:Former Anglican church buildings in Sichuan
- Tongchuan Church – a former Quaker meeting house in Sichuan with similar architectural style
