= The West China Missionary News =

Monthly Protestant news magazine published in Sichuan, West China

- The West China Missionary News of January 1909 (Vol. 11, No. 1)
- Editor: Mary Jane and Robert John Davidson (first editors)
- Categories: News magazine, Protestant missions in Sichuan
- Frequency: Monthly
- Format: A5
- Circulation: Around 400
- Founded: January 1899
- First issue: February 1899 (126 years ago)
- Final issue Number: December 1943 (81 years ago); Vol. 45, Nos. 5–12
- Company: West China Missions Advisory Board
- Country: Qing and Republican China
- Based in: Chengdu
- Language: English
- OCLC: 7549478

The West China Missionary News (WCMN) was a monthly news magazine published in Chengdu (Chengtu) from 1899 to 1943 by the West China Missions Advisory Board, and printed by Canadian Methodist Mission Press. It was aimed at Protestant missionaries working in Sichuan (or referred to as "West China"), (Note: Sichuan, formerly romanized as Szechwan or Sz-Chuan.) and was the first and longest-running English-language newspaper in that province.

== History and overview ==
The establishment of The West China Missionary News was one of the results of a Protestant conference held at Chongqing (Chungking) in January 1899. The periodical was started as a platform of communication among various missionary workers. It came to light in February 1899, under the editorship of Mary Jane Davidson, with the assistance of her husband, Robert John Davidson, who were Quaker missionaries of the Friends' Foreign Mission Association (FFMA). Joseph Beech, an American Methodist missionary, became assistant to the editor at the end of the year 1899; W. H. Aldis was one of the sub-editors.

In 1900, with the help of some members of the FFMA, a small printing press was bought in London and brought to Sichuan by Mary Jane's brother-in-law, A. Warburton Davidson. The early volumes were large in size (8 × 10 1/2 inches), but A5 (5.8 × 8.3 inches) became the Missionary News standard since the publication of Volume 3 (1901), a size adapted to the new press.

As an English newspaper "for the missionaries, about missionaries and written by the missionaries themselves", the positions of editor-in-chief and manager were almost held exclusively by Western missionaries, but local editors such as S. C. Yang (Yang Shao-chuan, a Quaker Christian) joined the editorial board later. Contributors included David Crockett Graham, George John Bond, Vyvyan Donnithorne, Thomas Torrance, Theo Sørensen, and Song Chʻeng-tsi, just to name a few. Although principally aimed at missionaries in West China, the WCMN had subscription services for worldwide readers in Los Angeles. Its highest circulation was around 450. During the Second Sino-Japanese War (1937–1945), the WCMN lost its overseas subscribers and fund donations, it ceased publication after Volume 45 in 1943.

Leslie Gifford Kilborn spoke highly of the Missionary News at the 1942 annual meeting of the West China Border Research Society, saying The News is "a veritable treasure trove of knowledge and scientific research. It not only connects missionaries of diverse denominations in West China, but also covers a wide range of topics including studies of local languages, customs, religion, economics, medicine, natural environment, and ethnic minorities, as well as translation of historical works concerning the Szechwan region. The News serves as a first-hand account of the 1911 Revolution and the various factions arose in Yunnan, Kweichow, and Szechwan during this period, which certainly provides valuable information for regional studies."

== Editors ==
- Mary Jane Davidson (February 1899 – May 1906)
- Mrs. John Parker (August 1902 – December 1906)
- Omar Leslie Kilborn (January 1907 – April 1909)
- Henry Hodgkin (May 1909 – January 1910)
- Joseph Taylor (1910–1912, 1917–1922, 1925–1929, 1934–1936)
- James Livingstone Stewart (1912–1917, 1922–1925)
- Lewis Frederick Havermale (1929–1931)
- Frederick Boreham (1931–1934)
- Homer G. Brown (1936–1939)
- Albert French Lutley (1940–1943)

== See also ==
- Anglicanism in Sichuan
- Methodism in Sichuan
- Quakerism in Sichuan
- Baptist Christianity in Sichuan
- West China Union University
- Journal of the West China Border Research Society
