= St John's Cathedral, Langzhong =

- Gospel Church
- 聖約翰座堂
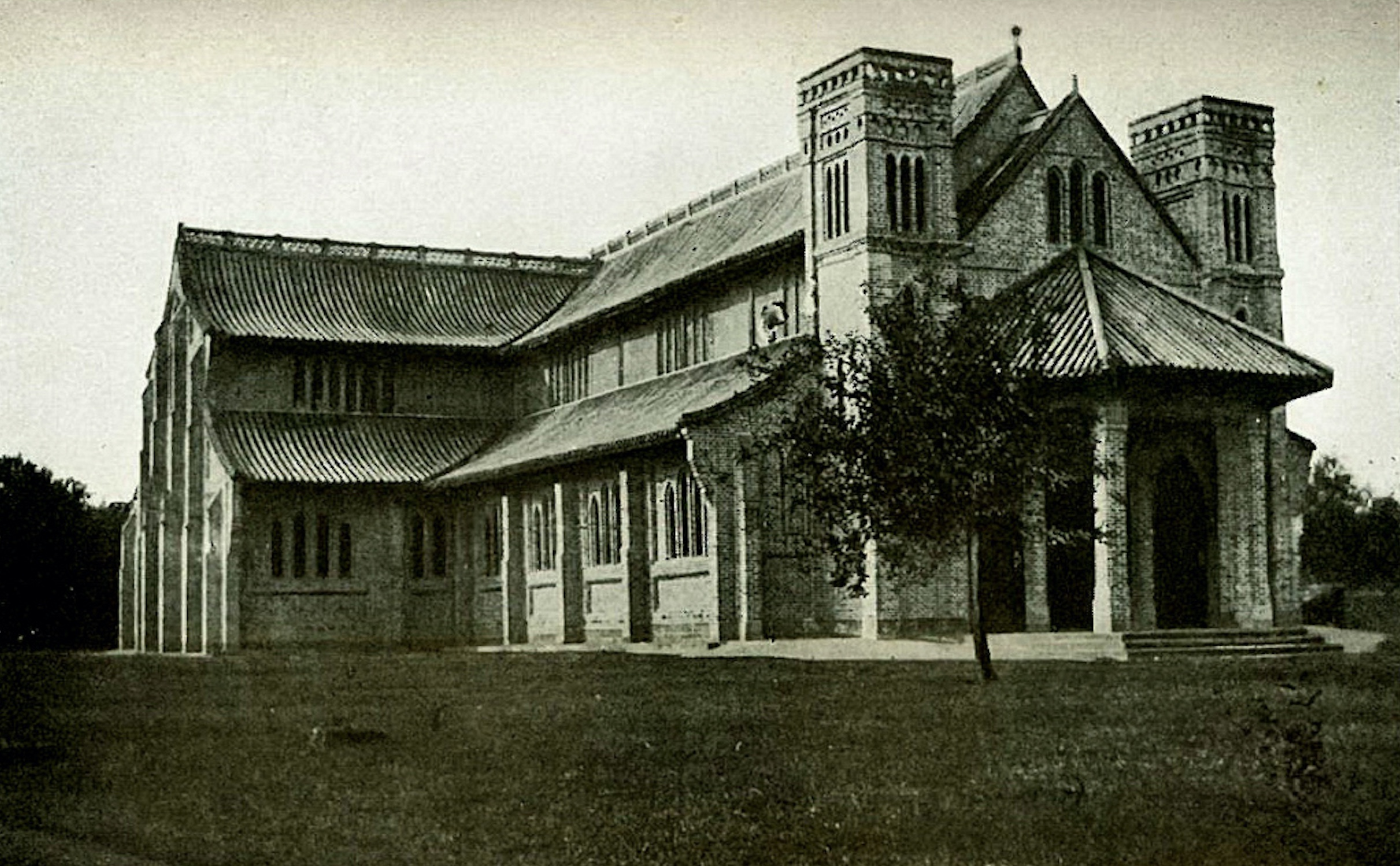
- St John's Cathedral, circa 1914.
- St John's Cathedral, Langzhong
- 31.58046°N 105.97155°E
- Location: 5 Yangtianjing Street, Langzhong, Sichuan
- Country: China
- Denomination: Three-Self Church (Protestant)
- Previous denomination: Church in China (under the jurisdiction of the Church of England)
- Churchmanship: Low church evangelical

History
- Status: Church prev. cathedral
- Founded: 1908
- Founder: William Cassels (China Inland Mission)
- Dedication: John the Evangelist

Architecture
- Functional status: Active
- Architect: George A. Rogers
- Style: Gothic Revival with traditional Sichuanese elements
- Groundbreaking: 1913
- Completed: 1914

Administration
- Province: China (formerly)
- Diocese: Szechwan (formerly); East Szechwan (formerly; since 1936)

St John's Cathedral, (Note: traditional Chinese: 聖約翰座堂; simplified Chinese: 圣约翰座堂; pinyin: Shèngyuēhàn zuòtáng; Wade–Giles: Shêng⁴-yüeh¹-han⁴ tso⁴-tʽang²; Sichuanese romanization: Shen^{4} Io^{5} Han^{4} Tso^{4} Tʽang^{2}.) today known as Gospel Church, (Note: Chinese: 福音堂; pinyin: Fúyīn táng; Sichuanese romanization: Fu^{5} In^{1} Tʽang^{2}.) is a Protestant church situated on Yangtianjing Street in the county-level city of Langzhong, Nanchong, Sichuan Province. Founded in 1908, the church had been the Anglican cathedral, originally designated as a pro-cathedral, of the Szechwan Diocese (and later of East Szechwan) of the Church in China, and the largest Anglican church in Southwest China. It has been subjected to the control of the state-sanctioned Three-Self Patriotic Church since 1954.

== History ==
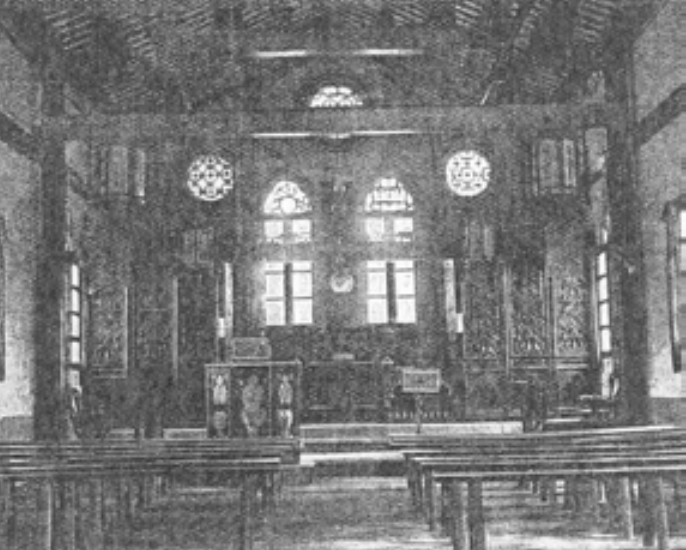
Interior of St John's Cathedral, 1910s.

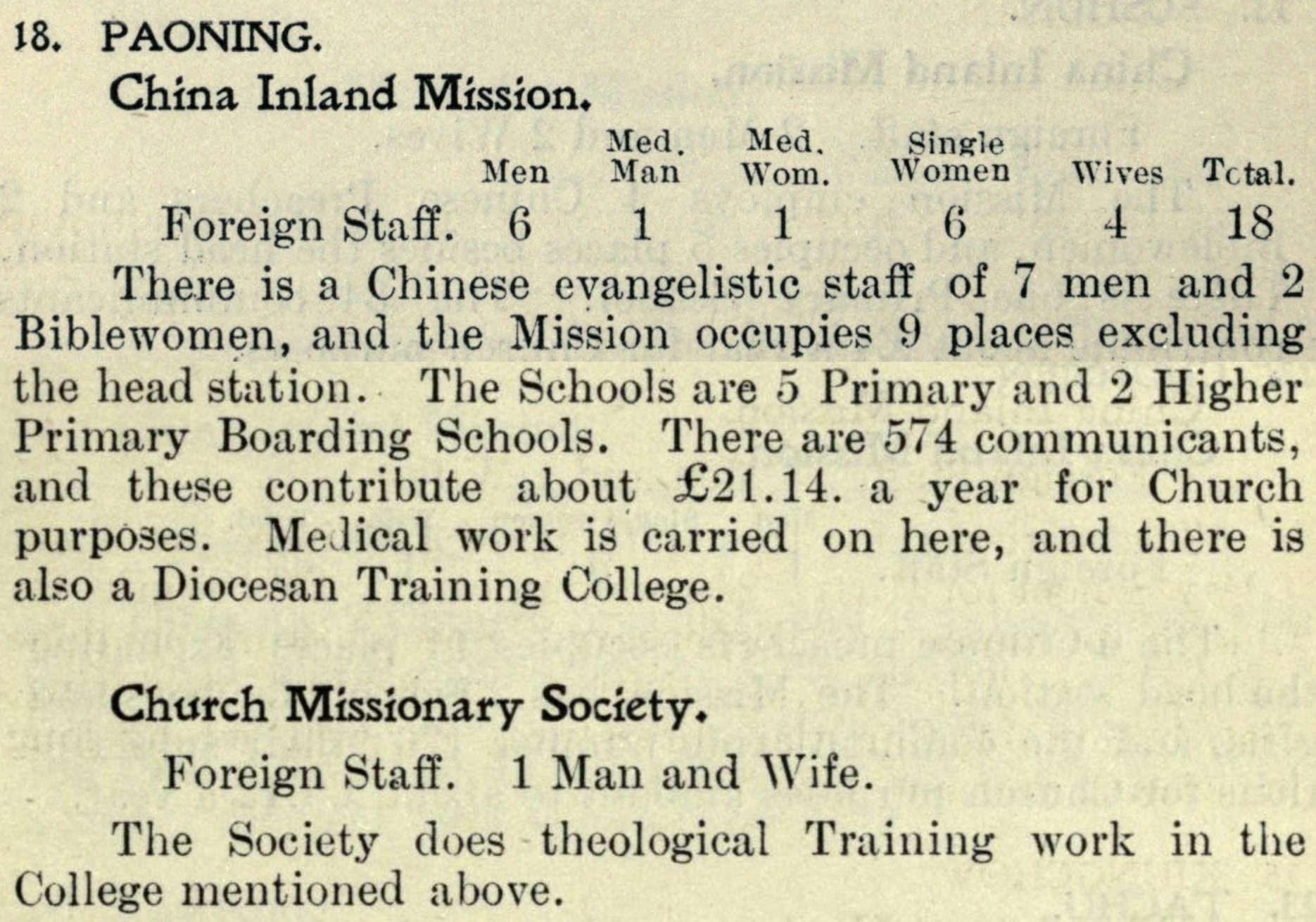
Survey of the mission work of China Inland Mission and Church Missionary Society in Paoning, published in 1913.

The first Anglican church in Langzhong (then known as Langchung, Paoning or Paoning Foo [Baoning / Baoning Fu]), the Trinity Church, built in 1893, had become too small as the number of converts had increased.

After a series of problems, St John's was eventually built on Yangtianjing Street, under the supervision of William Cassels, one of the Cambridge Seven, and the then missionary bishop in the Diocese of Western China. Construction began in 1913 and finished in 1914.

The cathedral was designed by the Australian architect George A. Rogers, and built in the fusion of neo-Gothic and traditional Sichuanese architectural styles. It occupies an area of nearly 4000 square metres, with a cemetery, a library, a well, a flower garden and a vegetable garden. Cassels died in 1925 and buried in the garden of St John's. Montagu Proctor-Beauchamp, also one of the Cambridge Seven, was buried in the cemetery of the cathedral in 1939.

After the communist takeover of China in 1949, Christian Churches in China were forced to sever their ties with respective overseas Churches, which has thus led to the merging of St John's into the communist-established Three-Self Patriotic Church.

== See also ==
- Anglicanism in Sichuan
- Category:Former Anglican church buildings in Sichuan
- St John's Church, Chengdu – former cathedral of West Szechwan
