= Song Cheng-tsi =

- Bishop of West Szechwan
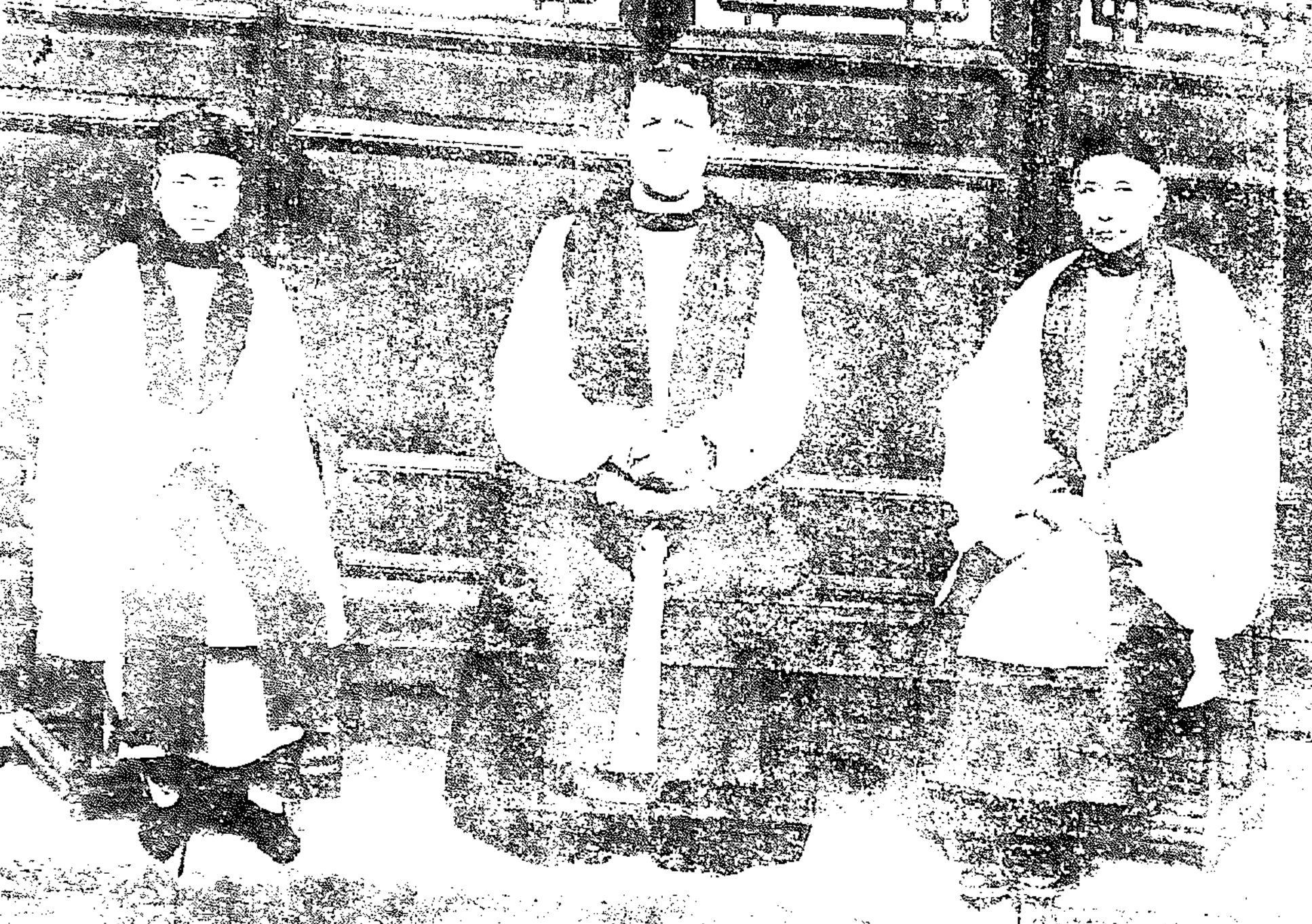
- Bishop C. T. Song (left) with Howard Mowll (middle) and Ku Ho-lin, 1929.
- Church: Church in China
- Diocese: West Szechwan
- Installed: 1937
- Term ended: 1950
- Predecessor: John Holden
- Other post: Assistant Bishop of Western China (1929–1936)

Personal details
- Born: 1890 Sichuan, Qing Empire
- Died: 1955 (aged 64–65)
- Denomination: Anglican
- Education: West China Union University; Wycliffe Hall, Oxford; Ridley Hall, Cambridge

Song Cheng-tsi (Note: Chinese: 宋誠之; pinyin: Sòng Chéngzhī; Wade–Giles: Sung Chʽêng-chih; Sichuanese romanization: Song Chʽen-chï.) (1890–1955), also known as Song Chen-tze, Chʻeng-Tsi Song, C. T. Song or C. T. Sung, was a bishop of the Sichuanese Anglican Church.

== Biography ==
Song was born in Sichuan (formerly romanized as Szechwan) in 1890, a mentee of James Stewart and baptised by Reg Taylor in 1916 after family hostility to his conversion had died down. He attended West China Union University in 1917, where he majored in English language and literature. After graduation from the Union University, he studied theology at Wycliffe Hall, Oxford and Ridley Hall, Cambridge before being ordained in 1927. He was consecrated an Assistant Bishop of Western China in St Thomas' Church, Mianzhu, on 29 June 1929 and Bishop of West Szechwan in 1937. He was also a visiting professor in Religious Studies at West China Union University. He visited Hong Kong in 1943 at the invitation of Bishop R. O. Hall. He was also invited by Archbishop Mowll to visit Australia, where he spoke at civic events, universities, and theological colleges. As an example of ecumenism, he collaborated with Roman Catholic scholars in translating some works by Church Fathers into Chinese. He was regarded by Bishop R. O. Hall as the "outstanding Szechwanese leader". He died from a stroke in 1955.

== See also ==
- Protestantism in Sichuan
- The West China Missionary News
