= History of Anglicanism in Sichuan =

History and status of the Anglican Church in Sichuan

Anglican Church in Sichuan
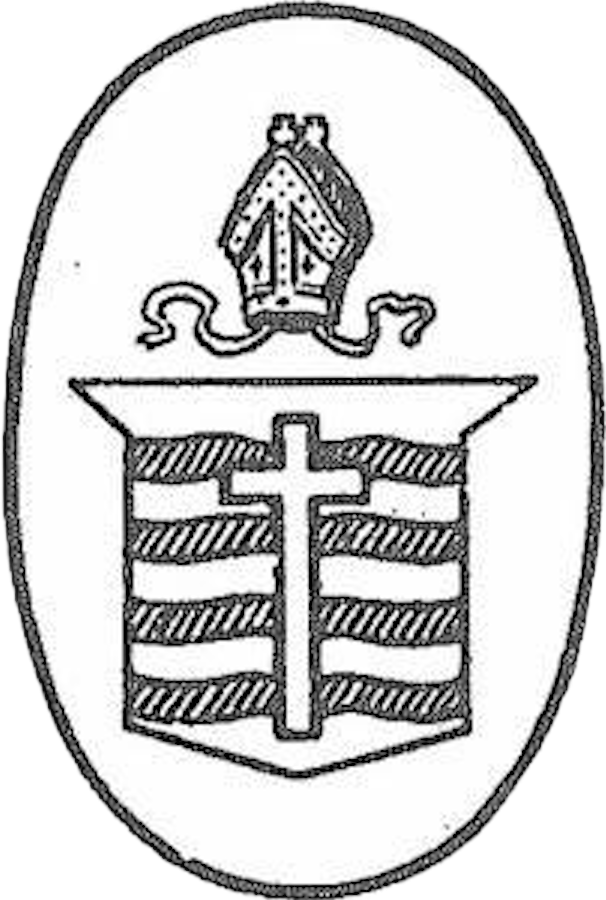
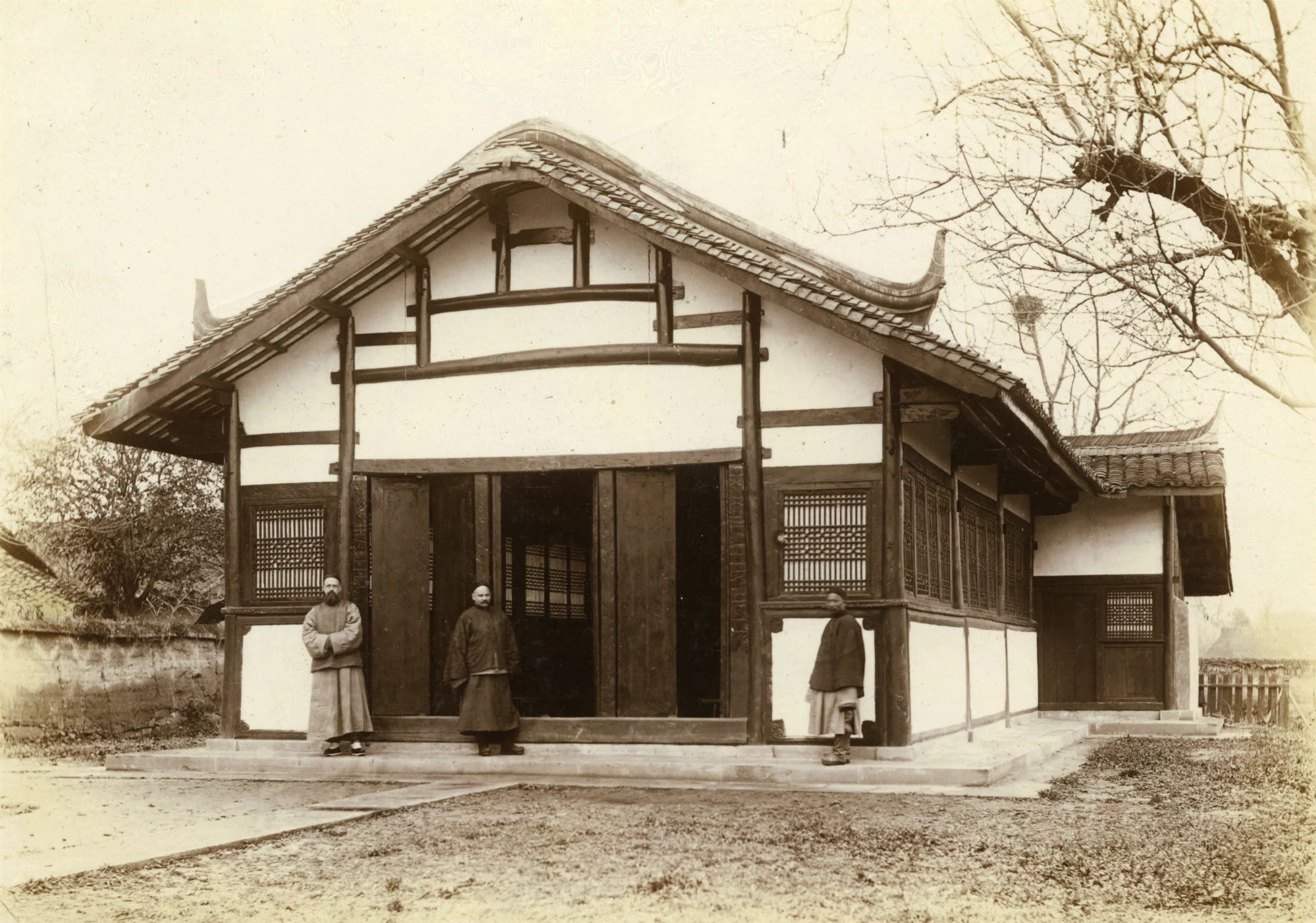
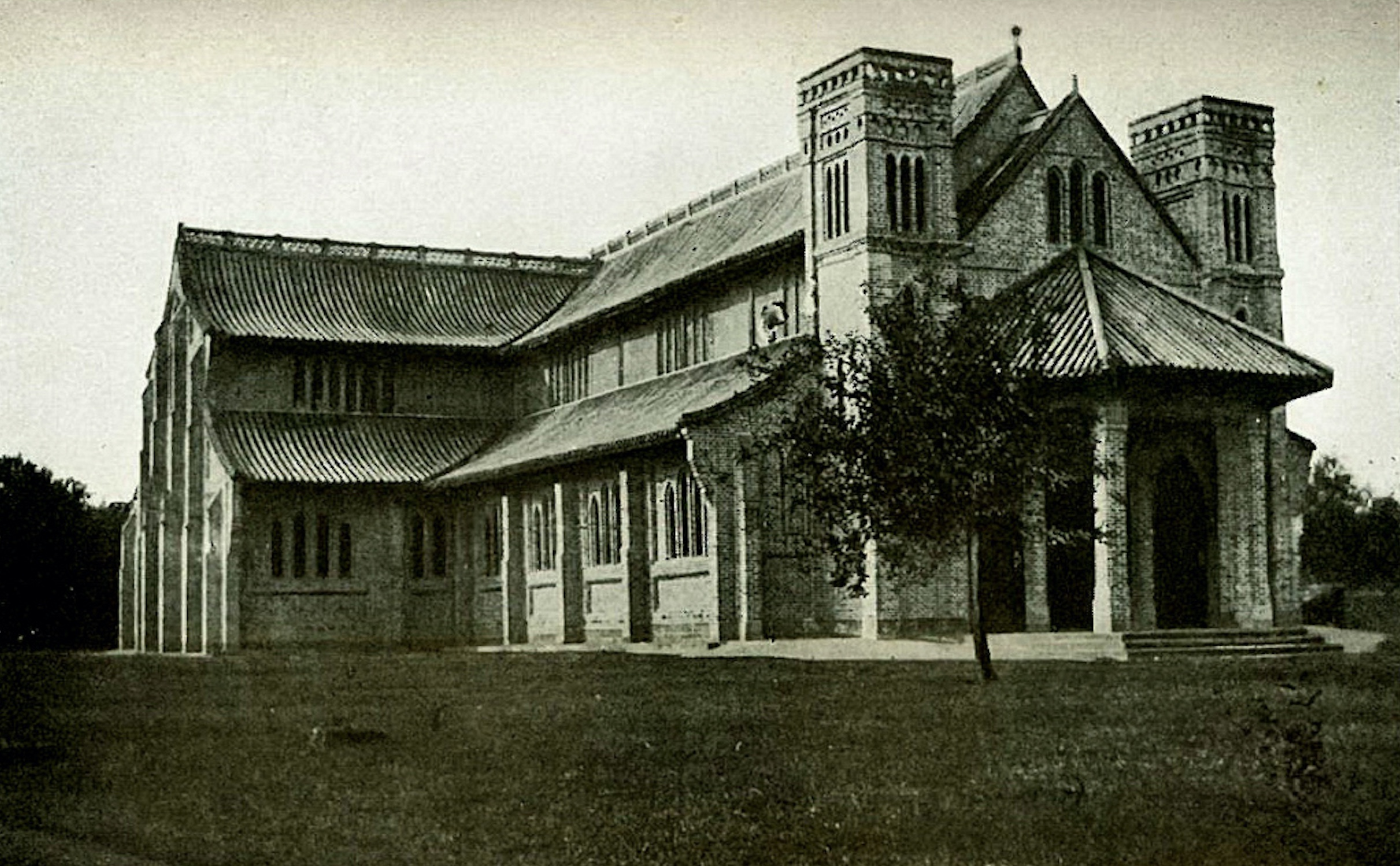
- Clockwise from upper left: seal of the Diocese of Szechwan; Trinity Church, Langzhong (formerly known as Paoning; first Anglican church built in Sichuan); St John's Cathedral, Langzhong.
- Classification: Protestant
- Orientation: Anglican
- Scripture: Protestant Bible
- Theology: Anglican doctrine
- Polity: Episcopal
- Bishop of East Szechwan: last: Tsai Fuh-tsu
- Bishop of West Szechwan: last: Song Cheng-tsi
- Region: Sichuan and Chongqing
- Language: Sichuanese, English
- Headquarters: East Szechwan: Langzhong; West Szechwan: Chengdu
- Founder: William Cassels, James Heywood Horsburgh et al.
- Origin: 1887 (139 years ago); Langzhong, Sichuan, Qing Empire
- Branched from: Church of England
- Merged into: Chinese Three-Self Patriotic Church
- Defunct: 1954
- Members: 10,000+ (1926)

The history of Anglicanism in Sichuan (or "Western China") (Note: Sichuan, formerly romanized as Szechwan, Szechuan, or Ssuchʻuan; also referred to as "West China" or "Western China".) began in 1887 when Anglican missionaries working with the China Inland Mission began to arrive from the United Kingdom. These were later joined by missionaries from the Church Missionary Society and Bible Churchmen's Missionary Society. Or according to Annals of Religion in Mianyang, in 1885, a small mission church was already founded in Mianyang by Alfred Arthur Phillips and Gertrude Emma Wells of the Church Missionary Society. Missionaries built churches, founded schools, and distributed Chinese translations of Anglican religious texts. These efforts were relatively successful and Anglicanism grew to become one of the two largest denominations of Protestant Christianity in the province, alongside Methodism.

Nonetheless, missionary activity in China generated controversy among many native Chinese and faced armed opposition during both the Boxer Rebellion and the later Chinese Communist Revolution. Although the former did not affect Sichuan so much as some other parts of China, the province was one of the hotbeds of anti-missionary riots throughout its ecclesiastical history.

Numerous mission properties and native church leaders in Sichuan were respectively destroyed and killed by communists in the mid-1930s. After the communist take over of China in 1949, missionaries were expelled and activity ceased. Under government oppression in the 1950s, Anglicans and other Protestants across China severed their ties with overseas churches and their congregations merged into the Three-Self Patriotic Church. Since 1980, services for Chinese Protestant churches have been provided by the China Christian Council.

== History ==
=== First Anglican missionaries ===
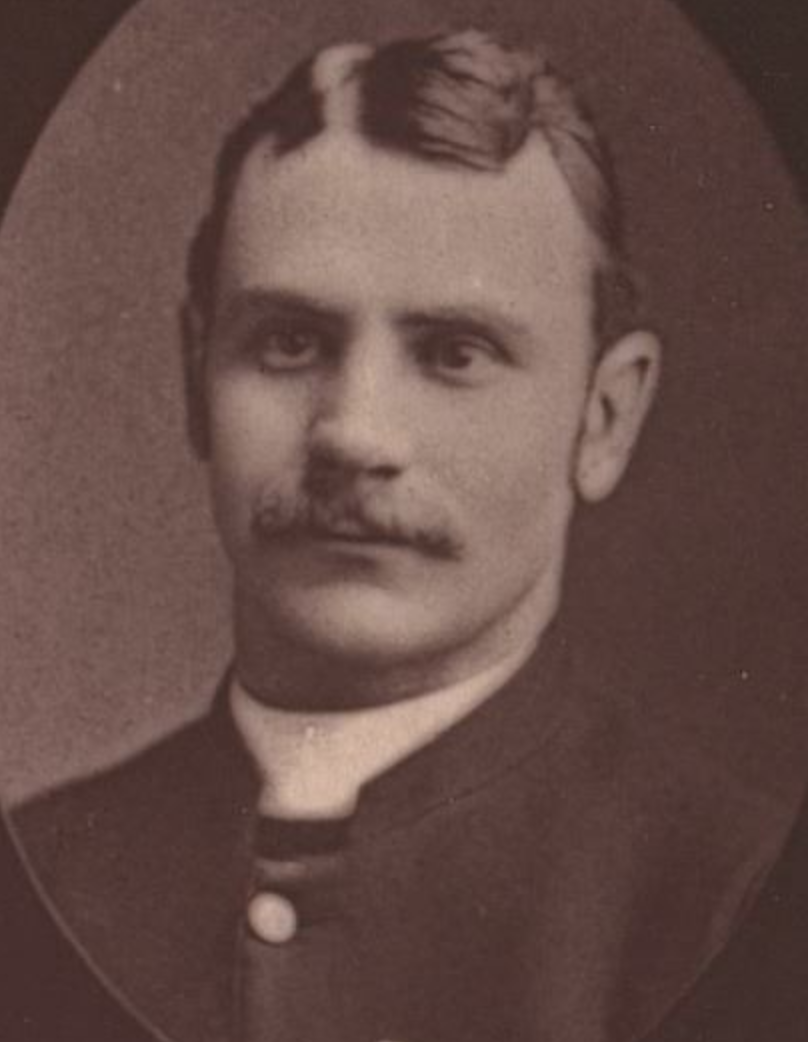
William Cassels

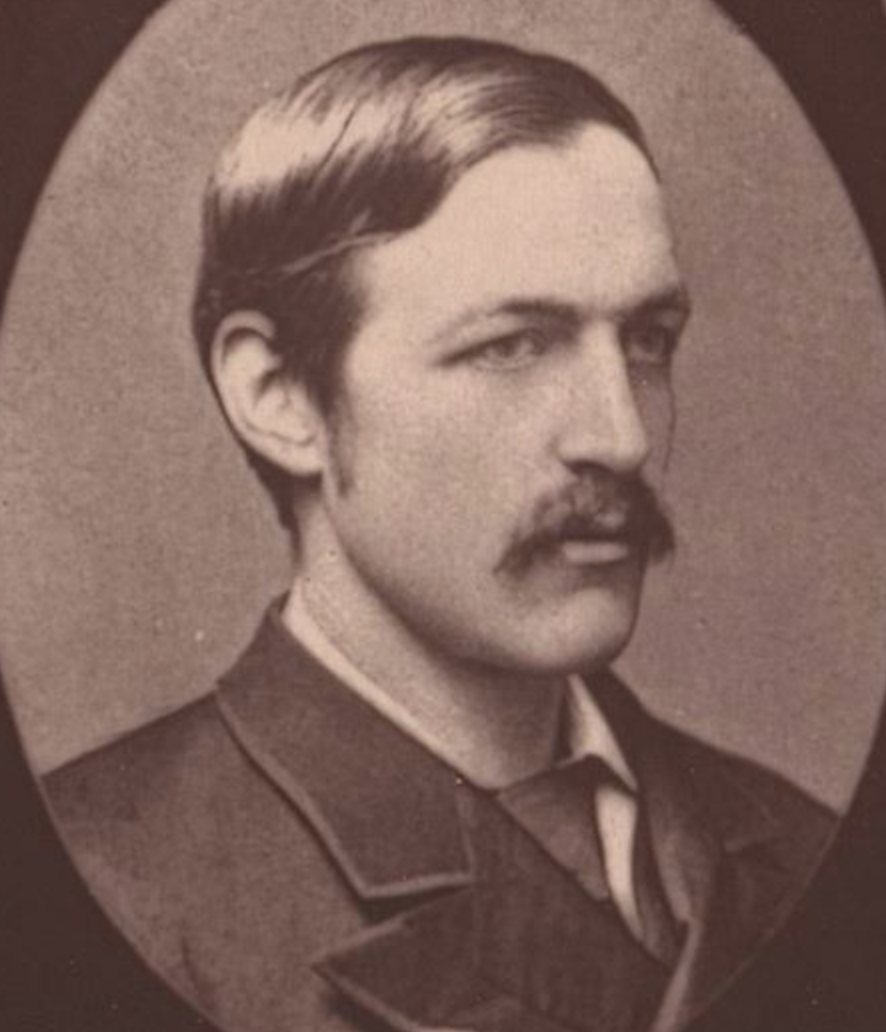
Montagu Proctor-Beauchamp

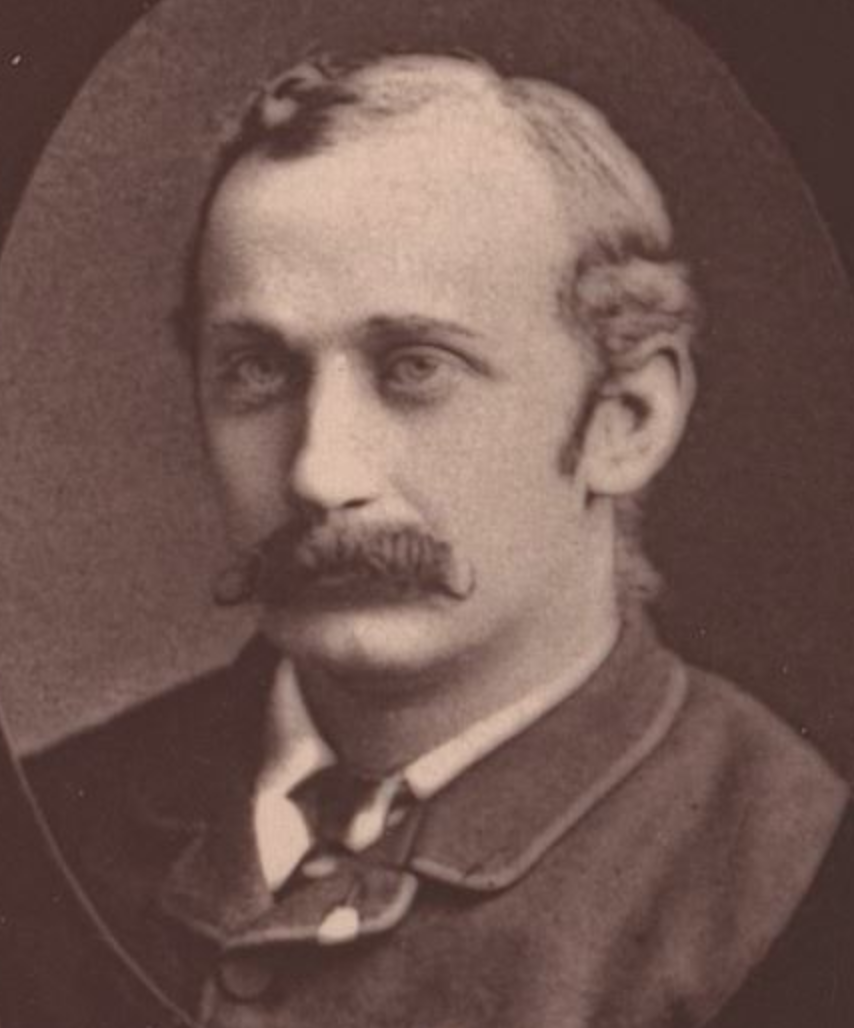
Arthur T. Polhill-Turner

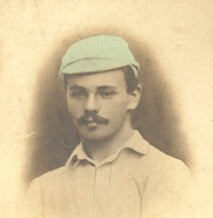
Cecil H. Polhill-Turner

The first Anglican missionaries to Sichuan through the China Inland Mission

The Cambridge Seven were Anglicans serving under the interdenominational society China Inland Mission (CIM). Four of them were going to be the first Anglican missionaries working in the western province of Sichuan. William Cassels, was already an ordained priest; Arthur T. Polhill-Turner, was studying for holy orders when he volunteered for the mission in China; Montagu Proctor-Beauchamp, a baronet from the Proctor-Beauchamp family; and Arthur's elder brother Cecil H. Polhill-Turner, a Pentecostal revivalist. They left London for China on 5 February 1885. After studying the local language, the four were transferred to Sichuan in 1887. Cassels held the licence of George Moule, Bishop of Mid-China, as the Western China district fell within the Mid-China jurisdiction by the time. Arthur was before long ordained both deacon and priest by the same Bishop. Cecil was first based at the capital Chengdu (Chengtu) and the eastern Sichuanese city Chongqing (Chungking), but he felt drawn towards the people of Tibet. After helping with mission work in Kalimpong in India in 1896, he moved to Dajianlu (Tatsienlu), a Khams Tibetan city of western Sichuan. From there he had laboured on the Sino- and Indo-Tibetan borders since then.

In 1893, Trinity Church was built in Baoning (Paoning) under Cassels's supervision. As the first Anglican church in Sichuan, the chosen style was in consideration of being more acceptable to the locals. It adopted the style of traditional residential buildings in northern Sichuan, fully blended into the surroundings. The British explorer Isabella Bird described in her book The Yangtze Valley and Beyond, that the church "is Chinese in style, the chancel windows are 'glazed' with coloured paper to simulate stained glass, and it is seated for two hundred. [...] The church was crammed at matins, and crowds stood outside, where they could both see and hear, this publicity contrasting with the Roman practice."

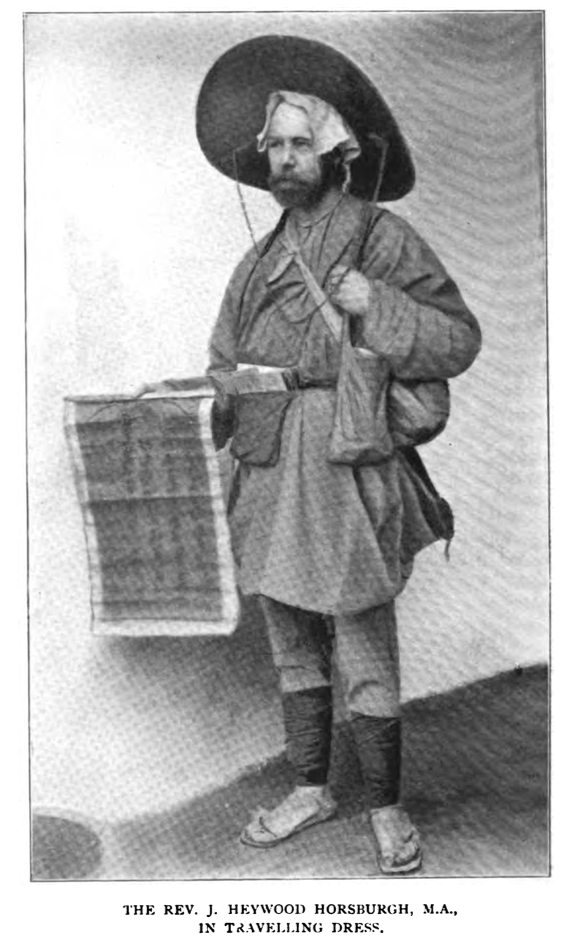
Rev. James Heywood Horsburgh in local travelling dress. Horsburgh was the first Anglican missionary to travel to Sichuan through the Church Missionary Society.

At the close of 1891, the Rev. James Heywood Horsburgh of Church Missionary Society (CMS, belonging to the Church of England), along with his wife Mrs Horsburgh, the Rev. O. M. Jackson, three laymen, and six single women missionaries, entered Sichuan as the first band of CMS missionaries to take up work in that province. By an amicable arrangement with the CIM, the northern part of the province was divided into two districts. The district lies mainly to the north of the capital Chengdu was occupied by the CMS, while the CIM's Church of England district was to the east of that of the CMS.

When Horsburgh's party first arrived, they were unable to secure or rent any houses in the principal towns of what was to be the occupied area of their future mission; and they dwelt at first with their fellow-workers of the CIM. It did not take them long, however, to begin itinerant work, staying for days or weeks at local inns, such brief stays not at all fruitless. Among the leaders of this group was an exceptionally gifted woman, Alice Entwistle, who was largely responsible for the opening of the important town of Mianzhou (Miencheo), which later became the headquarters of the CMS Mission.

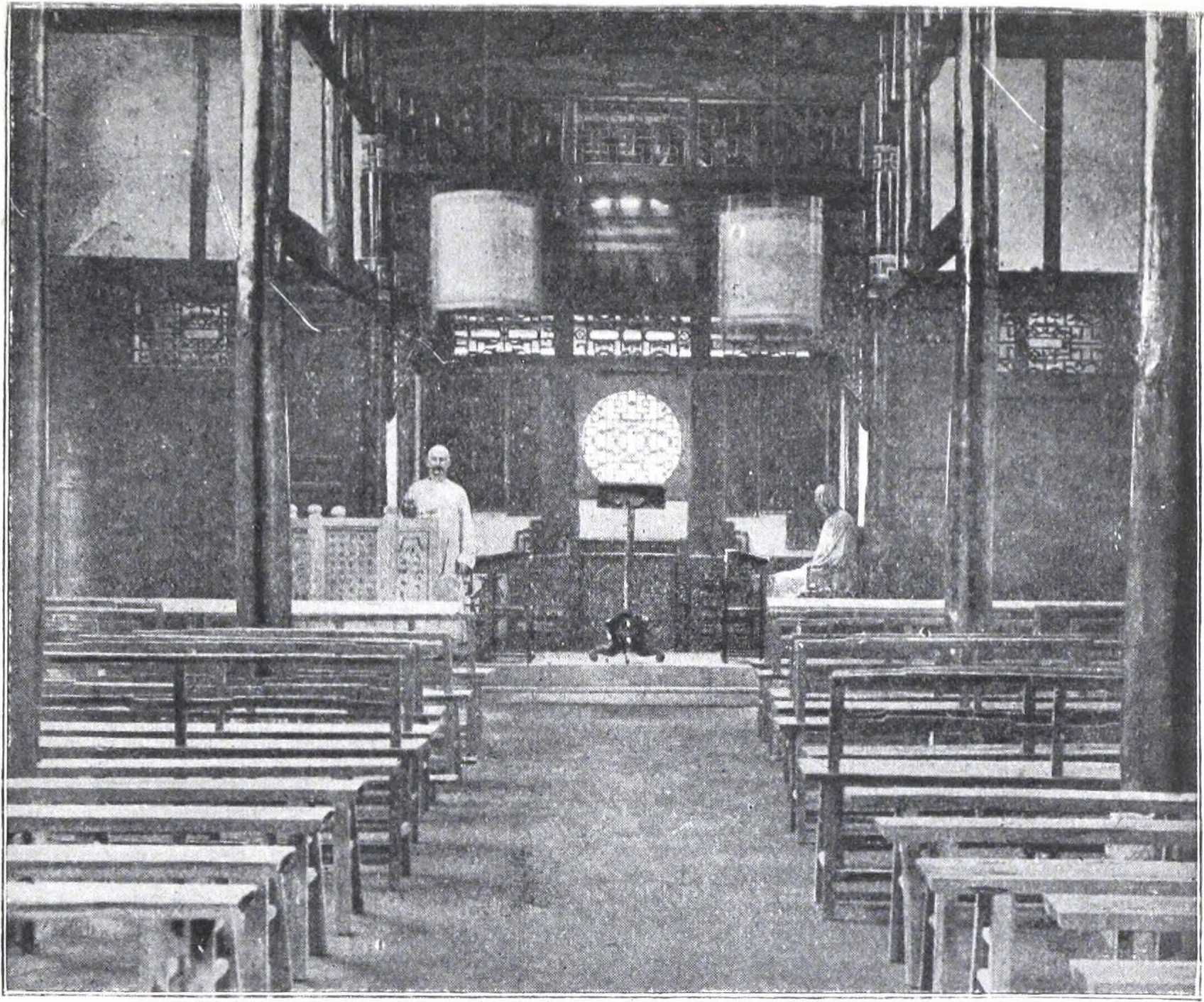
Interior of Bazhou (Pa-cheo) Church, where Arthur Polhill stationed; photograph by Montagu Proctor-Beauchamp, before 1901.

By 1894, CMS work had started in Mianzhou (Mienchow), Jiangyou (Chungpa), An County (Anhsien), Mianzhu (Mienchu) and Xindu (Sintu); the first CMS church was founded in Jiangyou in 1894. By 1908, CMS alone claimed eight stations in an area of approximately one hundred and fifty square miles, all of which were in the northwest of the province. Meanwhile, the CIM workers, based in Baoning, were also breaking ground in northeast Sichuan. Arthur Polhill spent ten years (1888–1898) in Bazhou doing evangelism. In 1899 he moved to Dazhou (Suiting), where he built a large multi-purpose Gospel Hall in 1904. A number of outstations were established following the building's completion.

At that time, Sichuan was the landlocked, westernmost province of China, bordering Tibet. It was quite isolated, compared with those coastal provinces in east China. The missionaries scattered, and the persistent state of turmoil of the countryside with war, banditry and general unrest made the work difficult and dangerous.

Prior to 1895, CMS mission in Sichuan had been under the direction of George Moule, the Bishop of Mid-China, but it was quite impossible for him to give adequate supervision to a region nearly 2,000 miles away from his headquarters, and it was therefore decided to create a new Diocese of Western China (a.k.a. Diocese of Szechwan). With the approval of the Archbishop of Canterbury (Edward White Benson) and the CMS, Cassels was consecrated bishop on St. Luke's Day, 18 October 1895, at Westminster Abbey.

That same year was marked by a serious outbreak of anti-foreign agitation which spread throughout the province. In the capital Chengdu, the property of three Protestant missions and that of the Roman Catholics was destroyed, and in other towns the work of the CMS stations was temporarily disrupted. The missionaries, however, were able to remain at their posts, and despite opposition and occasional waves of intense anti-foreign sentiment, the work continued to go forward until the Boxer Rebellion in 1900. This unrest did not affect Sichuan so much as some other parts of China, nevertheless missionaries were obliged by consular orders to retire to the coast. During their absence, the local converts defended their faith and carried on all the regular services.

=== 20th century ===
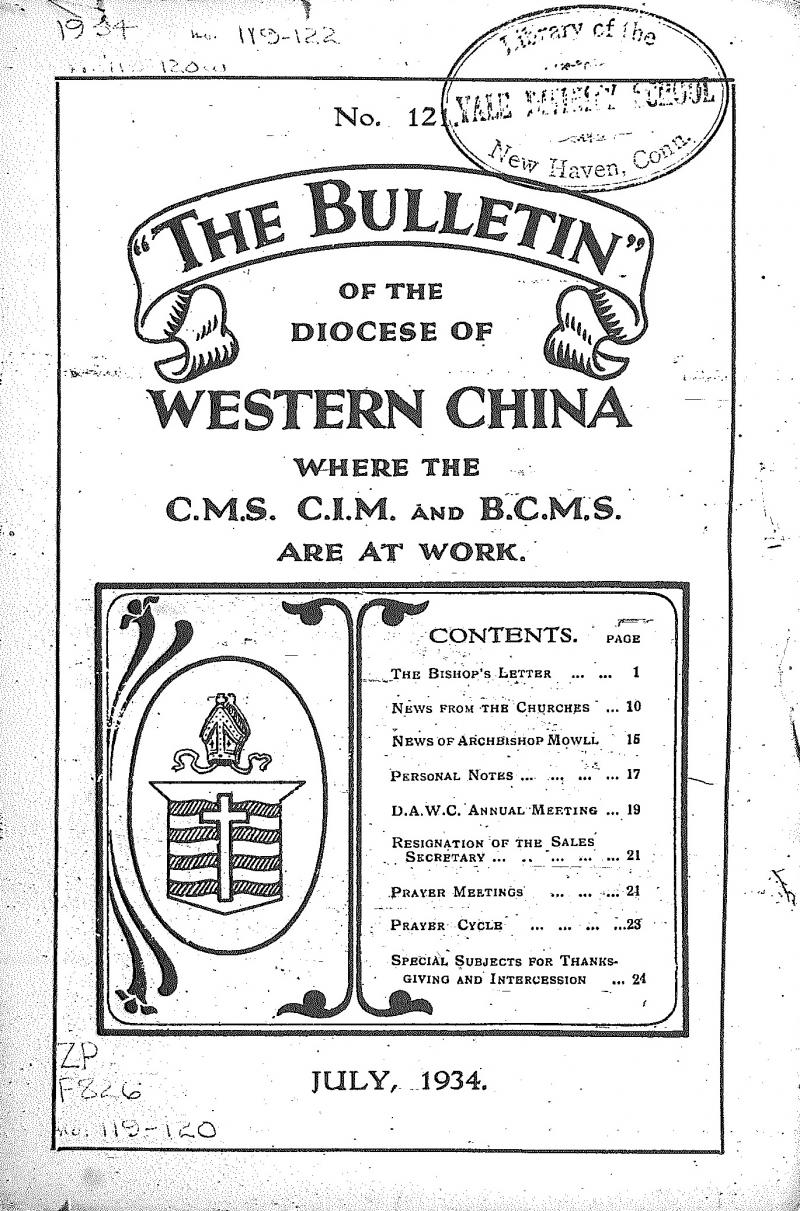
The Bulletin of the Diocese of Western China, founded in 1904.

Following the establishment of the Diocese of Western China and the increasing number of converts, the Trinity Church had become too small. Construction of a neo-Gothic pro-cathedral began in 1913 under the supervision of the Australian architect George A. Rogers. Upon the completion of the construction, Cassels invited the Bishop of Hankow, Logan H. Roots, to come and preach a series of sermons in connection with the opening of the pro-cathedral. This caused some dissension among the foreign staff. As staunch evangelicals, they were upset by the idea of something to be called a cathedral. Two of the women missionaries were particularly upset by the presence of two bishops in their convocation robes, standing posture at the offertory, and flowers in two handsome vases placed within the chancel rails. They found vent in other spheres of work. In addition, the diocese founded its official newsletter, The Bulletin of the Diocese of Western China, in 1904. It was renamed several times during its 54-year run, with the last print published in 1958.

The growing maturity of the Sichuanese Church was seen in Cassels's appointment of Ku Ho-lin as archdeacon in 1918. Ku was remarkable as a convert from Islam, and had been one of those who held the Church together when foreign staff had to leave during the Boxer Rebellion. Overseeing the greatly increased number of congregations was becoming too much for Cassels alone. As early as 1915, he raised with the Archbishop of Canterbury (Randall Davidson) the question of the division of the diocese. It did not seem advisable at the time, but relief was given by the appointments of an archdeacon and of Howard Mowll as assistant bishop in 1922, who was particularly in charge of the CMS district. Cassels welcomed the Bible Churchmen's Missionary Society (BCMS, seceded from the CMS in 1922) field workers when they approached him, as he had welcomed Rev. Horsburgh and his party many years before. He wrote: "With regard to the BCMS coming into the diocese, I must say I am most thankful to think that there is some prospect of them taking up the work in the Kwangan, Yochih and Linshui region, which is now left without any oversight."

In 1921, members of fanatical bands self-denominated "Divine Soldiers", killed six or seven Christians in Wan County, eastern Sichuan. The province was also affected by the widespread Anti-Christian Movement in the 1920s, which had its origins in the east and north parts of China, such as Shanghai and Beijing.

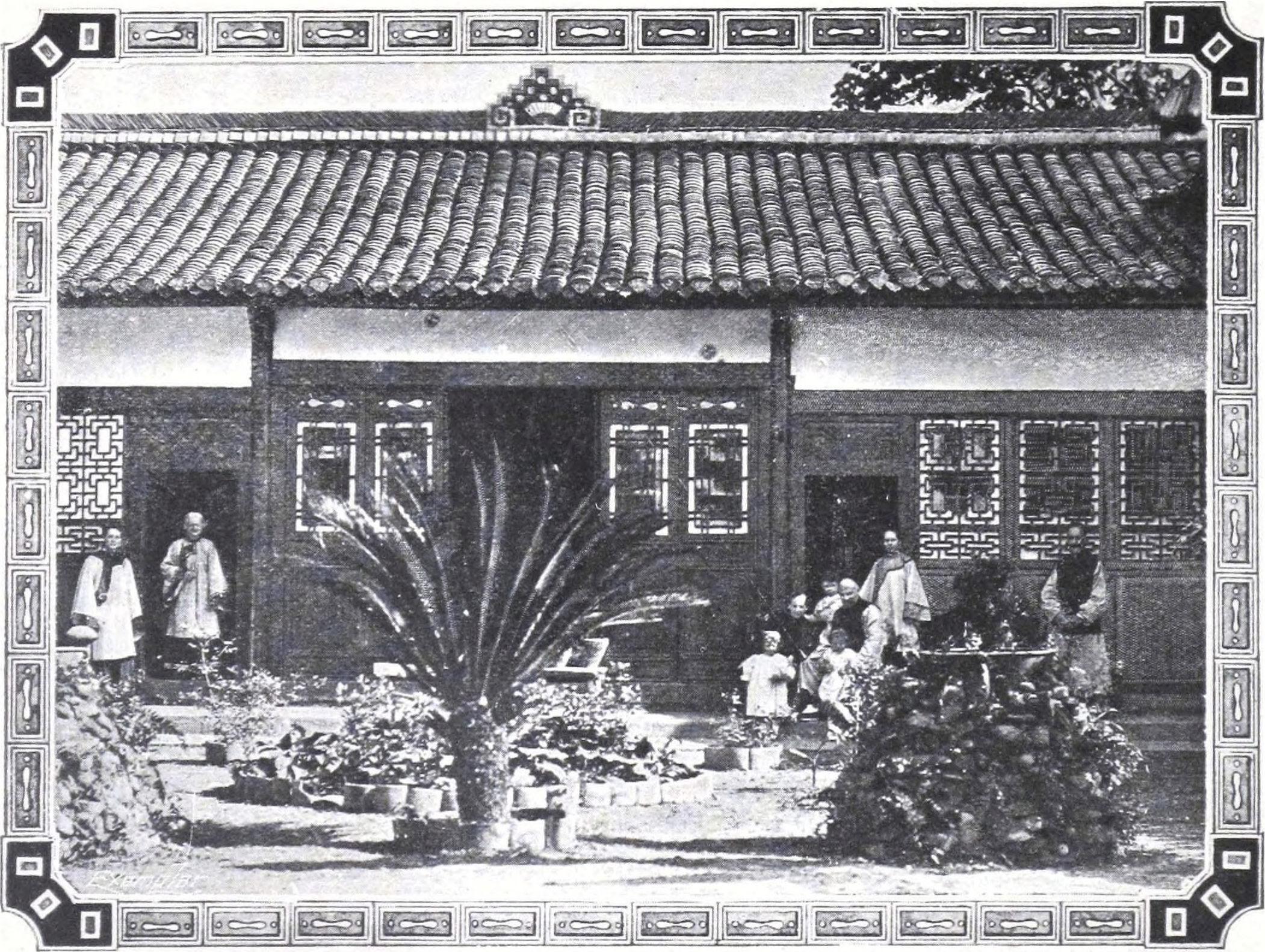
Bishop Cassels, his wife Mary Louisa Cassels (née Legg) and family, and other missionary workers at their mission home in Baoning; before 1901.

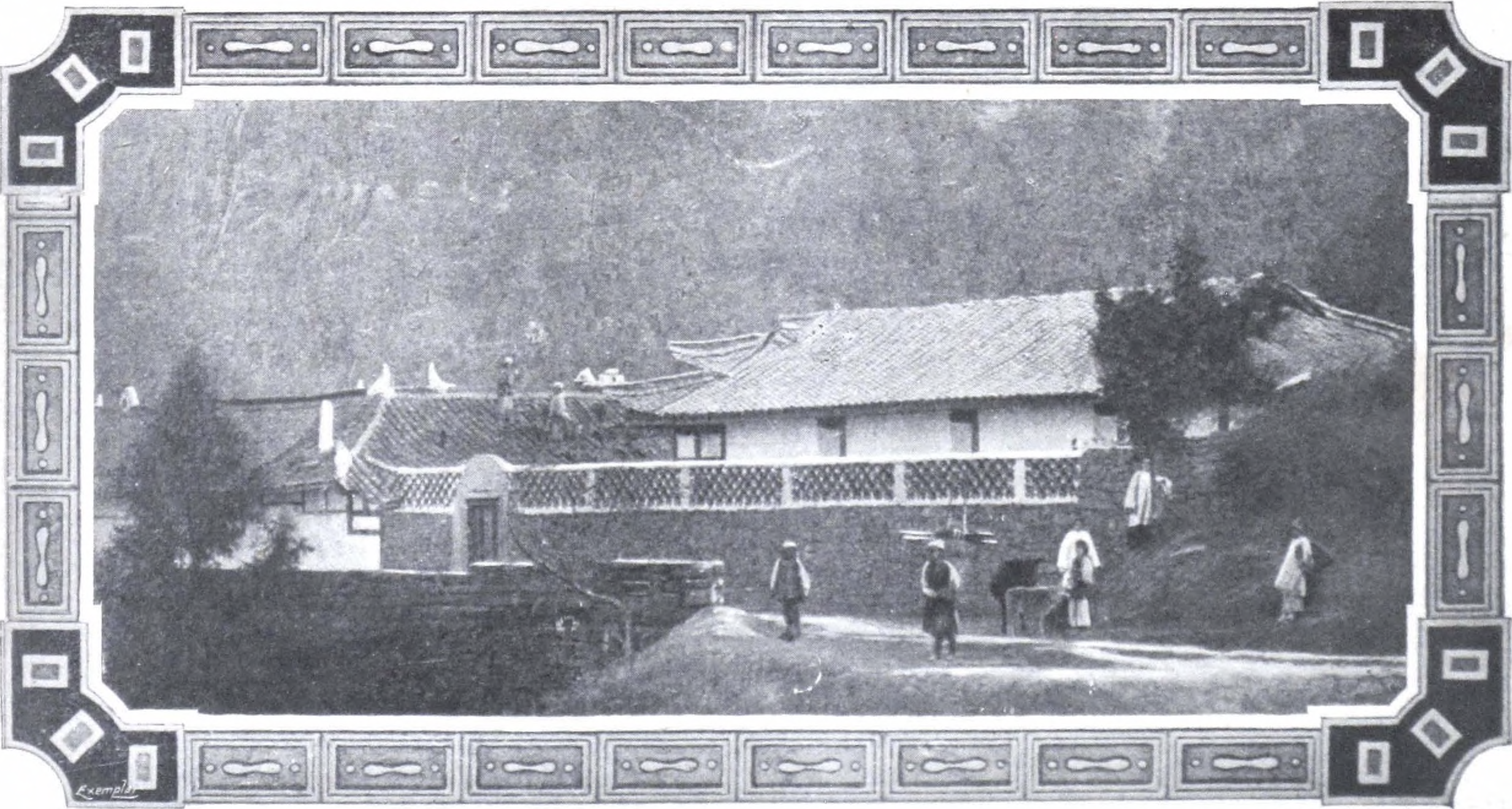
Xindianzi mission house, seen from the road; before 1901.

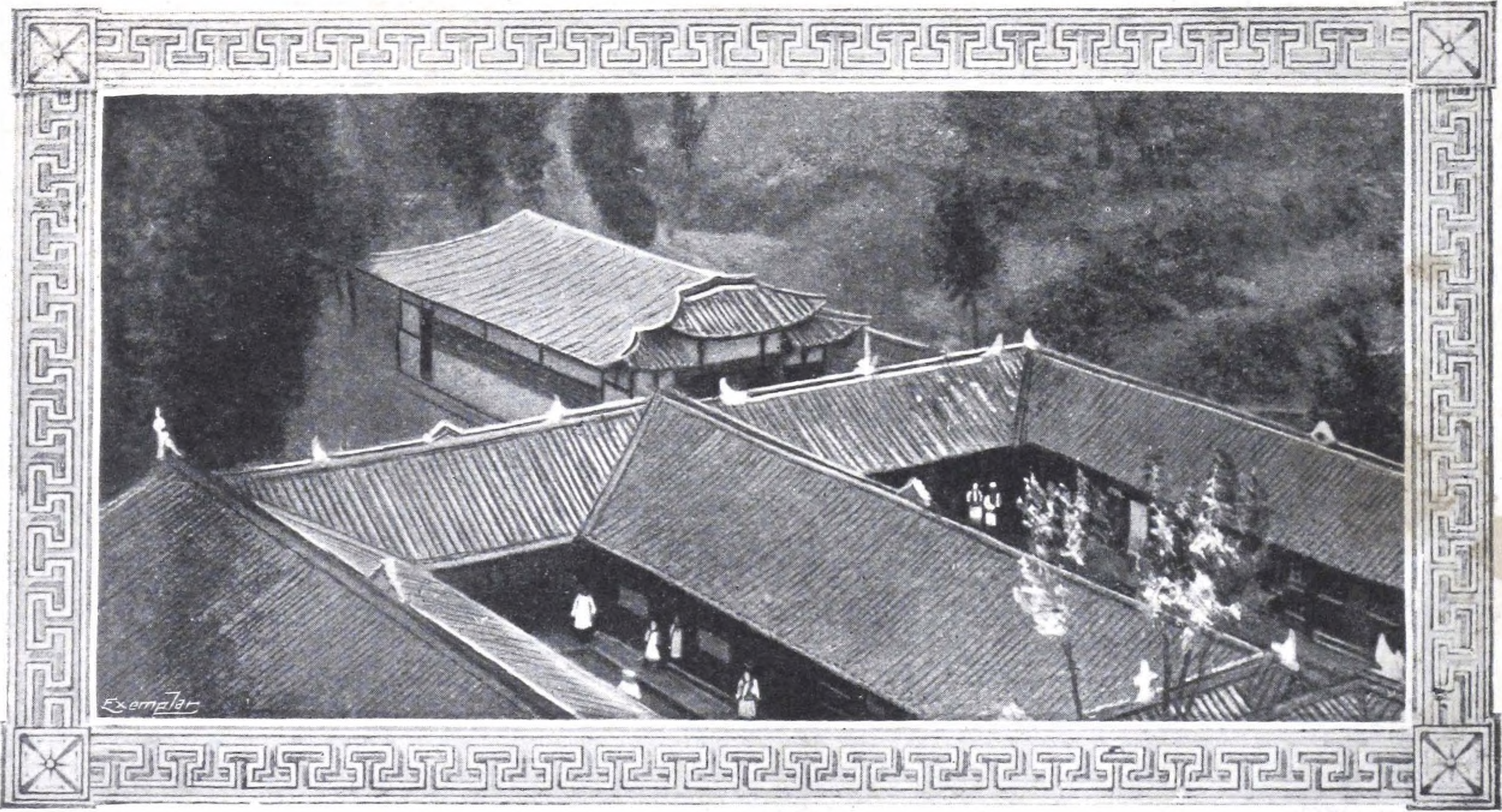
Xindianzi mission house and chapel (built 1898), as seen from the hill; before 1901.

Bishop Cassels died on 7 November 1925. He had served forty years in Sichuan, based at Langzhong (Baoning), thirty of these years as bishop, and was succeeded by Howard Mowll. It was largely the result of Cassels's work that Christianity in its Anglican form had become well established in eastern Sichuan. In 1885, there was no Christian congregation apart from Roman Catholics. In a letter written nearly forty years after his arrival in Sichuan, Cassels gave a brief account of the mission's achievements:

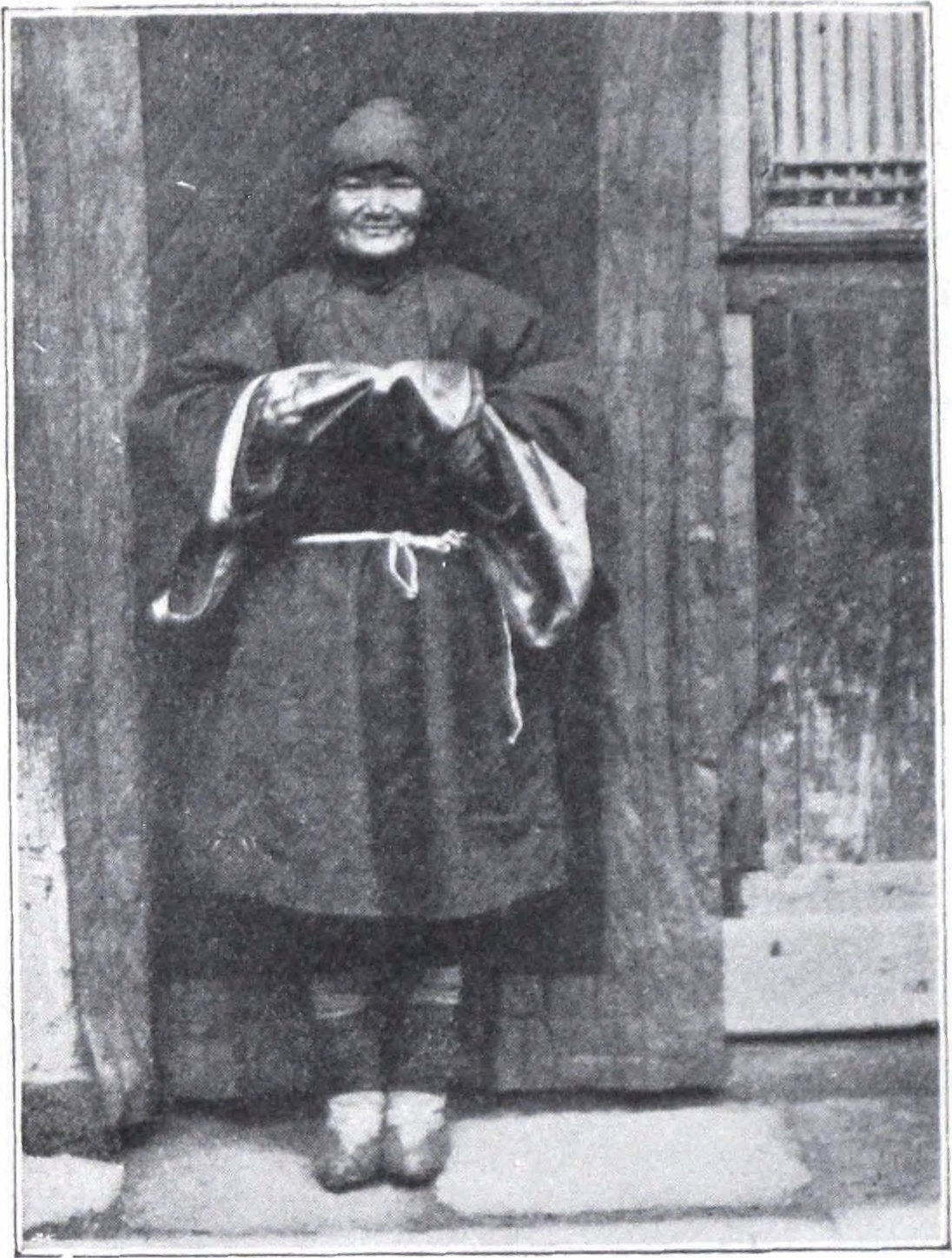
Mrs. Chao, the Bible-woman at Xindianzi (Sin-tien-tsï), near Baoning, a small mission station that had opened in 1892; before 1901.

When I came here nearly forty years ago, there was no Mission House or Church. Now there are twenty-five central stations and one hundred and twenty outstations, and some forty or fifty Churches have been built. Then there were no Christians nor even a catechumen of any kind. Now over 10,000 converts have been baptized, and of these 6700 odd have been confirmed; and the returns show that there are nearly 2500 baptized persons who have not yet been confirmed, as well as over 2000 catechumens, a proportion of whom will, it is hoped, be baptized before long. And as to Chinese workers, it is hardly necessary to say that there were none of any kind at all in those days. But now twelve tried men have been admitted to Holy Orders, of whom one has passed away and one has been made Archdeacon. There are also in the diocese ninety-eight licensed preachers, not including colporteurs, Bible-women and others.

I must not stay to allude in detail to the Schools for boys and girls, the Hospitals, the Hostel at Chengtu, the Training College (an institution of the greatest value), nor to the Cathedral, which have all come into being since the formation of the diocese.

For what has been done I give most humble and hearty thanks to God on high.

And it is the devoted band of my dear fellow-labourers, both missionary and Chinese, that God has used as His instruments during these forty years, and particularly during the thirty years since the formation of the diocese.

But whilst praising God for what He has done, we need to remind ourselves and you that this is but a drop in the bucket to the work which lies before us.

The mission work mostly concentrated on evangelisation in villages and towns, instead of big institutions and schools. There was, however, a Church hospital at Langzhong. For a time there was also a girls' school, a small theological college and a preacher's training school. The Langzhong Hospital was for a long time the only hospital in northeast Sichuan. Hospitals were also maintained at Dazhou and Liangshan. In Eastern Sichuan district, the aid came from the CIM and later from the BCMS; in Western Sichuan district the CMS. Anglicanism was much less widespread in the latter district than in the former, although it did extend to Songpan and Mao County, practically in the Qiang and Tibetan region. A Church hospital was built at Mianzhu, western Sichuan, where Dr. John Howard Lechler had worked for thirty years since 1908. For a time, Montagu Robert Lawrence, T. E. Lawrence's elder brother, worked there as a locum during Lechler's absence.

In 1918, the CMS became a partner in the West China Union University created by four Protestant mission societies in 1910 in the capital. The Anglicans provided at different times several members of staff for the university, including Dr. H. G. Anderson, who was working at its College of Medicine and Dentistry. They also provided a hostel for students there. In 1923, during the Anti-Christian Movement, two English clergymen, F. J. Watt and R. A. Whiteside, were shot to death by brigands among the mountains between Mianzhu and Mao County. One of them was a teacher of a boys' boarding school at Mianzhou. A memorial stele was erected at the foot of the mountain where the two men were murdered.

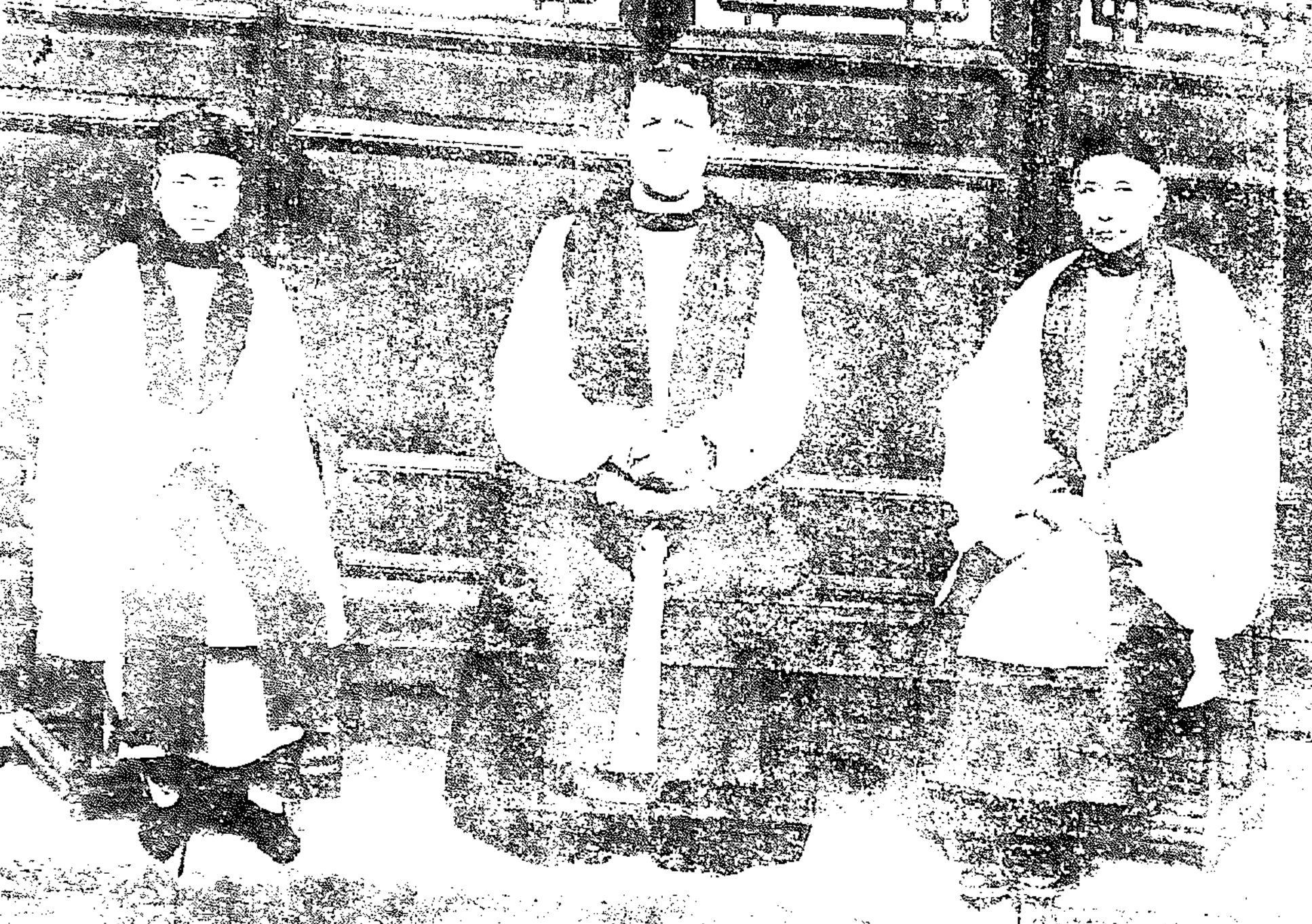
The three bishops of the Diocese of Szechwan in 1929, from left to right: Song Cheng-tsi, Howard Mowll and Ku Ho-lin.

In 1929, Bishop Mowll appointed two assistant bishops for the West China Diocese. Ku Ho-lin (a.k.a. Ku Shou-tsi) was entrusted with the northeast Sichuan district, which owed its origin to the Anglican section of the CIM; and Song Cheng-tsi with the west Sichuan district where the Church's connection was with the CMS. Ku's consecration took place on 16 June at the Cathedral of St. John the Evangelist in Langzhong. Brook Hannah, the assistant superintendent, served as litany reader during the ceremony. Song's consecration took place on 29 June at St. Thomas' Church in Mianzhu.

That same year (1929), an evangelical Anglican missionary, Vyvyan Donnithorne, was sent to Hanzhou by the CMS. He served as pastor at the local Gospel Church until 1949, before being transferred to the Canary Islands, Spain. During his stay in Hanzhou, he was appointed a member of the West China Border Research Society and a key figure in the discovery of the archaeological site now known as Sanxingdui.

A Chinese edition of the Book of Common Prayer (公禱書) for use in the Diocese of Szechwan, published in 1932.

A Chinese translation of the Book of Common Prayer was published in 1932, revised and authorized for use in the Diocese of Szechwan. In 1933, Bishop Mowll left to take up his new post as Archbishop of Sydney and John Holden was transferred from the Diocese of Kwangsi-Hunan to succeed him.

The middle 1930s was an extremely difficult period for the Church in Sichuan. The communist armies retreated through Sichuan to Shaanxi as they were driven out of Jiangxi by the Nationalist armies, later known as the Long March. Church workers had no choice but to temporarily leave their mission centres due to widespread lawlessness and banditry along the armies' retreat routes. Churches, chapels, schools, pastor's homes at Lifan, Zagunao (Tzagulao), and the church property of the CMS at Mao County (Maochow) were entirely destroyed by communist troops. During this period, Bishop Holden made considerable advances in transferring authority and responsibility to the locals that were still almost held exclusively by the CMS mission conference by the 1930s.

In 1936, the Diocese of Western China was split into Diocese of East Szechwan and Diocese of West Szechwan. Holden continued as bishop of the new Diocese of West Szechwan until being forced to return to England because of ill-health the following year. He was succeeded by Song Cheng-tsi. Frank Houghton was consecrated as first bishop of the new Diocese of East Szechwan. Ku Ho-lin continued as assistant bishop of East Szechwan until he retired in 1947. Kenneth Bevan became bishop of East Szechwan after Houghton's resignation in 1940. During this period, in addition to hospitals in Langzhong (Langchung) and Liangshan, the Church also had middle schools in Dachuan and Liangshan. Two celebrations were held in 1945, one for the Golden Jubilee of the Diocese of Szechwan, the other for the Diamond Jubilee of the start of the Anglican mission in Sichuan.

== After 1949 ==
After the communist takeover of China in 1949, Protestant churches in China were forced to sever their ties with respective overseas churches, which led to the merging of all the denominations into the communist-sanctioned Three-Self Patriotic Church.

The Anglican Church in China was never formally dissolved, but all activities had ceased by 1958. The China Christian Council was founded at the third national Christian conference in 1980 to unite and provide services for Protestant churches, formulating Church Order and encouraging theological education. In 2018, the detention of 100 Christians in Sichuan, including their pastor Wang Yi, raised concerns about religious crackdown in China.

== Gallery ==
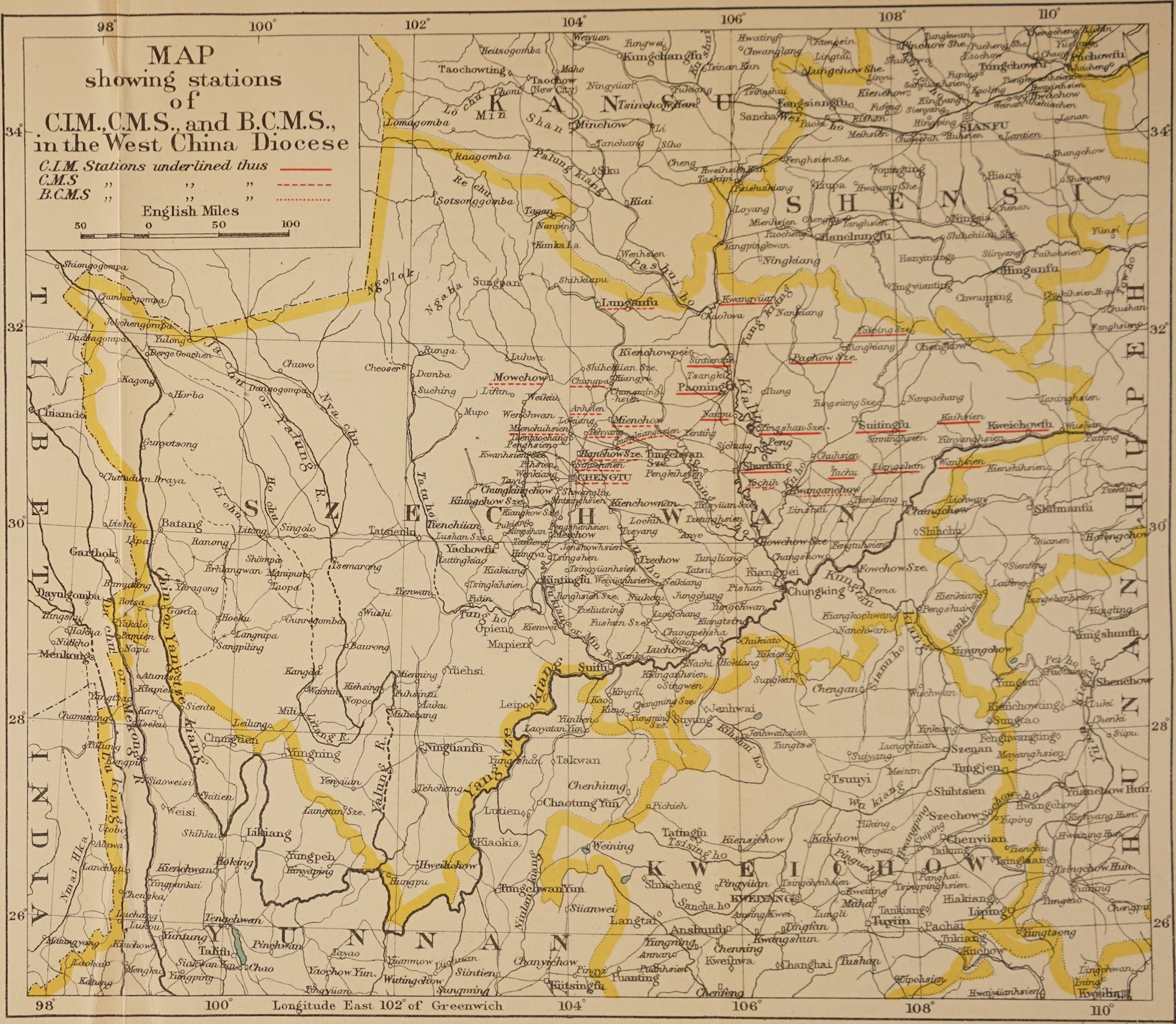
Map of Sichuan showing Anglican mission stations of China Inland Mission (CIM), Church Missionary Society (CMS) and Bible Churchmen's Missionary Society (BCMS), in the West China Diocese, 1926.

Map of Sichuan showing Anglican mission stations of CIM, CMS and BCMS, in the West China Diocese (pinyinified version)

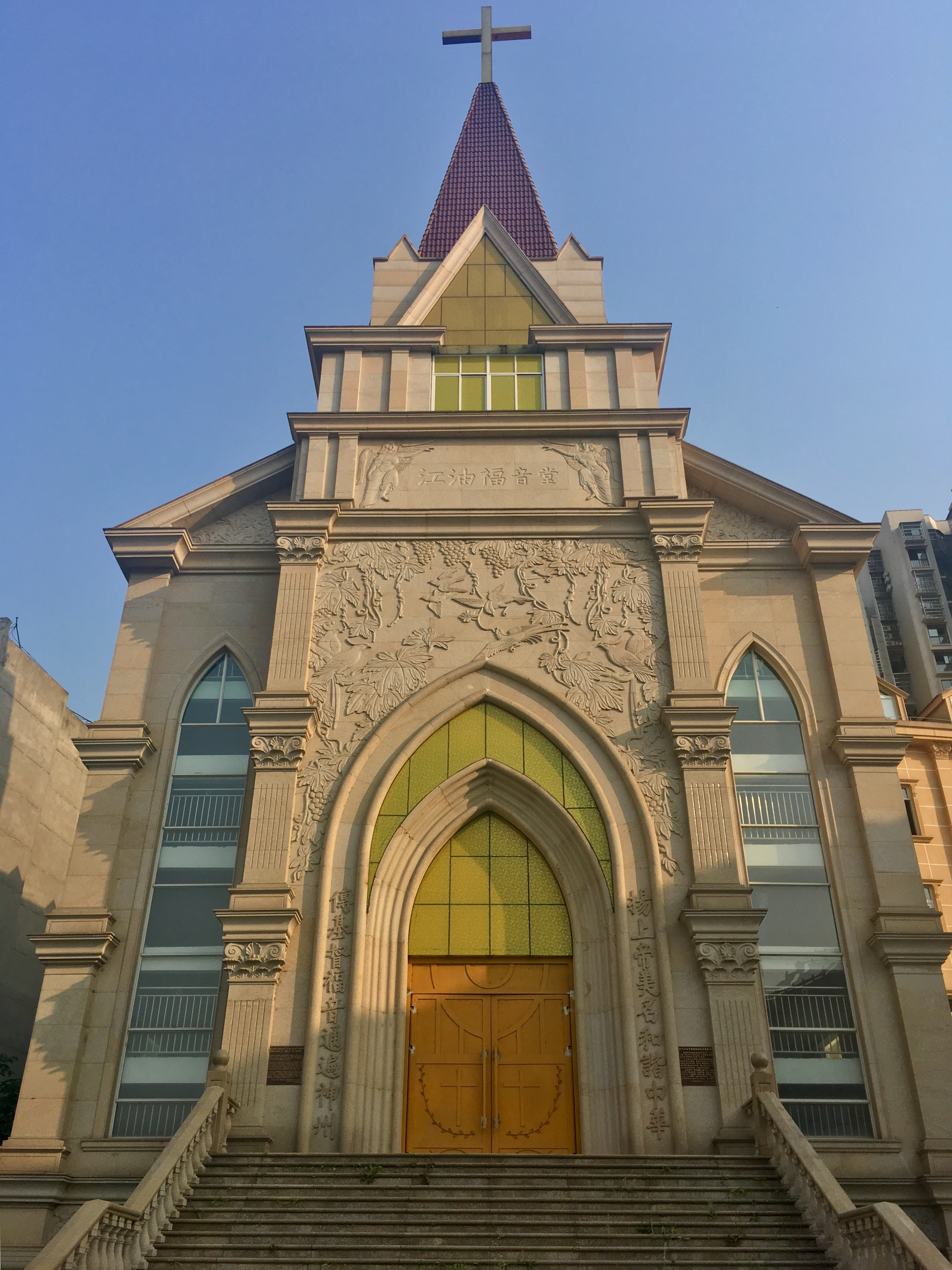
Gospel Church, Jiangyou (CMS; West Szechwan Diocese)

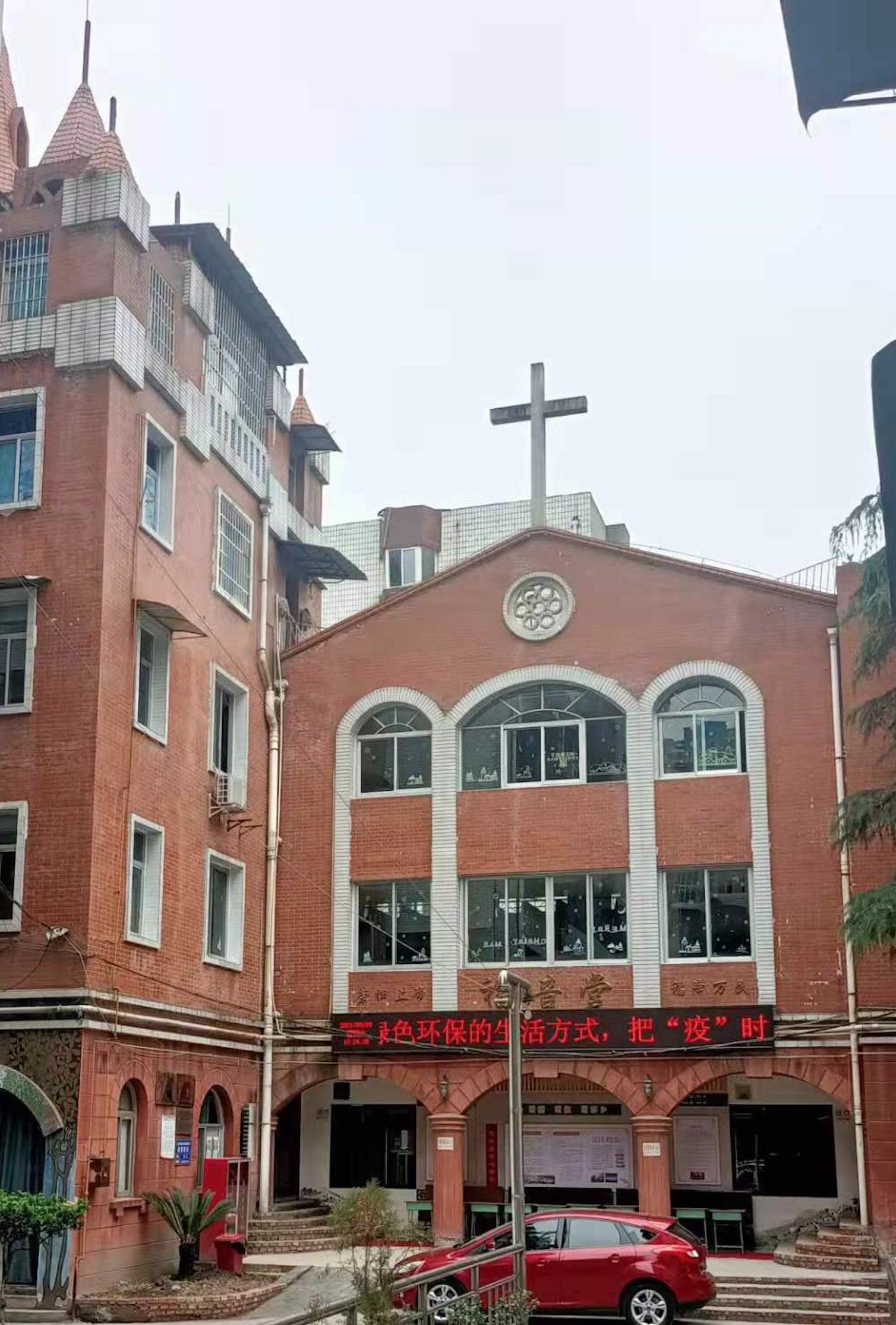
Gospel Church, Mianzhou (CMS; West Szechwan Diocese)

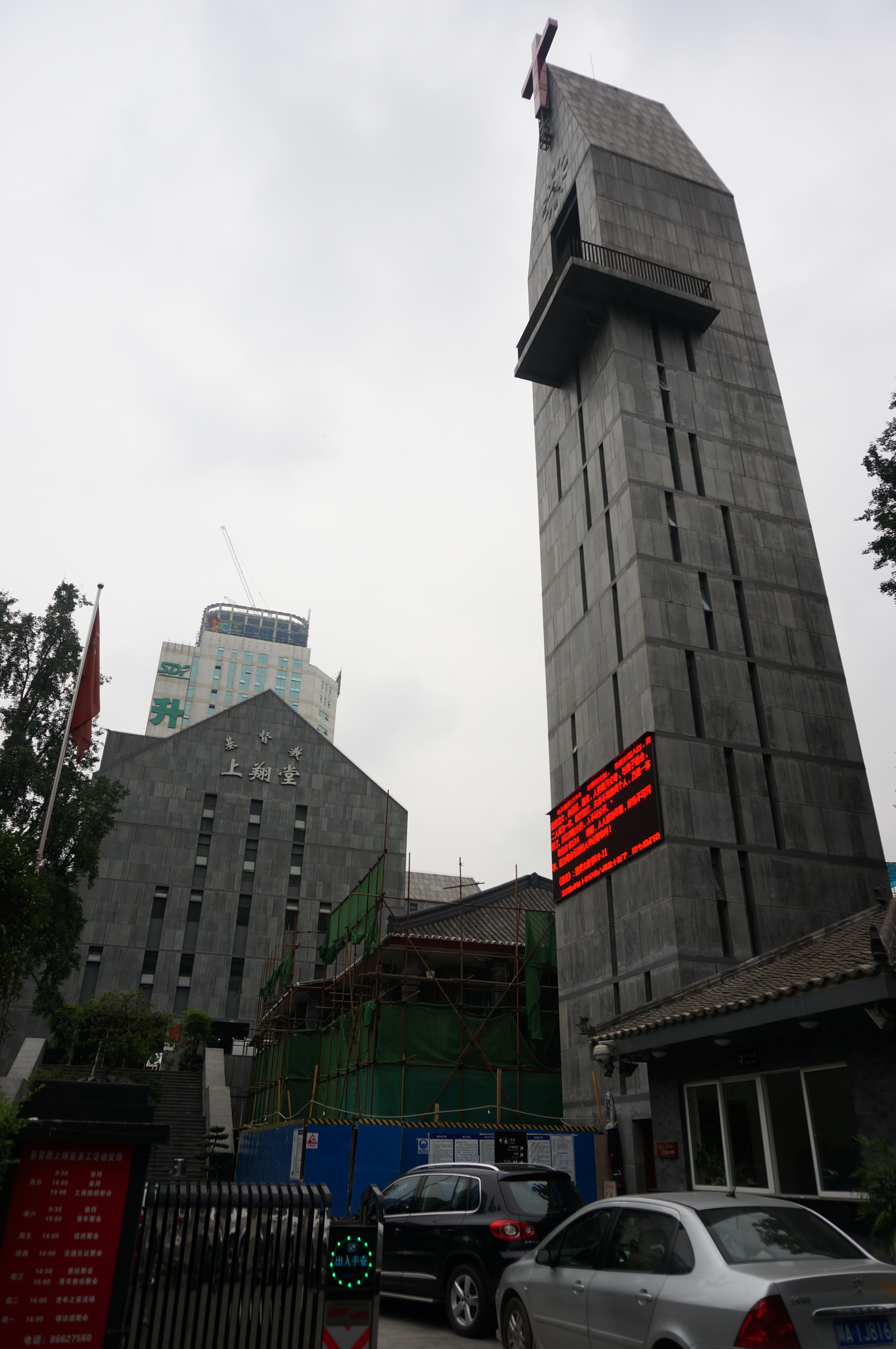
St John's Church, Chengdu (CIM; West Szechwan Diocese)

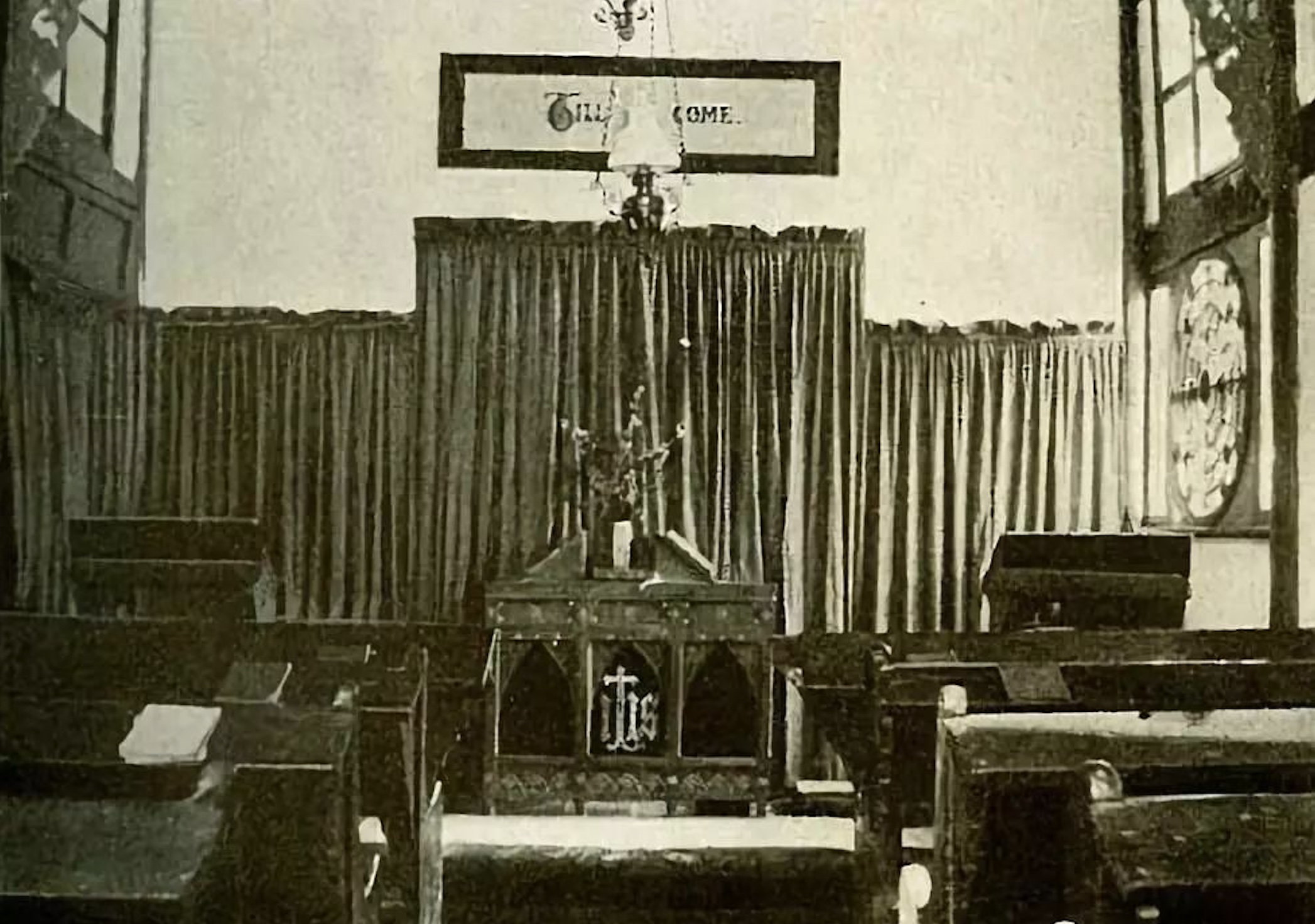
Interior of the Trinity Church at Baoning, 1890s (CIM; East Szechwan Diocese)

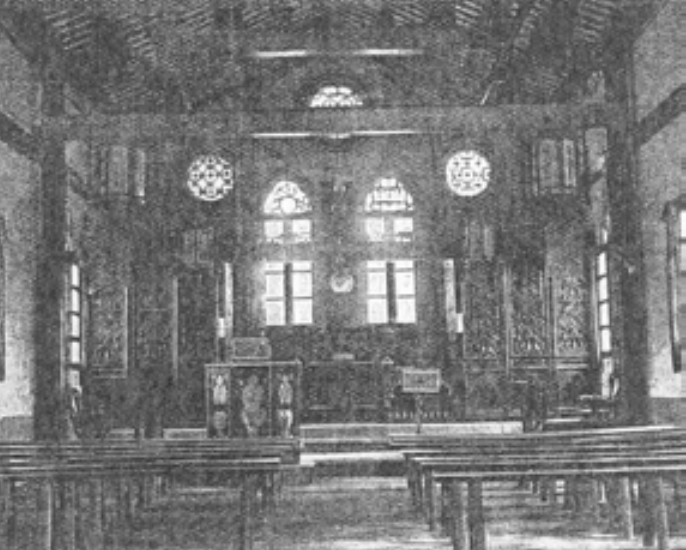
Interior of St. John's Cathedral at Baoning, 1910s (CIM; East Szechwan Diocese)

== See also ==
- Christianity in Sichuan
  - Church of the East in Sichuan
  - Catholic Church in Sichuan
  - Protestantism in Sichuan
    - Anglicanism in Mianyang
    - Methodism in Sichuan
    - Quakerism in Sichuan
    - Baptist Christianity in Sichuan
    - Seventh-day Adventist Church in Sichuan
- The West China Missionary News
- Anti-Christian Movement (China)
- Anti-missionary riots in China
- Antireligious campaigns of the Chinese Communist Party
- Church Missionary Society in China
- Denunciation Movement
- House church (China)
- Category:Diocese of Western China
- Category:Anglican missionaries in Sichuan
