= William Cassels =

Anglican missionary bishop

William Wharton Cassels
- Bishop of Western China
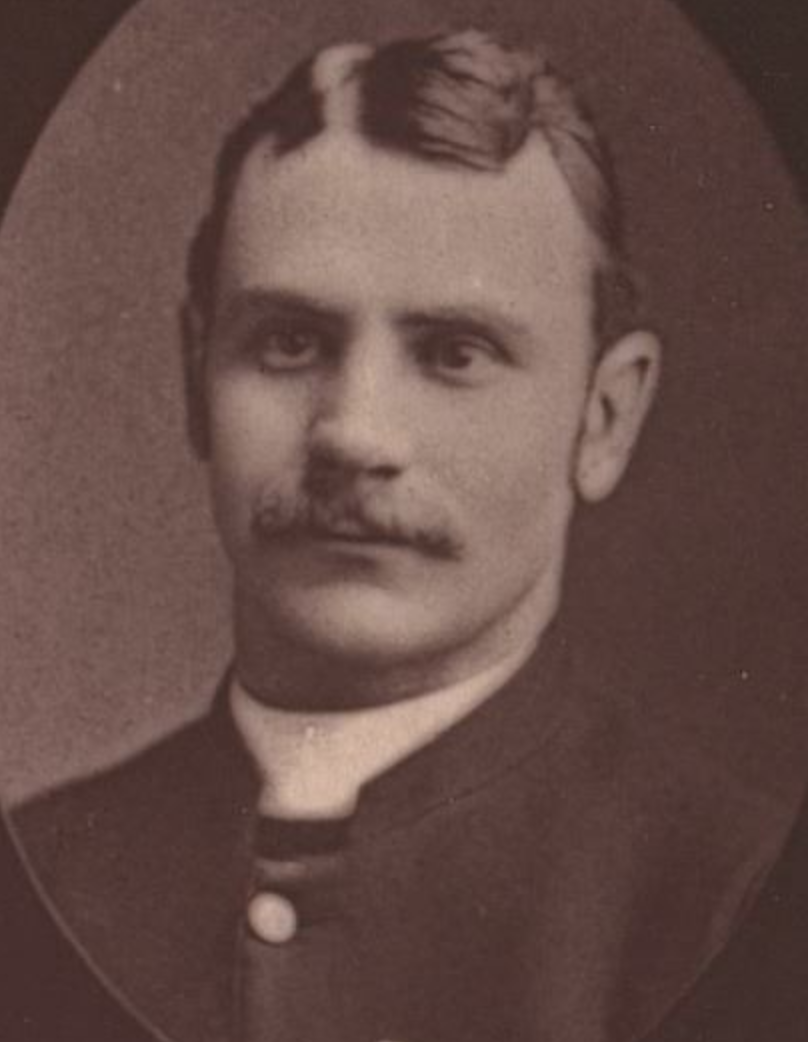
- William Cassels (photography published in 1886 in A Missionary Band: A Record and an Appeal by Benjamin Broomhall)
- Church: Church in China
- Diocese: Western China
- Installed: 1895
- Term ended: 1925
- Successor: Howard Mowll

Orders
- Consecration: 18 October 1895 by Edward White Benson

Personal details
- Born: 11 March 1858 Oporto, Kingdom of Portugal
- Died: 7 November 1925 (aged 67) Paoning, Szechwan, Republican China
- Buried: St John's Cathedral, Paoning
- Denomination: Anglican
- Parents: John Cassels; Ethelinda Cox
- Spouse: Mary Louisa Legg
- Children: Harold Cassels
- Education: Perceval House School; Repton School; St John's College, Cambridge

William Wharton Cassels (11 March 1858 – 7 November 1925) was an Anglican missionary bishop.

== Early life and education ==
Cassels was born in Oporto, Portugal, the sixth son of John Cassels, a merchant, and Ethelinda Cox, a distant relation of Warren Hastings. He was educated at Percival House School, Repton School and St John's College, Cambridge.

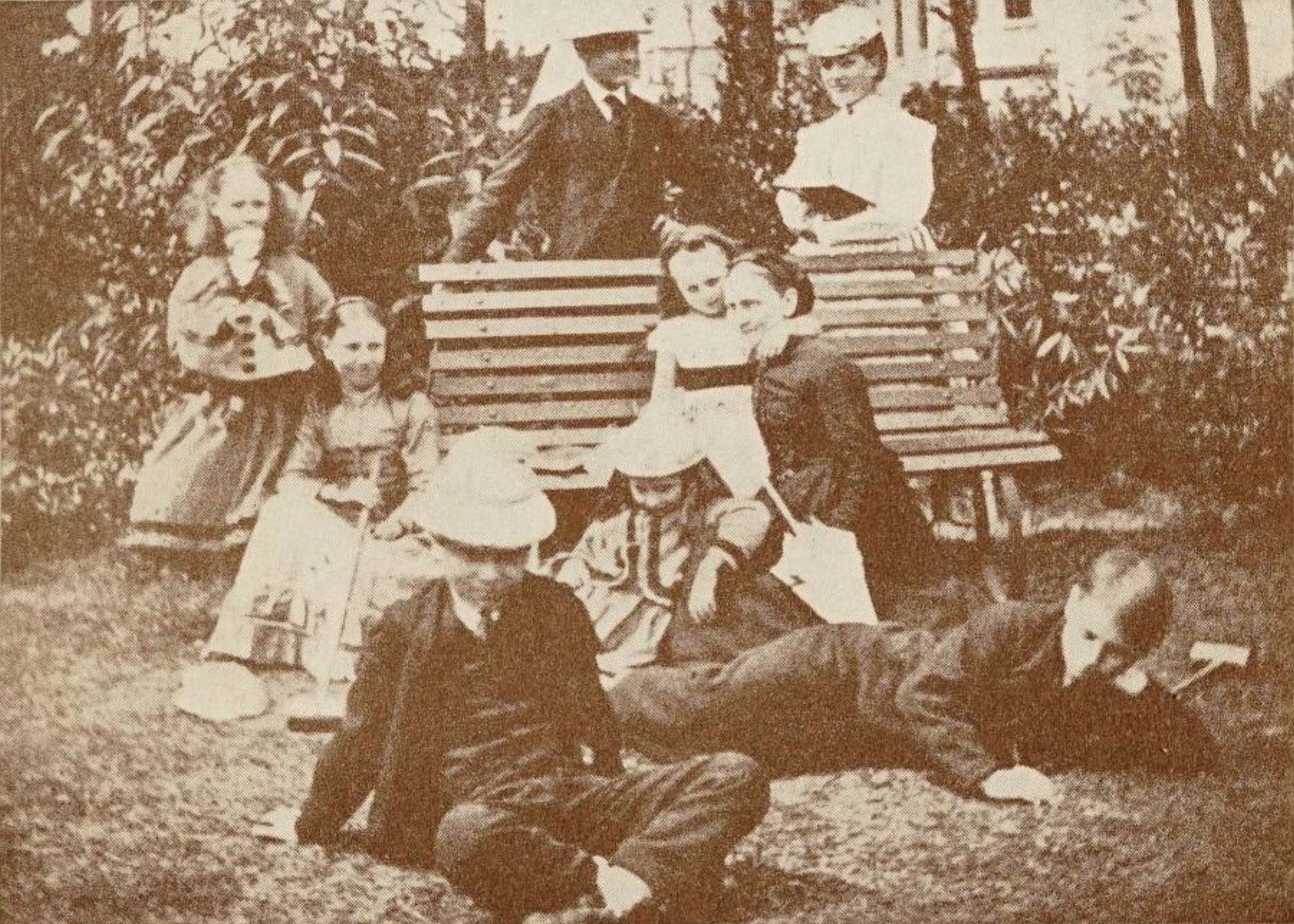
William Cassels's family in the garden of their Oporto home, 1860s.

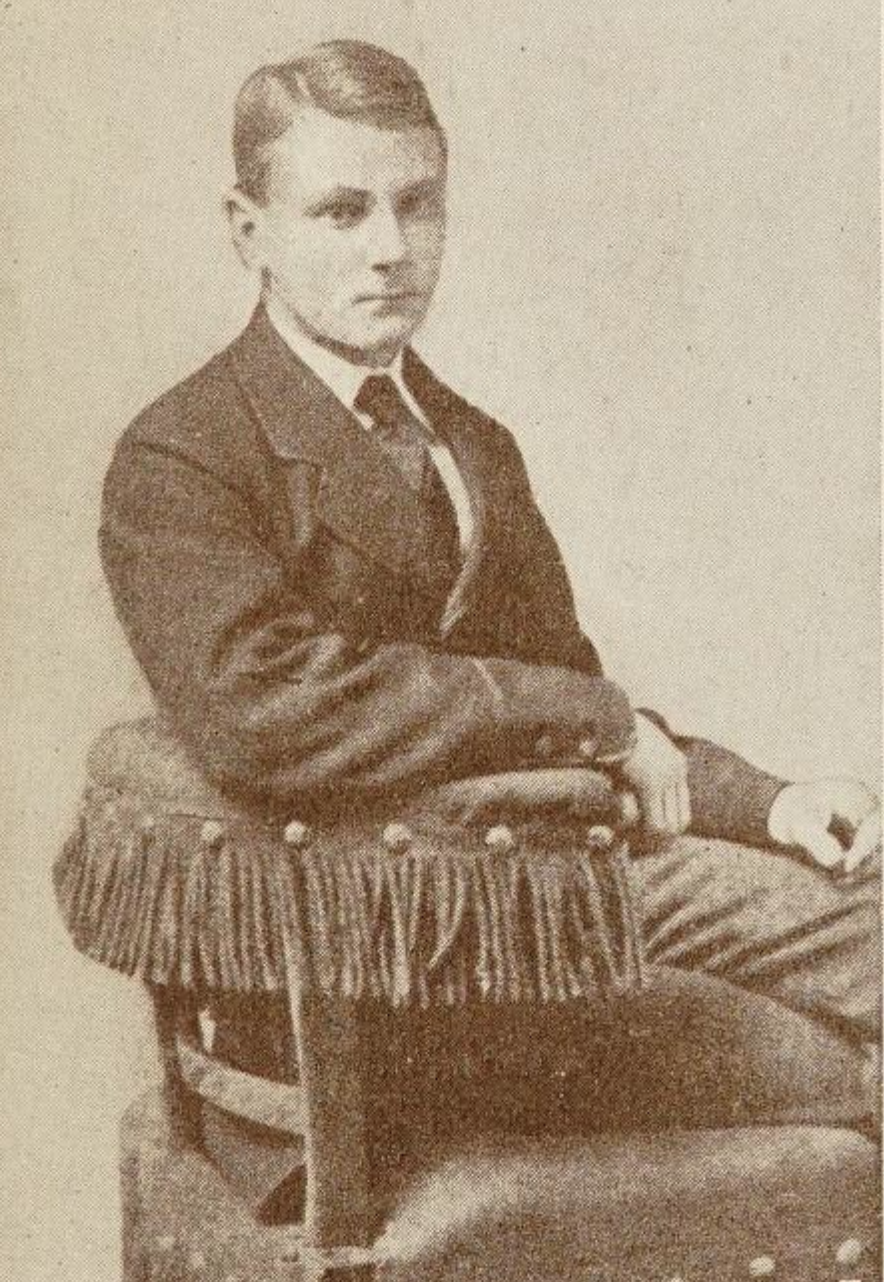
Cassels when at Percival House School, 1870s.

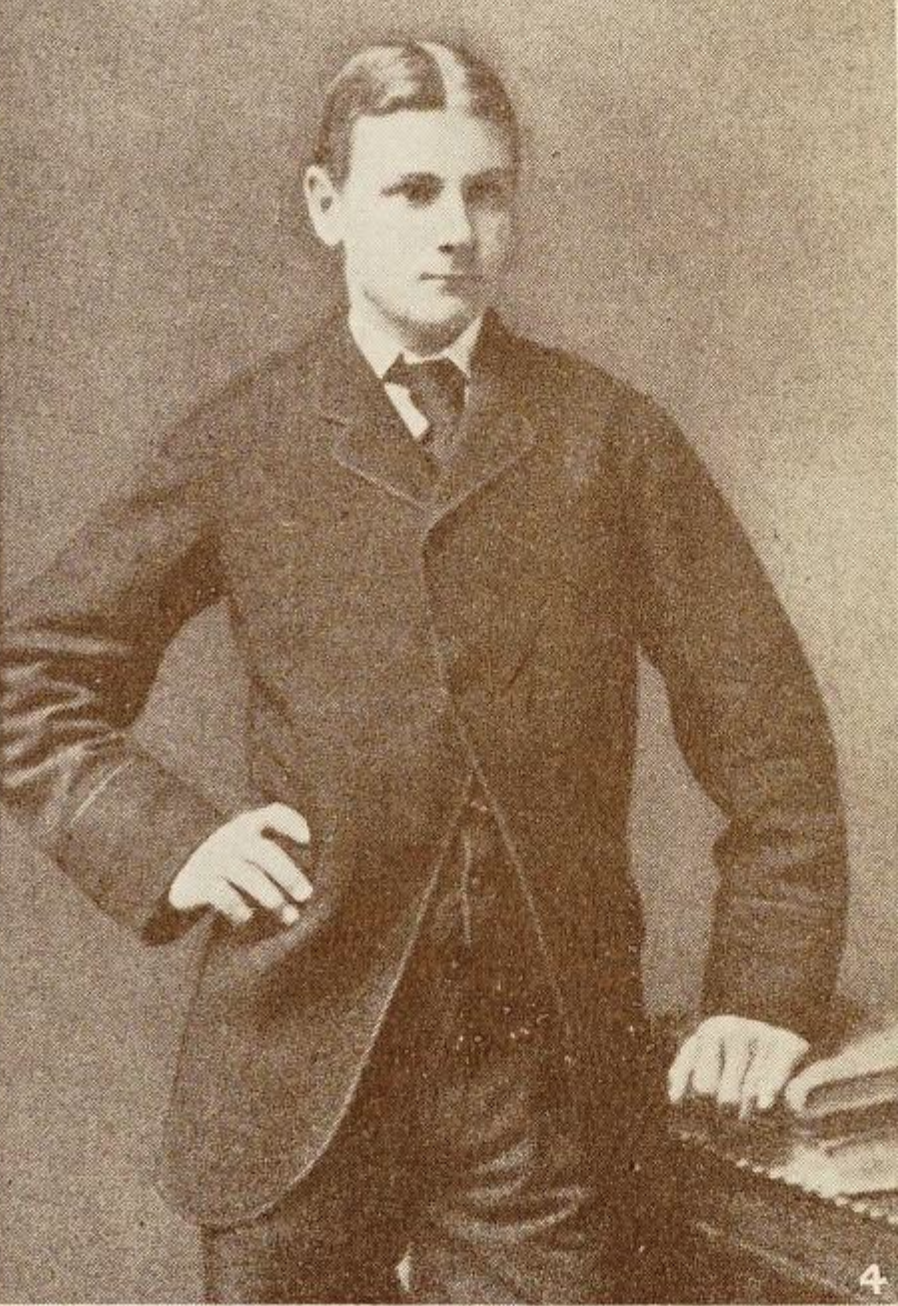
Cassels when at Repton School, 1870s.

== Work ==
He was ordained deacon (Rochester) on 4 June 1882 and priest on 10 June 1883. He was a curate at All Saints' South Lambeth from 1882 to 1885. A member of the famous 'Cambridge Seven', he joined the China Inland Mission in 1885, together with Arthur T. Polhill-Turner and Montagu Proctor-Beauchamp, the three established a proper Church of England diocese in Szechwan. In 1895, he became the Bishop of Western China (West China Diocese). One of the foremost missionaries of his time, who possessed great gifts of organisation, he understood the Chinese and was held in great veneration by them.

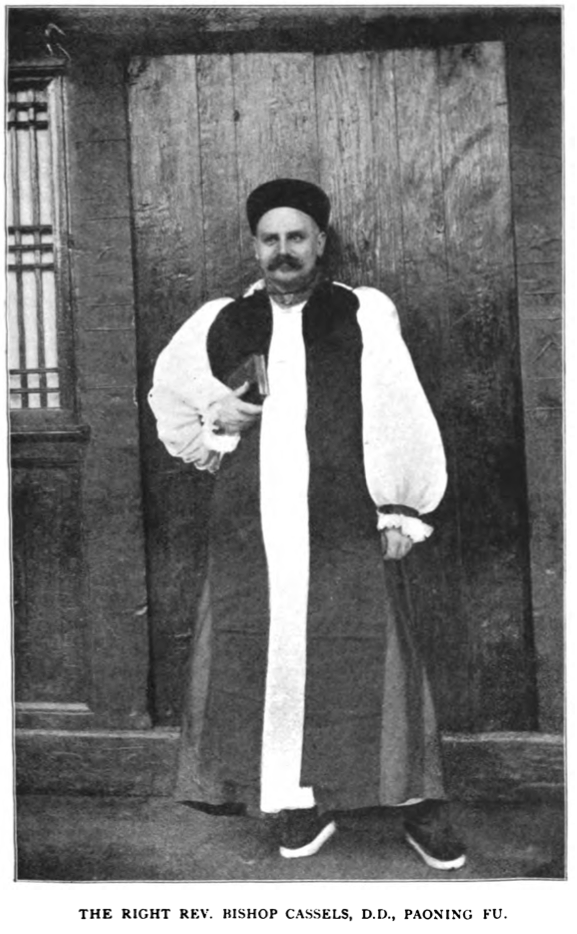
The right Rev. Bishop Cassels of Paoning Fu, in Qing-dynasty mandarin clothing; photography by Isabella Bird, 1899.

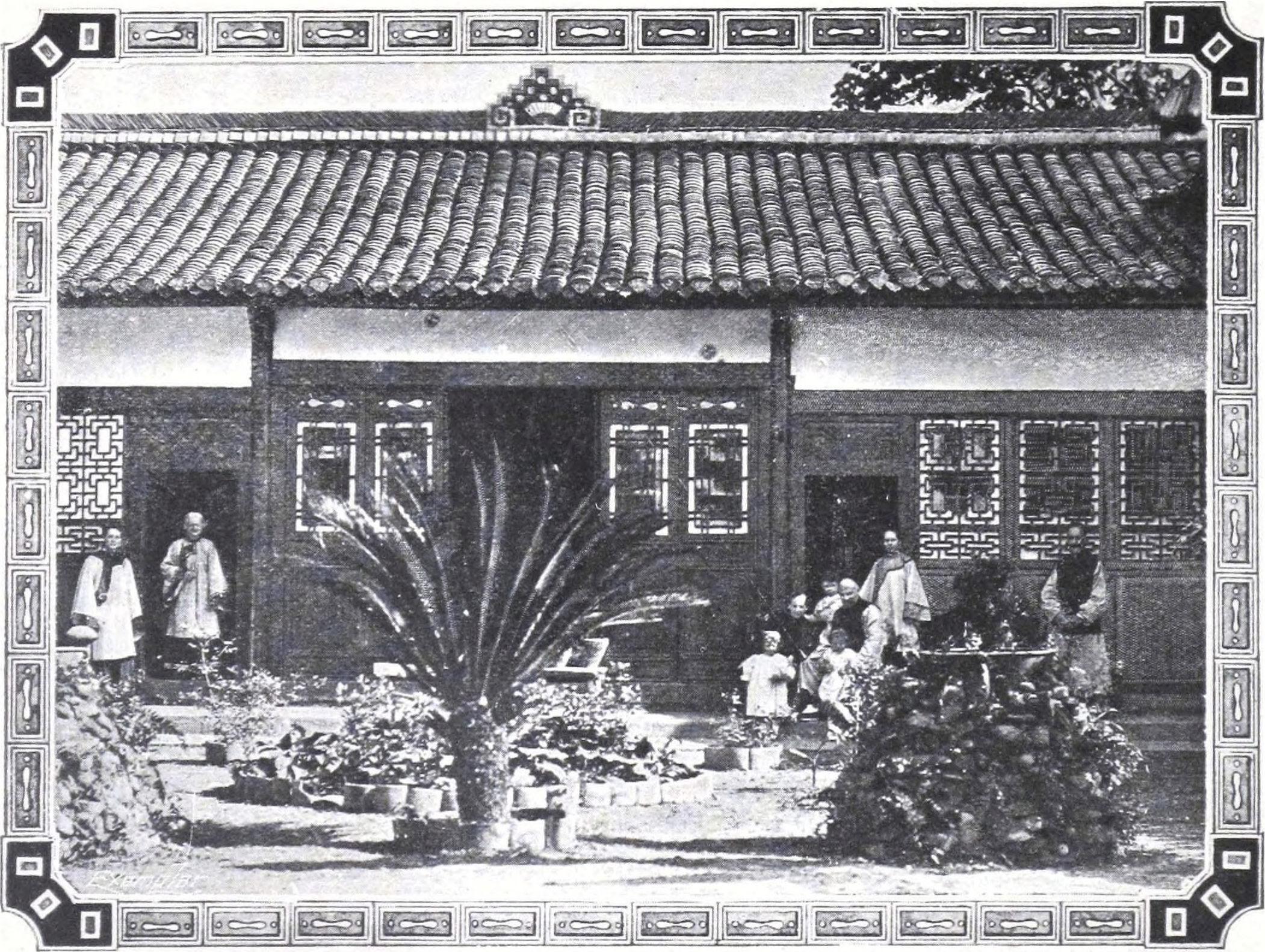
Bishop Cassels, his wife Mary Louisa Cassels (née Legg) and family, and other missionary workers at their mission home in Paoning; photography by Arthur T. Polhill-Turner, before 1901.

== Family and death ==
Cassels married Mary Louisa Legg, daughter of Edward Legg, at Holy Trinity Cathedral in Shanghai, on 4 October 1887. They had several children. He died on 7 November 1925 at Paoning, Szechwan, buried in the garden of St John's Cathedral of Paoning. Mrs Cassels died eight days later. He had a son Harold Cassels born in Szechwan.

== Publications ==
- Cassels, W. W. (1898). Wang: A Chinese Christian (new ed.). London: Morgan & Scott.
- Cassels, W. W. (1908). The Claims of China on the Church of Christ. "Day of Opportunity and the C.M.S." series (No. 2). London: Church Missionary Society.

== See also ==
- Anglicanism in Sichuan

== Bibliography ==
- Broomhall, Marshall (1926). W. W. Cassels: First Bishop in Western China. London: The China Inland Mission.
