= Livingstone Medal =

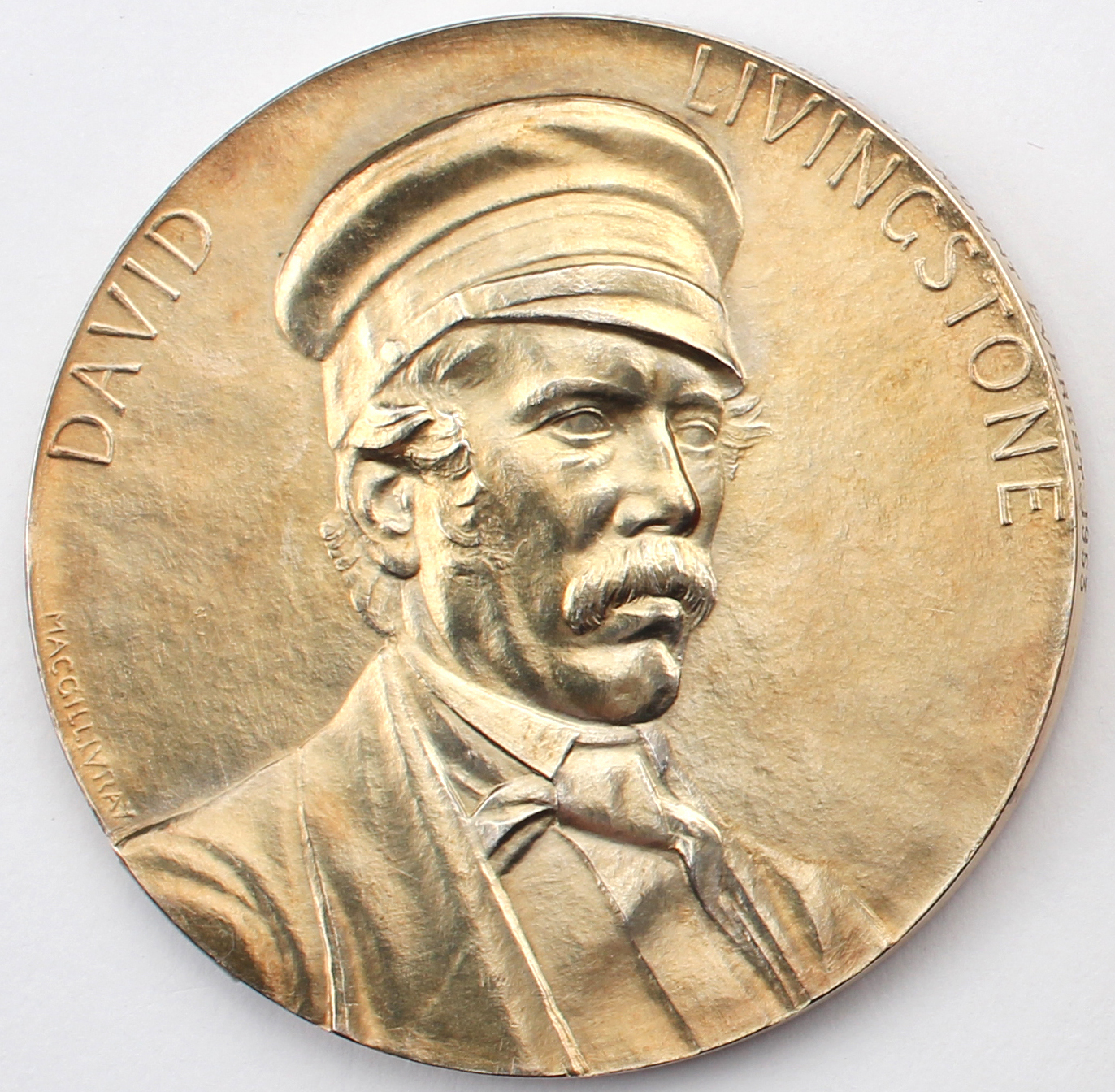

The Livingstone Medal is awarded by the Royal Scottish Geographical Society in recognition of outstanding service of a humanitarian nature with a clear geographical dimension. This was awarded first in 1901.

Named after the African explorer David Livingstone it was endowed in 1901 by his daughter, Agnes Livingstone Bruce. Designed by the sculptor James Pittendrigh MacGillivray, it has a portrait of Livingstone on the front and a depiction of the Spirit of Civilisation on the reverse.

== Recipients ==
Source: RSGS

- 2020 Ban Ki-moon
- 2018 Josh Littlejohn MBE & Alice Thompson
- 2016 Magnus MacFarlane-Barrow OBE
- 2015 Annie Lennox OBE
- 2012 Mary Robinson
- 2009 Rory Stewart OBE
- 2008 Michael Palin CBE
- 2006 The Duke of Edinburgh's Award Scheme
- 2004 HRH The Princess Royal
- 2002 Christopher Brasher CBE
- 2001 Dr Robert D Ballard
- 2000 The Rt Hon Baroness Chalker of Wallasey PC
- 1998 HRH The Duke of Edinburgh KT
- 1997 Sir David Hempleman-Adams LVO OBE
- 1996 HE Chief Emeka Anyaoku
- 1995 Médecins Sans Frontières
- 1994 Dr Richard Leakey
- 1993 Sir Martin Holdgate CB
- 1992 Sir Steven Runciman CH
- 1991 Sir Chris Bonington CVO CBE
- 1989 Sir David Attenborough OM CH CVO CBE FRS
- 1988 Tim Severin
- 1982 Sir Ranulph T-W Fiennes OBE
- 1981 Dr David R Stoddart OBE
- 1978 Professor Ronald F E W Peel
- 1975 The 1975 British Everest Expedition
- 1974 Colonel John Blashford-Snell OBE
- 1971 Neil Armstrong
- 1969 Sir Wally W Herbert
- 1967 Sir Francis Chichester KBE
- 1966 Paul-Emile Victor
- 1964 Professor Eduard Imhof
- 1962 Major Sir Wilfred Patrick Thesiger KBE DSO
- 1961 Professor André Allix
- 1956 Sir John Bagot Glubb KCB CMG DSO OBE MC
- 1955 Sir Robert Charles Evans FRCS
- 1953 Sir Edmund Hillary KBE
- 1953 Sir John Hunt KT CBE DSO
- 1951 Eric Earle Shipton CBE
- 1950 Professor Alan G Ogilvie OBE
- 1947 Captain Ejnar Mikkelsen
- 1944 Major Noel Ewart Odell
- 1943 Miss Eva French
- 1943 Miss Francesca French
- 1943 Miss Mildred Cable
- 1939 The Rt Hon Lord Hailey KCSI KCIE
- 1936 Frank Kingdon-Ward
- 1932 Bertram Thomas OBE
- 1931 Sir Hubert Wilkins MC
- 1930 Sir Wilfred Grenfell KCMG
- 1928 Sir Alan J Cobham KBE
- 1927 Dr Isaiah Bowman
- 1926 The Rt Hon Viscount Allenby GCB GCMG
- 1925 Captain Roald Amundsen
- 1924 Dr Marion I Newbigin
- 1921 Colonel Frederick M Bailey CIE
- 1916 Douglas W Freshfield DCL
- 1915 Lord Kitchener of Khartoum KG KP GCB OM GCMG GCSI GCIE
- 1913 Captain Edward R G R Evans RN KCB DSO SGM
- 1910 Sir John Murray KCB FRS FRSE DSc DCL LLD
- 1909 Sir Ernest H Shackleton CVO FRSGS
- 1908 The Rt Hon Lord Avebury PC DCL LLD FRS
- 1907 The Rt Hon Viscount Milner PC GCB GCMG
- 1906 The Rt Hon Sir George D Taubman Goldie PC KCMG FRS DCL LLD
- 1905 Sir Archibald Geikie OM KCB PRS FRSE DCL LLD FRS
- 1904 Captain Robert Falcon Scott RN CVO MVO
- 1903 Commander Robert E Peary USN
- 1902 Dr Sven Anders Hedin
- 1901 Sir Harry H Johnston GCMG KCB

== See also ==
- List of geography awards
- List of awards named after people
