= Topsy =

Topsy may refer to:

== Arts and entertainment ==
- Topsy, a character in the novel Uncle Tom's Cabin
- Topsy, a character in the 2018 film Mary Poppins Returns
- Topsy and Eva, a 1928 film based on Uncle Tom's Cabin
- Topsy and Tim, a children's book series
- Topsy (Tom and Jerry), a character in the cartoon series Tom and Jerry
- "Topsy" (instrumental), a jazz instrumental first recorded by Count Basie, then by Benny Goodman, and later by Cozy Cole
- "Topsy" (Bob's Burgers), the 38th episode of the animated comedy series Bob's Burgers

== People ==
- Topsy Küppers (1931–2025), an Austrian actress, singer, and writer
- Topsy Sinden (1877–1950), an English dancer, actress, and singer
- Topsy (d.1998), an abused Chinese girl, subject of The Story of Topsy, a book by Mildred Cable

== Places in the United States ==
- Topsy, Missouri, an unincorporated community
- Topsy, Kansas, a ghost town
- Topsy, Oklahoma, a rural community also known as "Chloeta"

== Other uses ==
- Topsy (elephant) (c. 1875–1903), a circus animal electrocuted by her owners
- Topsy (analytics), an online social media and communications insights platform
- A codename of the Mitsubishi Ki-5-II, an aircraft
- Topsy's Roost, a former restaurant and nightclub at Playland-at-the-Beach in San Francisco
- Topsy the Camel, part of the US Army, Ringling Brothers Circus, and the Hollywood film industry

== See also ==
- Topsy-Turvy (disambiguation)
