= Henrietta Soltau =

British evangelist

- Born: 8 December 1843; Plymouth
- Died: 5 February 1934 (aged 90); London

Henrietta Soltau (8 December 1843 – 5 February 1934) was a British evangelist and promoter of missionary work.

== Life ==
Soltau was born in 1843 in Plymouth. She was the eldest but one of the eight children of Henry William and Lucy Soltau. When she was ten in August 1854 she was baptised by the Plymouth Brethren evangelist pastor Robert Chapman. Her father was a teacher for the Plymouth Brethren and a writer. She and her sisters, Lucy and Agnes, were her father's assistants at his outdoor meetings. She recalls how enthusiastic her father was after hearing James Hudson Taylor talk and immediately began organising for him to talk at his meeting. After they heard him talk then it was decided that Agnes would not become a missionary but Henrietta would and Agnes would support her. Henrietta volunteered with her family's support. Her father and her brothers became Taylor's supporters.

George Brealey was a tract writer and well regarded Plymouth Brethren. Soltau and her sister were soon helping him after the family had moved to Exeter.

In 1882 when she nearly forty she had a spiritual event known as a "second blessing" and she was then established with the Plymouth Brethren. Before this her father had allowed her to preach but only in the fresh air or in the meeting room.

She started to support the China Inland Mission (CIM) who sent missionaries to China and the group founded by James Hudson Taylor. The CIM were unusual because they wore traditional Chinese clothes and they did not solicit funds but relied on people assisting with contributions of time or money. Soltau decide to help with the children of the missionaries who required a home. She set up a home for them in Tottenham. In time this moved to Hastings, where Soltau also created a branch of the YWCA, a holiday home and she delivered evangelistic services at the Railway Mission Hall. She led the newly created China Inland Mission's ladies' council at James Hudson Taylor's invitation.

In 1889 she set up a training facility for women who wanted to be missionaries for the China Inland Mission. Soltau had wanted to be a missionary herself but her health was not considered sufficient. However she did set out in 1897 and spent over a year in a visit to China. She retired in 1916 from training missionaries who went to many parts of the world and 547 were to assist the CIM. Soltau continued to support the CIM in her retirement as Chair of the women's council.

Soltau died in 1934 in London. That year Mildred Cable and Francesca French published the book A Woman Who Laughed: Henrietta Soltau, who laughed at impossibilities and cried: "It shall be done."
