= Gospel of Grace Church =

The Gospel of Grace Church (Chinese: 福音堂) also known as Grace Evangelical Church is an independent Chinese Christian church founded in Shandong by Xi Sheng-Mo (席胜魔) in 1881. In 1906, Yu Zong-Zhou (俞宗周) established this church in Shanghai. This was one of the earliest indigenous churches established by local Chinese Christians.
