= Percy C. Mather =

British missionary

Percy Cunningham Mather (Chinese: 马尔昌; 9 December 1882 – 24 May 1933) was a pioneer British Protestant Christian missionary to China, the second China Inland Mission missionary to Xinjiang.

Mather was born in Fleetwood, Lancashire, England in 1884, the son of a railway employee and an Irish nurse. Mather went into railway service like his father. In 1903 he was converted to Christianity through the ministry of J. H. Doddrell of the Wesleyan Methodist Church. Mather soon became a Sunday school teacher and local preacher. While his ordination was delayed, he learned about the China Inland Mission (CIM) and decided to go to China after assisting his sister financially to get an education.

In 1910 Mather sailed to Shanghai, then moved up the Yangtze river to attend the Anqing language school. Afterward he was stationed in Ningguo in Anhui Province. Mather was influenced by reading Roland Allen's book, Missionary Methods: St. Paul's or Ours? and then he volunteered to join George Hunter in Ürümqi, Xinjiang, arriving there in 1914. Until 1926 the two itinerated in Xinjiang and Outer Mongolia. When Mather joined him, Hunter had a work among all the different peoples of Central Asia. Mather joined full heartedly in the work, but his specific focus was towards the Mongols. Quickly he set about learning Mongol, but the only Mongol teacher he could find in the city with extra time was in the local jail. Afterward he produced a grammar, and a dictionary in Oirat Mongolian, as well as a grammar and dictionary of Manchu, but they were never published, and it is unclear what became of the manuscripts.

Following intensive medical studies while on furlough in 1927, Mather returned to China to concentrate on medical work as well as on translations, grammars, and dictionaries of Mongolian languages.

Mather was caught up in hostilities in China during the Chinese Civil War, and was accused of political intrigue. He died on 24 May 1933 of typhus, during the siege of Ürümqi, when caring for people wounded during the Kumul Rebellion led by Ma Zhongying; Emil Fischbacher died there three days later. He was buried in Ürümqi.

== Bibliography ==
- George Hunter: Apostle of Turkestan by Mildred Cable and Francesca French, (1948)
- Percy Mather: The Making of a Pioneer by Alice Mildred Cable and Francesca Law French
- Mather, Percy (1882-1933)
- SOAS Archives Information
- Past auction of some Mather letters and Pictures

== See also ==
- Historical Bibliography of the China Inland Mission
- George W. Hunter
- Emil Fischbacher
- Otto F. Schoerner
- List of China Inland Mission missionaries in China
