= George W. Hunter (missionary) =

Scottish missionary

George W. Hunter MBE (Chinese name: 胡进洁) (31 July 1861 – 20 December 1946) was a Scottish Protestant Christian missionary of the China Inland Mission who worked in China and Turkestan.

== Early life ==
Hunter was born in Kincardineshire, and spent his childhood on Deeside. Hunter's mother died when he was still very small. When he was young he was in love with a woman named Jessie, but she died young (at age 22), and was buried at Aberdeen. Hunter wanted to serve God in missions. The first time he applied for service abroad, he was refused, and focused his attention on serving God at home in places like the YMCA. The second time he applied with the China Inland Mission he was finally accepted.

== China ==
Hunter arrived in China 1889. After studying the Chinese language for two years at Anqing, he was sent to the Gansu mission station. Although he liked the prayer and Bible study times with his fellow missionaries, rules and regulations and meal times were irksome to him, and he took long itinerations, establishing temporary centres at Hezhou, Xining, Ningxia, and Liangzhou. He learned a lot during this time about communicating Christian teaching to Muslims and Tibetans.

When the Boxer Rebellion broke out the governor of Gansu helped his missionaries to get safely out of China, and then Hunter took his one and only visit back to Scotland. Here he visited the grave of Jessie, and put a granite heart over it, as her family would not allow him to erect a tombstone. He had made a resolution during language school not to marry, so that he could be more fully devoted to God.

He departed for China a second time on 24 February 1902 on the S.S. König Albert and on arriving in China was reappointed to Lanzhou. Again he made many long journeys in the countryside.

=== Xinjiang and Gansu ===
On 27 March 1906 he moved to Urumqi (Tihwafu), Xinjiang. The next forty years he spent mostly travelling. He travelled all throughout Xinjiang, and even went as far as Khovd. During his travels he preached in Kazakh, Uyghur, Manchu, Mongolian, Nogai, Arabic, and Chinese, and distributed gospel literature in those languages. He would also visit and encourage a 200 family settlement of White Russians who had settled in Gulja.

George W. Hunter noted that while Tungan Muslims (Chinese Muslims) would almost never prostitute their daughters, Turki Muslims (Uyghurs) would prostitute their daughters, which was why Turki prostitutes were common around the country.

Under Sheng Shicai's regime, he was arrested under false charges, and locked up in a Soviet prison cell in Ürümqi for thirteen months and subjected to various tortures. Finally he was released, and escorted out of the city. He then went to Lanzhou, Gansu, and later on farther west to Ganzhou, hoping that when Xinjiang opened up again, he would be ready to go back.

He died in Ganzhou, Gansu, on 20 December 1946.

== Translations ==
Hunter translated Matthew, Mark, Luke, John, Acts, and Genesis into Kazakh. He also translated The Pilgrim's Progress, Mark, Acts, 1 Samuel, and twenty-five chapters of Genesis into Uyghur, and Mark into Nogai language.

He also published a small book of collected Qazaq, Tatar, Uzbek, Uyghur, Azerbaijani, Kirghiz, Turkish and Astrakhan Turkic literature with English translations by himself. He also translated into English a section from "Narratives of the Prophets" and published it side by side with the original Uighur.

== See also ==
- Christianity in Xinjiang
- Historical Bibliography of the China Inland Mission
- Percy C. Mather
- Emil Fischbacher

== Bibliography ==
- Mildred Cable and Francesca French, George Hunter: Apostle of Turkestan (1948)
- B. V. Henry, Fakkelbæreren til de ukjente: pionermisjonæren George Hunter i Sentral-Asia, Oslo: Lunde (2001)
- Hunter, George W., Examples of the Various Turki Dialects: Turki text with English translation, Tihwafu: China Inland Mission (1918)
