= Xi Shengmo =

Chinese Christian leader

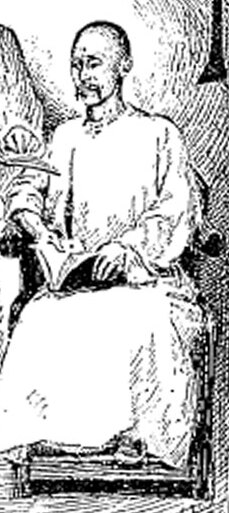
- Born: c. 1836; Shanxi, Qing Empire
- Died: 19 February 1896; Shanxi, Qing Empire

Xi Shengmo (Chinese: 席勝魔; Wade–Giles: Hsi Shêng-mo; c. 1836–1896) also known as Pastor Hsi, was a Chinese Christian leader.

== Life ==
He was born Xi Zizhi in a village near Linfen, became a Confucian scholar, and, after his conversion to Christianity, changed his given name to Shengmo or Conqueror of Demons. Having been an opium addict himself, he ran a ministry to opium addicts in many locations over a considerable area. There is more written about Xi than any other 19th-century Chinese Protestant, due largely to the two-volume biography written about him by Geraldine Taylor of the China Inland Mission.

== Christian service ==
David Hill, an English Methodist missionary, was instrumental in introducing Xi to Christianity. Xi became a Christian in 1879 when he was 44 years old; he then worked to overcome his own opium addiction.

After his conversion, Pastor Xi fabricated his own medications made of morphia to treat opium addicts, and many sick people were brought to him for healing. Prayer was a major factor in his treatments, and a number of the recoveries were considered miraculous:

At this time I still smoked opium. I tried to break it off by means of native medicine, but could not; by use of foreign medicine, but failed. At last I saw, in reading the New Testament, that there was a Holy Spirit who could help men. I prayed to God to give me His Holy Spirit. He did what man and medicine could not do; He enabled me to break off opium smoking. So, my friends, if you would break off opium, don’t rely on medicine, don’t lean on man, but trust to God. (Transcribed oral testimony of Xi from "Days of Blessing in Inland China")

Xi also wrote numerous Chinese Christian hymns, which were considered more to the liking of the local people than the hymns introduced by the missionaries.

Perhaps the most notable thing about him was the way in which he led out in the Christian missionary work in his area. The general pattern was for Western Christians to enter an area, raise up churches and then train local people as pastors and evangelists. Xi Shengmo took hold of the work with such skill and energy that the missionaries stood aside, to a considerable extent, as he established clinics and churches.

He had studied medicine and set up a pharmacy which was also used to host Christian meetings; he also set up several houses which were used as rehab centres for opium addicts.

He later went on to work with the Cambridge Seven, in particular Stanley P. Smith and Dixon Edward Hoste.

One of the towns where he worked was Hwochow (modern Huaxian) in Shansi; after his time, Mildred Cable and Evangeline and Francesca French worked there as missionaries for 21 years until they left in 1923. "The ramifications of the Church under the direction of the Chinese Pastorate, in immediate succession to the foundation as laid by Pastor Hsi ... were the joy and gratification of the whole community." (Through Jade Gate and Central Asia; by M. Cable & F. French, p. 16).

== Family ==
Xi was the son of a scholar and he married at the age of 16; his wife died young and he remarried at the age of 30.

He had one son, who also died young.

== See also ==
- Charles Studd

== Bibliography ==
- Taylor, Mrs Howard: One of China's Scholars: The Culture & Conversion of a Confucianist. London, China Inland Mission, 1900
- Taylor, Mrs Howard: Pastor Hsi (of North China): One of China's Christians. London, China Inland Mission, 1903
- Alice Mildred Cable: The Fulfilment of a Dream of Pastor Hsi's: The Story of the Work in Hwochow, Morgan & Scott (1917)
- Alvyn Austin: China's Millions: The China Inland Mission and Late Qing Society, 1832-1905. Grand Rapids, Michigan: William B. Eerdmans Publishing Company, 2007.
- Days of Blessing in Inland China: Being an Account of the Meetings Held in the Province of Shan-Si, &c. Morgan & Scott. 1887.
