= David Hill (missionary) =

British missionary

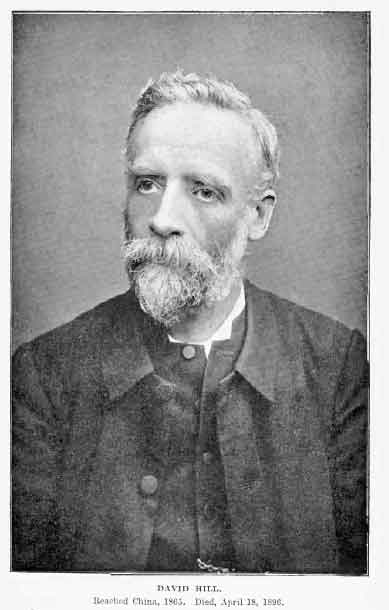
- Missionary to China
- Born: 1840; England
- Died: 1896 (aged 55–56)

David Hill (1840–1896) was a British Wesleyan Methodist missionary to China. He was educated at St Peter's School, York. He served with the English Wesleyan Methodist Society. In Shanxi Province, he was instrumental in the conversion of the Confucian scholar Hsi to Christianity.

From Days of Blessing in Inland China is the report provided orally at two meetings by Hsi (now known as Pastor Hsi) on his first meeting with Rev David Hill:

Some time after this, in the time of the great famine, an Englishman of the name of Li (Rev. David Hill, of the Wesleyan Mission, Wu-ch’ang), came to help us in our extremity. When he had been here some time distributing food and money, he offered a prize of 30 taels (£7 10s.) for the best essay on given Christian subjects. The competitors had books supplied from which to read the subject up, and my essay gained the prize. The next thing was to get the money. I had heard many reports that foreigners could bewitch people, and I feared to fall under their influence. However, I went to P’ing-yang Fu with my brother, and stopped in an inn. My brother volunteered to go for me to get the money, but he came back saying the foreigner wanted to see the very man who had written the essay. Well, I was in a dilemma! On the one hand I feared bewitchment, on the other hand I feared to lose the 30 taels. At last I decided to go. On inquiring at the door, I met Mr. Sung and two men of the name of Li, all there of them natives. Addressing them, I said, “May I ask what you do here?” “Oh,” said they, “we are helping the foreigner.” “And don’t you fear being bewitched?” “No, indeed,” they replied, “nor would you if you knew him.” Mr. Sung then obtained an interview for me with Mr. Hill. One glance, one word, it was enough! As stars fade before the rising sun, so did his presence dissipate the idle rumors I had heard; all trace of my fear was gone, my mind was at rest. I beheld his kindly eye and remembered the words of Mencius, “If a man’s heart is not right his eyes bespeak it.” I realized I was in the present of a true man.

== Bibliography ==
- Days of Blessing in Inland China: Being an Account of the Meetings Held in the Province of Shan-Si, &etc. Morgan & Scott. 1887., intro. By J. Hudson Taylor
- William T. A. Barber, David Hill, Missionary and Saint (1898)
- Harold B. Battenbury, David Hill, Friend of China: A Modern Portrait (1949)
- Jane Elizabeth Hellier, How David Hill Followed Christ: A Biography (1903)
- Mrs. Howard Taylor, One of China's Scholars: The Culture and Conversion of a Confucianist (1900, 1907) Biography of Pastor Hsi

Hill's official correspondence is in the Central China field section of the Wesleyan Methodist Missionary Society archive, now at the School of Oriental and African Studies, University of London.
