= George Taubman Goldie =

Manx administrator

The Right Honourable Sir George Goldie KCMG FRS
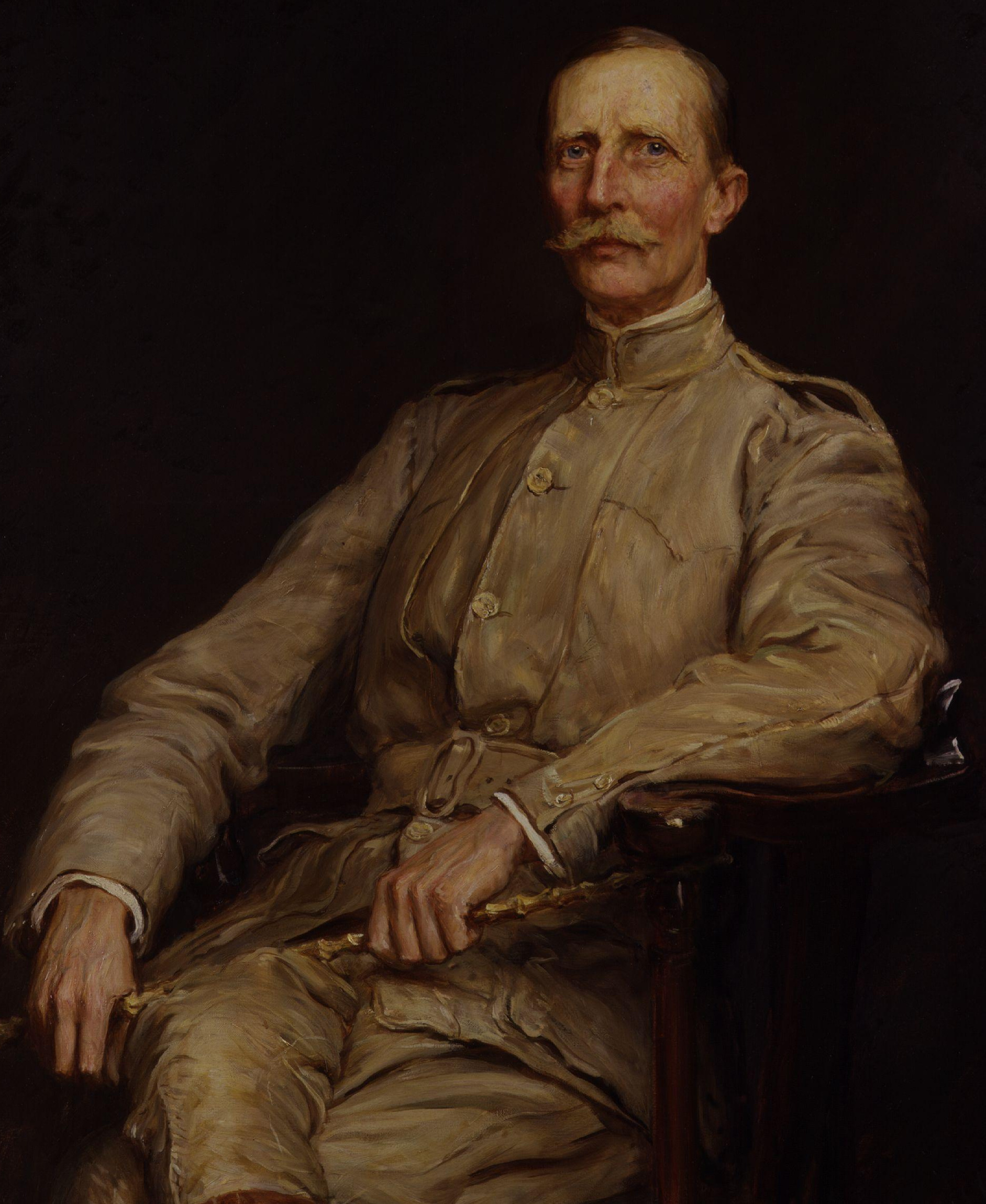

President of the Royal Geographical Society
- In office 22 May 1905 – 25 May 1908
- Preceded by: Sir Clements Markham
- Succeeded by: Leonard Darwin

Governor of the Royal Niger Company
- In office 10 July 1886 – 31 December 1899

Personal details
- Born: George Taubman Goldie; 20 May 1846 Douglas, Isle of Man
- Died: 25 August 1925 (aged 79) London, Middlesex, England
- Resting place: Brompton Cemetery
- Spouse: Matilda Catherine Elliott (m. 1870; died 1898)
- Children: Alice Goldie-Taubman; Valentine Francis Goldie-Taubman
- Awards: Livingstone Medal (1906)

Sir George Dashwood Taubman Goldie KCMG FRS (20 May 1846 – 20 August 1925) was a Manx administrator who played a major role in the founding of Colonial Nigeria. In many ways, his role was similar to that of Cecil Rhodes elsewhere in Africa but he did not seek publicity.

== Early life ==
George Goldie descended from an old Scottish family. Born at The Nunnery, Douglas in the Isle of Man, the youngest son of Lieutenant Colonel John Taubman Goldie-Taubman, Speaker of the House of Keys, by his second wife, Caroline Everina, daughter of John Eykyn Hovenden, a barrister of Hemingford Grey, Huntingdonshire. Sir George resumed his paternal name, Goldie, by Royal Licence in 1887.

He was educated at the Royal Military Academy, Woolwich, and for about two years held a commission in the Royal Engineers. Unusually for the time, Goldie was a convinced atheist.

In 1870, he married, Matilda (later known as "Maude") Catherine, daughter of John William Elliott of Wakefield. He travelled in all parts of Africa, gaining an extensive knowledge of the continent, and first visited the country of the Niger in 1877.

== The National African Company ==
He conceived the idea of adding to the British Empire the then little known regions of the lower and middle Niger, and for over twenty years his efforts were devoted to the realization of this conception. The method by which he determined to work was the revival of government by chartered companies within the empire, a method supposed to be buried with the British East India Company. The first step was to combine all British commercial interests in the Niger, and this he accomplished in 1879 when the United African Company was formed.

In 1881, Goldie sought a charter from Gladstone's government. Objections of various kinds were raised. To meet them the capital of the company (renamed the National African Company) was increased from £250,000 to £1,000,000, and great energy was displayed in founding stations on the Niger.

At this time French traders, encouraged by Léon Gambetta, established themselves on the lower river, thus rendering it difficult for the company to obtain territorial rights; but the Frenchmen were bought out in 1884, so that at the Berlin Conference on West Africa in 1885, Goldie, present as an expert on matters relating to the river, was able to announce that on the lower Niger the British flag alone flew. Meantime the Niger coast line had been placed under British protection. Through Joseph Thomson, David McIntosh, D. W. Sargent, J. Flint, William Wallace, E. Dangerfield and numerous other agents, over 400 political treaties drawn up by Goldie were made with the chiefs of the lower Niger and the Hausa states. The scruples of the British government being overcome, a charter was at length granted (July 1886), the National African Company becoming the Royal Niger Company, with Henry Austin Bruce, 1st Baron Aberdare as governor and Goldie as vice-governor. In 1895, on Lord Aberdare's death, Goldie became governor of the company, whose destinies he had guided throughout.

== German opposition ==
The building up of Nigeria as a British state had to be carried on in face of further difficulties raised by French travellers with political missions, and also in face of German opposition. From 1884 to 1890, Otto von Bismarck was a persistent antagonist, and the strenuous efforts he made to secure for Germany the basin of the lower Niger and Lake Chad were even more dangerous to Goldie's schemes of empire than the ambitions of France. Eduard Robert Flegel, who had travelled in Nigeria during 1882–1884 under the auspices of the British company, was sent out in 1885 by the newly formed German Colonial Society to secure treaties for Germany, which had established itself at Cameroon.

After Flegel's death in 1886, his work was continued by his companion Dr Staudinger, while Herr Hoenigsberg was despatched to stir up trouble in the occupied portions of the company's territory, or, as he expressed it, "to burst up the charter". He was finally arrested at Onitsha, and, after trial by the company's supreme court at Asaba, was expelled from the country. Bismarck then sent out his nephew, Herr von Puttkamer, as German consul general to Nigeria, with orders to report on this affair, and when, this report was published in a White Book, Bismarck demanded heavy damages from the company.

Meanwhile, Bismarck maintained constant pressure on the British government to compel the Royal Niger Company to a division of spheres of influence, whereby Great Britain would have lost a third, and the most valuable part, of the company's territory. But he fell from power in March 1890 and, in July, following Robert Gascoyne-Cecil, 3rd Marquess of Salisbury, concluded the Heligoland–Zanzibar Treaty with Germany. The aggressive action of Germany in Nigeria entirely ceased, and the door was opened for a final settlement of the Nigeria–Cameroon frontiers.

These negotiations, which resulted in an agreement in 1893, were initiated by Goldie as a means of arresting the advance of France into Nigeria from the direction of the Congo. By conceding to Germany a long but narrow strip of territory between Adamawa and Lake Chad, to which she had no treaty claims, a barrier was raised against French expeditions, semi-military and semi-exploratory, which sought to enter Nigeria from the east. Later French efforts at aggression were made from the western or Dahomeyan side, despite an agreement concluded with France in 1890 respecting the northern frontier.

== The end of the Company ==
The hostility of certain Fula princes led the company to despatch, in 1897, an expedition against the Muslim states of Nupe and Ilorin. This expedition was organized and personally directed by Goldie and was completely successful. Internal peace was thus secured, but in the following year the differences with France in regard to the frontier line became acute, and compelled the intervention of the British government.

In the negotiations which ensued Goldie was instrumental in preserving for Great Britain the whole of the navigable stretch of the lower Niger. It was, however, evidently impossible for a chartered company to hold its own against the state-supported protectorates of France and Germany, and in consequence, on 1 January 1900, the Royal Niger Company transferred its territories to the British government for the sum of £865,000. The ceded territory together with the small Niger Coast Protectorate, already under imperial control, was formed into the two protectorates of Northern and Southern Nigeria.

== Later enterprises ==
In 1903–1904, at the request of the Chartered Company of South Africa, Goldie visited Rhodesia and examined the situation in connection with the agitation for self-government by the Rhodesians. In 1902–1903 he was one of the Royal Commissioners who inquired into the military preparations for the war in South Africa (1899–1902) and into the operations up to the occupation of Pretoria, and in 1905–1906 was a member of the Royal Commission which investigated the methods of disposal of war stores after peace had been made.

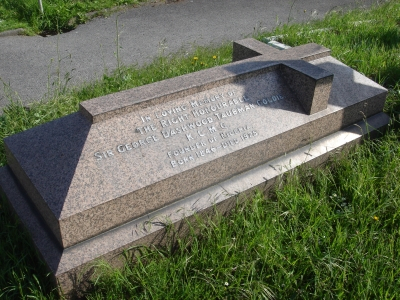
Gravestone, Brompton Cemetery, London

== Later life ==
Sir George Goldie died in 1925 at the age of 79 and is buried in Brompton Cemetery in London. He was survived by two children. His wife's name on the tombstone is Lady Maude Goldie (1847–1898), reflecting her evident use of an alternative form of the name originating in Old German, 'Matilda' being the Latin form; the same was the case with the Empress Matilda.

== Honours ==
In 1905, he was elected President of the Royal Geographical Society and held that office for three years. In 1908 he was chosen as an Alderman of the London County Council. Goldie was created KCMG in 1887, and a Privy Councillor in 1898.

He became a Fellow of the Royal Society (1902), Honorary D.C.L. of the University of Oxford (1897) and Honorary LL.D. of the University of Cambridge (1897). In 1906, he was awarded the RSGS Livingstone Medal for his contribution to Geography

Sir George was also at some point Vice President of the Royal Colonial Institute.

- Pseudohaje goldii (Goldie's tree cobra), a rare West African venomous snake, was named in Goldie's honour by George Albert Boulenger in 1895.

== In popular culture ==
Goldie was played by Scottish actor Ian McDiarmid in the 2016 historical drama The Lost City of Z.
