= Eduard Robert Flegel =

German explorer

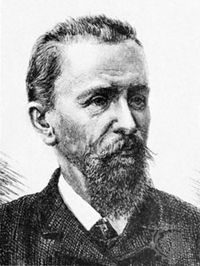
Eduard Robert Flegel

Eduard Robert Flegel (13 October 1855 – 11 September 1886) was a German explorer who played an important role in the Scramble for Africa.

== Life ==
Born in Vilna, Lithuania, Flegel trained as a merchant before travelling to Lagos in 1875, where, in 1879 opportunity arose to take part in an expedition along the River Niger, which penetrated to about 125 miles beyond the farthest point hitherto explored.

At the behest of the German African Society, which commissioned him to explore the entire Benue River basin, Flegel undertook further study of the Benue, and in 1880 travelled up the Niger to Sokoto. There, he obtained leave from the sultan for an expedition to the Adamawa Plateau. During his exploration of the Benue, he identified its source at Ngaundere in 1882.

After a brief sojourn in Europe, Flegel returned to Africa on a commission from the German African Society to open the Niger-Benue district to German trade. His efforts were largely unsuccessful as he arrived to find the district occupied by George Taubman Goldie's National African Company, and it maintained its ascendancy. Although very ill, he attempted the ascent of the Benue, but turned back at Yola and died soon after arriving at the coast.

== Works ==
- Lose Blätter aus dem Tagebuch meiner Haussa-Freunde und Reisegefährten (Loose Leaves from the Diary of My Hausa Friends and Travel Companions; Hamburg, 1885)
- Vom Niger-Benüe; Briefe aus Afrika (Concerning the Niger-Benue; Letters from Africa; Leipzig, 1890)
