= New Orphan Houses, Ashley Down =

Orphanage in Bristol, England

Coordinates: 51°28′41″N 2°34′48″W

The New Orphan Houses, Ashley Down, commonly known as the Muller Homes, were an orphanage in the district of Ashley Down, in the north of Bristol. They were built between 1849 and 1870 by the Prussian evangelist George Müller to show the world that God not only heard, but answered, prayers. The five Houses held 2,050 children at any one time and some 17,000 passed through their doors before the buildings were sold to Bristol City Council in 1958.

== Background ==
original orphan houses

The work of George Müller and his wife with orphans began in 1836 with the preparation of their own home at 6 Wilson Street, Bristol for the accommodation of thirty girls. At that time, there were very few orphanages in the country - there was accommodation for only 3,600 orphans in England. Orphans tended to go to "homes for foundlings" or the workhouses, which were akin to slave labour. In his Annual Report for 1861, Müller informs that there is still "entirely inadequate accommodation" in the UK and that admission was by votes for most of the available homes. This, he said, made it "difficult, if not impossible, for the poorest and most destitute of persons, to avail themselves of them. ... .. Thousands of votes, sometimes even many thousands, are required, in order that the candidate should be successful. But the really poor and destitute have neither time, nor money, nor ability, nor influence, to set about canvassing for votes; and therefore, with rare exceptions, they derive no benefit from such Institutions". Although Müller ran the orphanage on Christian principles, no regard was made to the religious denomination of the orphan. Müller's only requirements for admission were that the child be born in wedlock, that both parents were dead and that the child be in needy circumstances.

== Early days ==
On 20 November 1835, Müller had it in mind to open an orphan house in Bristol to prove that God not only existed but that He heard and answered prayer, and Müller set about doing so on 21 November. He prayed that he might be given £40 as an encouragement but by 23 November he received gifts of around £50 from unexpected sources. His reasons for establishing this work were "1. That God may be glorified, should He be pleased to furnish me with the means, in its being seen that it is not a vain thing to trust in Him; and that thus the faith of His children may be strengthened. 2. The spiritual welfare of fatherless and motherless children. 3. Their temporal welfare." He took inspiration from the large orphanage established in the 18th century by AH Francke at Halle, Germany. A public meeting was held at which Müller announced his intentions but that he would be making no appeal to any man for funding. It was his intention to receive only children who had lost both parents through death, to train girls for domestic service and boys for a trade. He prayed for £1,000 and staff to run the home, together with premises from which to operate. Although the £1,000 had yet to be received, 6 Wilson Street was fitted up for the orphans, Mr and Mrs Müller moving to 14 Wilson Street, and, on 11 April 1836, the first girls moved in. By 21 April, 26 children had taken up residence.

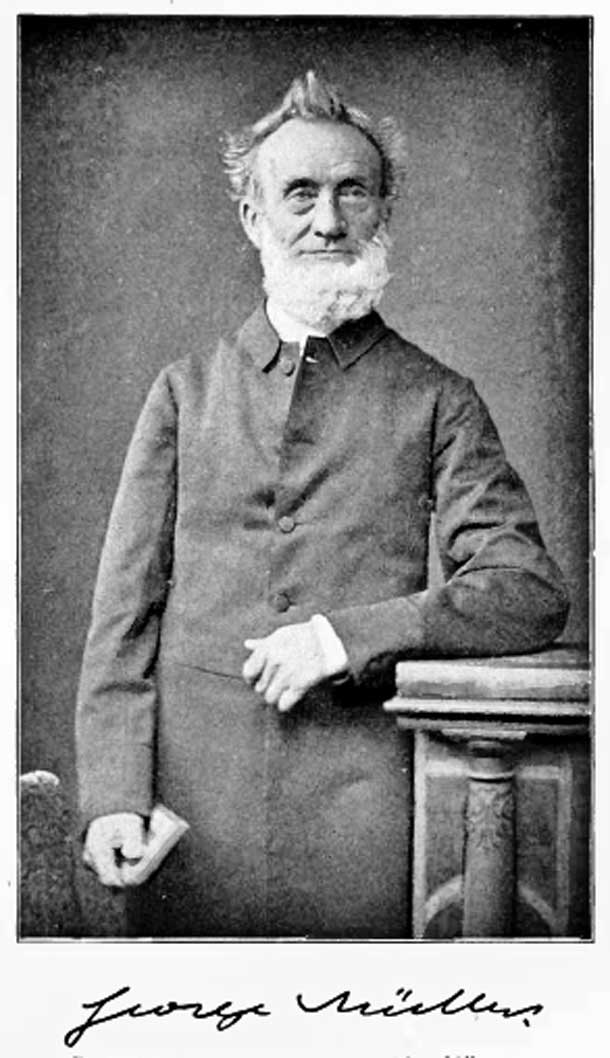
George Müller

Due to the number of applications being made to receive infants, a second house in Wilson Street, No 1, was rented, and this opened on 28 November 1836 for the care of infants. A piece of ground for use as a playground was also acquired. By 15 June 1837, the £1,000 prayed for had been received in full, by which time a considerable number of items had also been donated, either for use or for selling. It was now time to consider opening a third house in order to take orphaned boys into care. A large, cheap house in another area was found and a rental agreement was signed in late summer, but the neighbours objected and threatened the landlord with legal action so Müller withdrew on 5 October. That same day, he received £50 from a poor woman for the express purpose of furnishing a house for orphan boys. Müller took this as proof that God still wanted him to open a third house and, indeed, premises were secured on 21 October 1837 at No 3 Wilson Street for this purpose. A fourth house, No 4 Wilson Street, was opened for the reception of orphans in early July 1843.

== The Move to Ashley Down ==
On 30 October 1845, a letter was received from one of the neighbours, written on behalf of other residents in Wilson Street, complaining "in kind and courteous terms" about the serious inconvenience being caused by the presence of so many children. Müller went to prayer concerning this, and believed that God was directing him to buy land on which to build a purpose-built orphanage.

The cost of building an orphan house for 300 children was £10,000. The very first donation for this new project was £1,000, received on 10 December 1845. "When I received it," Müller said, "I was as calm, as quiet, as if I had received one shilling; for my heart was looking out for answers. Day by day I was expecting to receive answers to my prayers; therefore, having faith concerning the matter, this donation did not in the least surprise me." Before the month was over, a second donation of £1,000 was received - more than one-fifth of the required sum had been received in the two months since Müller started praying. He continued his supplication to God and, amongst other unsolicited gifts, a single donation of £2,000 came in during the following summer, with another lump sum of £1,000 in the December. On 25 January 1847, Müller asked God to provide the balance of the required funds "soon". Within an hour, another single donation of £2,000 was handed in. The building fund now stood at £9,285 3s 9½d and topped £11,000 before the end of May that year.

Müller then prayed for the land on which to build and was guided to a 7-acre (28,000 m^{2}) site in Ashley Down surrounded by fields, on sale at £200 an acre. He went to the landowner's home to speak to him, but was told that the owner was at his place of business. Müller duly went there to be told that the owner had returned home. Müller returned to his own home having left his card. The following morning, the landowner called to say that he'd had a sleepless night and believed that God was telling him to sell the land to Müller for £120 an acre. In 1845 Müller entered into a contract for the purchase of 7 acres (28,000 m^{2}) of ground at £120 per acre (£0.03/m^{2}) for "the accommodation, feeding, clothing and education of 300 destitute and orphan children". Three days later, local Christian architect Thomas Foster, asked if he might prepare plans and supervise the work gratuitously. On 25 January 1847, just over a year since he started praying for the building costs, Müller's records show that the building fund held £9,285 - all unsolicited gifts. The building was estimated to cost £10,000 to build but Müller did not enter into any contract until this sum had been received. Instead of starting the work, he waited until the full amount was in hand, and a few months later a further gift of £1,000 was received, giving him more than enough to erect the building. The cornerstone of what became known as The New Orphan House was laid on 19 August 1847. As it neared completion, Müller gave thought to the need for furnishings and again prayed. Shortly afterwards, he received a single donation of £2,000. The donor was so anxious to remain anonymous that he came to Müller and gave the £2,000 in cash.

On 18 June 1849 the 118 orphans living in Wilson Street transferred to the new building. Müller waited for a month, to ascertain the costs of running the House, before accepting any further children - 170 new children were then admitted. Eleven trustees were appointed and the deeds enrolled at Chancery.

== Expansion of the work ==
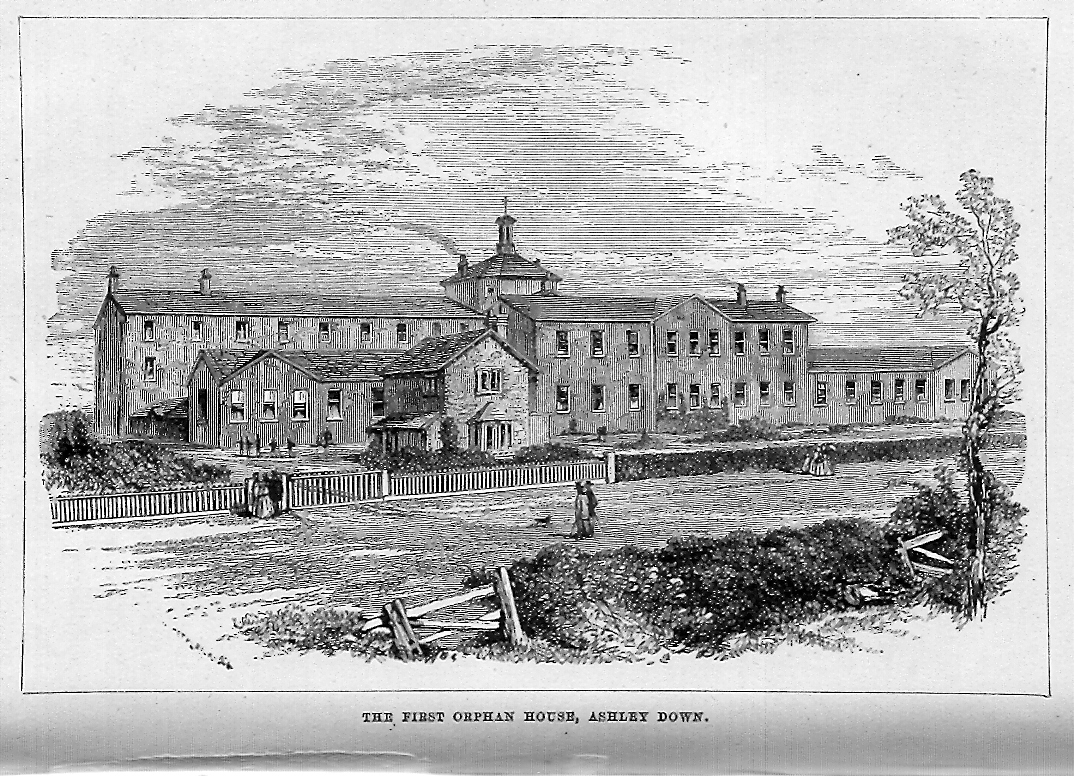
The first Orphan House at Ashley Down

Some eighteen months later, Müller started to think about erecting a second House - he first discusses this in his journal on 5 December 1850. He mentions it again on 4 January 1851, when he receives a single donation of £3,000, Again, after much prayer, he made public his intention, on 28 May 1851, to build a second home for orphans. The cost was estimated to be £27,000 for land and construction, and another £8,000 for furnishing. Twelve months later, only £3,530 - a tenth of the amount required - had been received, but Müller was not discouraged. By the end of the fourth year, the building fund stood at just over £23,059.

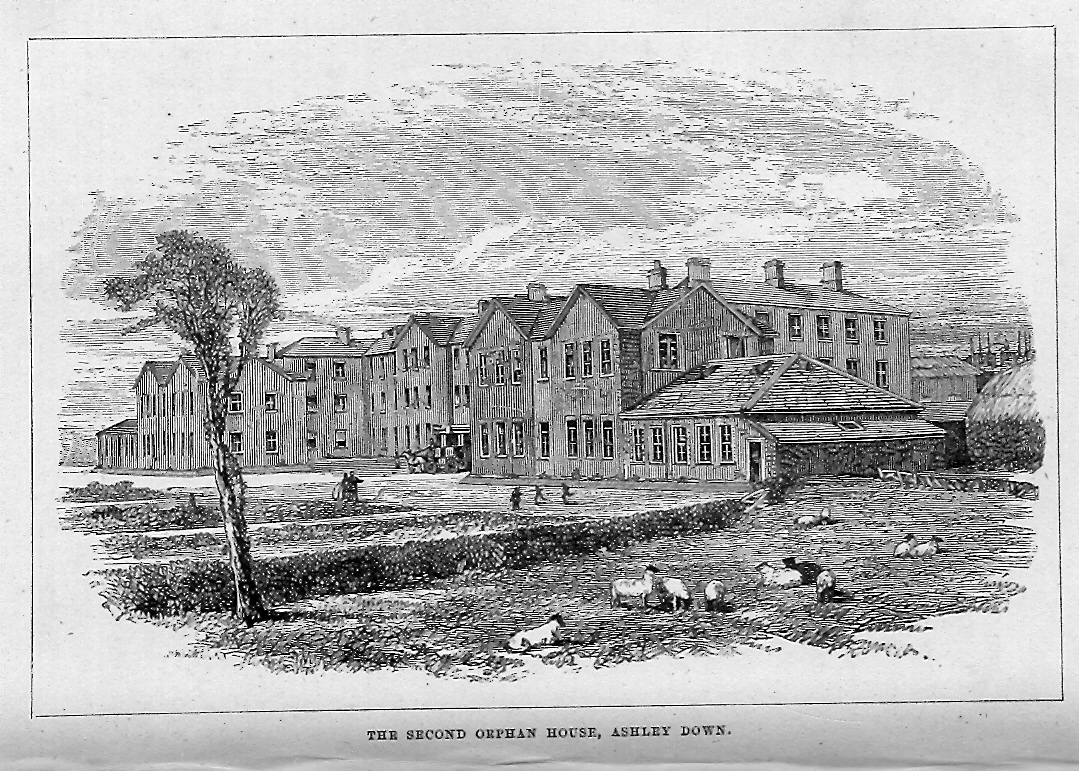
The second Orphan House at Ashley Down

It was his original intention to build a home for 700 children but he found that the surrounding fields could not be sold at that time, under a clause in the late owner's will, so the plans were changed to build a smaller house for 400 children on the existing ground he owned, to the south of No 1 House. Building work started on 29 May 1855, and seven months later received a boost when a local glazier asked if he could provide all the glass for 300 large windows gratuitously.

At the end of the financial year, 26 May 1856, the building fund had a balance of just under £29,300. Müller came back from visiting the finished building on 18 September 1857 to find another unsolicited cheque for £1,000 had been left for the fund. Further sums came in and by 26 May 1858, £35,000 was to hand - sufficient to build a third house, which would take the number of orphans who could be accommodated to 1,000.

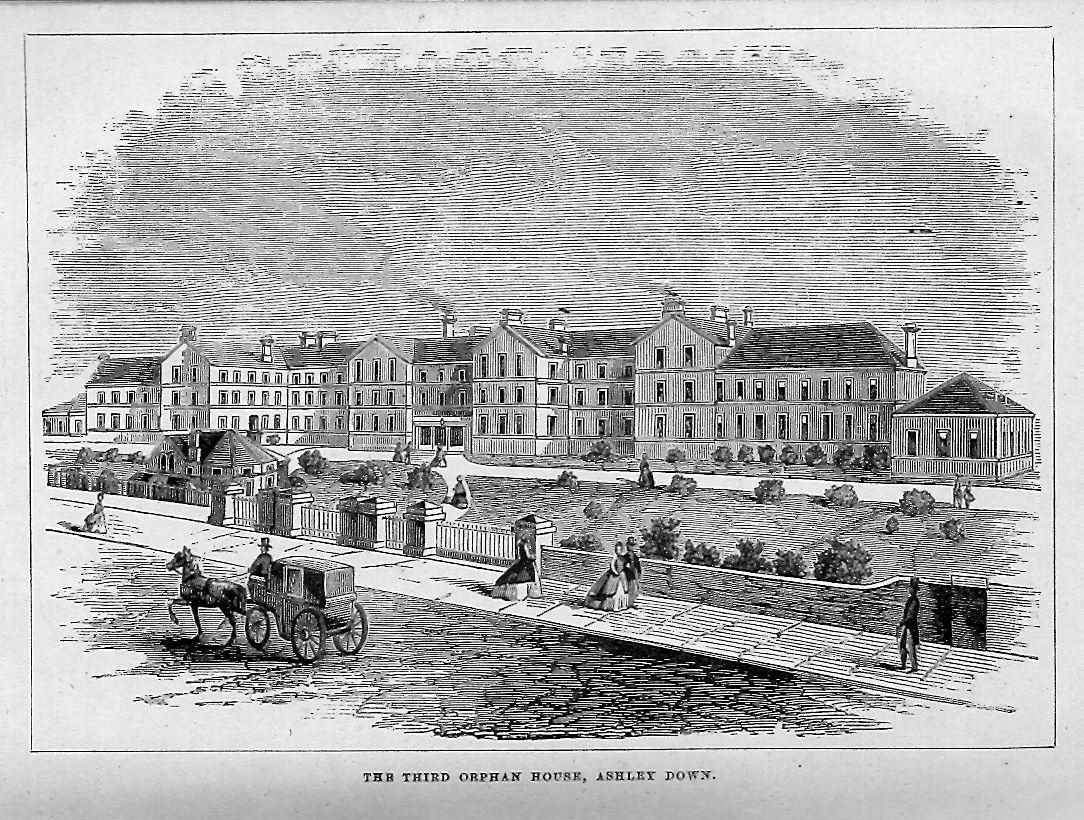
The third Orphan House at Ashley Down

On 2 February 1858, plans started to be made for the erection of the third orphan house. Many significant donations were received during this time but on 20 June 1858, from a previously unknown benefactor, came a gift of £3,500, of which £3,350 was to be put to the building fund. The donor wished it to be sent before his imminent death to avoid delay and tax. In September a site of eleven and a half acres was purchased, just across the road from the existing buildings, at a cost of £3,631 15s.

Müller's original plan was to accommodate 300 orphans on this site but felt that better use would be made if 400 could be housed. After discussions with the architects, however, he found that, for a little extra expense, he could build for 450 children instead. He at once prayed for the provision of the extra funds required and, on 4 January 1859, received a gift of £7,000, £4,000 of which he set aside for the building fund. Two days later £300 came in from an anonymous donor with the promise of a further £8900 later in the year. On 1 February, two gifts totalling £2,700 were received, of which £700 was applied to the fund. By the end of May, the fund held £41,911 15s 11d and, in early July, the construction work started.

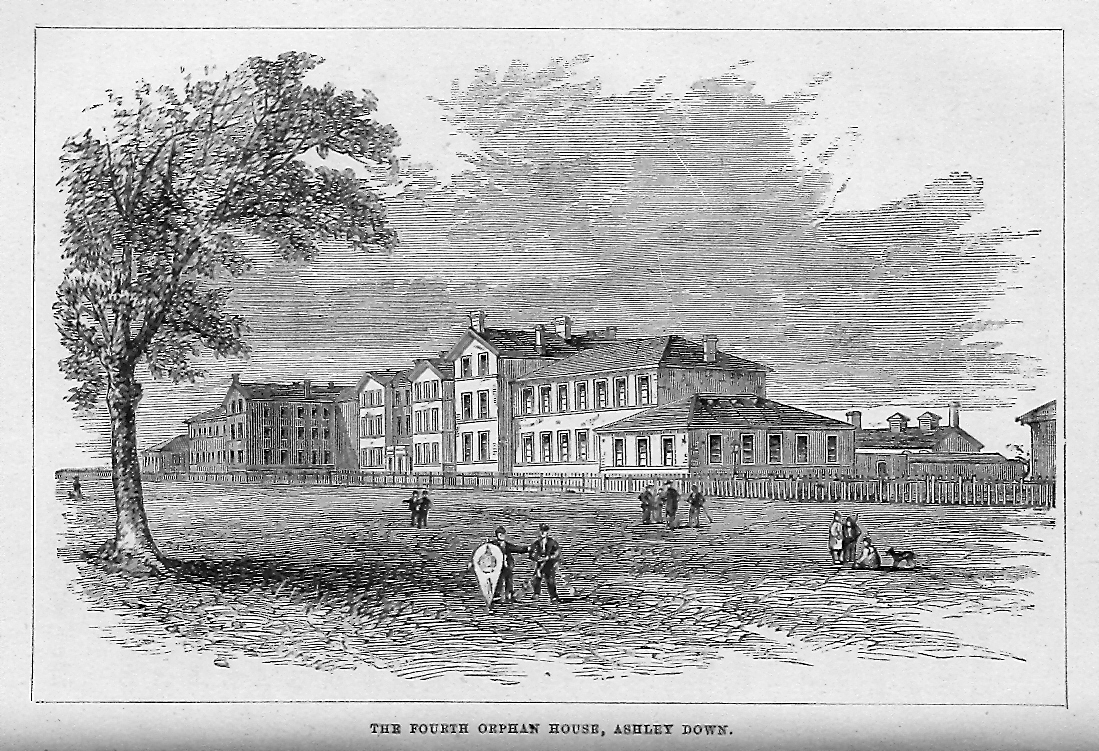
The fourth Orphan House at Ashley Down

The building was completed and opened its doors to orphans on 12 March 1862. It was, like the other two Houses, plain in appearance. W Elfe Tayler reports that it contained 94 rooms, 36 on the ground floor, 35 on the first floor and 23 on the second floor. Two 90 feet (27 m) long dormitories each held 50 beds. Mr Haden of Trowbridge, an eminent heating engineer, installed modern and efficient kitchen and laundry equipment, together with ventilation and heating systems.

Before New Orphan House No 3 was even opened, Müller contemplated expanding the work even further by building two more houses capable of holding another 850 children. It was estimated that to do so would cost at the very least £50,000. As well as expecting God to provide this, Müller also prayed that the increased running costs, from £20,000 to £35,000 annually, be sent.

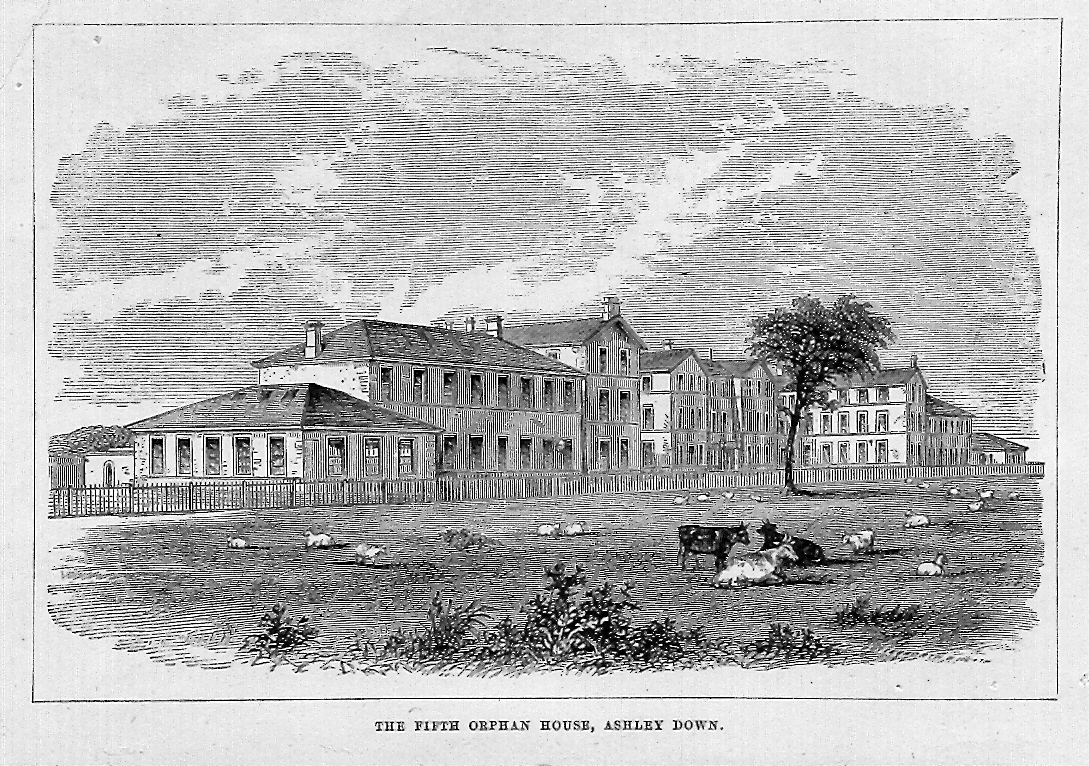
The fifth Orphan House at Ashley Down

After much further prayer, Müller received the first donation for this latest expansion on 6 June 1861: five rupees, six annas, three seams, three Spanish coins, and three other silver coins". By 3 November 1864, the building fund held over £27,000, including just under £3,000 left over from the fund to build No 3 House. The land Müller desired for the next two houses was separated from No 2 House by a turnpike road and he found that it was for sale. However, it would not be available for a further 28 months, due to an existing lease agreement. Furthermore, the landowner was asking £7,000 - more than Müller considered it to be worth. As if this wasn't enough, the Bristol Water Works Company intended to use the site on which to construct a reservoir. Müller was unfazed by these obstacles and submitted them to God in prayer. His supplications were quickly answered. The tenant willingly accepted an offer of compensation for giving up the lease. The owner agreed to accept £5,500 instead of £7,000. The water company said that they only required a small portion of the site and, if avoidable, they wouldn't even take that. It would have been disadvantageous to start building one house before the other, so Müller waited until he had sufficient funds to start both houses together. By the end of May 1865, the fund balance stood at just over £24,635, and one year later Müller had £34,002 available. It was then discovered that the cost would exceed the estimate by £8,000, due to increase in labour and material costs. As Müller could not sign the contract for both without the full amount to hand, it was agreed that the contractors would tender separately for the two buildings. The contract for No 4 House was, therefore, signed with an option of accepting the contract for No 5 on or before 1 January 1867. Work started on No 4 on 7 May 1866. The balance of funds needed for No 5 were to hand by 31 December 1866 and the contract was duly signed. This last house started to be built on 15 January 1867. By 1 February 1868, all the money required to build and furnish the two houses had been received. The 700 large windows were glazed gratuitously by a firm. No 4 House accepted its first child on 5 November 1868, with No 5 following on 6 January 1870. There were now living at Ashley Down some 2,050 children and 112 staff.

In 1868, figures were published detailing the amount and types of materials used to build the last two houses: 36,000 tons of building stone; 15,000 tons of freestone; 14,000 tons of lime and ashes; 10,000 tons of timber; 2 acres (8,100 m^{2}) of deal boarding; one and a half acres of paving; 10 acres (40,000 m^{2}) of plastering; 2 acres (8,100 m^{2}) of slating; four and half acres of painting; quarter of an acre of glazing; one and three-quarter miles of rainwater pipes and three miles (5 km) of drain pipes. The cost of construction was put at £115,000.

== Funding ==
The total amount of money and articles to be sold, received by Mr Müller without any form of fund-raising and purely as a result of prayer, from the inception of the work in 1835 to 26 May 1870, was as follows:

Description	£	s	d
Amount received for support of the Orphans, to 26 May 1870	199,926	9	11^{1}/_{2}
Income for the erection of the first Orphan House	15,784	18	10
Income for the erection of the second and third Orphan Houses	45,882	18	6^{3}/_{4}
Income for the erection of the fourth and fifth Orphan Houses	57,810	3	2^{1}/_{4}
Total	£319,404	10	6^{1}/_{2}

Even though he constantly prayed for, and expected to receive, funds, not every gift was immediately accepted. In 1853, an old widow sold her house for £90 and put it in the Orphan donation box in her local church anonymously. The church treasurer knew that she had received £90 for her house and surmised that this money had come from her. He sent two colleagues to talk to her, but she would only retract £5 and so the treasurer forwarded the balance to Müller. Müller then wrote to the widow and paid her travelling expenses to Bristol in order that he might interview her to ascertain her motives. She insisted that she had resolved some 10 years previously to give the proceeds of her house to the orphan work, saying "God has always provided for me and I have no doubt he will do so in the future also". Müller then accepted the money from her but still would not apply it to the work - instead, he kept it aside for seven months and wrote to the widow again offering the return of the money. She refused to hear of it.

Müller never made requests for financial support, nor did he go into debt, even though the five homes cost over £100,000 to build. By the time he died in 1898, Müller had received £1,500,000 through prayer and had had over 10,000 children in his care.

He mentioned in each Annual Report that God had protected the buildings from fire and other calamity - "Though erected and fitted up at an expense of £115,000, they were never insured in any Company, but simply committed to the care of our Heavenly Father, who is our Helper and Friend."

== Health ==
Several children died each year (perhaps as many as 14 each year) but comparisons cannot be made with life expectancy outside the orphanage. Many parents died from tuberculosis, and many of the children who were admitted were suffering themselves from the disease, which was the chief cause of mortality in the homes. Müller commented that most weak children soon enjoyed improved health not long after they entered the home, and this was probably due to the high standards of hygiene and regular, nourishing meals available in the homes. Before long, children had to be certified as being free from any infection before admittance was granted. Each House had an infirmary on the top floor, where the children were cared for. They would receive extra milk, bread and butter mid-mornings and excused physical work.

In 1862, an outbreak of smallpox was confirmed in the local area which lasted for two years before the infection spread to the Orphanage. Although there were 320 children in No 1 House, only 10 at any one time were taken ill, and then only mildly. The disease then manifested itself in No 2 House, where there were 400 children but only 11 suffered a light touch of the pox. No 3 House did not escape and of the 450 children, 15 were taken ill but, again, none seriously. None of the children died and the disease disappeared in December 1864.

Scarlet Fever broke out in September 1865 and infected 36 of the 200 infants in No 2 House. Three children caught the disease in No 3 House but none of the orphans at Ashley Down died. Whooping Cough then appeared the 450 girls in No 3 during December 1865, which then spread to the other two houses. Although many children in Bristol died of Whooping Cough at this time, only one orphan girl died, and she was known to have weak lungs and a tendency to consumption.

In 1884, there were many cases of typhoid fever, and Müller asked for the water in the homes' wells to be tested. Dr Davis, Bristol's sanitary officer, found the supply to be pure but, nevertheless, recommended that the homes be connected to the municipal supply. Work to accomplish this was started in the summer and took many months to complete.

== Food ==
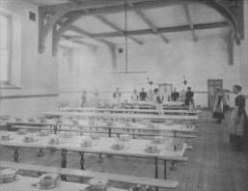
Dining hall at Ashley Down

By today's standards, meals were inadequate and monotonous, however by the standards of the day, they were nutritious. Even in a private home, a child might expect to have just bread and milk for breakfast. Müller fed his children bread, with treacle or dripping; oatmeal; potatoes and other vegetables; stew; corned beef; rice. W Elfe Taylor notes that "The food of the Orphans at breakfast is always oatmeal porridge; they use milk with it. No doubt this wholesome food is one cause of the healthy, ruddy appearance of the Orphans generally; for notwithstanding a strong prejudice against it in this country, a more wholesome, nutritious article of diet certainly does not exist. The dinner provided for the children varies almost every day. Monday there is boiled beef; Tuesday, soup, with a good proportion of meat in it; Wednesday, rice-milk with treacle, Thursday they have boiled leg of mutton; the following day they have soup again, and on Saturday bacon; on Sundays they always dine on rice with treacle in order that as few as possible may be kept from attending public worship. The Orphans breakfast at eight o’clock, dine at one, and take tea at six."

The boys cultivated the land around the homes to grow their own vegetables, to help reduce expenditure as well as training them for later life. A former orphan wrote, in 1931, "What a witness to the loving care of our Heavenly Father. I was in the schools Nos 2 and 3 eight years. Someone lately asked me if we were ever short of food while there. I said "No". Never one meal was missing, neither did we think there would be, for we knew in whom we trusted.". On many occasions, there would either be no money for food, or no food in the Houses, and yet no meal was ever missed. On one occasion, the children gave thanks for breakfast, even though there was nothing to eat in the house. As they finished praying, the baker knocked on the door with sufficient fresh bread to feed everyone. This was a rare treat, as normally bread was two days old (and thus stale) when purchased, in order to conserve funds. At other times, an unsolicited gift of money would arrive in time for supplies to be purchased.

== Clothing ==
The older boys were given a navy blue Eton jacket, with a waistcoat that buttoned up to a white collar, both of heavy serge. Their trousers were of brown corduroy and a glazed-peak cap completed the uniform. Each boy had three suits.

The smaller boys, up to 8–9 years old, were given a cotton smock, blue serge shorts and strap shoes for everyday use. For special occasions, they wore Norfolk suits with broad Eton collars, and the same caps as their elders.

The boys had to learn how to knit their own socks.

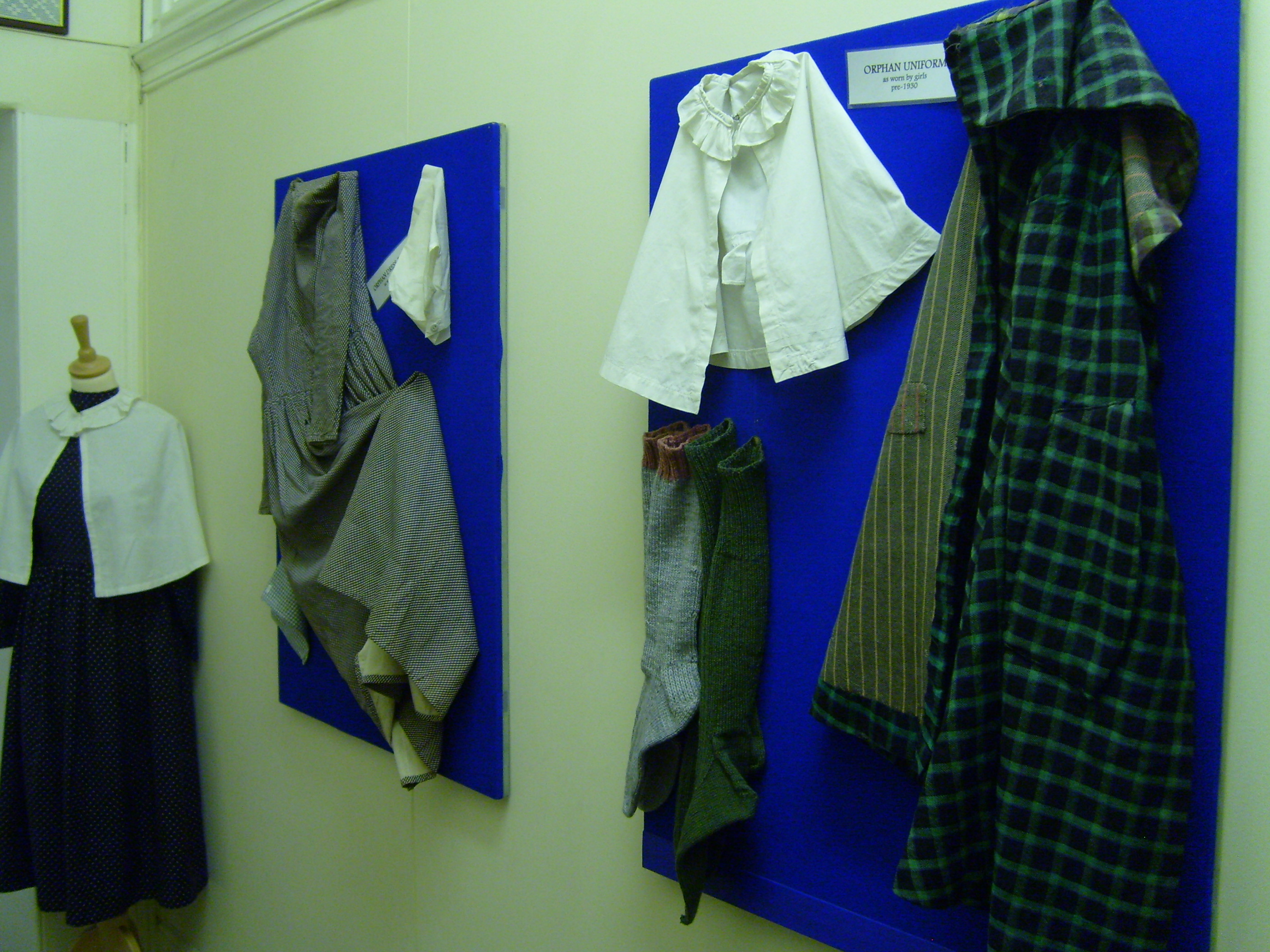
Selection of girls' uniforms at the Müller House museum

The girls wore long green and blue plaid cloaks in cold weather, and a shepherd's plaid shawl in warm weather. Their summer walking out dresses were dull lilac cotton with a small cape or tippet. A straw bonnet was worn all year, to which was attached a green and white check ribbon for tying the bonnet on. Everyday wear was provided for by navy cotton dresses with white polka dots. Girls up to the age of 14 wore blue-checked gingham pinafores indoors, after this they added aprons and were promoted to "House Girls". As part of their domestic training, the girls made their own clothes.

The nursery infants tended to wear whatever baby clothes had been donated.

The uniforms remained the same until 1936, when the girls started to wear knee-length skirts and "hats like pudding basins".

== Education ==
Each House contained its own school rooms and Müller employed a number of teachers amongst his staff. The children were instructed in Scripture, reading, writing, arithmetic, English grammar, history, geography, Swedish drill and singing. The girls were taught sewing and all the children learned how to knit. The boys had to knit themselves three pairs of socks as part of their leaving outfit. Müller even employed a schools inspector to maintain high standards. In fact, many claimed that nearby factories and mines were unable to obtain enough workers because of his efforts in securing apprenticeships, professional training, and domestic service positions for the children old enough to leave the orphanage. Boys left Ashley Down at the age of 14, while girls of the same age moved from the classroom to spend their final three years in what was, effectively, a domestic science school. They helped with the cleaning, cooking, laundering, dressmaking, and parlour-maid duties, while others helped in the nursery and infirmary. These girls were paid 6d a week, although threepence of this was banked on their behalf to build up a cash sum to be given on their eventual departure.

In September 1951, the Bristol Education Committee assumed responsibility for educating the children at Ashley Down.

== Daily routine ==
06:00	Rise, finish washing and dressing, older children helping the younger
07:00	Girls knitting, boys reading
08:00	Breakfast
08:30	Morning service
09:00	School (some older children first help to make beds etc. to 09:30)
12:30	Playtime
13:00	Dinner
14:00	School
16:00	Playtime
17:30	Evening service
18:00	Tea
18:30	"useful work" - girls "at their needle", boys in the garden
20:00	Younger children to bed
21:00	Older children to bed

The author, Charles Dickens, heard a rumour that the orphans were being mistreated and came down from London unannounced to verify this. Initially, Müller refused to grant access as it was not one of the days set aside to receive visitors to the Homes, but Dickens refused to leave. It is unclear whether Müller showed Dickens around himself, or if he gave Dickens a bunch of keys and invited him to go around the homes, or if he asked one of the orphans to guide Dickens round, but Dickens went back to London and wrote a fulsome report on the activities of the orphan houses in his publication "Household Words". Müller makes no mention of this visit in his writings.

There were three events each year that were marked for celebration: Mr Müller's birthday on 27 September, Christmas, and the Pur Down summer outing.

The week of 27 September was a holiday and the day itself marked by a cake.

Pur Down was a mile and a half away, and the children would walk there in a long procession, each carrying a small cloth bag containing biscuits and sweets.

Christmas was an especially happy time. Each House had a large Christmas tree to decorate and every child had a present. Staff opened small sweet shops in each of the buildings, where the children were allowed to spend 8d on sweets that were purchased from local manufacturers and sold at cost.

== Conditions of Reception ==
From the outset, only children who had been born in wedlock, were bereft of both parents through death and were destitute would be considered for admission.

By the end of the nineteenth century, the equivalent of one and a half houses were standing empty and the decision was taken to start admitting "partial" orphans - i.e. those who had lost only one parent and the survivor was unable to cope. Priority was always given to full orphans. The first "partial" orphan was admitted on 1 August 1901.

Boys were accepted up to age 10, girls to age 12 subject to satisfactory school and home reports.

On 13 May 1948, in view of diminishing numbers of children in the orphanage, the Trustees took the decision to accept any needy child, irrespective of whether they were born in wedlock or, indeed, even orphaned.

== Leaving ==
Müller stated in his Annual Reports (this particular one from the 1889 report):

"The girls who are received into the establishment, are kept till they are able to go to service. Our aim is to keep them till they shall have been sufficiently qualified for situations, and especially, also, till they are strong enough to go out, as far as we are able to judge. We uniformly prefer fitting the girls for service, instead of apprenticing them to businesses, as being generally far better for their bodies and their souls. Only in a few instances have female Orphans been apprenticed to a business, when their health would not allow them to go to service. If the girls give us satisfaction, while under our care, so that we can recommend them to a situation, they are fitted-out at the expense of the Institution. The girls generally remain under our care till they are 17 years old. They rarely leave sooner; and, as we receive children from their earliest days, we have often had girls 13, 14, and even 17 years under our care. They are instructed in reading, writing, arithmetic, English grammar, geography, English history, a little of universal history, all kinds of useful needlework, and household work. They make their clothes and keep them in repair; they work in the kitchens, sculleries, wash-houses, and laundries; and, in a word, we aim at this, that, if any of them do not turn out well, temporally or spiritually, and do not become useful members of society, it shall not at least be our fault. The boys are, generally, apprenticed when they are between 14 and 15 years old; but in each case we consider the welfare of the individual Orphan, without having any fixed rule respecting these matters. The boys have a free choice of the trade or business they like to learn; but, having once chosen, and having been apprenticed, we do not allow them to alter. The boys, as well as the girls, have an outfit provided for them, and any other expenses, that may be connected with their apprenticeship, are also met by the funds of the Orphan Establishment. As it may be interesting to the reader to know the kind of trades or businesses to which we generally apprentice the boys, I state that, during the last fifty years, all the boys who were apprenticed, were bound to carpenters, or carpenters and joiners, cabinet makers, basket makers, boot and shoe makers, tailors and drapers, plumbers, painters and glaziers, linen drapers, printers, bakers, grocers, hair-dressers, iron-mongers, tin-plate workers, confectioners, hosiers, builders, millers, gas-fitters, smiths, out-fitters, provision dealers, sailmakers, upholsterers, wholesale grocers, chemists, seed merchants, umbrella makers, electro-plate manufacturers, or machine makers. Some have been sent out to become post-office or telegraph clerks. A few also became clerks in offices. The boys have the same kind of mental cultivation as the girls, and learn to knit their stockings. They also make their beds, clean their shoes, scrub their rooms, go on errands and work in the garden around the Orphan Establishment, in the way of digging, planting, weeding &c."

Concerning the boys' apprenticeships, Müller said in the 1863 report:

"we not only look for [applications made by] Christian masters, but consider their business, and examine their position, to see whether they are suitable; but, if all other difficulties were out of the way, the master must also be willing to receive the apprentice into his own family. Under these circumstances, we again gave ourselves to prayer, as we had done for more than twenty years before, concerning this thing, instead of advertising, which, in all probability, would only bring before us masters who desire an apprentice for the sake of the premium."

Suitable children were also trained as teachers and many remained at the Homes, or came back in later years, to work in the classrooms. In later years, some of the girls stayed on as nursing assistants, cooks or clerical staff.

A few of the "full" orphans went back to their extended families, who either wished to look after them themselves or were able to provide employment. Many of the "partial" orphans returned to the surviving parent when that person had either remarried or their circumstances had changed so that they could now look after the child.

When the day came to leave, each child was given a complete outfit, a tin trunk, two changes of clothing, an umbrella, a Bible, a copy of George Müller's "Narratives" (after his death, a copy of his autobiography was given instead), and some money - half a crown for the boys, and the accumulated savings for the girls. They were also given their train ticket.

== Change of Director ==
George Müller died on 10 March 1898, but his son-in-law, James Wright, had already assumed the mantle of director in 1875, when Müller started on his preaching tours.

After Müller's death, the Liverpool Mercury said "How has this wonder been accomplished? Mr Müller has told the world that it was the result of 'PRAYER'. The rationalism of the day will sneer at this declaration; but the facts remain, and remain to be explained. It would be unscientific to belittle historic occurrences when they are difficult to explain, and much juggling would be needed to make the orphanages on Ashley Down vanish from view!". During his life, a total of £988,829 0s 10^{1}/_{2}d had been received in answer to prayer without any human having been asked for money, and without advertising.

The rules for admission to the orphanages were changed on 14 March 1901 so that, from 1 August 1901, destitute children, born in wedlock, who had lost only one parent would be admitted. Since 1869, the number of other orphanages through the country had increased, and the relatives and friends naturally wanted the children to be cared for more locally. This led to a decrease in the number of applications received for the admission of "full" orphans, with a corresponding increase in the number of places available. Rather than close one of the houses, it was therefore decided to admit "partial" orphans.

When James Wright died in 1905, Fred Bergin took up the mantle until his death in 1912, when his son, William, took over.

Alfred Green was appointed Director in 1930, handing over the reins to Thomas Tilsley in 1940. John McCready was the final director at Ashley Down, from 1952.

== Development of the Ashley Down buildings ==
High level tanks were installed in Nos 1 and 2 Houses, to collect rainwater, thus avoiding the need for water to be carried upstairs any more, in the year ending May 1909. The drainage systems of both houses were modernised as well. A hot-air laundry was installed in No 1, while improvements were made to the laundries in the other four houses.

Early in the summer of 1909, an offer was made to build a swimming pool. This was gratefully accepted, construction work began in December and the pool was opened 10 June 1910 in No 5 House. The pool, laundry and caretaker's rooms cost nearly £5,000. Note was made in the Annual Report that, being a gift a "Swimming Bath complete", the amount did not show in the financial statement for that year. A new classroom was completed in No 1 House, and high level tanks to supply soft water were installed in No 3, as well as modernising the drains.

In 1913, a third of the playgrounds was asphalted, as a gift from a supporter.

Modernisation of the toilet facilities in No 5 House were completed in early 1914, and a fourth playground was covered in asphalt - a supporter, again, paying for this work to be completed.

The swimming pool closed during the autumn of 1914 because the Bath Attendant left to join the armed forces. A replacement could not be found and so the pool was taken out of use.

During the war years, the homes were never short of food, although potatoes were unobtainable for a few months in 1917, and haricot beans were unavailable for a considerable period. Material for clothing was still available, but at higher cost and lower quality. Alternatives had to be found to the tin trunks traditionally given to departing children. The numbers of children admitted continued to fall, due to better provision by the Boards of Guardians, higher wages and pension schemes for the children of fallen soldiers.

Following the re-housing of the boys from No 1 House to Nos 2 and 3, part of No 1 House was opened as a nursery. Nineteen babies were cared for there, with room for more. As a result of changes to the regulations on apprenticeships, and the effects of the Depression, difficulty was experienced in obtaining jobs for the boys, so the decision was taken in 1921 to send some to work on farms in Canada. Records show that, of the "full orphans", three lads were sent to the Fegan's Homes Canada Training Farm in Kent between May 1921 and June 1922, but they subsequently did not go to Canada; and two boys were sent to the Salvation Army's UK training farm in April 1923 with a view to going to Canada - it is not known if they actually sailed. Of the "partial orphans", three lads went to Fegan's between June and July 1921 (although the mother of one withdrew him from this scheme as she didn't want him to emigrate); three went directly to the Salvation Army training farm in Toronto on board the SS Empress of France in August 1921; and another four were sent, on 13 April 1923, to the Salvation Army's UK farm for training prior to sailing for Canada.

The swimming pool was re-opened in late 1922.

During 1925-26 electric lighting was installed on the ground floor and infirmaries of Nos 4 and 5 Houses, and work was started to do the same in No 3 House. Two more hot water systems had also been installed. The two fields, which had to be ploughed during the war, were returned to grass for use as playing fields for the children.

By 1932, the occupancy of the homes had been re-organised, so that all the boys (except for infants) were accommodated in No 4 House and a new Nursery was opened in No 3 House. The children's uniforms were also modernised. The cloaks and poke bonnets worn by the girls were replaced by coats and hats, while the boys were given tunic suits for use on Sundays and jerseys with grey cricket shirts and shorts for everyday use.

In 1935, the buildings were renamed "Ashley Down Orphanage".

== The war years ==
By the end of 1938, No 2 House was standing empty and, in the spring of 1939, the City of Bristol asked to be allowed to use it on loan as a "centre of salvage work in time of need". Now all the children were cared for in three houses but, by the end of May, at the bidding of the Government, No 4 House was vacated, requisitioned by the Royal Navy and became the training establishment HMS Bristol. The girls were all housed in No 5 House, while the boys were relocated to No 3. Over 1,000 large windows had to be fitted for the war-time blackout.

By the autumn of 1940, the Government had requisitioned No 5 House as billets for American soldiers. Alternative accommodation had to be found and estate agents in Bristol stated that no suitable house was available anywhere in Bristol. Despite this, and after much prayer, 16 Cotham Park was rented for the accommodation of 80 of the youngest children. This move took place on 7 November 1940, the day before No 5 House was required to be vacated.

On 2 December, a German aircraft dropped its bombs over Ashley Down. One bomb exploded at the back of No 3 House, whilst another detonated at the front. Others destroyed private houses in the immediate area but the only damage caused to No 3 was the shattering of nearly 400 windows. No-one was hurt. The authorities in No 5 House sent some trainees over help clear away broken glass, blankets to cover the empty windows and labour to fix these in position.

A dogfight took place above the orphanage on the afternoon of 27 September 1940, the day of the remembrance of Müller's birthday at which many visitors came to Ashley Down to celebrate, however the attackers were driven off without any bombs being dropped and one German aircraft was shot down, crashing two miles away without any damage to property or life, although the crew were killed.

In 1941, Müller's name was formally adopted into the name of the orphanage - Müller's Orphan Homes, endorsing what had long been general usage.

By May 1944, it became possible to return the children in 16 Cotham Park to the accommodation in No 3 House. It is known that black American GIs were accommodated in one of the buildings (although it is unclear when they arrived) and that they were joined, on 10 July 1944, by white paratroopers, and that racial tensions ran high.

== Post war changes ==
In August 1945, No 5 House was handed back to the Trustees, but it took some time to make the building habitable for the orphan boys. However, the swimming pool was still usable. By the end of May 1946, the refurbishment of No 5 House had still not been complete. At this time, Hillbury, a large house on Martlet Road in Minehead, was purchased for use as a holiday home, and this was subsequently used to provide residential care for around ten children.

Müller's intention in building the orphanage at Ashley Down was because it was well-removed from the centre of Bristol. By this time, though, the surrounding area had been completely built upon, and so prayerful consideration was given to the purchase of land further away. As a result, in 1947–48, an estate of 400 acres (1.6 km^{2}) was acquired at Backwell Hill, and plans started to be drawn up for the conversion of the existing house and the building of new orphan houses there. It was further decided, on 13 May 1947, that as the number of "full" and "partial" orphans in the Homes were constantly diminishing, any needy child would, at the director's discretion, be admitted to the homes.

The estate at Backwell included two farms, where a herd of Guernsey-cross cattle were kept. Thus the orphanage was self-sufficient in milk.

By 1950, spiralling costs made the development of the Backwell estate unfeasible, and so it was decided to purchase houses capable of holding fifteen children, together with appropriate staff, in surrounding towns within a 20-mile (32 km) radius. One such house was purchased in Weston-super-Mare, for the care of boys up to the age of nine and girls up to school leaving age.

On 7 July 1951, 35 of the younger children moved from Ashley Down to Backwell Hill House, on the estate. In September of that year, responsibility for the orphans' education passed from the staff of the Müller Homes to the Bristol Education Committee. On 25 January 1952, "Glandore", in Weston-super-Mare received thirteen children. Other properties were acquired, "Green Lodge", "McCready House", "Auckland Lodge", "Grange House" and "Tilsley House" in Weston-super-Mare, "Strathmore" and "Bergin House" in Clevedon, and "Alveston Lodge", "Hillbury", and "Severnleigh" in Bristol overlooking the Downs. These latter two were intended to house older girls and boys who were in advanced education in the city.

When the 115th Annual Report was published, covering the year to 26 May 1954, it was noted that the charity's name had changed once more to "The Müller Homes for Children". Negotiations with Bristol Corporation to purchase all five houses, together with the swimming pool and playing fields, were advanced, and the Homes had only the full use of No 3 House and partial use of No 5.

More children left Ashley Down in 1954: 11 boys and four girls to Wright House on 16 September, 12 girls and 6 boys to Severnleigh on 19 October and 15 infants to The Grange on 2 November.

During 1955–56, 16 Cotham Park (which was rented by the Homes during the war) and 7 Cotham Park were purchased. Both buildings needed considerable work before the final vacation from Ashley Down could take place. No 16 became known as "Ashley Down House", while No 7 became "Müller House".

In July 1957, the orphanage disposed of the Backwell estate, the children having been dispersed through the Scattered Homes, as they were collectively known. The following spring, the final residents of No 3 House left Ashley Down for the last time, for 16 Cotham Park. The administration staff relocated to 7 Cotham Park on 10 June 1958. Thus 109 years of child care on the site was brought to an end. It is not known how many "full" orphans were admitted as a "large book" opened as an Admissions Register after the 37th child had been admitted on 3 October 1836, and referred to in the applications register, which held the names of the children admitted between 3 October 1836 and the move up to Ashley Down, has been lost but at least 11,603 full orphans, and 5,686 partial orphans had passed through the doors.

== The Post-Orphanage Era ==
Orphan Houses 4 and 5 are now owned by the City of Bristol College, while No 3 House (in which Müller lived for the last few years of his life and in which he died), on the other side of Ashley Down Road, was converted into private flats in 2007. No 1 House converted into flats in 2013, having lain derelict for a number of years. No 2 House was sold for redevelopment in early 2016.

Müller House (formerly known as No 3 House) was Grade II listed in 1998, as were many of the other houses.

== Notes ==
(Annual Reports are those published by the George Müller charity, now known as The George Müller Charitable Trust)

== Works cited ==
- Tayler, W Elfe (1870). The Bristol Orphan Houses, Ashley Down, 3rd Edition. 12 Paternoster Buildings, London: Morgan and Scott.
- Müller, George (1895). The Lord's Dealings with George Müller Vol 1, 9th Edition. Berners Street, London: J Nisbet & Co.
- Müller, George (2003). A narrative of some of the Lord's dealings with George Müller. Vol. 1. Spring Lake, Michigan: Dust & Ashes Publications. ISBN 0-9705439-6-4.
- Pierson, AT (1899). George Müller of Bristol. London: James Nisbet & Co.
- Steer, Roger (1997). George Müller: Delighted in God. Tain, Rosshire: Christian Focus. ISBN 1-84550-120-9.
- Garton, Nancy (1992). George Müller and his Orphans. Chivers Press, Bath. ISBN 0-7451-1675-2.
- Purves, Carol (2005). From Prussia with Love - the George Müller Story. Day One Publications. ISBN 184625008-0.
