= Emil Fischbacher =

British missionary (1903–1933)

Emil Fischbacher (Chinese: 巴富羲, 9 August 1903 – 27 May 1933) was a Scottish Protestant Christian missionary to Xinjiang. He served with the China Inland Mission.

Fischbacher was born in Glasgow, Scotland, 9 August 1903.

It was on the last Saturday in May 1931 that Emil Fischbacher picked up China's Millions and read the Appeal for the Two Hundred. It was on the last Saturday of May 1933, exactly two years later, that Dr. Fischbacher died in Ürümqi.

Fischbacher left London for China on 31 December 1931, he was on the last boatload of missionaries who came because of China Inland Mission's specific prayer for 200 new volunteers. His ship arrived in front of Shanghai when that city was under siege by the Japanese.

After language school in Anqing, he, along with five other young men, Raymond H. Joyce, William J. Drew, George Fox-Holmes, Aubrey Parsons, and Otto Schoerner was appointed to serve God in Xinjiang. George Hunter happened to be in Shanghai at that time (a very rare occurrence) starting on 13 September 1932. He accompanied the new recruits back to Xinjiang. Fischbacher, a gifted mechanic, drove the truck across Inner Mongolia to Urumqi. The journey took 57 days.

Fischbacher died on 27 May 1933 of typhus, which he contracted during the siege of Ürümqi, when caring for people wounded during the Muslim rebellion led by Ma Zhongying; he died three days after Percy C. Mather. He is buried in Ürümqi.

== Bibliography ==
- Broomhall, Marshall B.; To What Purpose? (London: CIM 1933)
- Schoerner, Otto F.; Serving Christ (Pine: Focalpoint 1997)

== See also ==
- Historical Bibliography of the China Inland Mission
- Percy C. Mather
