= Mildred Cable =

British missionary

- Born: Alice Mildred Cable; 21 February 1878; Guildford, Surrey England
- Died: 30 April 1952 (aged 74); Hampstead, London, England
- Occupation: Missionary in China

Alice Mildred Cable (Chinese: 蓋群英) (21 February 1878 – 30 April 1952) was a British Protestant Christian missionary in China, serving with the China Inland Mission. Cable was part of an inseparable "trio" of missionaries along with sisters Francesca and Eva French. The trio is best known for their missionary efforts along remote caravan routes in Central Asia and the Gobi Desert.

== Early life and career ==
Born in Guildford, the daughter of John Cable, a prosperous draper in Guildford, Cable early decided to become a missionary and studied pharmacy and human sciences at London University. She was engaged to a man who had also declared his intention to become a missionary, but he changed his mind and said he would not marry her unless she abandoned her ambition. She broke off the engagement, declined to take her final examination to graduate, and joined the China Inland Mission in 1901, meeting Evangeline (Eva) French who was returning to China following her first home leave. They worked together for the rest of their lives.

Cable and French were stationed in Huozhou, Shanxi, and often traveled in the surrounding area. Eva's younger sister, Francesca, joined them in 1910 (although some sources say 1908), and they became known as the "trio." After 20 years in Huozhou, they believed that the mission should be turned over to Chinese leaders and the three applied to work in relatively unknown, largely Muslim western China. Although there were doubts that women should be assigned to this region, their proposal was accepted in 1923.

The trio's base was Jiaquan, in the far western part of Gansu province

== Travels in Central Asia ==
For most of the next 12 years, in the words of Mildred Cable:

"From Etzingol to Turpan, from Jiuquan to Chuguchak, we ... spent long years in following trade-routes, tracing faint caravan tracks, searching out innumerable by-paths and exploring the most hidden oases. ... Five times we traversed the whole length of the desert, and in the process we had become part of its life."

A reviewer said of Cable and French's book, The Gobi Desert, that "this may be the best of many good books about Central Asia and the old Silk Road through the deserts of Western China."

In June 1923, all three set out for Central Asia from Huozhou. Traveling 1,500 miles (2,414 km) over the next eight months, evangelizing as they went, they reached Zhangye (then referred to as Kanchow). Zhangye was the last city inside of the Great Wall. A Chinese evangelist was working there and, at his request, they set up a Bible school over the winter. When summer came they were on the road again, following the Hexi Corridor westward, this time with some of the Chinese believers they had trained. They rented houses and a building for a church in Jiuquan that thereafter would be their base. From Jiuquan they traveled extensively, selling and giving away Bibles and Christian literature and extending their range to Tibetan villages in Qinghai province, Mongol encampments, and Muslim towns in Xinjiang province. They studied the Uighur language to communicate with Muslim women, the top priority of their missionary efforts, although it appears that they made very few converts among the Muslims.

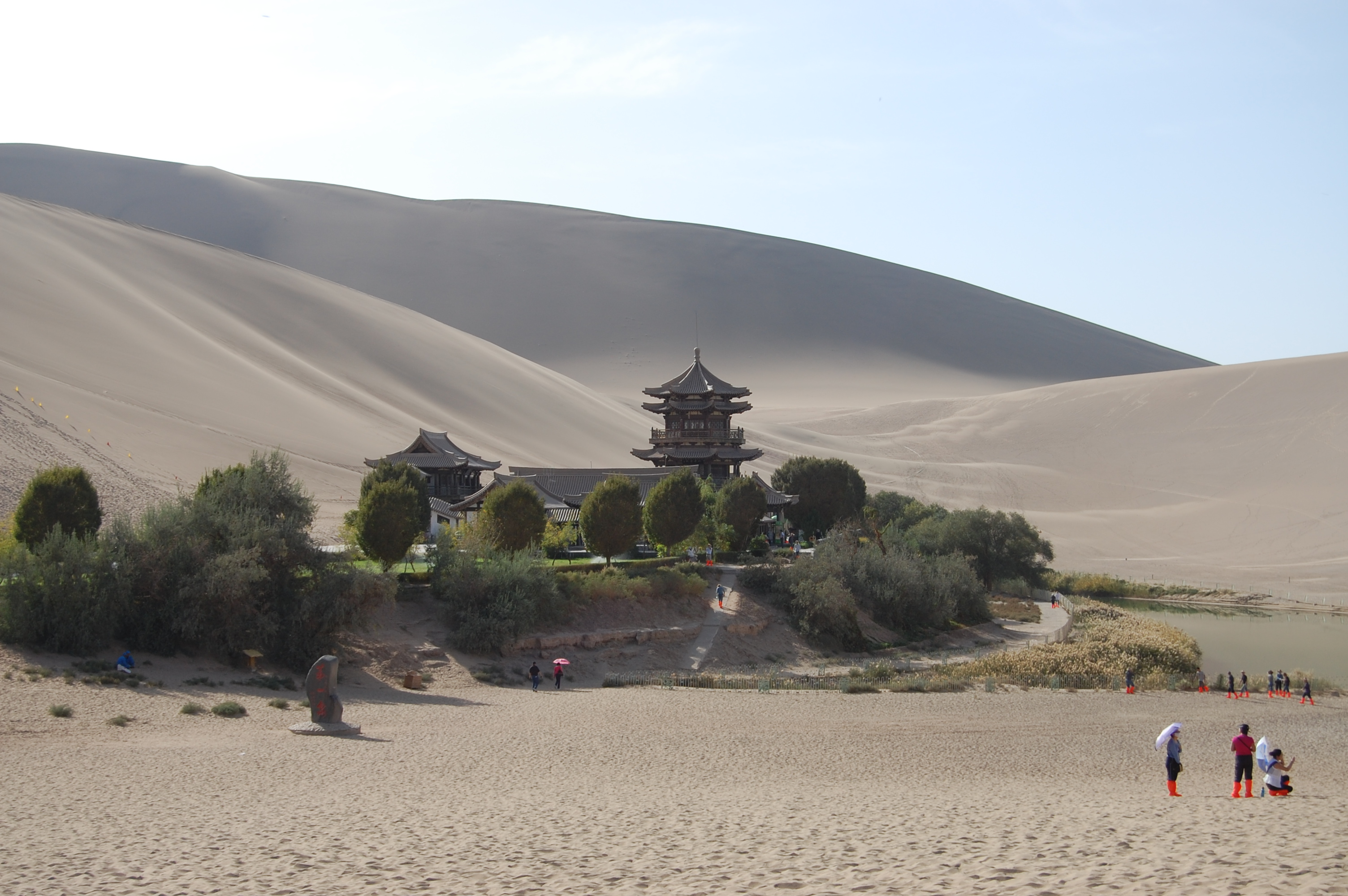
Crescent Lake was one of the oases visited by Cable and the French sisters.

The trio were independent, strong-willed, and bold women. Eva French was criticized for giving Communion to her Chinese congregation on Christmas Eve 1924, celebrating Communion being considered a male prerogative. Uncowed by the criticism, Mildred Cable celebrated Communion the following Easter. Their mode of travel in Central Asia differed from the contemporary expeditions of explorers such as Aurel Stein and Sven Hedin who often traveled in large caravans with armed guards. The three loaded their cart with religious literature and traversed the Silk Road alone or with a few Chinese colleagues.

The interpersonal relations among the "trio" were that "Mildred was the 'father figure,' Francesca the mother, and Eva the strong-willed, puckish and wonderful child." Mildred was called "Napoleon" by some of her co-workers.

To return to England on home leave in 1926, they traveled via Russian Siberia. After their return in 1928, they took a year-long journey into Xinjiang (then known as Chinese Turkestan), on the way being detained by a Dongan leader, Ma Zhongying, to tend his wounds. In 1932, they made their first journey into the Gobi, where Cable was badly injured by a kick from a donkey.

The trio left China for the last time in 1936 and were unable to return because, in August 1938, all foreigners were ordered to leave Gansu and Xinjiang by the local warlord. Cable and the French sisters retired to Dorset. During her retirement, Cable was much in demand as a speaker, making several international tours. She was awarded the Royal Society for Asian Affairs Lawrence of Arabia Memorial Medal in 1942.

She and French continued writing. Mildred Cable served as a vice president for the British and Foreign Bible Society until her death in London in 1952.

== Bibliography ==
=== Works ===
The majority of these titles were written in collaboration with Francesca French

- Mother India's Daughters: An Impression, London: Page & Thomas, (189-?)
- The Fulfilment of a Dream of Pastor Hsi's: The Story of the Work in Hwochow, Morgan & Scott (1917) (Pastor Hsi = Xi Shengmo, of Hwochow, Shansi)
- Powers of Darkness: being a record of some observations in demonology (1920)
- Dispatches from North-west Kansu (1925)
- Through Jade Gate and Central Asia (1927)
- The Red Lama (1927)
- The Needed Gesture to the Church in China, London: World Dominion Press, (1927)
- With the Bible in Central Asia, London : British and Foreign Bible Society, (1937)
- The Challenge of Central Asia: a brief survey of Tibet and its borderlands, Mongolia, north-west Kansu, Chinese Turkistan, and Russian Central Asia, London; New York: World Dominion Press (1929)
- Something Happened, Hodder and Stoughton (1933)
- A Desert Journal: Letters from Central Asia (1934) (with Evangeline and Francesca French)
- Cable, Mildred. 1934. “The Bazars of Tangut and the Trade-routes of Dzungaria”. The Geographical Journal 84 (1). [Wiley, Royal Geographical Society (with the Institute of British Geographers)]: 17–31. doi:10.2307/1786829.
- A Woman Who Laughed: "Henrietta Soltau who laughed at impossibilities and cried 'It shall be done'" London: The China Inland Mission (1934)
- Ambassadors for Christ (1935)
- Important to Motorists (1935)
- The Making of a Pioneer: Percy Mather of Central Asia (1935)
- "Come, follow": the call to service, London: Inter-Varsity Fellowship of Evangelical Unions, (1937)
- Towards Spiritual Maturity - A Book For Those Who Seek It (1939)
- Toward Spiritual Maturity: A Handbook for Those Who Seek It (1939)
- A Parable of Jade (1940)
- The Gobi Desert (1942)
- China: Her Life and Her People (1946)
- The Book which Demands a Verdict (1946)
- The Story of Topsy; Little Lonely of Central Asia (1947)
- The Bible in Mission Lands, Fleming H. Revell Co. (1947)
- The Bible in the World, London: Bible Reading Fellowship (1947)
- George Hunter Apostle of Turkestan (1948)
- Grace, Child of the Gobi (1949)
- Journey with a Purpose, Hodder & Stoughton (1950)
- What it Means to be a Christian (1950)
- Wall of Spears: The Gobi Desert (1951)
- Why Not the World? The story of the work of God through the Bible Society, London: The British and Foreign Bible Society (1952)

== See also ==
- List of China Inland Mission missionaries in China

== Footnotes ==
=== Biographies ===
- W. J. Platt, Three Women; Mildred Cable, Francesca French, Evangeline French: the authorized biography (1964).
- Cecil Northcott, Star Over Gobi: the story of Mildred Cable. London: Lutterworth Press, 1957.
- Janet & Geoff Benge, Through the Jade Gate: Mildred Cable.
