= Topsy (d.1998) =

Topsy (c. 1914—died 26 January 1998) was an abused deaf mute Chinese Tartary girl who was adopted by British missionary Mildred Cable, a Protestant Christian missionary in China, serving with the China Inland Mission, and her friends Evangeline (Eva) French and Francesca French. Her story was told by Cable and Francesca French in the book The Story of Topsy.

Her mother was Tibetan and her father Mongolian. She was fostered, but when her foster mother discovered she was unable to hear, she was sent to beg. At the time Cable and her friends discovered her in Gansu, she was around 6 or 7 years old. She was beaten by her foster mother and bitten by neighborhood dogs, as she was unable to hear them approaching. The French sisters bought her and began caring for her.

The friends renamed her Ai Lien (Love Bond), though they called her Topsy, and brought her with them as they continued their travels and returned to England. To take her through Russia, they had to obtain a British passport for her, and her name was anglicized to Eileen and her surname was changed to Guy, as Cable's Chinese name was Kai or Gai.

In England, she was given an oral education. According to archived library index cards at the UCL Ear Institute, she was the first deaf person to appear on British television, being shown at Alexandra Palace before World War II.

The French sisters left her their money when they died in 1960 (Guy was thought to be about 45 at that time), at which time she lived at Troutstream Hall in Rickmansworth, where she enjoyed needlework and cooking. She died 26 January 1998 in Penge.
