= Topsy, Missouri =

Unincorporated community in Missouri, U.S.

Coordinates: 40°21′11″N 93°28′48″W

Topsy is an unincorporated community in Mercer County, in the U.S. state of Missouri.

== History ==
Topsy had its start in 1885. A post office called Topsy was established in 1885, and remained in operation until 1906.
