= Topsy-Turvy (disambiguation) =

Topsy-turvy means "upside down". It may also refer to:

== People ==
- Topsy-Turvey (or Topsey Turvey), and Carrie Carlton, pseudonyms of Elizabeth Chamberlain Wright

== Arts and entertainment ==
=== Fictional characters ===
- Mr. Topsy-Turvy, a Mr. Men character

=== Film ===
- Topsy Turvy, a 1927 Krazy Kat film
- Topsy-Turvy, a 1999 musical-drama film

=== Literature ===
- The Purchase of the North Pole (Topsy-Turvy), an 1889 novel by Jules Verne

=== Music ===
- Topsy-Turvy (album), a 2002 album by The Apex Theory
- Topsy Turvy (Guitar Shorty album), a 1993 album by Guitar Shorty
- "Topsy Turvy", a song from the 1996 film The Hunchback of Notre Dame
  - Topsy Turvy, a video in the Disney Sing-Along Songs series
- Topsy Turvy (Young Fresh Fellows album), a 1985 album by Young Fresh Fellows

=== Other media ===
- Netherlandish Proverbs (The Topsy Turvy World), a 1559 painting by Pieter Bruegel the Elder
- Topsyturveydom, an 1874 W. S. Gilbert comic opera
- "Topsy Turvey", an episode in the first season of The Batman
- Yoshi's Universal Gravitation (in North America as Yoshi Topsy-Turvy), a 2004 video game

== Other uses ==
- Topsy-Turvy doll, a double-ended doll featuring two opposing characters
