= Evangeline French =

British missionary

Evangeline Frances "Eva" French (Chinese: 馮貴珠; pinyin: Féng Guìzhū) (1869-8 July 1960) was a British Protestant Christian missionary in China. She served with the China Inland Mission (CIM). French was part of the inseparable "trio" of missionaries along with Mildred Cable and her sister Francesca French. The trio is best known for their missionary efforts along remote caravan routes in Central Asia and in the Gobi Desert.

== Early life and career ==
Evangeline was born in Algeria, the eldest daughter of an English couple, John Erington French and his first cousin Frances Elizabeth French. Eva was educated at a secondary school in Geneva, Switzerland. When the family later returned to England, Eva apparently disliked the rigid and provincial Victorian society. She described herself as "the fervid nihilist, the incipient communist, the embryonic Bolshevist." It surprised her family when she became a Christian and applied to become a missionary for the CIM. The missionary society initially found her too unconventional in education and overly fashionable in dress, but finally accepted her. She was assigned to the Shanxi mission.

After seven years at her station the Boxer Rebellion in summer 1900 forced her to flee China. She returned to China in 1902. At her mission station of Huozhou 霍州, Shanxi, she formed a lifelong partnership with Alice Mildred Cable who had recently arrived. She was joined by her younger sister Francesca Law French in 1908, after their mother had died.

Cable and the French sisters traveled constantly in the surrounding area. They became known as the "trio." After 20 years in Huozhou, they believed that the mission should be turned over to Chinese leaders and the three applied to work in relatively unknown, largely Muslim western China. Although there were doubts that women should be assigned to this region their proposal was finally accepted in 1923.

The trio's base was Jiaquan, in the far western part of Gansu province highlighted on this map

== Travels in Central Asia ==
For the next thirteen years, in the words of Mildred Cable: "From Etzingol to Turpan, from Spring of Wine to Chuguchak, we ... spent long years in following trade-routes, tracing faint caravan tracks, searching out innumerable by-paths and exploring the most hidden oases. ... Five times we traversed the whole length of the desert, and in the process we had become part of its life"

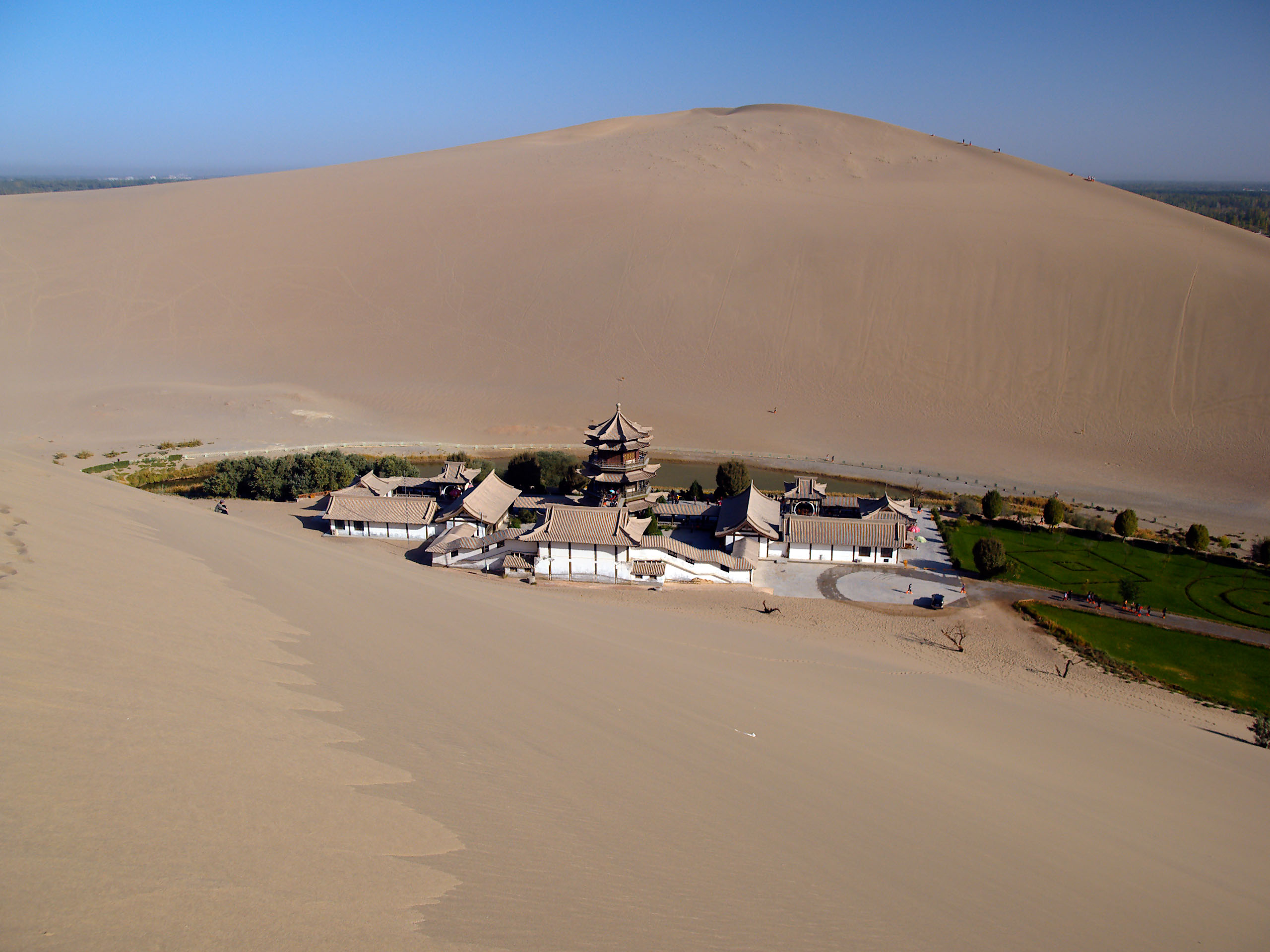
Crescent Lake was one of the oases visited by the trio.

In June 1923, all three set out for Central Asia from Huozhou. Travelling 1,500 miles (2,414 km) over the next eight months, evangelizing as they went, they reached Zhangye (then referred to as Kanchow). Zhangye was the last city inside of the Great Wall. A Chinese evangelist was already working there, and at his request they set up a Bible school over the winter. When summer came they were on the road again, following the Hexi Corridor westward, this time with some of the Chinese believers they had trained. They rented houses for themselves and a building for a church in Jiuquan which thereafter would be their base. From Jiuquan they travelled extensively, selling and giving away Bibles and Christian literature and extending their range to Tibetan villages in Qinghai province, Mongol encampments, and Muslim towns in Xinjiang province. They studied the Uighur language to communicate with Muslim women, the top priority of their missionary efforts, although it appears that they made very few converts among the Muslims.

The trio were independent, strong-willed, and bold women. Eva French was criticized for giving Communion to her Chinese congregation on Christmas Eve 1924, celebrating Communion being considered a male prerogative. Uncowed by the criticism, Mildred Cable celebrated Communion the following Easter. Their mode of travel in Central Asia differed from the contemporary expeditions of explorers such as Aurel Stein and Sven Hedin, who traveled in large caravans with armed guards. The trio loaded their cart up with religious literature and traversed the Silk Road alone or with a few Chinese colleagues.

The interpersonal relations among the "trio" were that "Mildred was the 'father figure,' Francesca the mother, and Eva the strong-willed, puckish and wonderful child."

To return to England on home leave, they travelled via Soviet Siberia. After their return, they took a year-long journey into Xinjiang (then known as Chinese Turkestan), on the way being detained by a Dongan leader, Ma Zhongying, to tend his wounds. In 1932, they made their first journey into the Gobi, where Cable was badly injured by a kick from a donkey. The trio left China for the last time in 1936 and were unable to return because, in August 1938, all foreigners were ordered to leave Gansu and Xinjiang by the local warlords. The trio retired to Dorset. Eva took primary responsibility for caring for a deaf and dumb Chinese orphan, called "Topsy", the trio had adopted. She was much less a public figure than Cable and sister Francesca, well-known authors and speakers. However, Eva seems to have been the most forthright in evangelical and women's work. Evangeline died at Shaftesbury, Dorset, England, 8 July 1960.

== Bibliography ==
- Dispatches from North-West Kansu (1925) (by Mildred Cable and Francesca French)
- Through Jade Gate and Central Asia (1927) (by Mildred Cable and Francesca French)
- Something Happened (1933) (by Mildred Cable and Francesca French)
- A Desert Journal: Letter from Central Asia (1934) (by Evangeline French, Mildred Cable, and Francesca French)
- Ambassadors for Christ (1935)
- Toward Spiritual Maturity: A Handbook for Those Who Seek It (1939)
- A Parable of Jade (1940)
- The Gobi Desert (1942) (by Mildred Cable and Francesca French)
- The Book which Demands a Verdict (1946)
- George Hunter, Apostle of Turkestan (1948)
- W. J. Platt, Three Women: Mildred Cable, Francesca French, Evangeline French: The Authorized Biography (1964).
