= Robert Chapman (pastor) =

Robert Cleaver Chapman
- Portrait d. (Unknown date)
- Born: 4 January 1803; Helsingor, Denmark
- Died: 12 June 1902 (aged 99); Barnstaple, England
- Occupations: Pastor, Teacher and Evangelist

Robert Cleaver Chapman (4 January 1803 – 12 June 1902), known as the "apostle of Love", was a pastor, teacher and evangelist.

== Early days ==
Chapman was born in Helsingor, Denmark, in a wealthy Anglican merchant family from Whitby, Yorkshire. Robert was educated by his mother whilst the family was in Denmark and later at a boarding school in Yorkshire, after the return of the family to England.

At the age of 15 Robert moved to London to work as an apprentice clerk in the legal profession.

== Legal career ==
Robert completed his 5-year apprenticeship and became an attorney in 1823. In the same year he became a Christian after listening to the gospel preached by James Harington Evans in a nonconformist chapel in London. He prospered in his career and also spiritually and spent most of his spare time visiting and helping the poor of London.

His dedication to the poor made a great impression on his cousin's husband, a Mr. Pugsley, from Barnstaple, Devon, so much so that Pugsley, another lawyer, also became a Christian and began working with the poor in Barnstaple.

In 1831 Robert visited Barnstaple on a holiday and helped out in preaching and other Christian work in the vicinity. On returning to London he became convinced that he was being called into full-time Christian work; he also increasingly felt that some aspects of his legal work sat uncomfortably with his faith.

In 1832 he was invited by the Ebenezer Strict Baptist Chapel in Barnstaple to be their pastor. In April 1832 he left the legal profession and moved to Barnstaple to become a pastor.

== Pastoral career ==
He accepted the post as pastor of a Strict Baptist chapel only on the condition that he would only be bound by what was written in the Bible and not by any denominational creeds or beliefs. Fellowship, for example, he believed was open to all true believers in Christ, and not restricted to those who had been baptised by full immersion on a profession of faith. His views on fellowship were similar to those of Anthony Norris Groves.

Over time, the chapel changed from being Strict Baptist to a non denominational one ran on similar grounds to the assembly led by George Müller in Bristol, with a building at Grosvenor Street eventually being known as Grosvenor Street Chapel. In 1994 this church moved from Grosvenor Street to another part of Barnstaple occupying a converted railway shed and is now known as Grosvenor Church.

Other examples of the assembly moving to a non denominational position are one man ministry being replaced by the priesthood of all believers and Chapman refusing any clerical salary. Chapman never enforced these changes onto the chapel and never forced his viewpoint but was prepared to wait for every believer meeting at the chapel to see the need for change.

Chapman rose to become an influential figure within the Plymouth Brethren alongside John Nelson Darby and George Müller. His zeal and compassion for people led to him being referred to by many as the "apostle of love". For example, Chapman preferred to live very frugally in a deprived area of Barnstaple in order to reach the poor.

In 1848 he sided with George Müller in regards to a dispute over the independency of each assembly and believed that John Nelson Darby should have waited much longer before excommunicating Müller's assembly in Bristol for not supporting Darby in his dispute with Benjamin Wills Newton. This riled some supporters of Darby who were wanting to discredit Chapman. Darby, however reproved them, saying, "You leave that man alone; We talk of the heavenlies, but Robert Chapman lives in them."

In regards to the timing of the rapture of the Church, an issue which became prominent within the brethren movement, Chapman held a partial rapture view with part of the saved being raptured before the Great Tribulation and a part of them after the Great Tribulation.

Charles Spurgeon called Chapman "the saintliest man I ever knew". Chapman became so well known that a letter from abroad addressed only to "R.C. Chapman, University of Love, England" was correctly delivered to him.

== Selected sayings ==
- “God is love” (1 John 4:16). His children please Him only so far as they are like Him, and “walk in love” (Eph. 5:2).
- Humility is the secret of fellowship, and pride the secret of division.
- If we would wisely reprove the flesh in our brethren, we must first, after the Lord's example, remember and commend the grace in them.
