= Huozhou =

Huozhou 霍州市
- County-level city
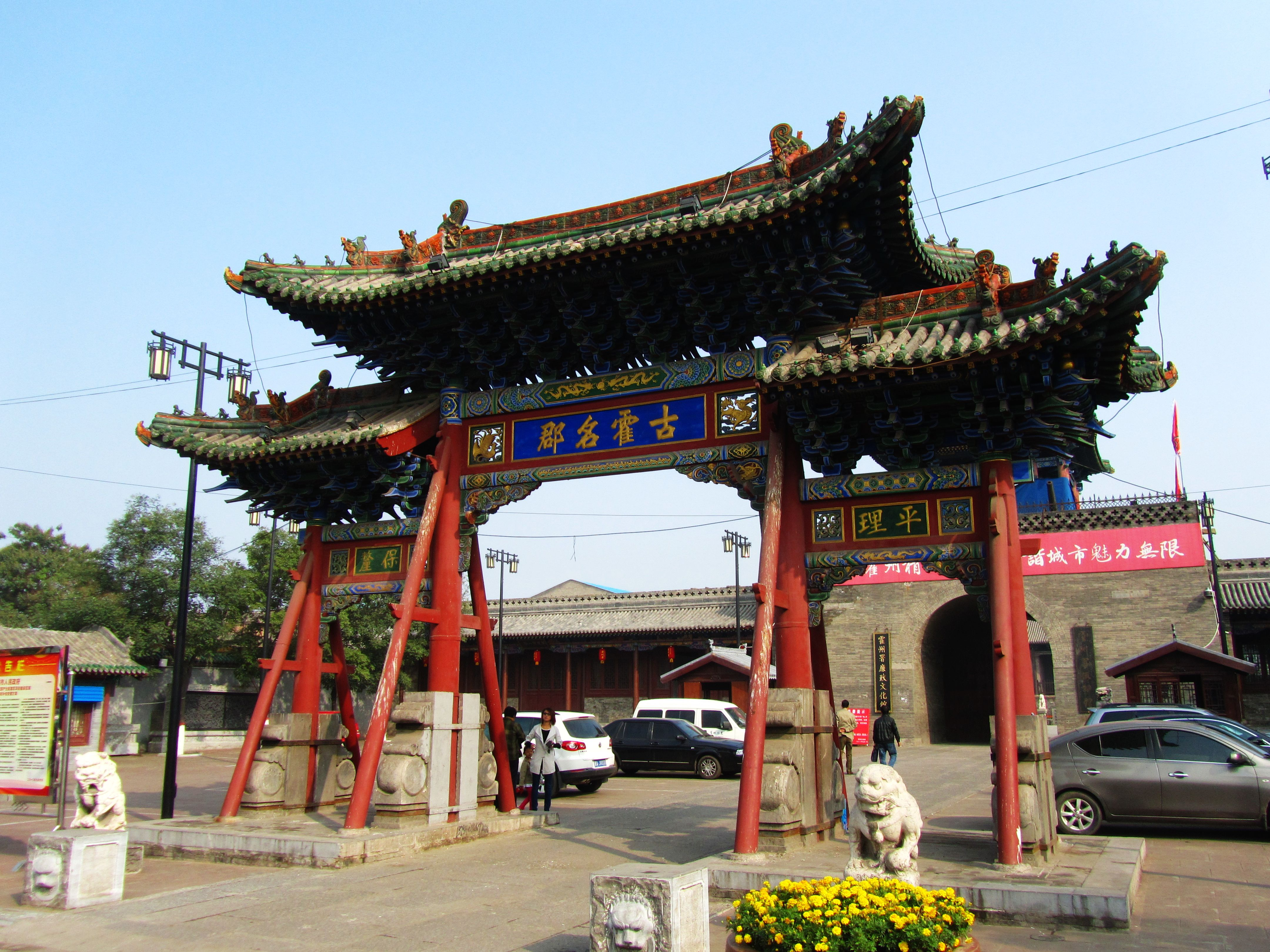
- Huozhou Prefectural Hall

- Location in Shanxi
- Coordinates (Huozhou municipal government): 36°34′08″N 111°45′18″E
- Country: People's Republic of China
- Province: Shanxi
- Prefecture-level city: Linfen

Area
  - County-level city: 765.0 km^{2} (295.4 sq mi)
  - Urban: 19.50 km^{2} (7.53 sq mi)

Population (2017)
  - County-level city: 347,000
  - Density: 454/km^{2} (1,170/sq mi)
  - Urban: 155,000
- Time zone: UTC+8 (China Standard)
- Postal code: 031400
- Area code: 0357

Huozhou (Chinese: 霍州; pinyin: Huòzhōu), formerly Huo County or Huoxian, is a county-level city in Linfen, in southern Shanxi Province, China. The city spans an area or 765 square kilometers, and has a population of 155,000 as of 2017.

== Administrative divisions ==
Huozhou has jurisdiction over five subdistricts, four towns and three townships.

The city's subdistricts are Nanhuan Road Subdistrict (南环路街道), Gulou Subdistrict (鼓楼街道), Beihuan Road Subdistrict (北环路街道), Kaiyuan Subdistrict (开元街道), and Tuisha Subdistrict (退沙街道).

The city's towns are Xinzhi (辛置镇), Dazhang (大张镇), Bailong (白龙镇), and Licao (李曹镇).

The city's townships are Sanjiao Township (三教乡), Shizhuang Township (师庄乡), and Taotangyu Township (陶唐峪乡).

The city's administrative offices are located in Kaiyuan Subdistrict.

== Geography ==
The city's altitude ranges from 516 to 2,504.3 m (1,693 to 8,216 ft) in height. The Fen River runs through the city from north to south.

=== Climate ===
Huozhou has an annual average temperature of 12.2 °C (54.0 °F), an annual precipitation averaging 437.3 mm (17.22 in), and an average of 2265.1 annual sunshine hours.

Climate data for Huozhou, elevation 550 m (1,800 ft), (1991–2020 normals, extremes 1981–present)
Month	Jan	Feb	Mar	Apr	May	Jun	Jul	Aug	Sep	Oct	Nov	Dec	Year
Record high °C (°F)	16.6 (61.9)	21.9 (71.4)	29.0 (84.2)	35.0 (95.0)	37.6 (99.7)	42.0 (107.6)	40.3 (104.5)	40.0 (104.0)	37.6 (99.7)	31.8 (89.2)	24.2 (75.6)	15.4 (59.7)	42.0 (107.6)
Mean daily maximum °C (°F)	4.4 (39.9)	8.8 (47.8)	15.4 (59.7)	22.4 (72.3)	27.6 (81.7)	31.7 (89.1)	32.4 (90.3)	30.6 (87.1)	25.8 (78.4)	19.6 (67.3)	12.0 (53.6)	5.5 (41.9)	19.7 (67.4)
Daily mean °C (°F)	−2.8 (27.0)	1.3 (34.3)	7.8 (46.0)	14.7 (58.5)	20.2 (68.4)	24.5 (76.1)	26.1 (79.0)	24.3 (75.7)	19.1 (66.4)	12.4 (54.3)	4.9 (40.8)	−1.5 (29.3)	12.6 (54.6)
Mean daily minimum °C (°F)	−7.8 (18.0)	−3.9 (25.0)	1.8 (35.2)	8.0 (46.4)	13.2 (55.8)	18.1 (64.6)	21.0 (69.8)	19.7 (67.5)	14.3 (57.7)	7.4 (45.3)	0.2 (32.4)	−6.1 (21.0)	7.2 (44.9)
Record low °C (°F)	−20.0 (−4.0)	−18.8 (−1.8)	−11.2 (11.8)	−4.4 (24.1)	2.8 (37.0)	9.3 (48.7)	14.4 (57.9)	10.5 (50.9)	3.0 (37.4)	−4.5 (23.9)	−13.6 (7.5)	−19.0 (−2.2)	−20.0 (−4.0)
Average precipitation mm (inches)	4.1 (0.16)	6.2 (0.24)	10.8 (0.43)	26.5 (1.04)	30.0 (1.18)	53.6 (2.11)	102.9 (4.05)	101.5 (4.00)	60.5 (2.38)	34.3 (1.35)	14.2 (0.56)	3.2 (0.13)	447.8 (17.63)
Average precipitation days (≥ 0.1 mm)	2.4	2.8	3.9	5.6	6.5	8.2	11.3	10.1	8.7	6.7	4.1	2.0	72.3
Average snowy days	3.2	3.1	1.3	0.2	0	0	0	0	0	0	1.3	2.6	11.7
Average relative humidity (%)	52	50	47	47	50	54	66	70	71	68	62	55	58
Mean monthly sunshine hours	129.4	145.1	190.7	221.1	244.2	227.7	209.6	192.9	168.6	166.8	141.8	125.1	2,163
Percentage possible sunshine	42	47	51	56	56	52	47	46	46	48	47	42	48
Source: China Meteorological Administration all-time August record high

== History ==
Present-day Huozhou was once part of the Ji Province of ancient China, when it was simply named Huo (霍; Huò). During the Spring and Autumn period of Chinese history, the city was conquered by Duke Xian of Jin in 661 BCE, and was subsequently renamed Huoyi (霍邑; Huòyì). During the Yuan dynasty, the area received its current name, Huozhou (霍州; Huòzhōu).

During the Ming dynasty, the city was made a fief for second rank princely peerages.

== Economy ==
Major agricultural products produced in Huozhou include wheat, corn, millet, soybeans, potatoes, apples, walnuts, cotton, sunflower oil, rapeseed, and various vegetables.

Huozhou's mineral deposits include iron, copper, aluminum, gold, limestone, dolomite, gypsum, refractory clay, phosphorus, sillimanite, kaolinite, pegmatite, quartz sand, barite, graphite, granite, Yixing clay, taotu, pyrite, other types of clay, sand and gravel, rare earth minerals, energy mineral coal, mineral water. As of 2011, the city's coal reserves total 1.735 billion tons, and quartz sand reserves totalled 170 million tons.

== Transport ==
The southern portion of the Datong–Puzhou railway and the G5 Beijing-Kunming Expressway both run through the city.
