= Francesca French =

British missionary (1871–1960)

Francesca Law French (Chinese: 馮貴石; pinyin: Féng Guìshí; 12 December 1871 – 2 August 1960) was a British Protestant Christian missionary in China. She served with the China Inland Mission. French was part of the inseparable "trio" of missionaries along with Mildred Cable and her sister Eva French. The trio is best known for their missionary efforts along remote caravan routes in Central Asia and the Gobi Desert.

== Early career ==
French was born in Bruges, Belgium, the second daughter of English parents John Erington French and his first cousin Frances Elizabeth French. She was educated at the secondary school in Geneva, Switzerland. Her older sister, Evangeline F. French had gone to China as a missionary in 1893. Francesca wanted to go to China also, but she remained in England to care for her aging mother. After her mother died, in 1908 she joined her sister in China.

The French sisters were stationed with Mildred Cable in Huozhou, Shanxi and travelled constantly in the surrounding area. They became known as the "trio." Francesca was the quietest of the three and described as sensitive, sympathetic, bookish, and artistic. After 20 years in Huozhou, the trio believed that the mission should be turned over to Chinese leaders and the three applied to work in relatively unknown, largely Muslim western China. Although there were doubts that women should be assigned to this region their proposal was finally accepted in 1923.

The trio's base was Jiuquan, in the far western part of Gansu province.

== Travels in Central Asia ==
In 1913, the trio travelled to Gansu Province, Xinjiang and the Gobi Desert, and a few years later they adopted a young Tartar girl named Topsy, a deaf mute, who remained with them when they returned to Britain.

For most of the next thirteen years, in the words of Mildred Cable: "From Etzingol to Turpan, from Spring of Wine to Chuguchak, we ... spent long years in following trade-routes, tracing faint caravan tracks, searching out innumerable by-paths and exploring the most hidden oases. ... Five times we traversed the whole length of the desert, and in the process we had become part of its life" A reviewer said of Cable and Francesca French's book, The Gobi Desert, that "this may be the best of many good books about Central Asia and the old Silk Road through the deserts of Western China."

In June 1923, all three set out for Central Asia from Huozhou. Travelling 1,500 miles (2,414 km) over the next eight months, evangelizing as they went, they reached Zhangye (then referred to as Kanchow). Zhangye was the last city inside of the Great Wall. A Chinese evangelist was already working there, and at his request they set up a Bible school over the winter. When summer came they were on the road again, following the Hexi Corridor westward, this time with some of the Chinese believers they had trained. They rented houses for themselves and a building for a church in Jiuquan which thereafter would be their base. From Jiuquan they travelled extensively, selling and giving away bibles and Christian literature and extending their range to Tibetan villages in Qinghai province, Mongol encampments, and Muslim towns in Xinjiang province. They studied the Uighur language to communicate with Muslim women, the top priority of their missionary efforts, although it appears that they made very few converts among the Muslims.

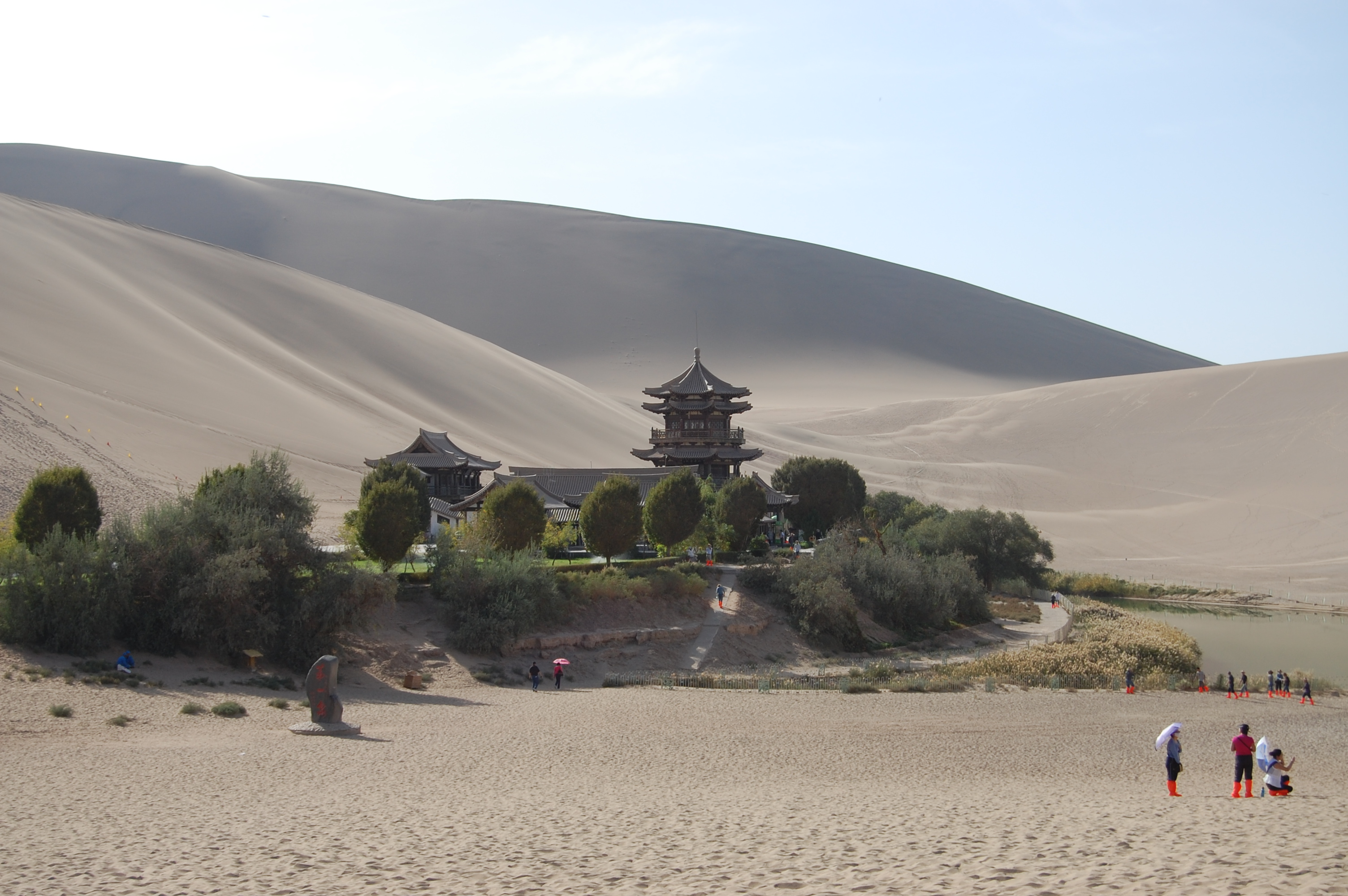
Crescent Lake (Dunhuang) was one of the oases visited by Cable and the French sisters.

The trio were independent, strong-willed, and bold women. Eva French was criticized for giving Communion to her Chinese congregation on Christmas Eve 1924, celebrating Communion being considered a male prerogative. Uncowed by the criticism, Mildred Cable celebrated Communion the following Easter. Their mode of travel in Central Asia differed from the contemporary expeditions of explorers such as Aurel Stein and Sven Hedin who often traveled in large caravans with armed guards. The trio loaded their cart up with religious literature and traversed the Silk Road alone or with a few Chinese colleagues.

The interpersonal relations among the "trio" were that "Mildred was the 'father figure,' Francesca the mother, and Eva the strong-willed, puckish and wonderful child."

To return to England on home leave in 1926, they travelled via Soviet Siberia. After their return in 1928, they took a year-long journey into Xinjiang (then known as Chinese Turkestan), on the way being detained by a Dongan leader, Ma Zhongying, to tend his wounds. In 1932, they made their first journey into the Gobi, where Cable was badly injured by a kick from a donkey.

The trio left China for the last time in 1936 and were unable to return because, in August 1938, all foreigners were ordered to leave Gansu and Xinjiang by the local warlords. Cable and the French sisters retired to Dorset. During her retirement, Francesca was much in demand as a speaker, making several international tours. She and Mildred Cable continued writing.

Cable died in 1952. Francesca died on 2 August 1960 aged 88 in Watford (which was then in Hertfordshire), less than a month after the death of her sister Eva, who died in Sturminster, Dorset aged 91.

== Bibliography ==
- Mildred Cable and Francesca French, Dispatches from North-West Kansu (1925)
- Through Jade Gate and Central Asia (1927)
- Something Happened (1933)
- A Desert journal: Letter from Central Asia (1934)
- Ambassadors for Christ (1935)
- Toward Spiritual Maturity: A Handbook for Those Who Seek It (1939)
- A Parable of Jade (1940)
- The Gobi Desert (1942)
- The Book which Demands a Verdict (1946)
- China - Her Life and Her People (1946)
- George Hunter Apostle of Turkestan (1948)
- W. J. Platt, Three Women: Mildred Cable, Francesca French, Evangeline French: The Authorized Biography (1964).
