= Sï-Shen-Tsï Methodist Church =

- Gospel Church; Gracious Light Church; Enguang Protestant Church
- 四聖祠禮拜堂
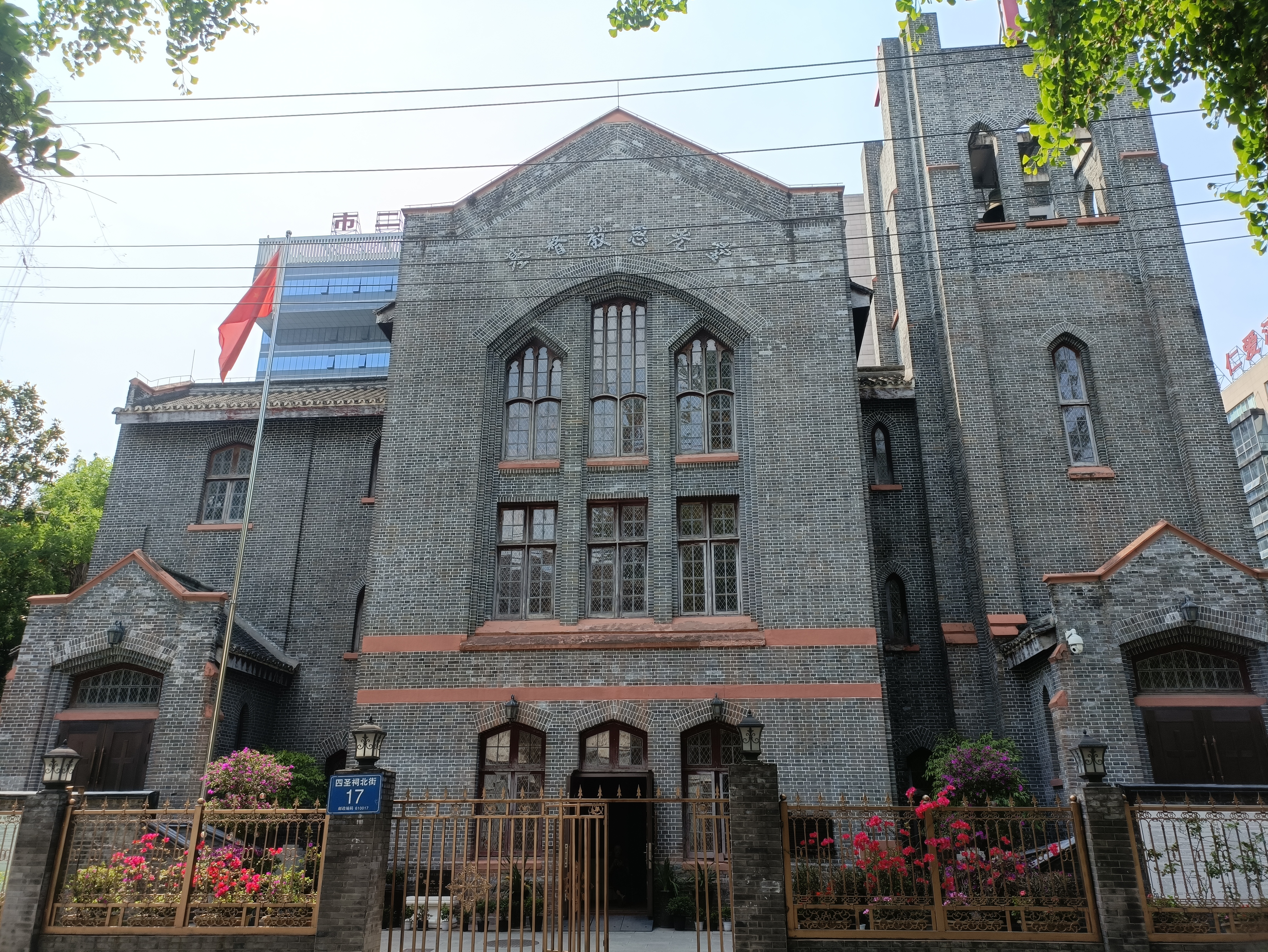
- Sï-Shen-Tsï Methodist Church
- Location: 17 Sishengci North Street, Jinjiang District, Chengdu, Sichuan
- Country: China
- Denomination: Three-Self Church (Protestant)
- Previous denomination: Methodist

History
- Status: Church
- Founded: 1894
- Founder: Virgil Chittenden Hart

Architecture
- Functional status: Active
- Architect: Walter Small
- Style: Gothic Revival
- Groundbreaking: 1894

Sï-Shen-Tsï Methodist Church (Note: Traditional Chinese: 四聖祠禮拜堂; simplified Chinese: 四圣祠礼拜堂; pinyin: Sìshèngcí Lǐbàitáng; Wade–Giles: Ssu^{4}-Shêng^{4}-Tzʻu^{2} Li^{3}-pai^{4}-tʻang^{2}; Sichuanese romanization: Sï^{4} Shen^{4} Tsʽï^{2} Li^{3} Pai^{4} Tʽang^{2}; lit. 'Sï-Shen-Tsï Chapel'; also spelled Sz Shen Tsz; also known as The First [Methodist] Church of [Chengtu], Gospel Church (Chinese: 福音堂; pinyin: Fúyīn Táng; Wade–Giles: Fu^{2}-yin^{1} Tʻang^{2}; Sichuanese romanization: Fu^{5} In^{1} Tʽang^{2}) or Enguang Protestant Church (Chinese: 恩光堂; pinyin: Ēnguāng Táng; Sichuanese romanization: Ngen^{1} Kuang^{1} Tʽang^{2}; lit. 'Gracious Light Church').), also called Enguang Church, is a Protestant church situated on Sishengci North Street in the city of Chengdu, Sichuan Province (formerly romanized as Sz-Chuan or Szechwan, also referred to as "West China"). It is the first church in Chengdu built by the Canadian Methodist Mission. It has been subjected to the control of the state-sanctioned Three-Self Patriotic Church since 1954.

== History ==
Sï-Shen-Tsï Church was erected in 1894 by the Rev. Virgil Chittenden Hart, leader of the West China Mission of the Missionary Society of the Methodist Church in Canada (MCC), which at the time was practically a chapel.

The church was designed by Walter Small, a Victoria University graduate known as the "Mission's Builder". Its walls were made of solid brick. It was built in semi-native style with fine board floors, and seated three hundred persons.

A year later, it was destroyed by the anti-religious turmoil (Chengdu Mission Case) in 1895. It was rebuilt the following year. In 1900, when the Boxer Rebellion broke out, the church was destroyed again and rebuilt again.

It was doubled in size in 1911. The building cost $1,000 in gold, a sum gifted by Jairus Hart, Esq., of Halifax, N.S.

At that time, the situation was not considered particularly good. The Jinjiang District, in where the church was erected, was comparatively poor, and had not the best reputation. But this had changed much by 1920. This change was due in part to the general growth of the city, in part to the opening of a new city gate in the near vicinity. According to Rev. Newton Ernest Bowles, Canadian missionaries believed this was in no small measure due to the general influence of the church itself.

The present church building covers an area of more than 3,000 square meters, with a usable area of more than 1,200 square meters. The height of the church is about 18 meters. The Sichuan Theological Seminary is located next to the church.

== Gallery ==
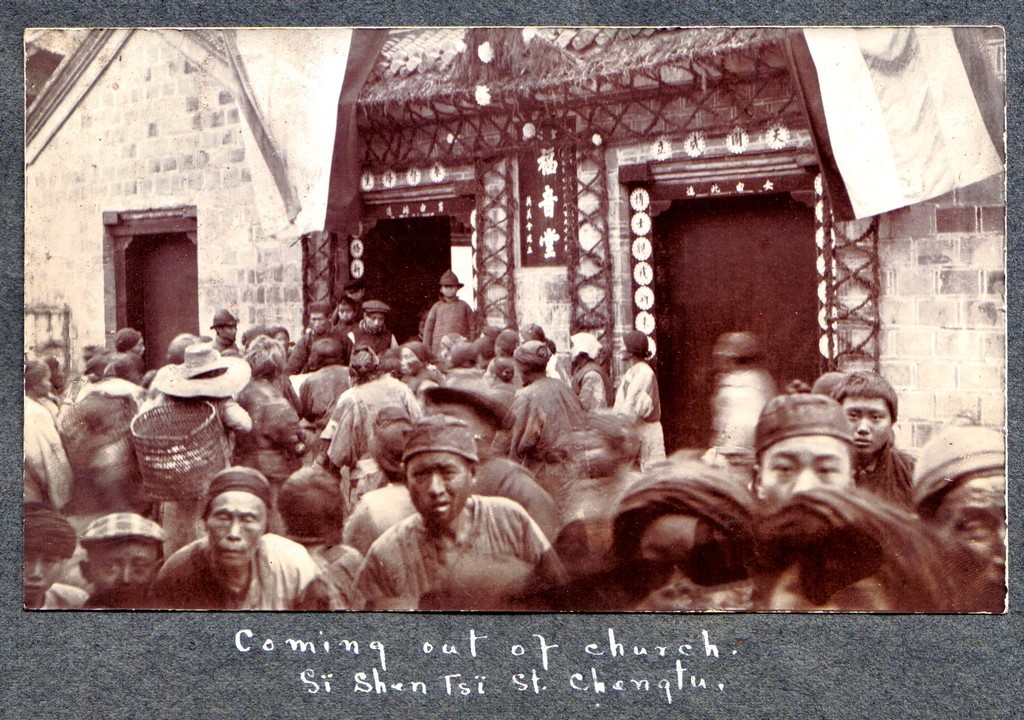
Sï-Shen-Tsï Methodist Church before 1928

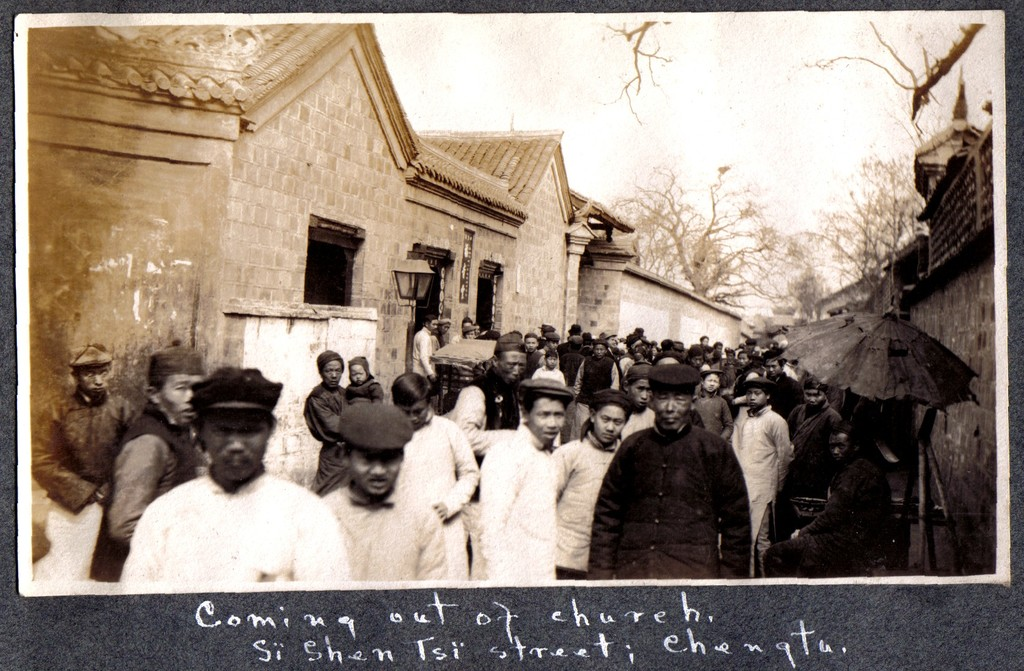
Sï-Shen-Tsï Church when in the Republican Era (1912–1949)

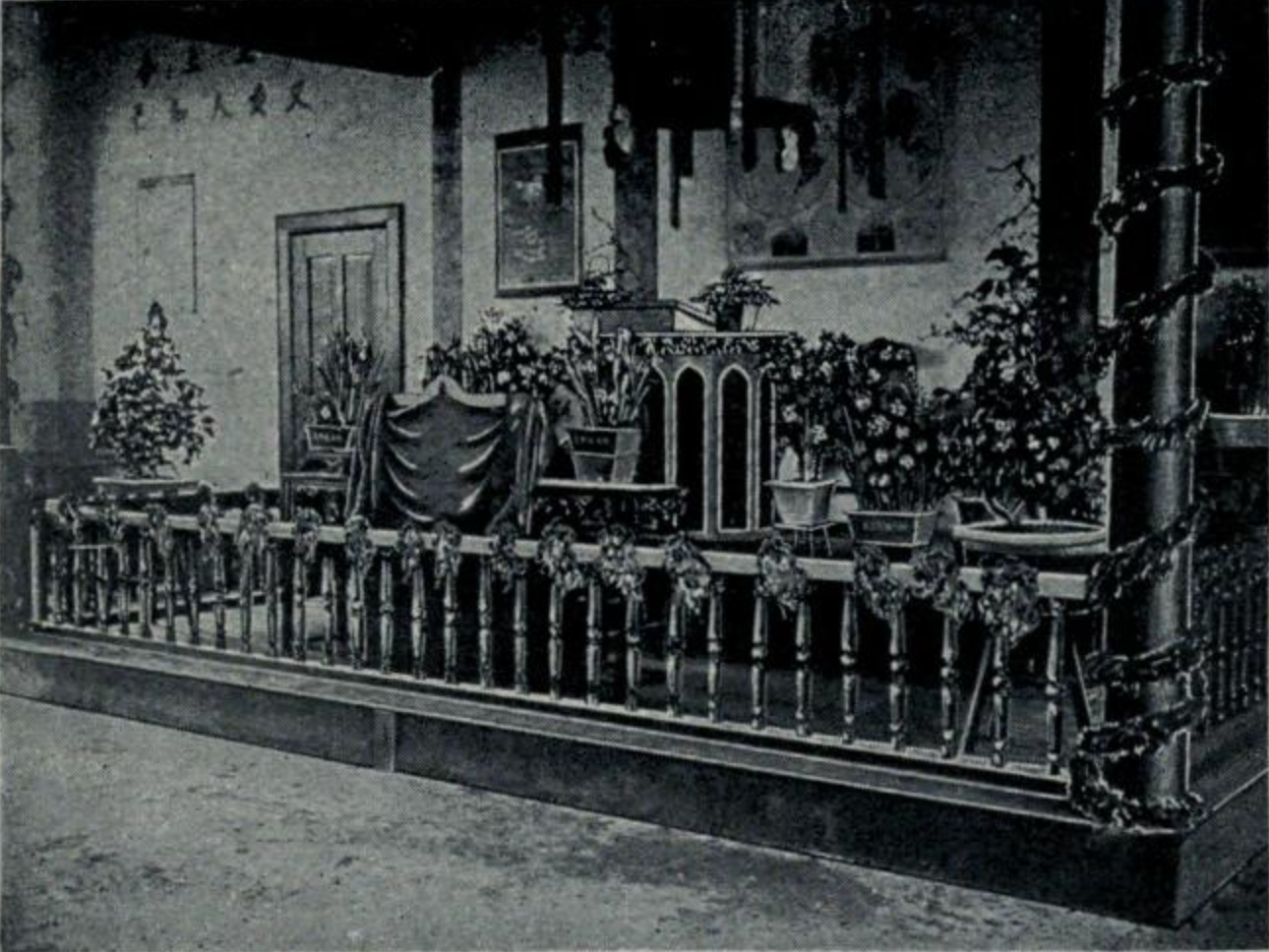
Interior of Sï-Shen-Tsï Chapel, decorated for Christmas, before 1903

== See also ==
- Omar Leslie Kilborn
- Methodism in Sichuan
- St John's Anglican Church, Chengdu
