= Canadian Methodist Mission =

Canadian Methodist missionary organization

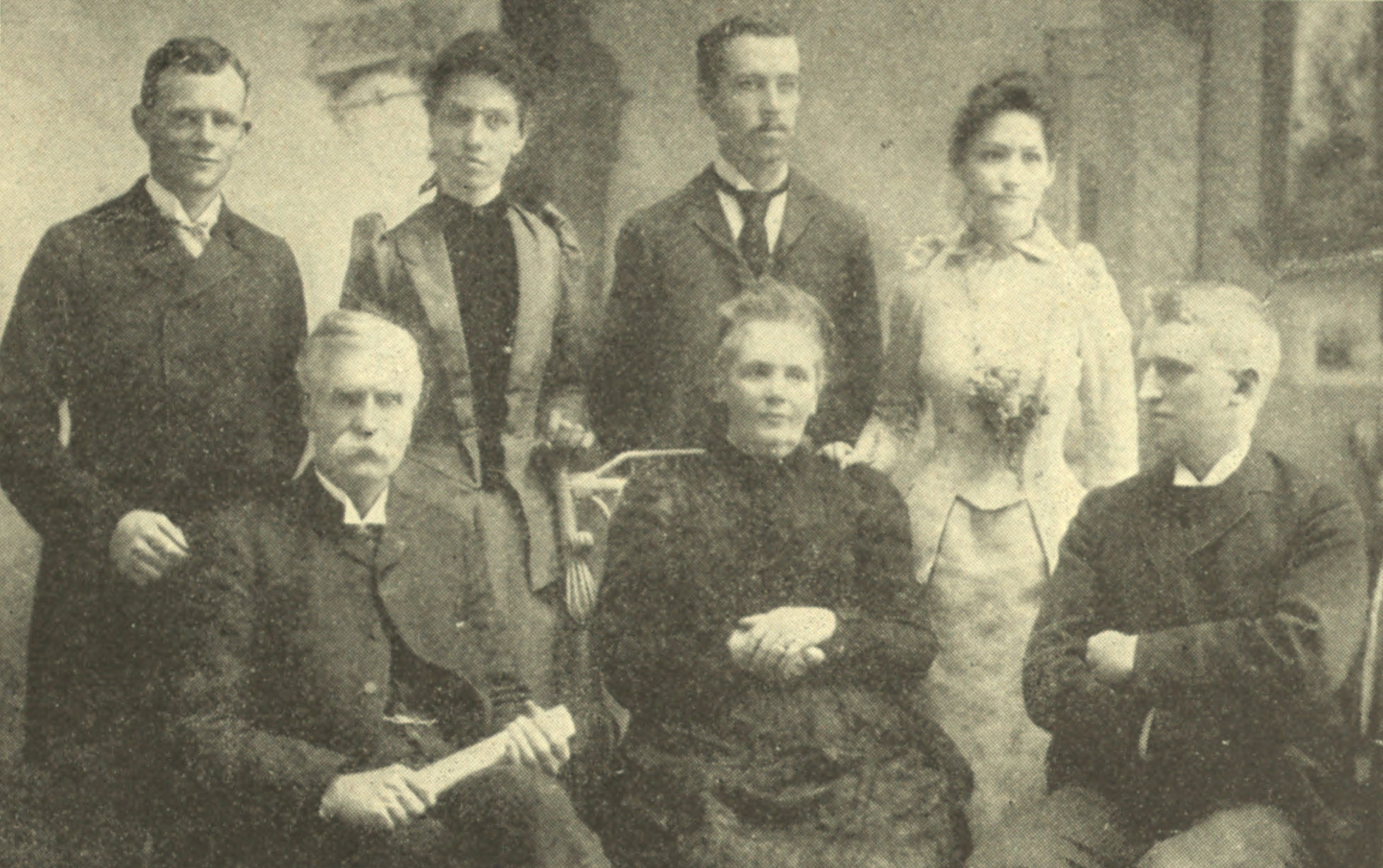
- First Canadian Methodist missionaries to Szechwan, sailed in 1891. Standing: Rev. G. E. Hartwell, Mrs. Hartwell, Rev. O. L. Kilborn, Mrs. Kilborn. Seated: Rev. V. C. Hart, Mrs. Hart, Dr. D. W. Stevenson.
- Founder: Virgil C. Hart
- Founded at: Toronto, Canada
- Type: Methodist mission
- Legal status: Mission society
- Headquarters: Chengtu
- Region served: Szechwan
- Official language: English; Szechwanese
- Key people: Virgil C. Hart; Omar L. Kilborn
- Parent organization: Methodist Church of Canada; United Church of Canada (since 1925)

The Canadian Methodist Mission (CMM), also known as Missionary Society of the Methodist Church in Canada (MCC; Chinese: 美道會; pinyin: Měi Dào Huì; Wade–Giles: Mei^{3} Tao^{4} Hui^{4}; lit. 'Beautiful Way Society'; former romanization: Mei Dao Hwei or Meh Dao Hwei; also known as Ying Mei Hui [Chinese: 英美會; pinyin: Yīng Měi Huì; Wade–Giles: Ying^{1} Mei^{3} Hui^{4}; lit. 'Anglo-American Society']), was a Canadian Methodist Christian missionary society mostly working in the province of Szechwan, which was also referred to as "West China."

== History ==
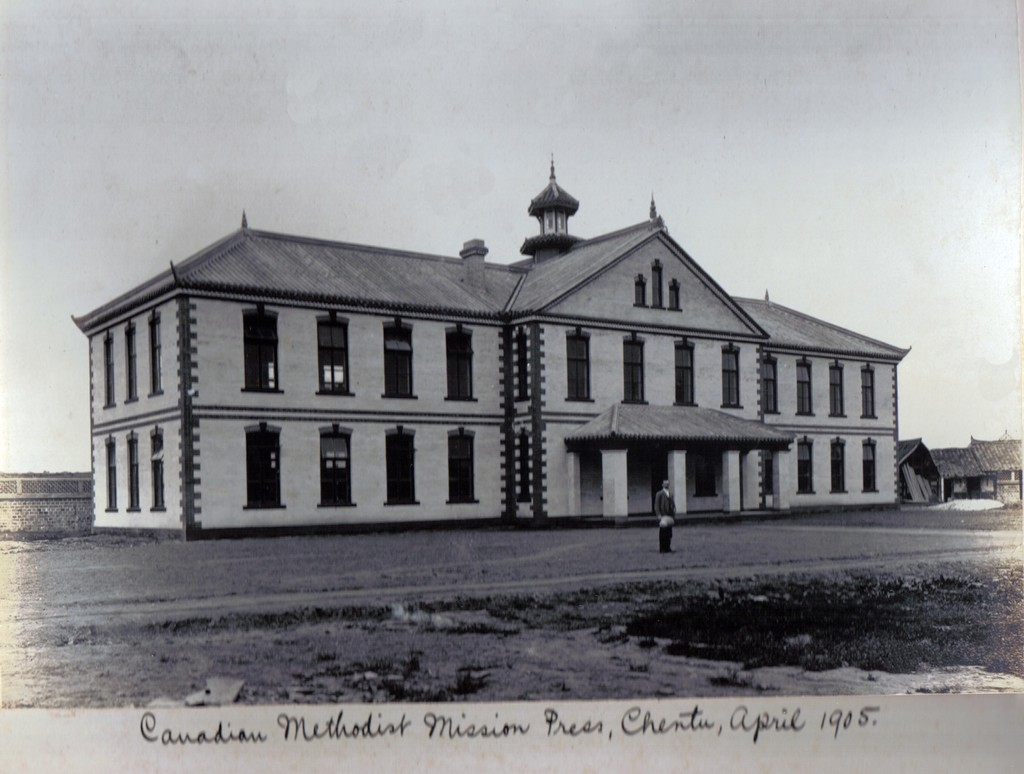
The new Canadian Methodist Mission Press at Chengtu, April 1905.

The Canadian Methodist Mission was founded by Virgil C. Hart. In February 1892, eight members of the mission society led by Hart reached Szechwan. Work began in Chengtu and, two years later, in Kiatingfu, with the establishment of mission stations in both cities. A church and a hospital were subsequently built in Chengtu, which was the result of a team effort by O. L. Kilborn, V. C. Hart, G. E. Hartwell, D. W. Stevenson and others.

After 1900, eight more mission stations were established in Jenshow (1905), Junghsien (1905), Penghsien (1907), Tzeliutsing (1907), Luchow (1908), Chungking (1910), Chungchow (1911) and Fowchow (1913).

The CMM established its own printing house, Canadian Methodist Mission Press, in Kiatingfu in 1897. In 1903, it was moved to the capital city of Chengtu. This press was responsible for the printing of The West China Missionary News (1899–1943) and Journal of the West China Border Research Society (1922–1945). The former was the first and the longest running English newspaper in the province of Szechwan.

The CMM was one of the four mission societies responsible for the creation of West China Union University in 1910. By 1922, the Methodists enrolled almost one half of the Protestant Christians in Szechwan.

Following the merger of the Methodist Church of Canada into the United Church of Canada in 1925, the latter assumed responsibility for the CMM. At that time, the CMM was the largest mission of the newly-founded Church.

By 1934, the CMM had joined the Church of Christ in China (CCC); an annual general meeting of the CCC's Szechwan Synod was held on 9 February 1939.

== Gallery ==
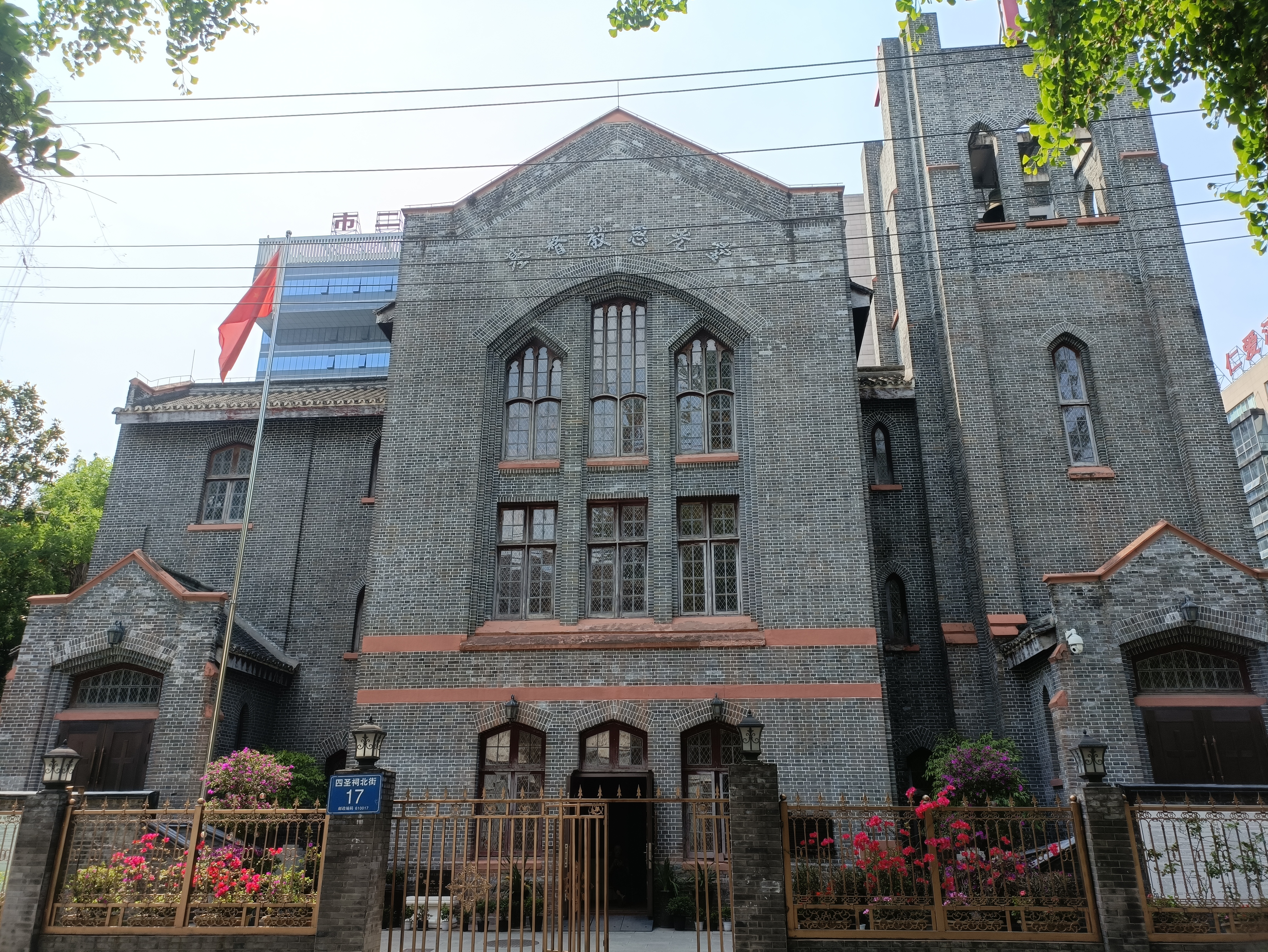
Canadian Methodist Sï-Shen-Tsï Church at Chengtu

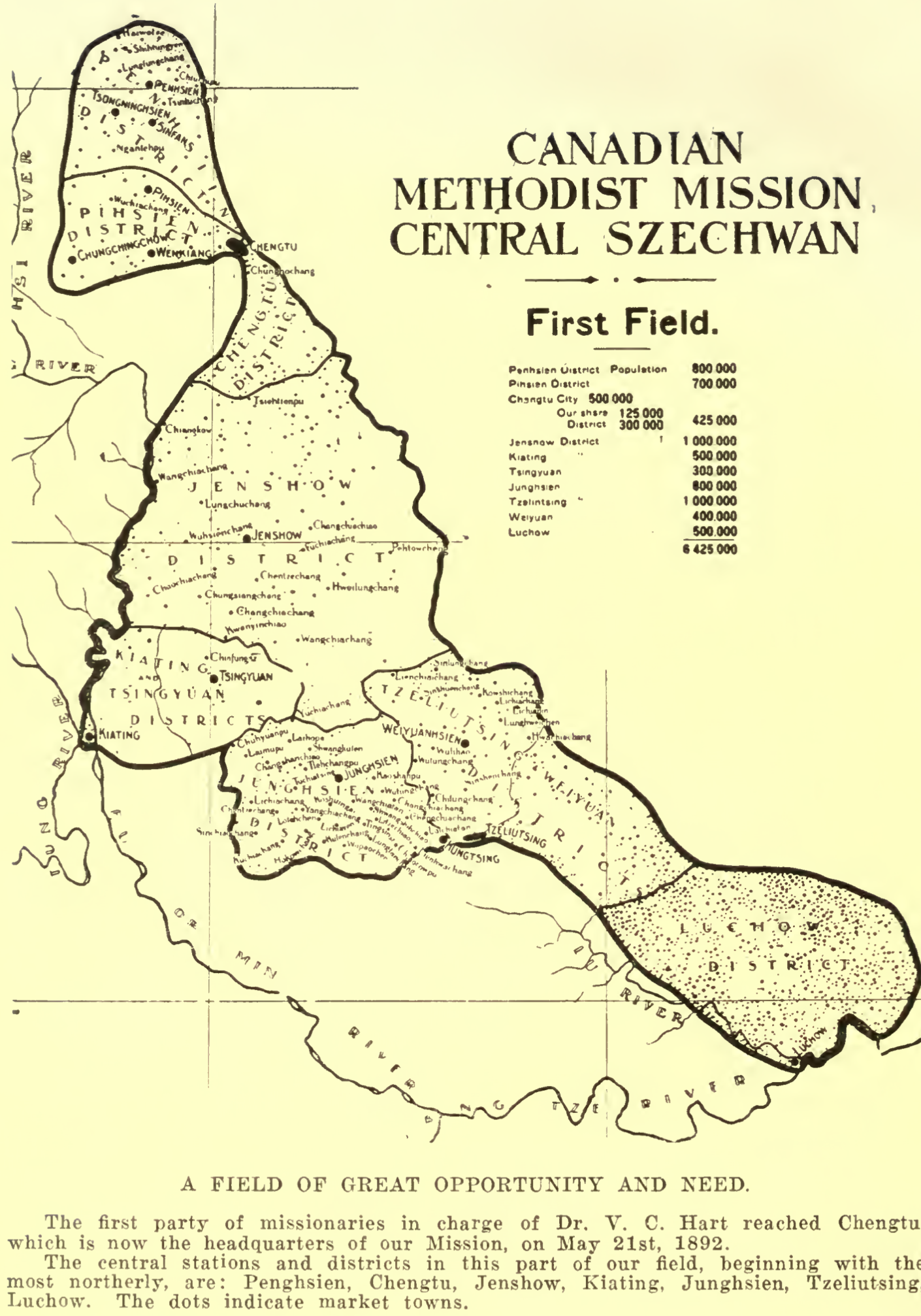
Canadian Methodist Mission in Central Szechwan

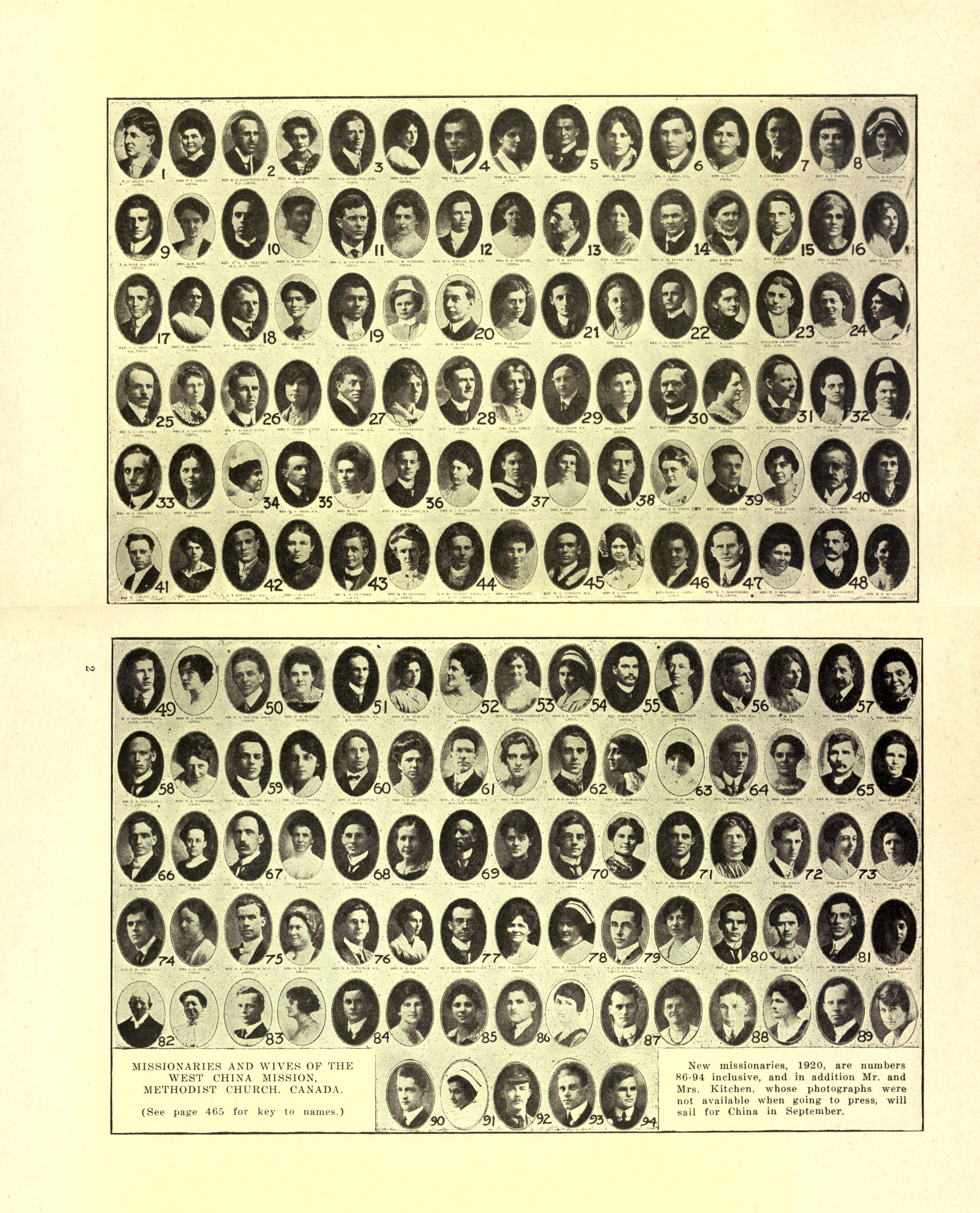
Canadian Methodist missionaries stationed in Szechwan

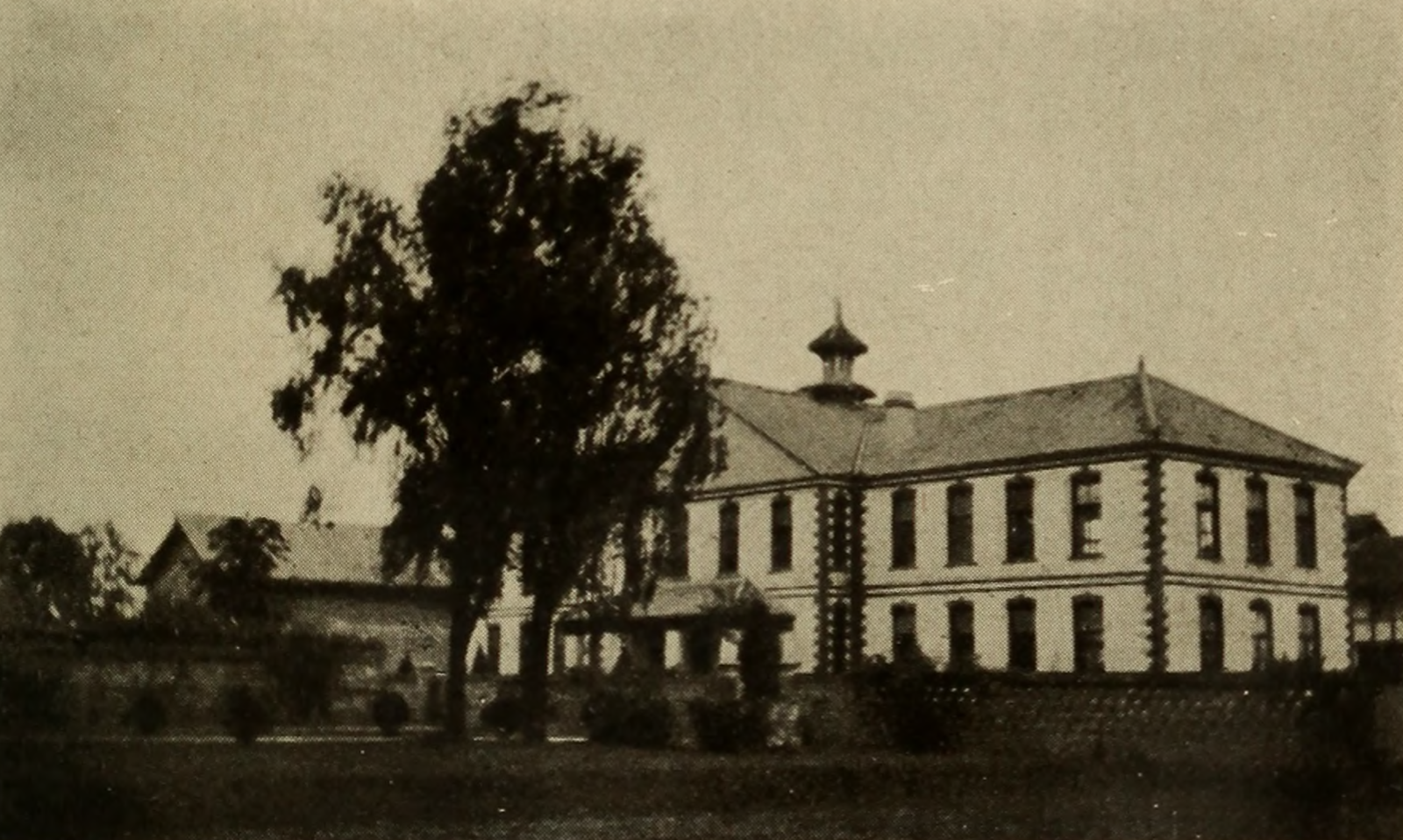
The first Canadian Methodist Mission Press at Kiating, before 1903

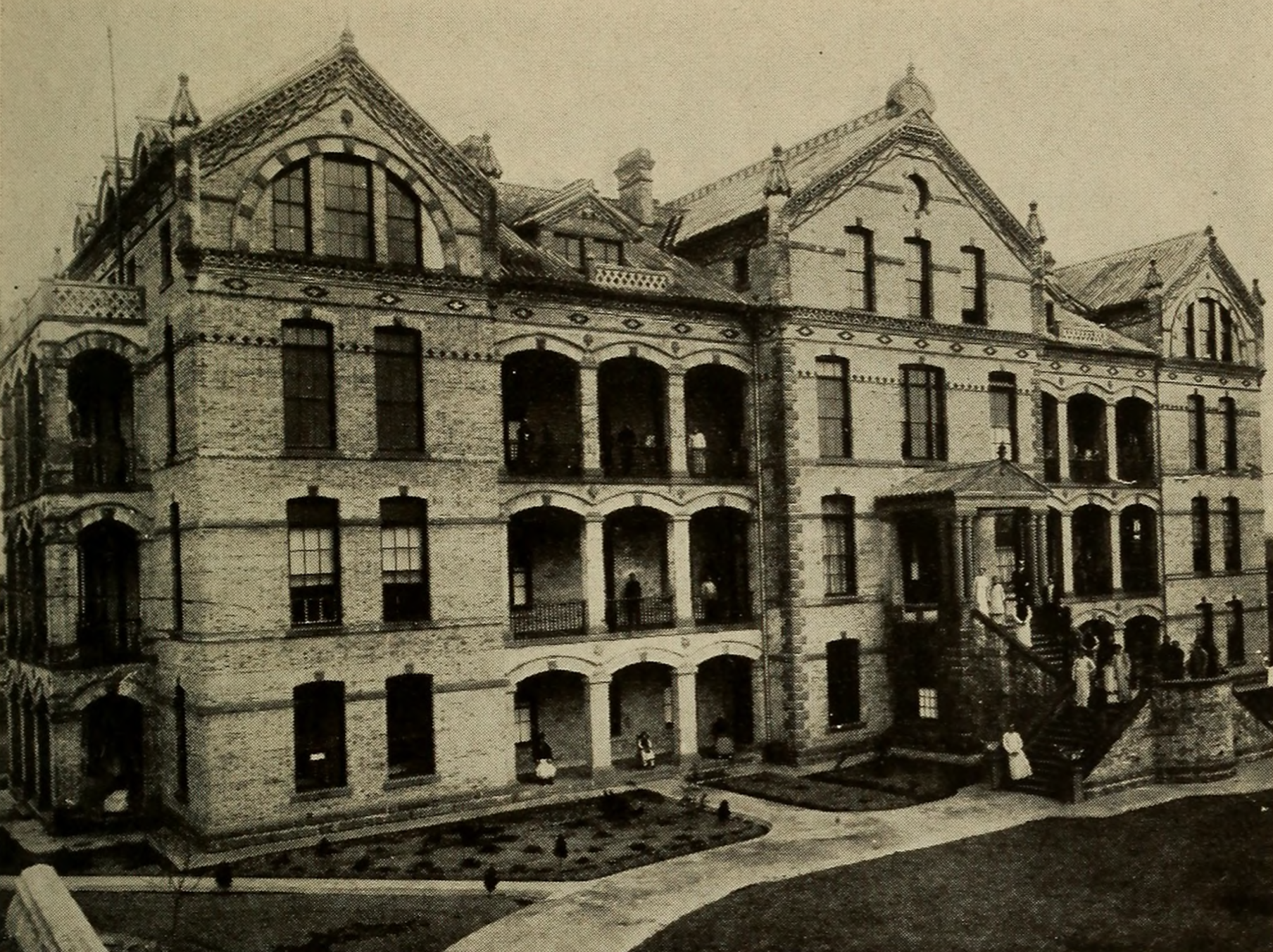
Canadian Methodist Hospital at Chengtu, before 1917

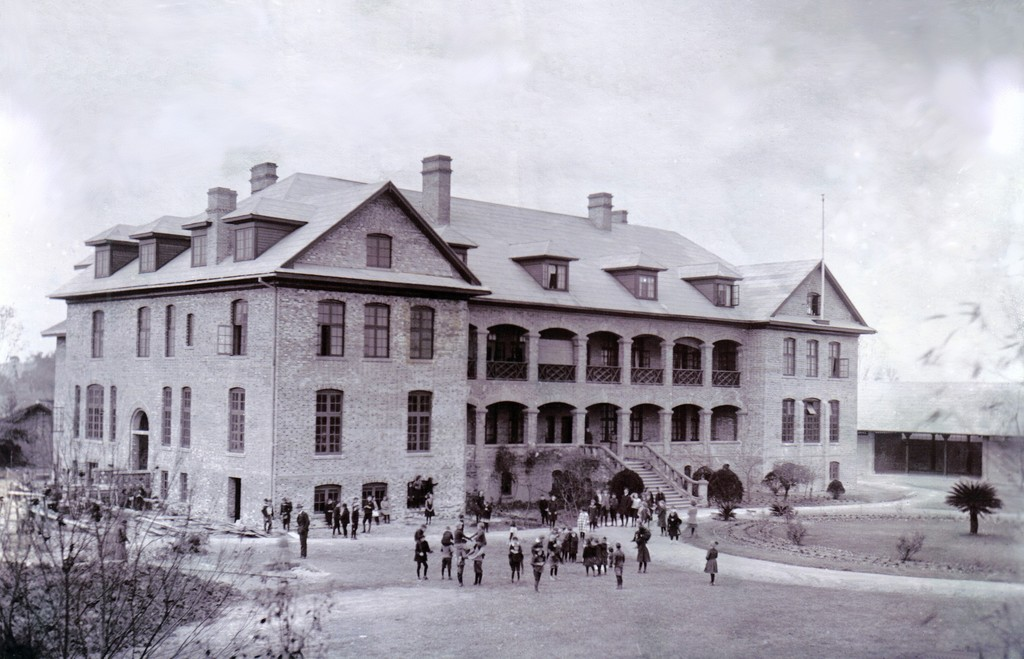
The Canadian School of the West China Union University, Chengtu, c. 1918

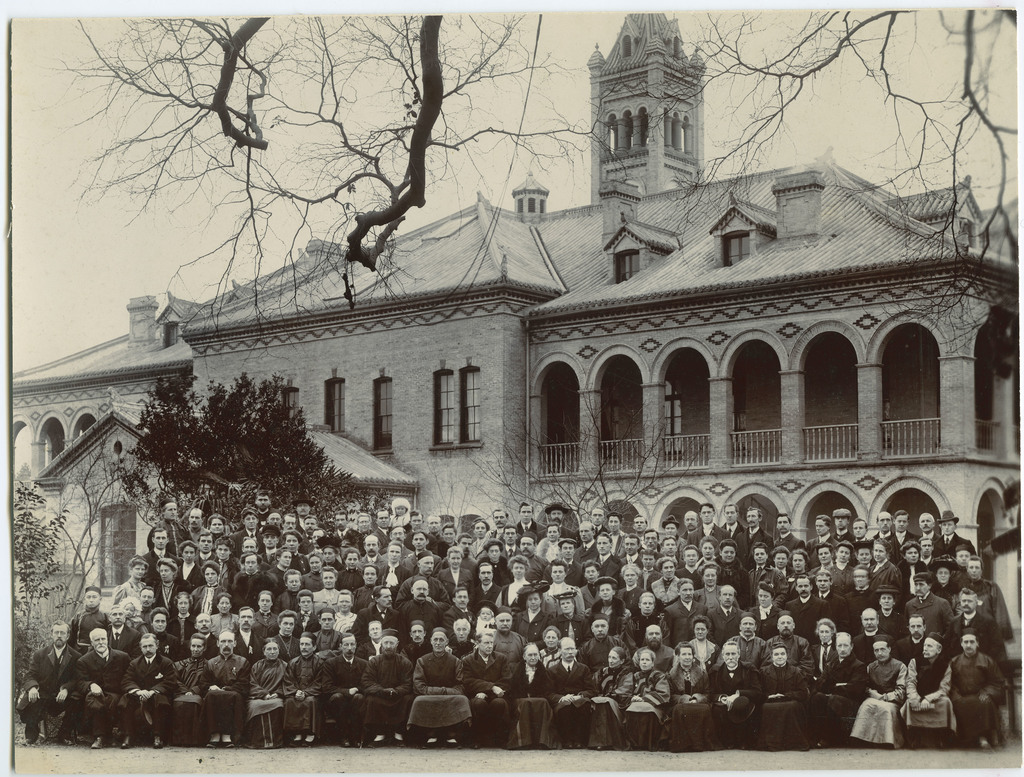
Forward Movement, Missionary Conference of American and Canadian Methodists, Chengtu, 1908

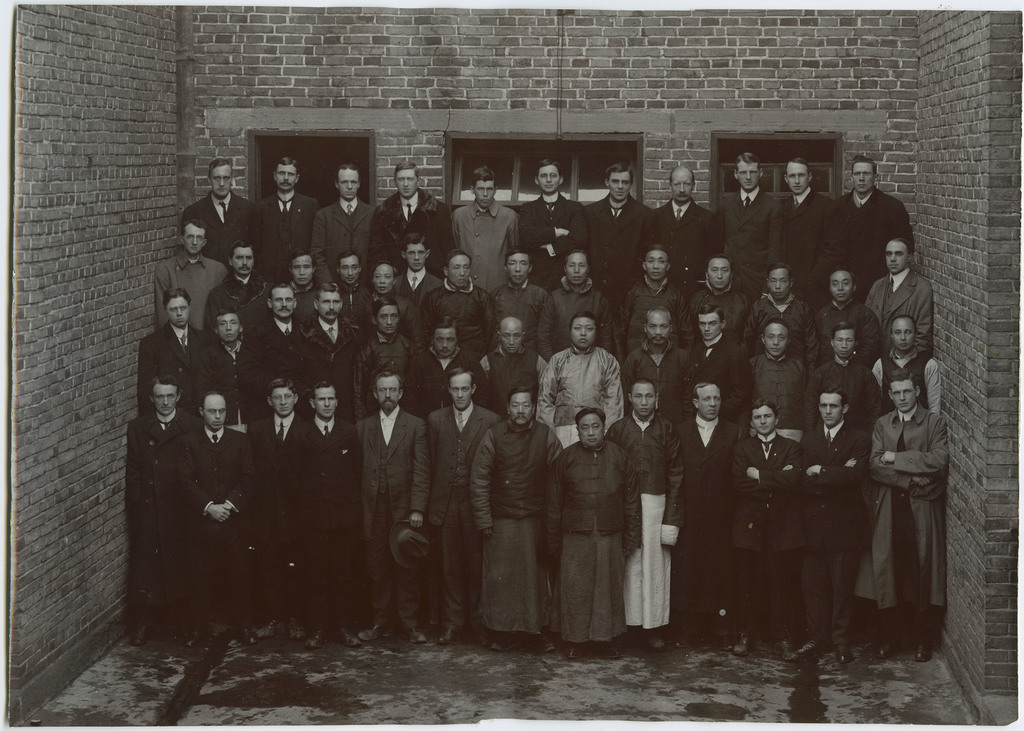
CMM West China Mission Annual Conference, Chungking, 1914

== See also ==
- Anglican Diocese of Szechwan
- American Methodist Episcopal Mission

== Bibliography ==
- Our West China Mission. Toronto: The Missionary Society of the Methodist Church. 1920.
- Stauffer, Milton T., ed. (1922). The Christian Occupation of China. Shanghai: China Continuation Committee.
