= Protestantism in Sichuan =

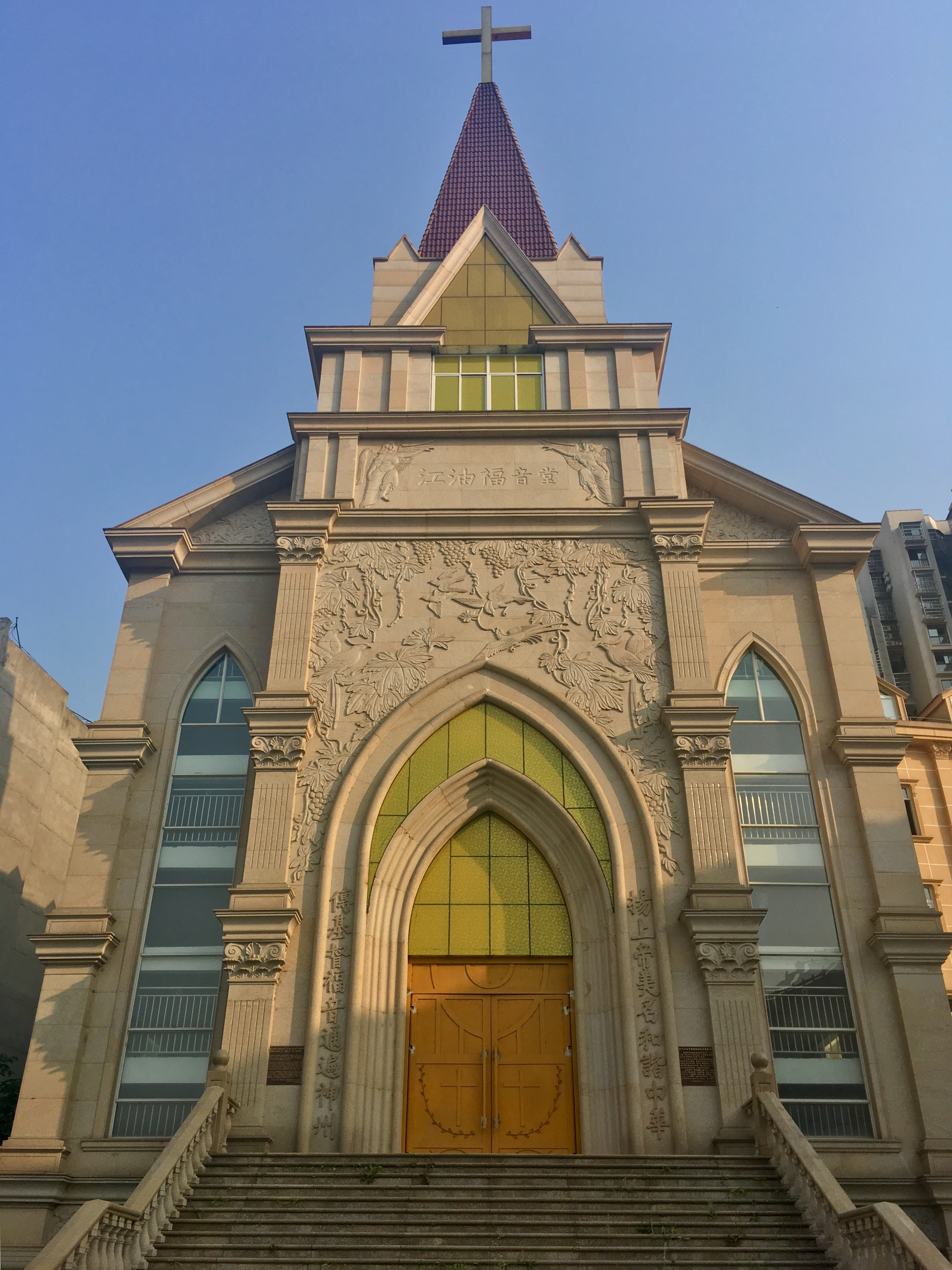
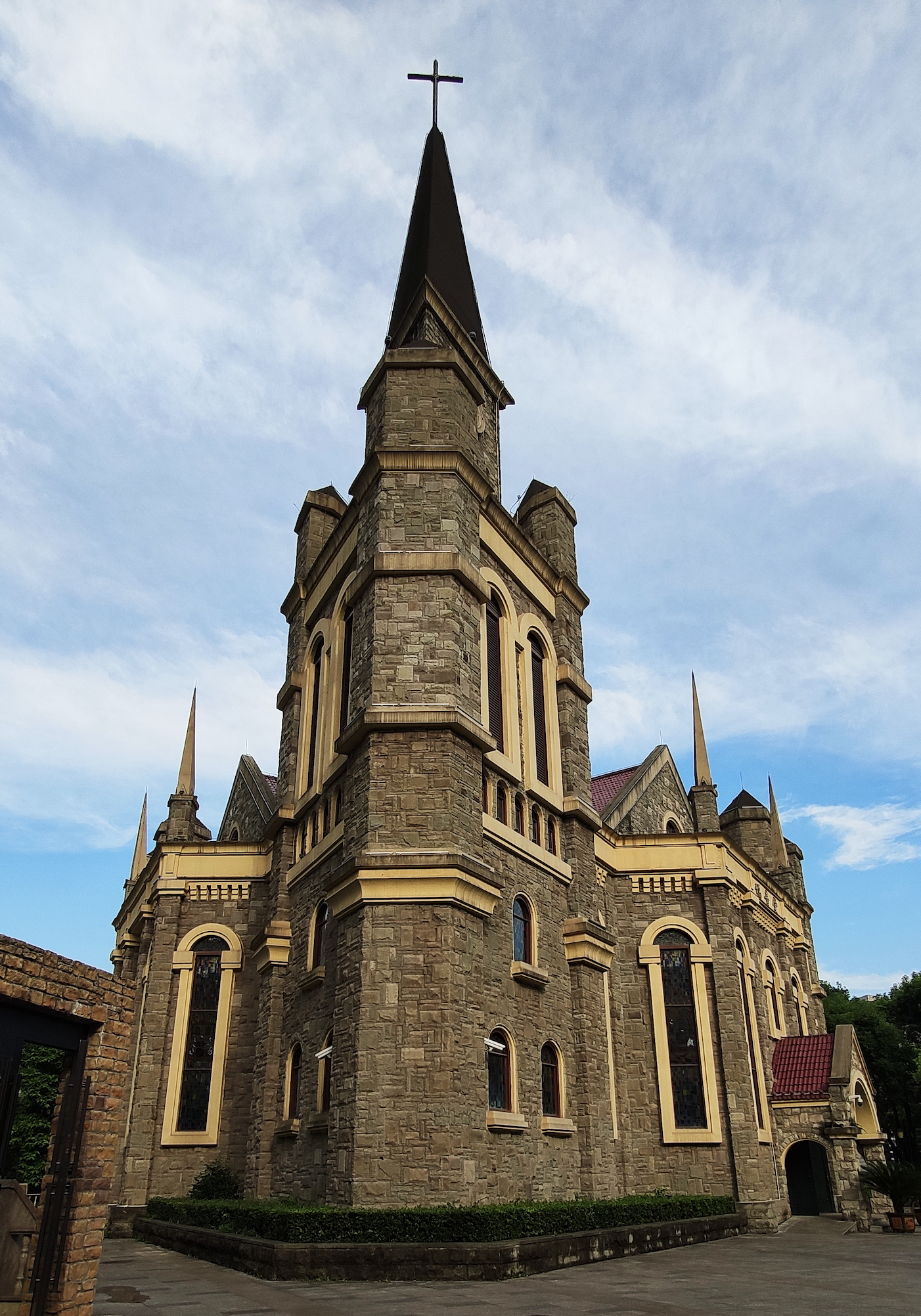
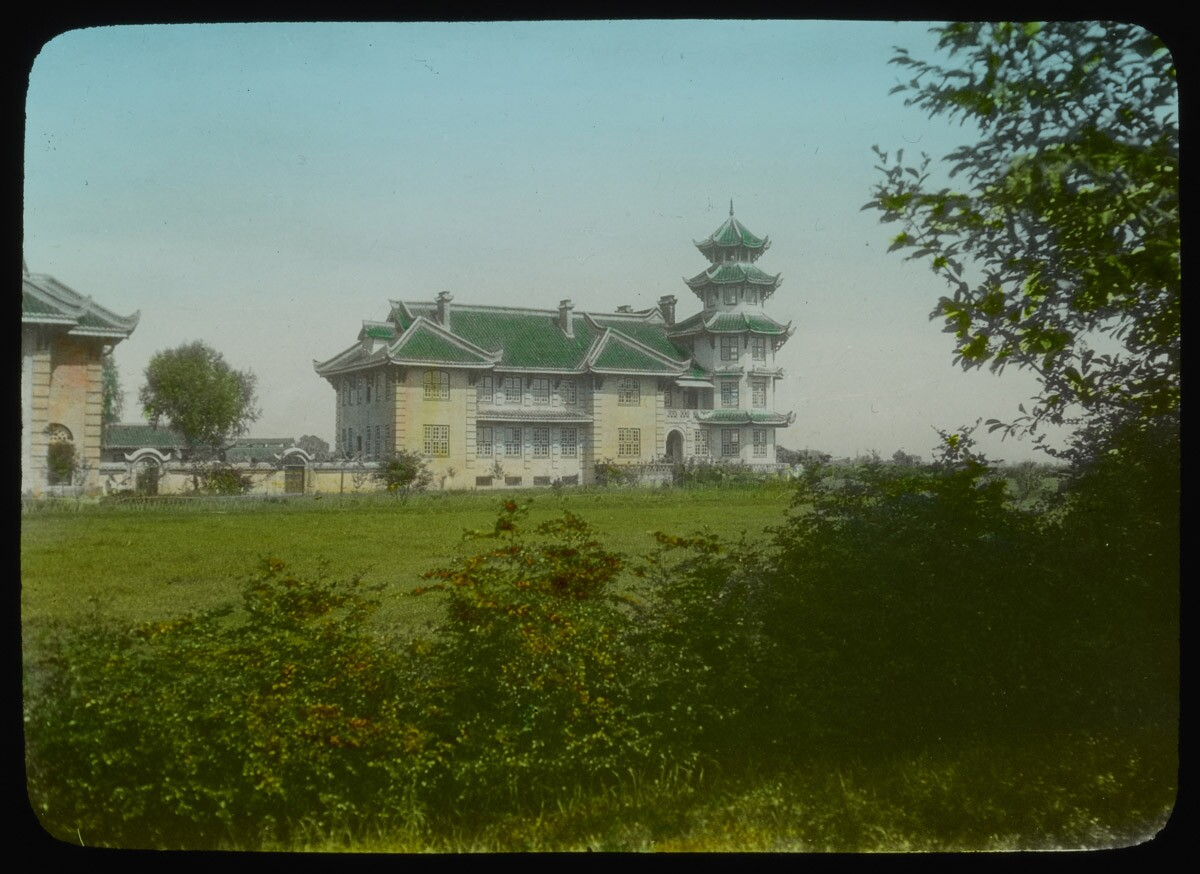
Clockwise from upper left: Gospel Church, Chungpa (Anglican); Gospel Church, Chungking (Methodist); West China Union University at Chengtu, created by mission societies of four denominations, namely, American Baptist, American Methodist, Canadian Methodist and British Quakers.

The Protestant mission began in the southwestern Chinese province of Sichuan (Note: Formerly romanized as Szechwan, Szechuan, or Ssuchʻuan; also commonly referred to as "West China" or "Western China".) in 1877, when premises were rented by the China Inland Mission in Chungking. However, compared with Catholicism, which had been spread throughout the province for over two centuries at the time, it grew rather slowly, it was not until the late 1980s that Protestantism experienced rapid growth. The two largest denominations in the province before 1950 were Anglicanism and Methodism.

== History ==
=== 19th century ===
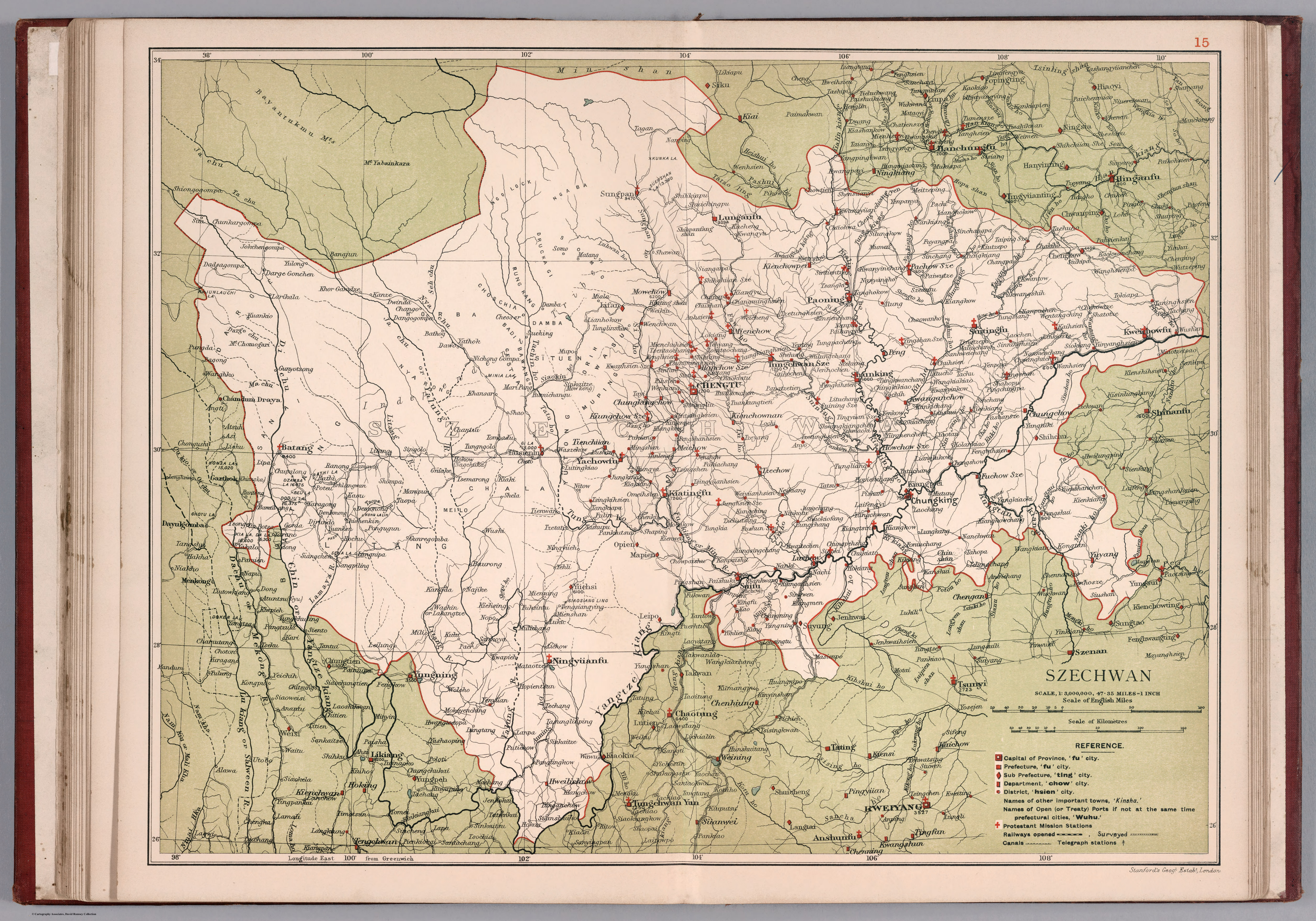
Map of Szechwan specially prepared by Edward Stanford for the China Inland Mission (CIM). The CIM carried out the first Protestant mission in Sichuan, in 1877.

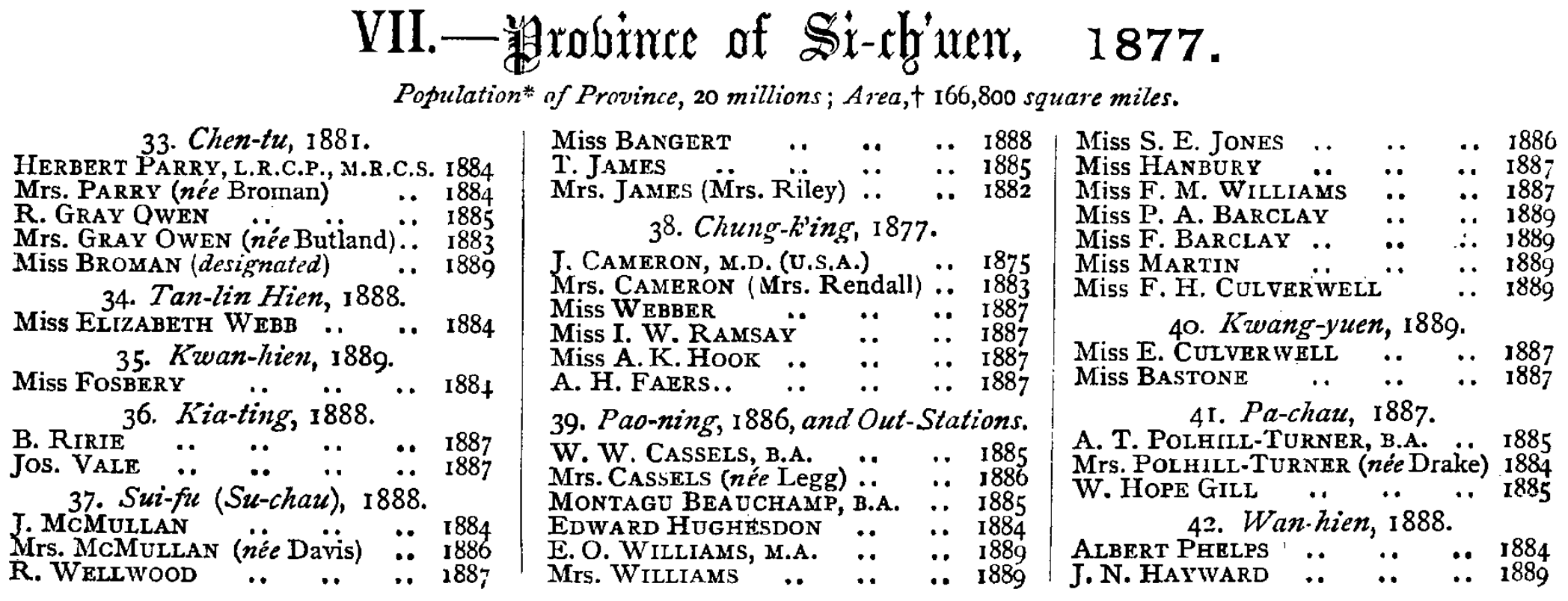
CIM stations and missionaries in Sichuan up to 1889.

Previous to the year 1868, the Protestant Churches of Europe and North America knew little or nothing about the province of Sichuan located in western China. The first Protestant missionaries to visit the province were Griffith John of the London Missionary Society (LMS) and Alexander Wylie of the British and Foreign Bible Society (BFBS). However, this journey did not attempt to establish mission stations in any of the many cities or towns visited. Griffith John's report of the journey was undoubtedly instrumental in drawing attention to that region: "There are a large number of Catholics in the province, and Chungking is one of their strongholds. [...] We must not ignore Szechwan. I hope that we will be able to establish the first Protestant Church in Chungking, and I myself could be the first missionary." However, no other missionaries visited the province again until 1877, when Rev. John McCarthy of the China Inland Mission (CIM, interdenominational), after landing at Wanhsien, travelled via Shuenkingfu to Chungking, where he reached on 1 May of that year. There he rented premises for other CIM missionaries to use as a base.

After this there followed a period of widespread evangelistic journeys, in which Messrs. Cameron, Nicoll, Easton, Parker, Riley, S. R. Clarke, and Baller, all of the CIM, with Mr. Leaman of the American Presbyterian Mission, and Mr. Mollman of the BFBS, engaged. In 1881 the CIM opened the capital, Chengtu, for settled work. After considerable difficulty, Paoning and Pacheo were occupied during the years 1886 and 1887.

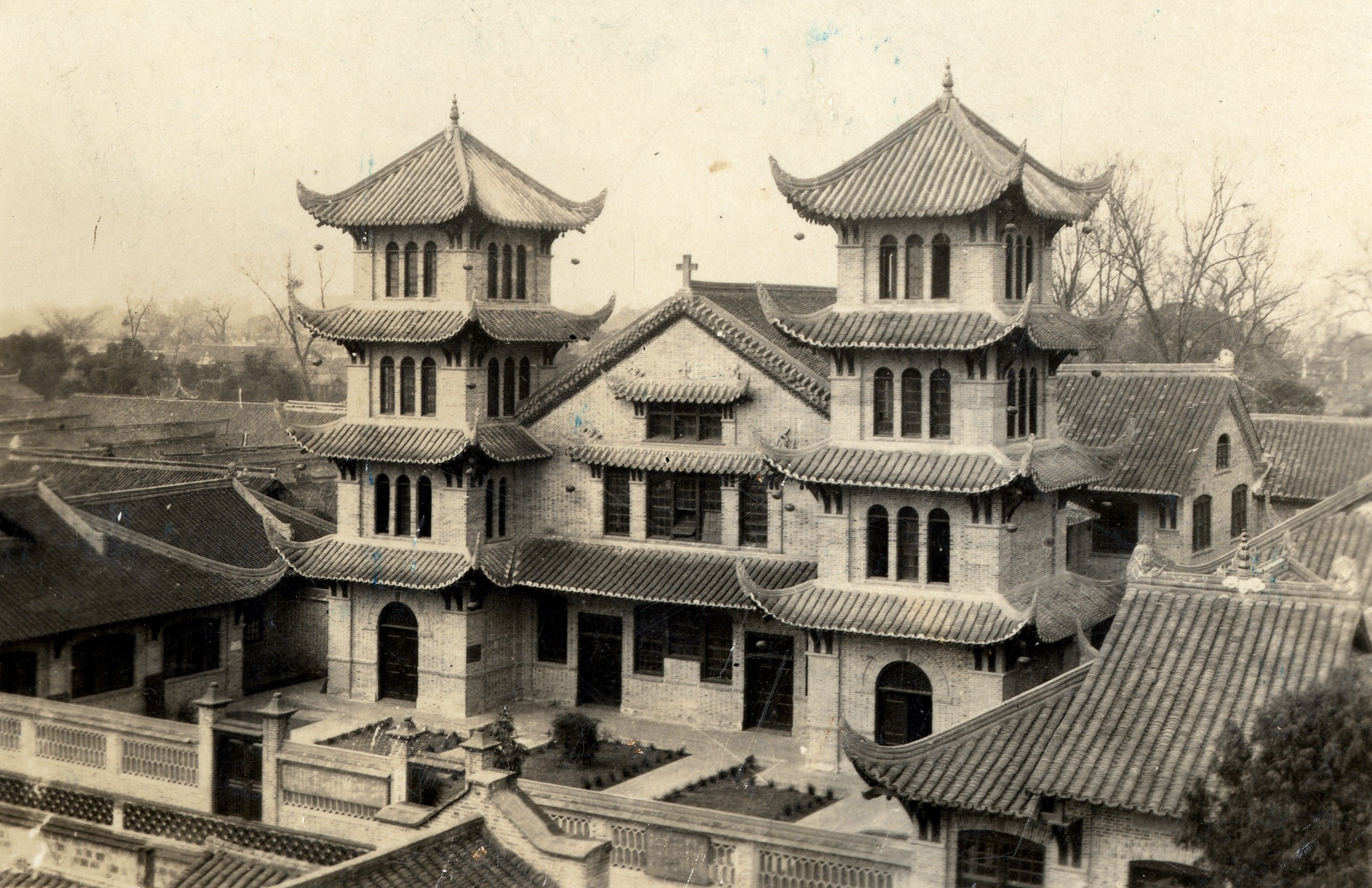
American Methodist Institutional Church at Chengtu, circa 1920.

In 1882, missionaries of the American Methodist Episcopal Mission (AMEM) arrived in Chungking. Their early efforts encountered strong resistance and riots that led to the abandonment of the mission. It was not until 1889 that these Methodists came back and started the mission again. Their mission concentrated within a diamond-shaped area with the cities of Chengtu, Suining, Tzechung and Chungking as bases. They had an Institutional Church built in Chengtu and a Lewis Memorial Institutional Church in Chungking.

During this period, the CIM divided the work of the mission into two distinct parts, namely Western Szechwan and Eastern Szechwan. The distinction is that, taking the Kialing River, which enters the Yangtse opposite Chungking, as the boundary, all the cities, towns, and villages east of this belonged to the East Szechwan branch of the Mission, which was worked on distinctively Church of England lines; while all the districts west of the Kialing River belonged to the West Szechwan branch of the CIM, and were generally worked on Free Church lines.

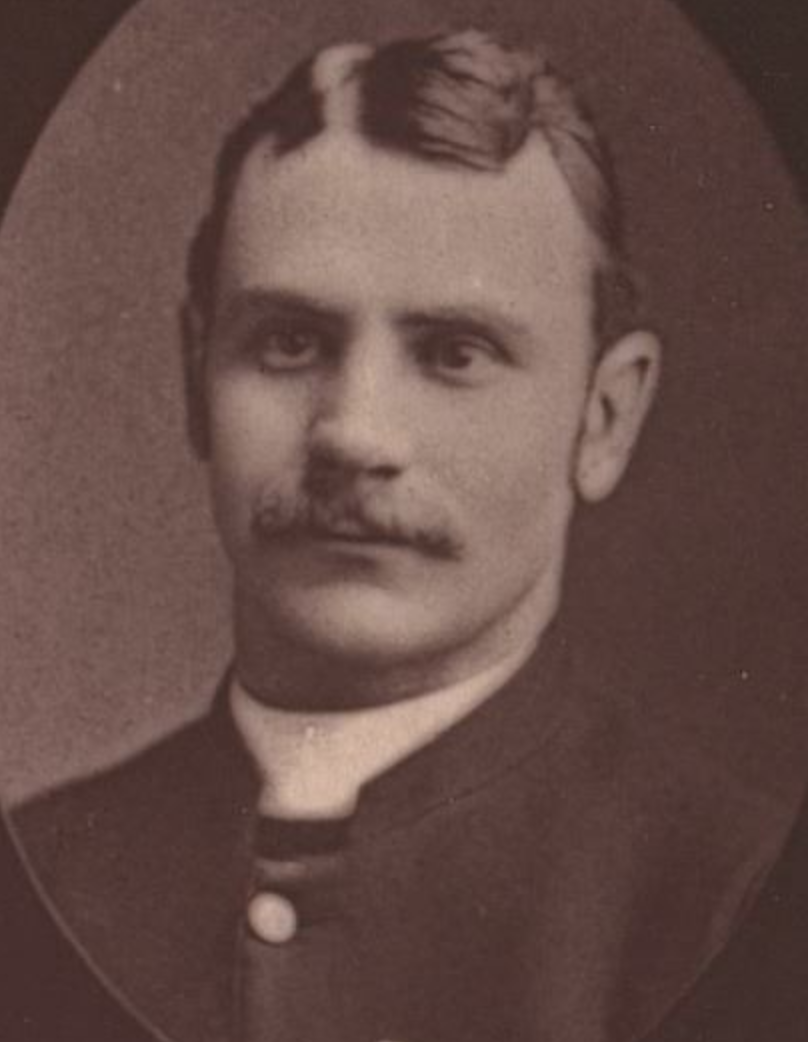
William Cassels, first Bishop of the Anglican Diocese of Szechwan.

The year 1887 marks the arrival of the Anglican representatives of the CIM, who were members of the Cambridge Seven, namely, William Cassels, future bishop of the Diocese of Szechwan; Montagu Proctor-Beauchamp, and two brothers, Arthur T. and Cecil H. Polhill. Cecil Polhill was at first based in Chengtu and Chungking, but he felt drawn towards the people of Tibet. In 1896, after helping with mission work in Kalimpong, India, he moved to Tatsienlu, a Khams Tibetan city west of Sichuan. The establishing of a missionary station there in 1897 paved the way for the future construction of the Gospel Church of Tatsienlu.

One feature of this period was the persistence and tenacity of the missionaries. Many difficulties and disappointments accompanied their efforts; the people were either indifferent or hostile, and the results of their labours were very small. Sickness and death were constantly occurring to hinder and threaten the existence of the work. The 1886 Chungking riot almost extinguished the little churches which had been gathered by the two Missions. After the settlement of the Chungking riots and the re-establishment of Mission work in that city, a period of unprecedented prosperity set in.

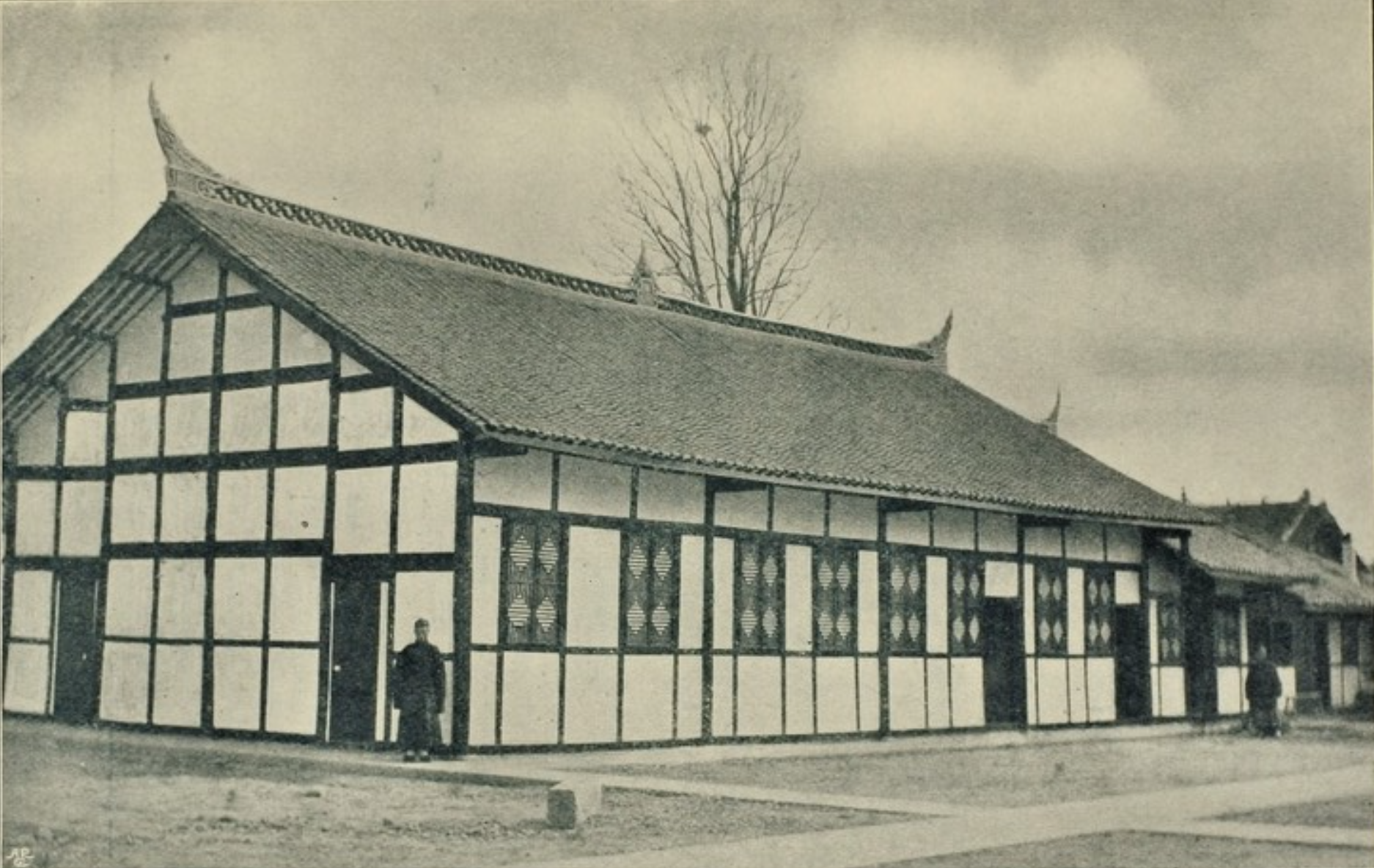
English Quaker meeting house at Tungchwan, before 1905.

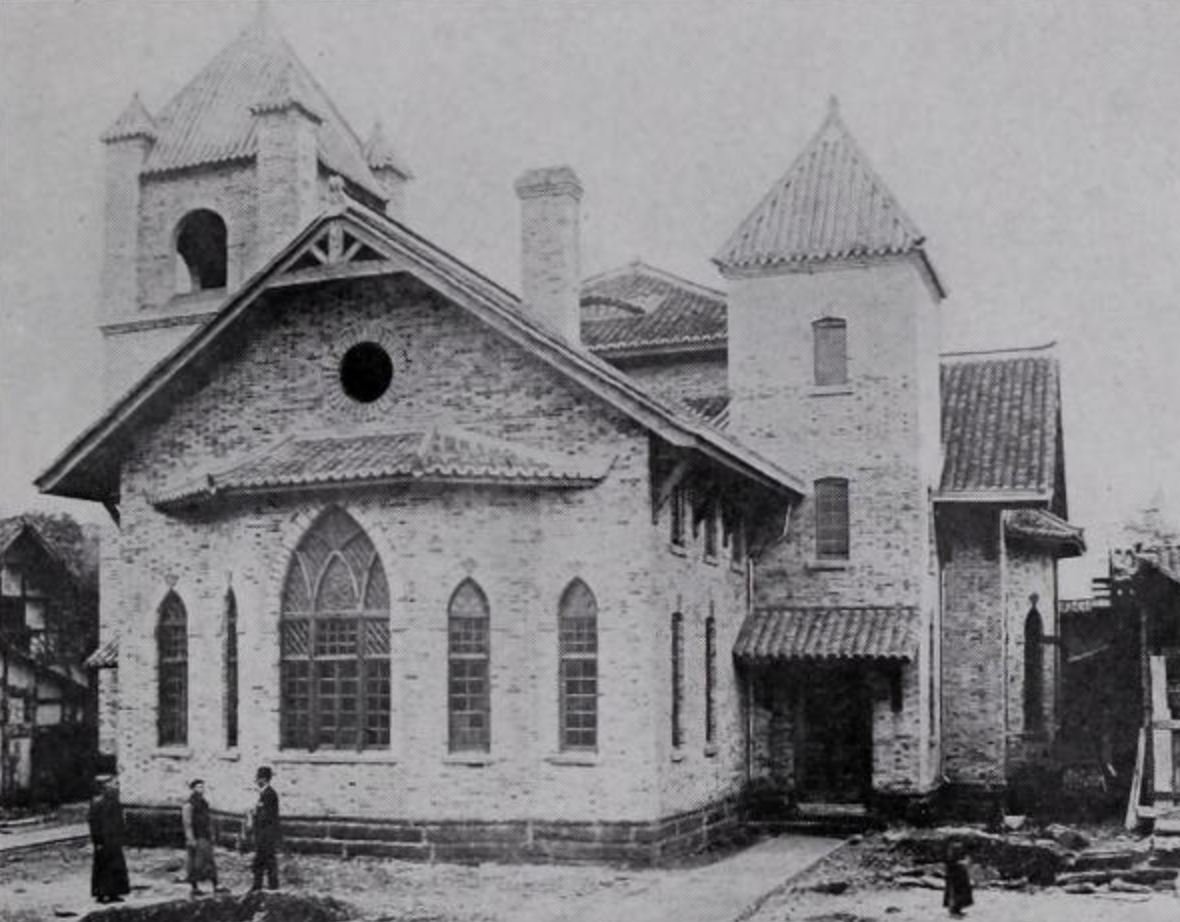
American Baptist church at Yachowfu, 1920.

During this period no less than five additional missionary societies started new work in Sichuan. In 1888 the LMS, whose representative Dr. Griffith John, was the first to enter the province in 1868 as mentioned above, took up permanent work in Chungking. In 1889, Robert John and Mary Jane Davidson of Friends' Foreign Mission Association (FFMA) introduced Quakerism into Tungchwan. Within 19 years five monthly meetings were successively established in Chengtu, Chungking, Tungchwan, Tungliang and Suining. In 1890 the American Baptist Missionary Union (ABMU) started work in the west of the province, having Suifu (1890) and Kiatingfu (1894) as their chief centres. Three more stations were established in Yachowfu (1894), Ningyuanfu (1905), and Chengtu (1909). At the close of 1891, the Rev. James Heywood Horsburgh, together with Mrs. Horsburgh, Rev. O. M. Jackson, three laymen, and six single women missionaries, entered Sichuan as the first band of Church Missionary Society (CMS) missionaries to take up work in that province. By 1894, CMS work had started in Mienchow, Chungpa, Anhsien, Mienchu and Sintu. Their first church was founded in 1894 in Chungpa. Then, in 1892, the Canadian Methodist Mission (CMM) opened up work in central and west Sichuan, having Chengtu and Kiating as their headquarters.

In 1895, the Anglican Diocese of Szechwan was established with its seat in Paoning. William Cassels became the first diocesan bishop after his consecration on 18 October 1895 at Westminster Abbey. That same year was also marked by a serious outbreak of anti-foreign agitation began in the capital Chengtu, and thence spread throughout the province. In the capital, the property of three Protestant missions and that of the Roman Catholics was destroyed; and all missionaries of all missions, Protestant and Roman Catholic alike, were thankful to escape with their lives.

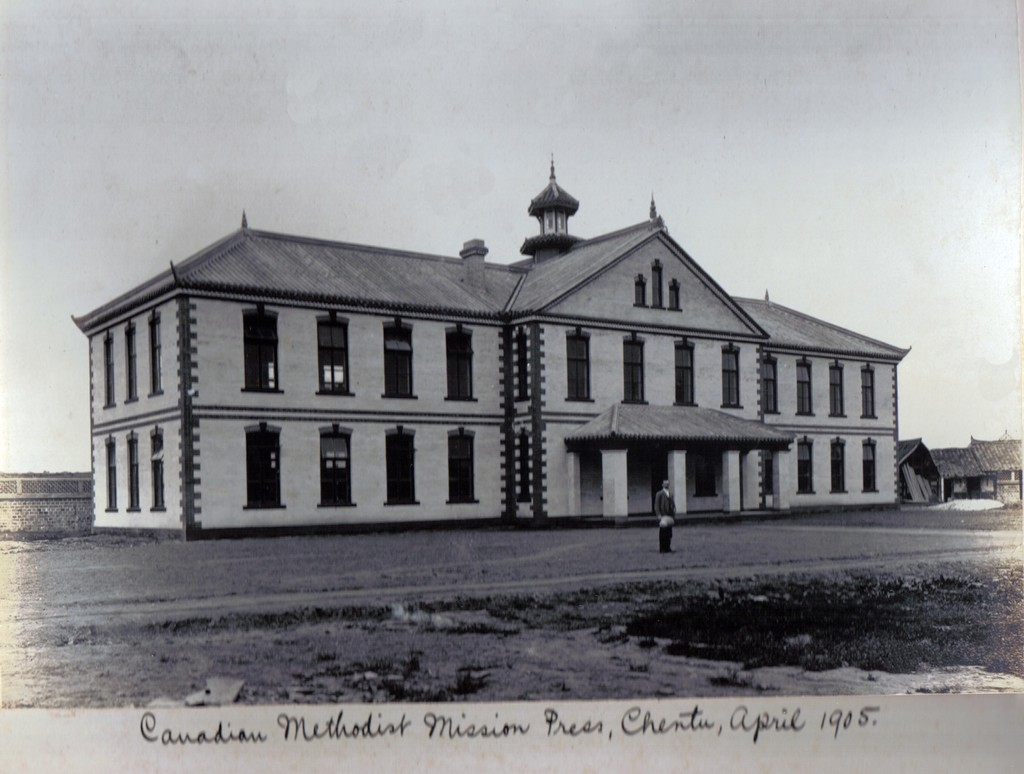
Canadian Methodist Mission Press at Chengtu, April 1905.

The West China Missionary News, printed by the Canadian Methodist Mission Press.

In 1897, the Canadian Methodist Mission Press was established in Kiatingfu, but was moved to the capital city of Chengtu in 1903. This press produced publications mostly in English, Tibetan, Chinese and Hua Miao, but also printed language lessons in French and German. In addition to printing for the various missions in the western province, a certain amount of work was done for local schools and non-missionary foreigners. Notable among its printings was The West China Missionary News, first published in 1899, being the first and longest-running English-language newspaper in Sichuan province.

In 1898, a riot known as the Yü Man-tse Rebellion was chiefly directed against the Roman Catholics; the Protestants not coming under the wrath of the rebels, though subject to persecution and petty annoyance from local rowdies. During this rebellion a Protestant Conference (January 1899) was held at Chungking, resulting in the establishments of The West China Missionary News and West China Tract Society, as well as the formation of an Advisory Board for West China. From the settlement of the Yü Man-tse Rebellion of 1898 to the Boxer Rebellion in 1900, a period of nearly two years, the work in Sichuan enjoyed a time of peace and quiet, which ended abruptly in the summer of 1900, when all missionaries of all societies were obliged by consular orders to flee to the coast.

=== 20th century ===
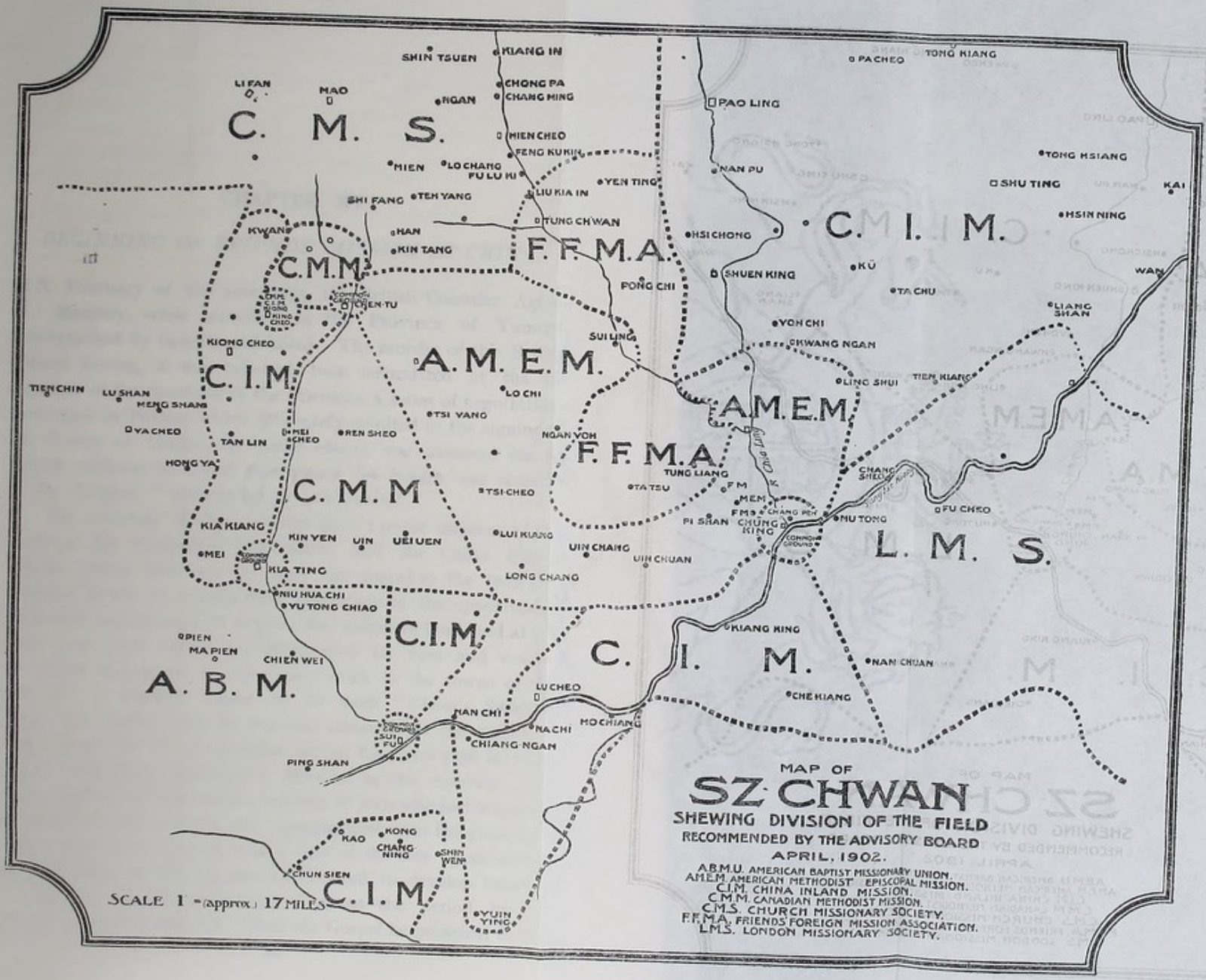
Map of Szechwan showing division of the field by seven Protestant mission societies in 1902: ABM, AMEM, CIM, CMM, CMS, FFMA, and LMS.

The Boxer Rebellion did not affect Sichuan so much as some other parts of China. On the return of the missionaries to their respective stations during the early part of 1901 they found in many places, especially in the western parts of Sichuan, what was going to be known later as the Mass Movement in full swing. This movement may be traced back as far as 1895, when it really began, subsequent to the settlement of the riots which occurred at that time. This movement steadily grew till it was crushed by the Yü Man-tse Rebellion, but immediately after the settlement of those troubles it revived with fresh vigour and strength. During that time, however, it was almost entirely confined to the Roman Catholic Church. But after the Boxer settlement, the Mass Movement not only revived amongst the Roman Catholics, but also took hold of the Protestant Church as well. This movement was most perplexing, even to experienced missionaries. Deputations were constantly arriving from the surrounding districts with offers from the gentry and leading men to open Gospel halls, preaching stations, or schools, free of cost to the missionary societies. Long lists were presented with the names of those who were anxious to become "adherents" of the Church or "learners" of the truth. This movement appealed in different ways to different missionaries and missionary societies. Some of the more optimistic welcomed it as an answer to the prayers of past years and the plenteous sowing of the last decades. Others, who were not quite so enthusiastic, looked askance on the movement, and generally discouraged the establishment of stations under such conditions.

A great demand for scientific literature which followed the Boxer outbreak was so pressing that the Society for the Diffusion of Christian Knowledge at Shanghai decided to open a depot in Chengtu to meet this demand. The Society was able to secure the best position in the most important street, and the ever increasing sale of books, charts, maps, and other literature has justified the Society's decision in opening a depot in that remote province of Western China. The Canadian Methodist Mission (CMM), recognising that Chengtu, the capital of the province, was the centre of literary activity and influence, moved their Mission Press to that city in 1903.

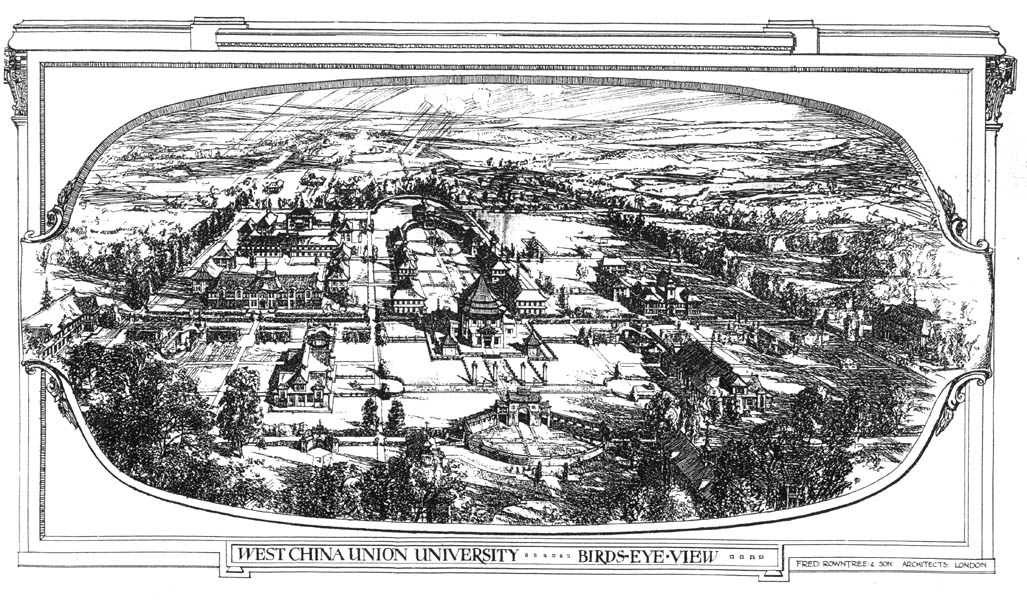
Frederick Rowntree's architectural drawing for West China Union University

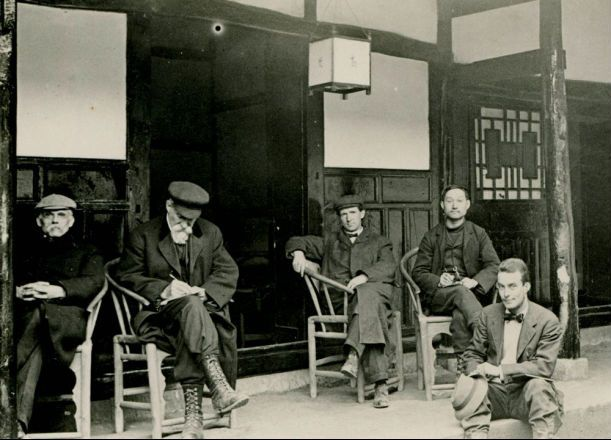
Joseph Beech (third from left) with (l to r) E. D. Burton (American Baptist biblical scholar), T. C. Chamberlin (American geologist), Y. T. Wang (interpreter) and R. T. Chamberlin (T. C. Chamberlin's son) at Tungchwan, during an exploratory trip through China in 1909 as part of the Oriental Educational Investigation Commission.

One of the signs of the progressive spirit was a scheme for a Union University. Most of the missionaries had seen the importance of educational institutions, and had sought to provide schools and other facilities to meet the demand for Western learning. But since the adoption by China of Western methods of education, the demand for some institution for higher education had been greatly felt by those specially interested in the spiritual welfare of the educated classes. Then finally in 1910, the West China Union University was established in Chengtu. It was the fruit of a collective effort of four Protestant mission societies: American Baptist Foreign Mission Society (ABFMS, American Baptist Churches USA), American Methodist Episcopal Mission (AMEM, Methodist Episcopal Church), Canadian Methodist Mission (CMM, Methodist Church of Canada), and Friends' Foreign Mission Association (FFMA, British Quakers). The Church Missionary Society (CMS, Church of England) became a partner in the university in 1918. The university grew rapidly in its first decade and remained a key player in tertiary education in Sichuan throughout the Republican Era. The American Methodist missionary Joseph Beech, a Wesleyan University graduate and member of Psi Upsilon and Phi Beta Kappa, played an instrumental role in founding and running West China Union University. He served as its founding president and later its chancellor. David Crockett Graham, an American polymath Baptist minister, served as curator of the university's Museum of Art, Archaeology and Ethnology from 1932 to 1942. He also taught comparative religions at its Theological College, as well as archaeology and anthropology.

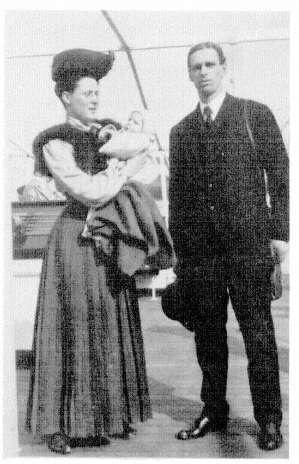
Robert Roy and Grace Service on shipboard, starting their trip to West China, 1905.

On 10 May 1906, an American missionary Robert Roy Service and his wife Grace Service arrived in Chengtu. With the help of an English Quaker missionary Henry Hodgkin, they opened up work for the first Young Men's Christian Association (YMCA) mission in the province. Robert and Grace were both graduates of the University of California, Berkeley. He was an athlete, member of Psi Upsilon and president of the senior class and of the YMCA. Grace was a member of Kappa Alpha Theta, and treasurer of the Young Women's Christian Association (YWCA). Through YMCA, an organization founded on the principles of muscular Christianity, Robert introduced Western physical education into the province. In 1910, fields for football and baseball, as well as a tennis court were constructed near the Wen Miao Street in Chengtu; a gymnasium was opened in 1913.

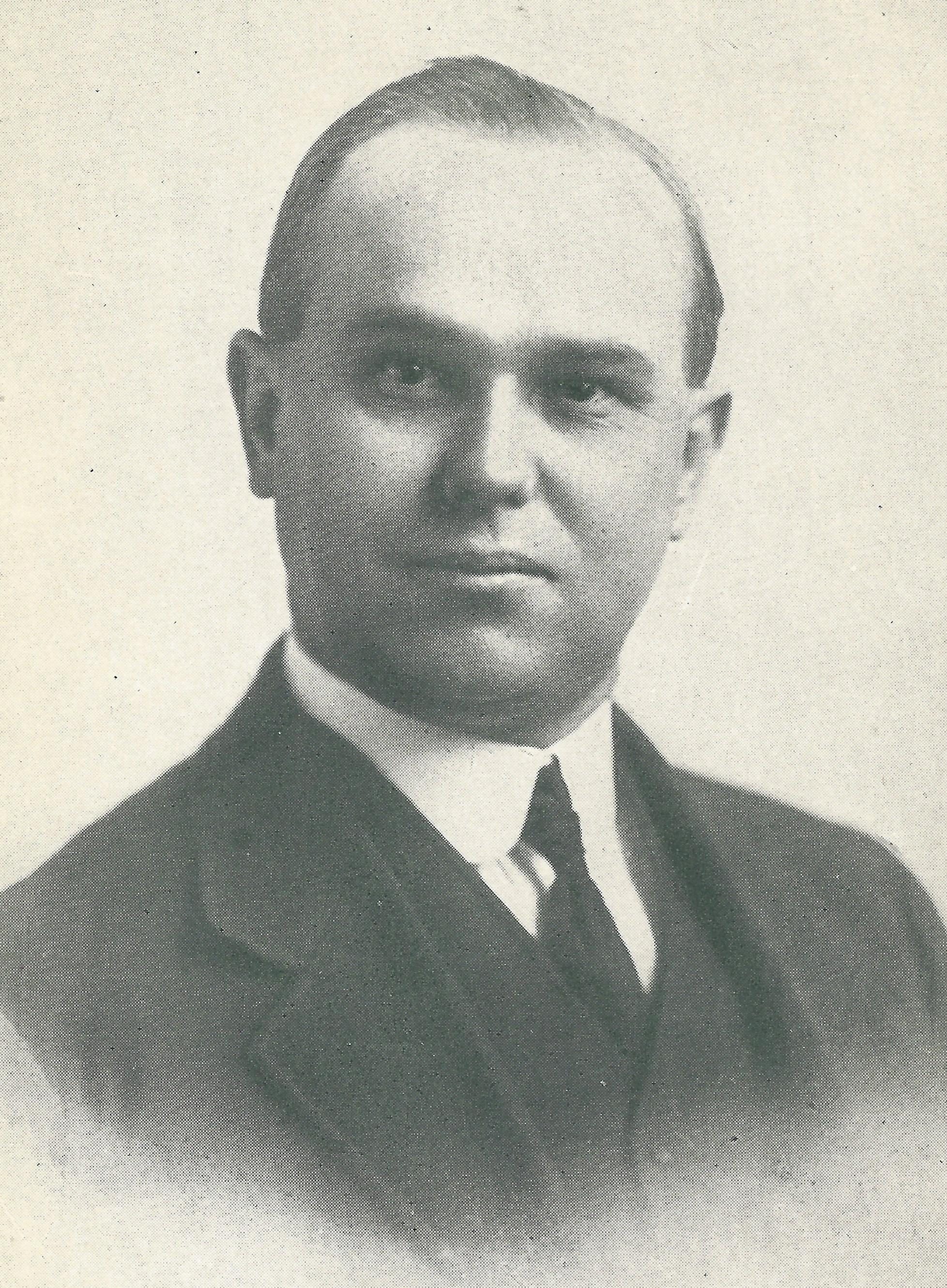
Albert Shelton

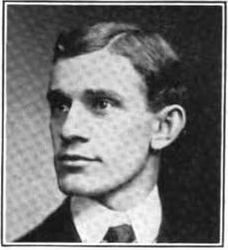
Zenas Sanford Loftis

Christian Church (Disciples of Christ) missionaries to Bathang, East Tibet

In 1908, Albert Shelton and James Clarence Ogden of the Foreign Christian Missionary Society of the Disciples of Christ arrived in Bathang after studying Chinese and Tibetan languages for four years in Tachienlu, where they established a mission station. Zenas Sanford Loftis joined the Bathang mission on 17 June 1909, but died from typhus fever and smallpox two months later. By 1922, Bathang became the centre of the Tibetan Christian Mission of the Disciples of Christ. Due to the constitution of Sichuan at the time, Bathang fell outside the western boundary and belonged to the special territory of Chwanpien, a mostly Tibetan-inhabited region.

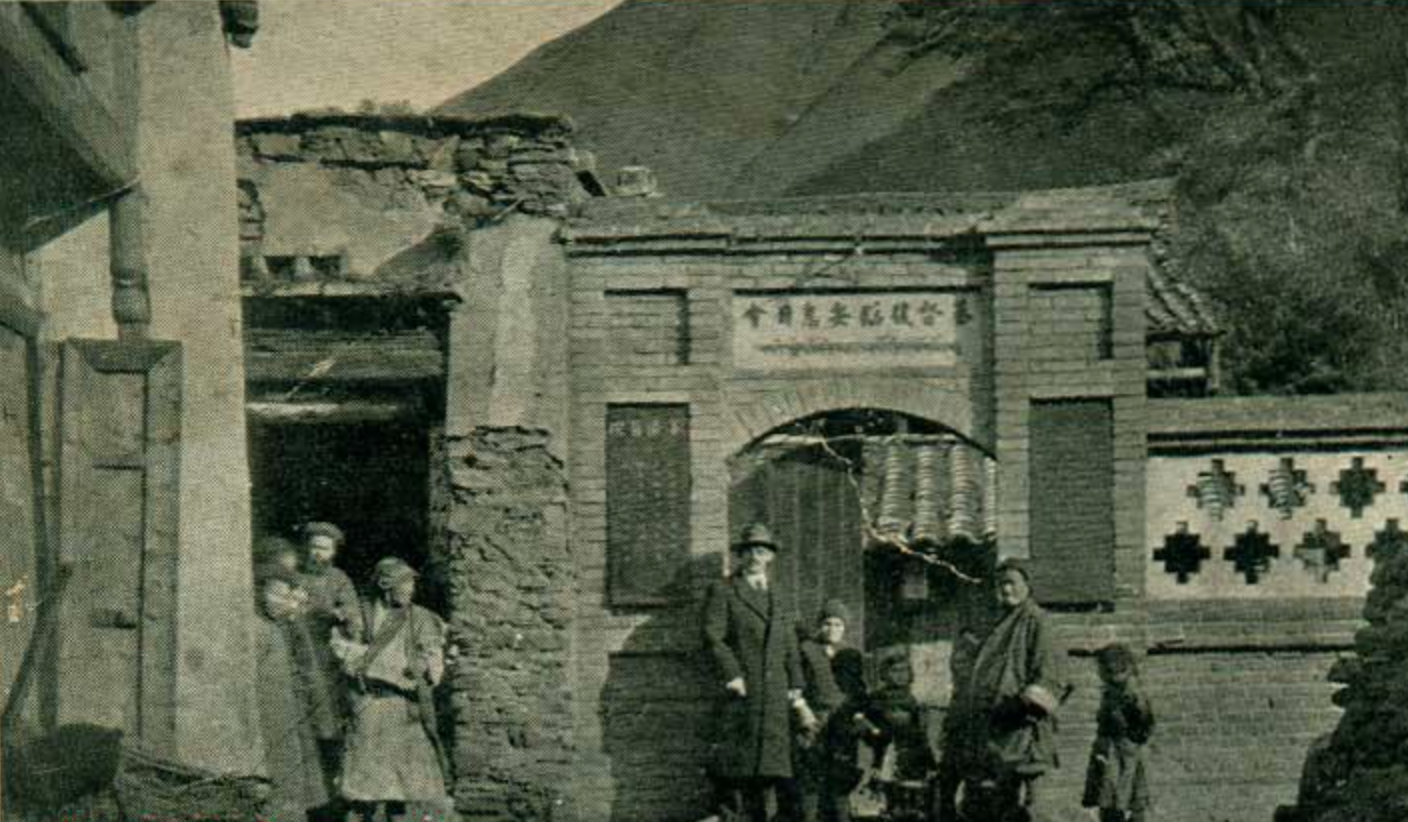
Dr. John Nevins Andrews with local converts standing outside the Adventist Church at Tatsienlu, East Tibet, c. 1931.

In 1914, the Adventist Mission of the Seventh-day Adventist Church established a mission station in Chungking. Their Szechwan Mission was officially formed in 1917. In 1919, the mission was divided into East Szechwan Mission and West Szechwan Mission for easier administration.

By the end of 1921, there were 12,954 baptized Protestant Christians in Sichuan, the Methodists enrolled almost one half of this number, namely 5,788. The Anglicans shared almost the other half with 5,474 church members. The American Baptists and English Quakers followed with 1,263 and 429 members respectively. 63 per cent of these 12,954 Protestants were men.

Lutheranism also had a small presence in Chungking. The Lutheran Holy Cross Church was founded in Wanhsien in 1925, under the supervision of George Oliver Lillegard, a pastor-missionary sent by the Lutheran Church – Missouri Synod.

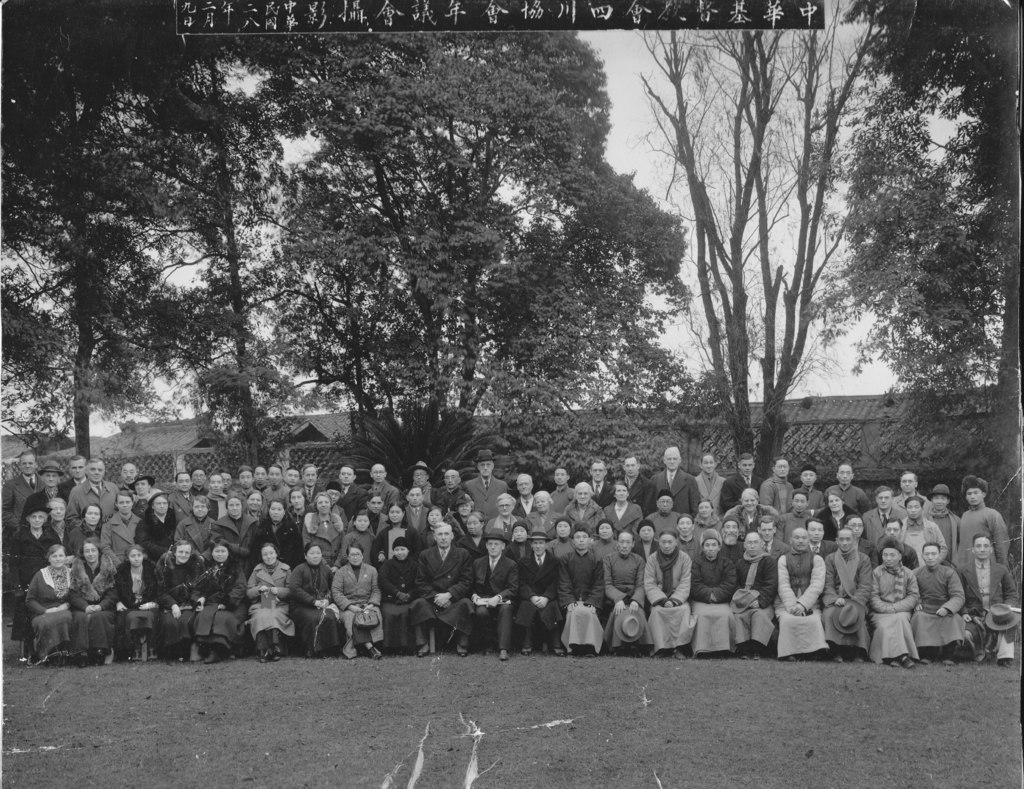
Annual meeting of the Szechwan Synod of the Church of Christ in China, held on 9 February 1939.

By 1934, the Canadian Methodist Mission had joined the Church of Christ in China (CCC); an annual general meeting of the CCC's Szechwan Synod was held on 9 February 1939. In 1940, the CCC established a mission station in Lifan, a county lies in the Sichuan-Khams Tibetan border region, as part of their Border Service Movement. This movement had a marked character of Social Gospel, with the aim of spreading Christianity to the Tibetan, Qiang and Yi peoples.

In 1935, the True Jesus Church established their first mission station in Chungking. Two years later, Kwang'an became their new mission centre where they baptized 186 people in one month.

In 1939, two American Mennonite missionaries, Henry Cornelius Bartel, founder of the China Mennonite Mission Society, and his wife Nellie Schmidt Bartel, travelled to Kwangyüan in northeastern Sichuan. In 1941 the Bartels started work in the Szechwan-Kansu-Shensi border. A mission centre was established at Sandui in early 1949, but all activities had ceased shortly before the Cultural Revolution launched in 1966.

The Kweichow-Szechwan Mission of the Christian and Missionary Alliance (C&MA) had its district on the borders of Kweichow and Szechwan Provinces and adjacent to Hunan and Hupeh Provinces. The C&MA missionary personnel were all withdrawn during the year 1949.

== Current situation ==
After the communist takeover of China in 1949, Protestant churches in China were forced to sever their ties with respective overseas Churches, which has thus led to the merging of all the denominations into communist-sanctioned Three-Self Patriotic Church.

In 1958, a "religious reformation" movement swept through Tibet. Churches in Bathang were desanctified and converted into communal canteens, along with demolitions of Buddhist temples and burning of sacred texts.

Radio Free Asia reported an arrest of eight Christians in 2010 during a gathering of a house church in Suining, while two were beaten. The police detained them for six hours and treated them as if they were criminals.

In 2018, Wang Yi, a well-known pastor from Chengdu, along with 100 Christians, were detained by authorities. Wang was reportedly arrested on allegations of "inciting subversion of state power". That same year, four Christian churches in Sichuan have been given an ultimatum and told they must join the Three-Self Church or be shut down.

In 2019, 200 congregants in Chengdu began to meet in secret after their state registered Three-Self church has been shut down.

On 17 November 2021, police raided the Qingcaodi Reformed Church in Deyang. Days later, one of the church members, Liu Wuyi, was detained criminally.

On 14 August 2022, police in Chengdu raided a Sunday gathering of the Early Rain Covenant Church (a congregation of the Reformed tradition founded by Wang Yi) and detained a leader.

=== Early Rain Covenant Church ===
Early Rain Covenant Church is one of the largest and most resilient house churches in Sichuan. The congregation was started as Early Rain Blessings Fellowship in April 2005 by Pastor Wang Yi and his wife Jiang Rong, in their own home in Chengdu, which was formally established as a house church in April 2008. It had been variously known as Early Rain Blessings Church, Early Rain Reformed Church and Early Rain Reformed Presbyterian Church before changing its name to Early Rain Covenant Church. As the church grew larger, several other house churches in Chengdu have joined Early Rain over time to form the Presbytery of West China Reformed Churches. This has led to other institutional extensions such as a kindergarten, a day school, a seminary (Western China Covenant Theological Seminary), and a liberal arts college (Western China Covenant College). In December 2019, Pastor Wang Yi was sentenced to nine years in prison for "inciting subversion of state power" and "illegal business activity".

== Impact ==
Journal of the West China Border Research Society, Volume I, 1922–1923

The West China Missionary News, established in 1899 by the West China Missions Advisory Board, was the first and longest-running English-language newspaper in Sichuan. Together with the Journal of the West China Border Research Society established in 1922, these two publications cover a wide range of topics including studies of local languages, customs, religion, economics, medicine, natural environment, and ethnic minorities, as well as translation of historical works concerning the Ba–Shu region.

The 1900 dictionary Western Mandarin, or the Spoken Language of Western China compiled by Adam Grainger, a British missionary of the China Inland Mission, has 803 pages, 3,786 characters, and 13,484 entries, as well as 401 proverbs. In 1917, Canadian Methodist missionary Omar Leslie Kilborn published his own Sichuanese-language textbook titled Chinese Lessons for First Year Students in West China.

Prior to 1950, the Protestant churches in Sichuan had a close relationship with Szechwan Lodge No. 112 under the jurisdiction of the Grand Lodge of the Philippines. In addition to having its meeting point at the West China Union University in Chengtu, several masters were also missionaries, e.g., American Baptist missionary David Crockett Graham; American Methodist missionary Ralph Ansel Ward; Canadian Methodist missionaries Albert James Brace and Thomas Harry Williams. Brace was one of the founders of the West China Border Research Society. Graham organized the first archaeological excavation of what is now known as Sanxingdui, which is supposedly the capital city of the ancient kingdom of Shu. He wrote "A Preliminary Report of the Hanchow Excavation" published in the Journal of the West China Border Research Society.

The work of Protestant missions had led to many firsts in Sichuan. The following table is based on the article "Outline of the History of Protestant Christianity in Sichuan" by Pastor Wang Yi.

First	Name	Location	Established by	Mission	Date
clinic	?	Chongqing (Chungking)	John McCarthy	China Inland Mission	1877
anti-footbinding movement	—N/a	Chongqing	Gertrude Howe	American Methodist Episcopal Mission	1880s
girls' school	Methodist Mission Girls School	Chongqing	Clara J. Collier	American Methodist Episcopal Mission	1887
middle school	Chungking Union High School	Chongqing	Spencer Lewis	American Methodist Episcopal Mission	1891
hospital	Chungking General Hospital	Chongqing	James H. McCartney	American Methodist Episcopal Mission	1892
children's hospital	Chengtu Hospital for Women & Children	Chengdu (Chengtu)	?	Canadian Methodist Mission	1896
girls' school in Chengdu	Chengtu Girls' School	Chengdu	Sara C. Brackbill	Canadian Methodist Mission	1896
publisher & printing house	Canadian Methodist Mission Press	Leshan (Kiating)	Virgil Chittenden Hart	Canadian Methodist Mission	1897
Protestant church in Tibet	Gospel Church, Kangding	Kangding (Tatsienlu)	Cecil Polhill et al.	China Inland Mission	1897
football pitch	football pitch at Friends High School	Chongqing	Alfred Davidson	Friends' Foreign Mission Association	1900
Protestant theological college	West China Diocesan College	Langzhong (Paoning)	W. H. Aldis	China Inland Mission	1902
kindergarten	Cecelia Kindergarten School	Yibin (Suifu)	Marianne Thirza Bisbee	American Baptist Missionary Union	1905
Christian university	West China Union University	Chengdu	Joseph Beech et al.	four missions	1910
gymnasium	Chengtu YMCA gymnasium	Chengdu	Robert Roy Service	YMCA mission	1913
dentistry education (in the entire country)	Department of Dentistry of the West China Union University	Chengdu	William Reginald Morse et al.	various missions	1917
school for the dumb and the blind	?	Mianyang (Mienchow)	Alfred Arthur Phillips	Church Missionary Society	1918
hospital in Tibet	Bathang Mission Hospital	Bathang	Albert Shelton	Foreign Christian Missionary Society	1919
school of midwifery	Chin I School of Midwifery	Chengdu	Marian Manly	Woman's Foreign Missionary Society of the Methodist Episcopal Church	1931
college revival	Christian Student Movement	Chengdu, Chongqing	—N/a	—N/a	1944
idea of setting up house churches in response to communist regime	Response Plan	Wanxian (Wanhsien)	—N/a	Missouri Synod Mission	1949

=== In popular culture ===
The 1936 novel Ripple on Stagnant Water by Li Chie-ren gives a detailed account of the conflicts among the three parties in the Chengdu area during the 1890s, namely, the local Christian communities, Elder Brothers Society and the bureaucracy. The novel was adapted into a 12-episode television series in 1988 titled A Woman to Three Men, a feature film in 1992 titled Ripples Across Stagnant Water, and a namesake series in 2008.

== Timeline ==
Mission	Church	Denomination	Country	Date
China Inland Mission	—N/a	Interdenominational	United Kingdom	1877
American Methodist Episcopal Mission	Methodist Episcopal Church	Methodist	United States	1882
London Missionary Society	Congregational church	Reformed	United Kingdom	1888
Friends' Foreign Mission Association	Britain Yearly Meeting	Quaker	United Kingdom	1889
American Baptist Foreign Mission Society	American Baptist Churches USA	Baptist	United States	1890
Church Missionary Society	Church of England	Anglican	United Kingdom	1891
Canadian Methodist Mission	Canadian Methodist Church	Methodist	Canada	1892
West China Religious Tract Society	—N/a	—N/a	Manchu China	1899
YMCA mission	YMCA of the USA	Nondenominational	United States	1906
Foreign Christian Missionary Society	Disciples of Christ	Restorationist	United States	before 1908
Szechwan Mission	Seventh-day Adventist Church	Adventist	United States	1914
Missouri Synod Mission Board	Lutheran Church – Missouri Synod	Lutheran	United States	1923
Branch Board of Szechwan	True Jesus Church	Nondenominational	Republican China	1935
West China Mennonite Brethren Mission	Mennonite Brethren Church	Mennonite	United States	1939
Szechwan Synod	Church of Christ in China	Interdenominational	Republican China	1939?
Kweichow-Szechwan Mission	Christian and Missionary Alliance	Evangelical	United States	?
Swedish Holiness Mission	Swedish Holiness Union	Baptist/evangelical	Sweden	?
American Bible Society	—N/a	—N/a	United States	?
British and Foreign Bible Society	—N/a	—N/a	United Kingdom	?
National Bible Society of Scotland	—N/a	—N/a	United Kingdom	?

== Maps ==
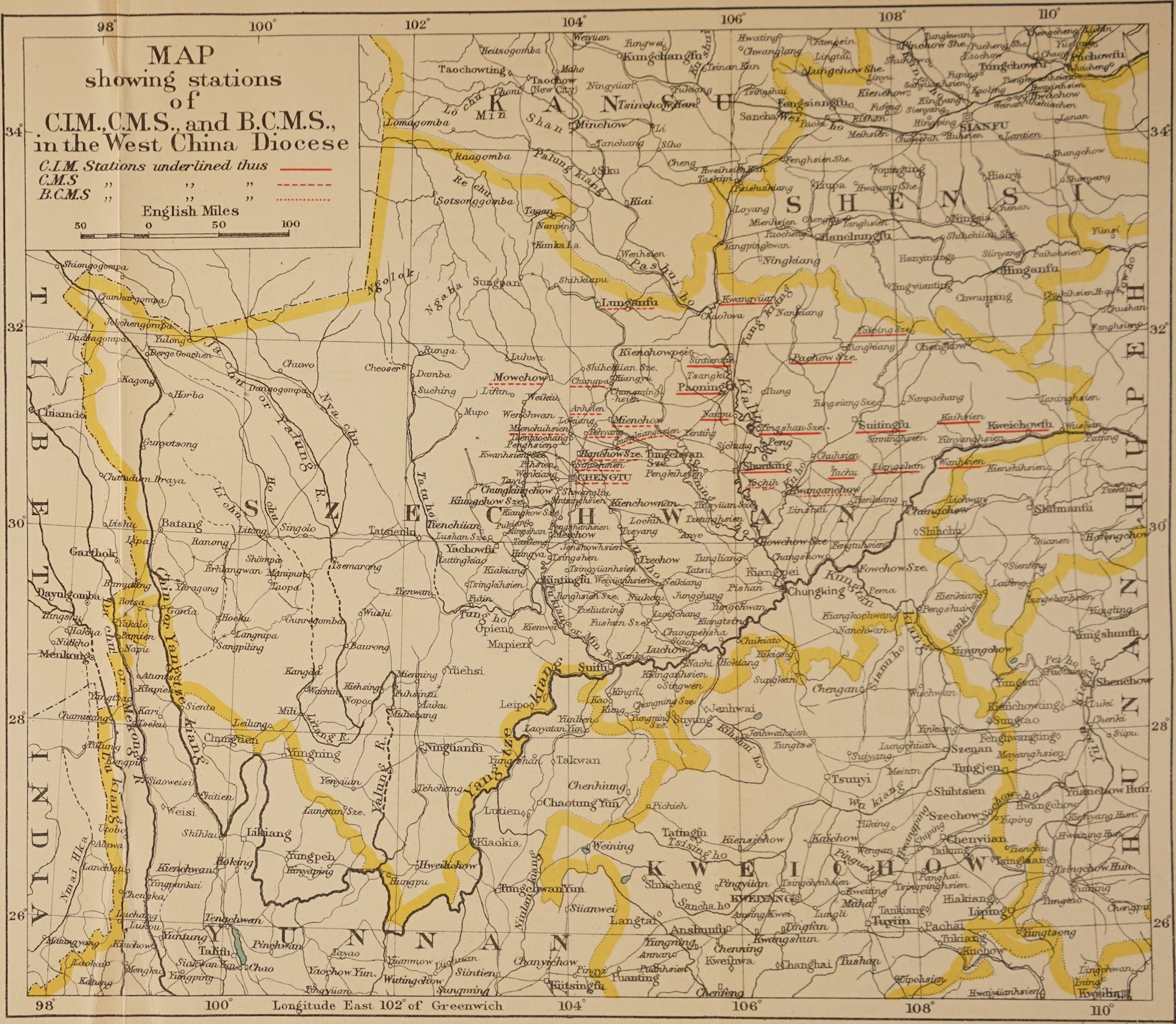
Map of Szechwan showing Anglican mission stations of China Inland Mission (CIM), Church Missionary Society (CMS) and Bible Churchmen's Missionary Society (BCMS)

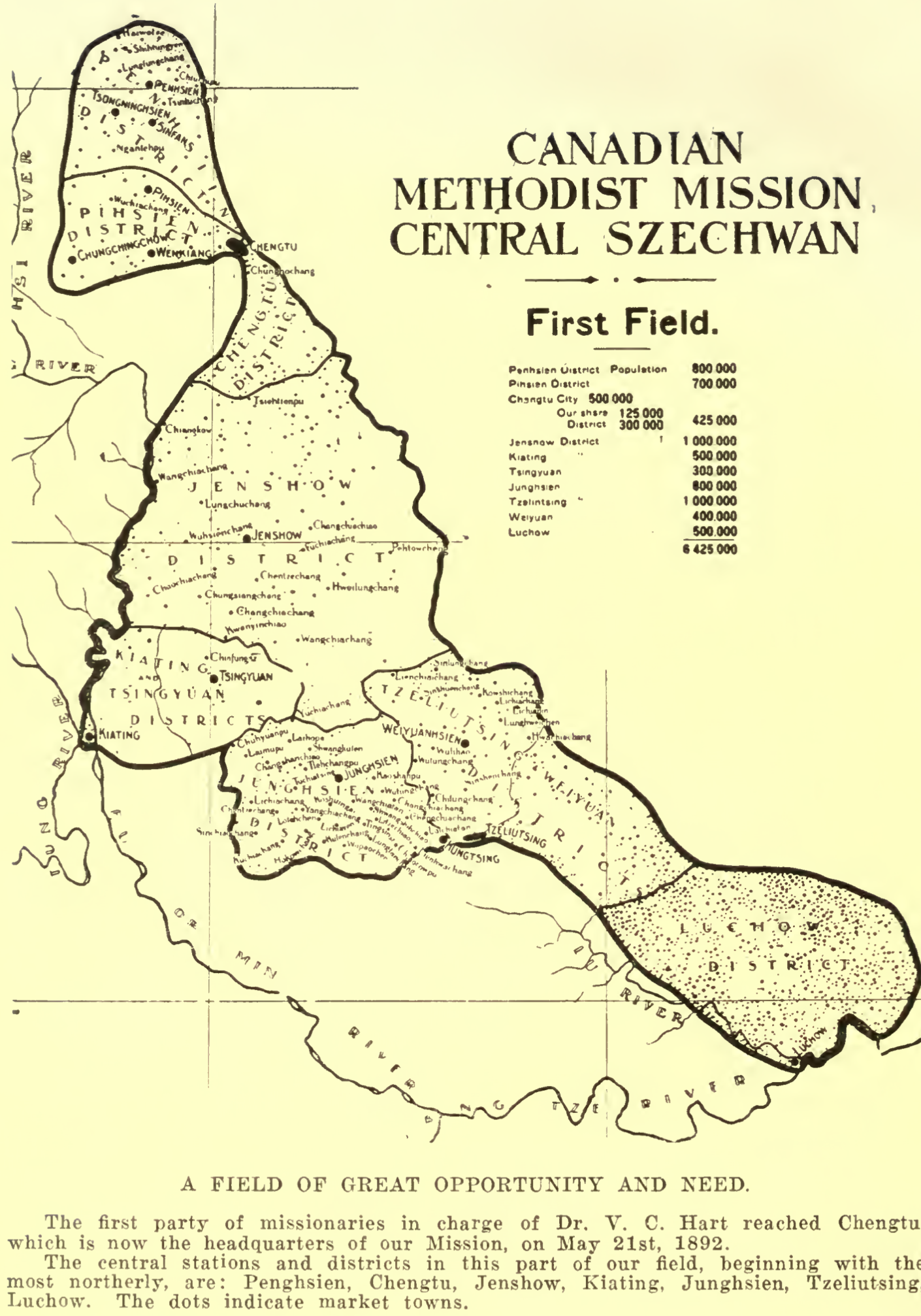
Canadian Methodist Mission in Central Szechwan

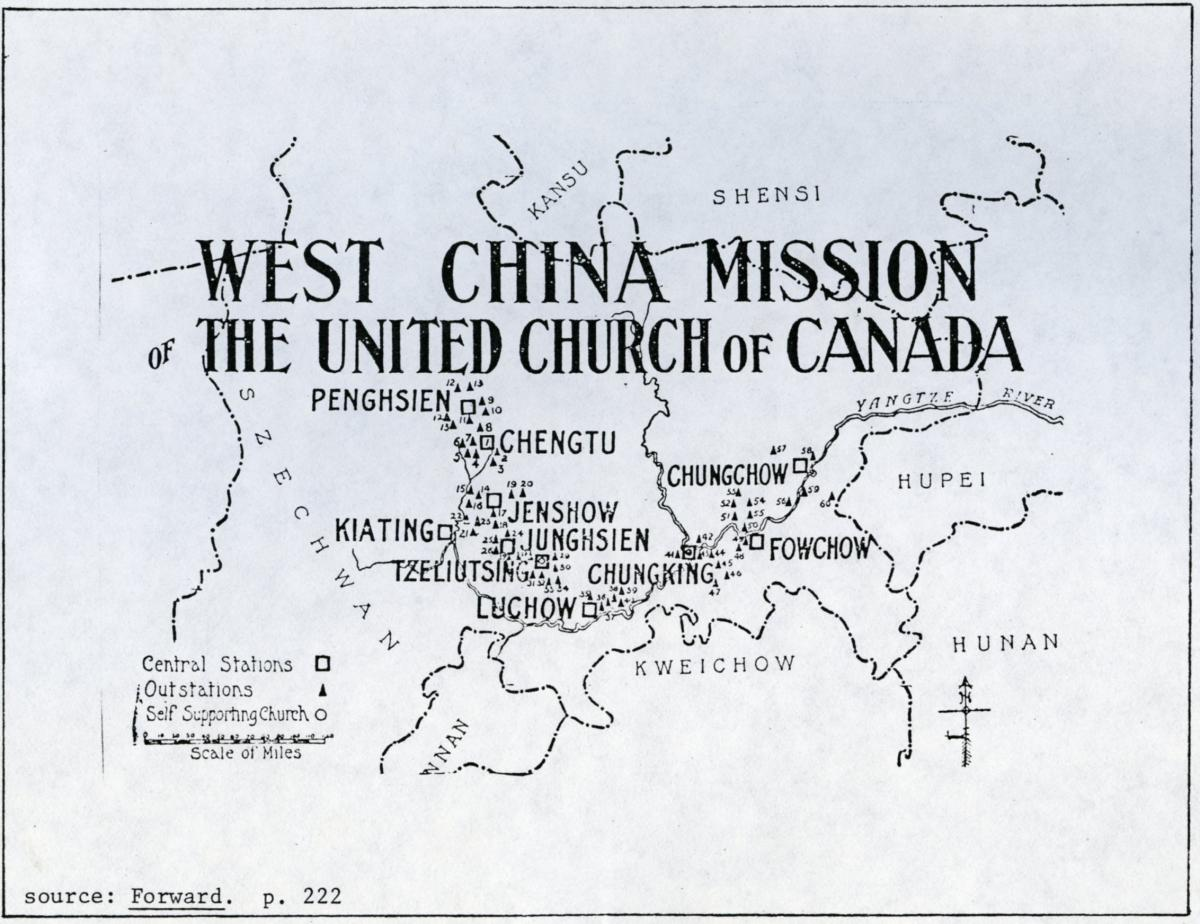
West China Mission of the United Church of Canada (Methodist)

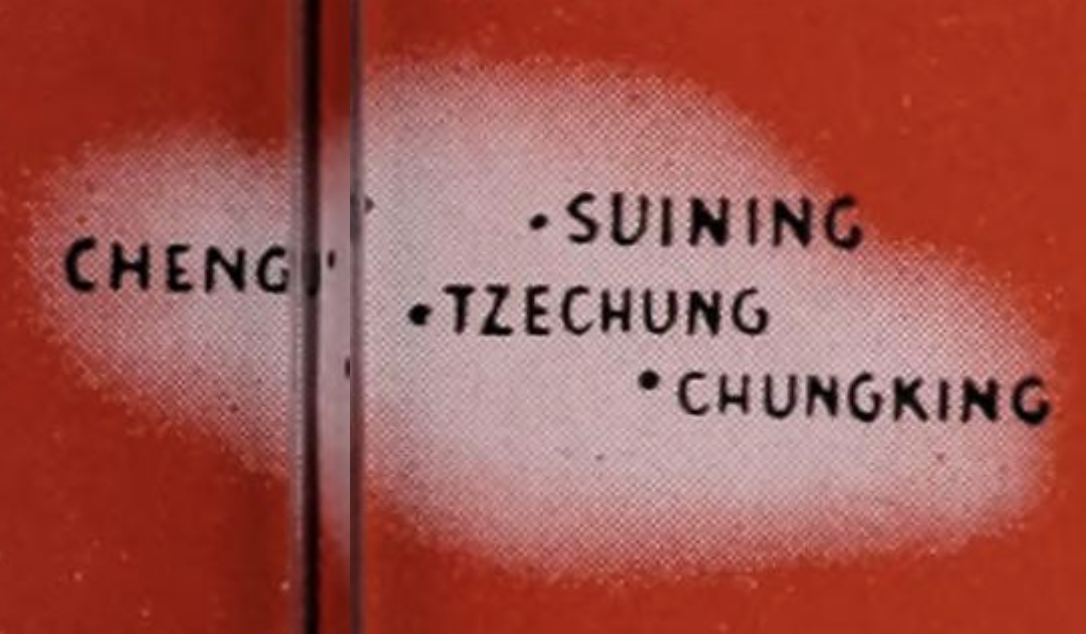
American Methodist Episcopal Mission area in Szechwan

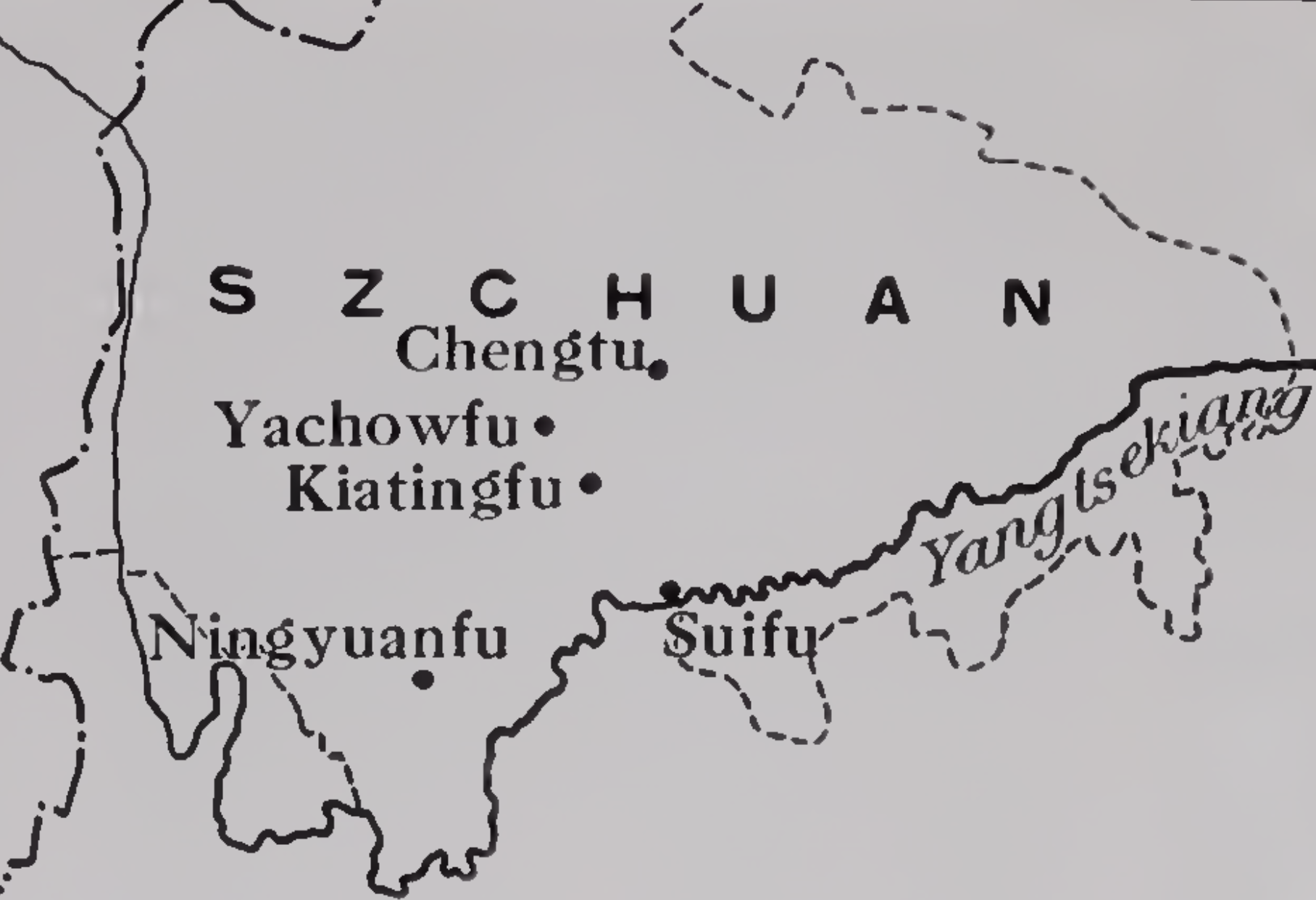
Map of Szechwan showing American Baptist Mission stations

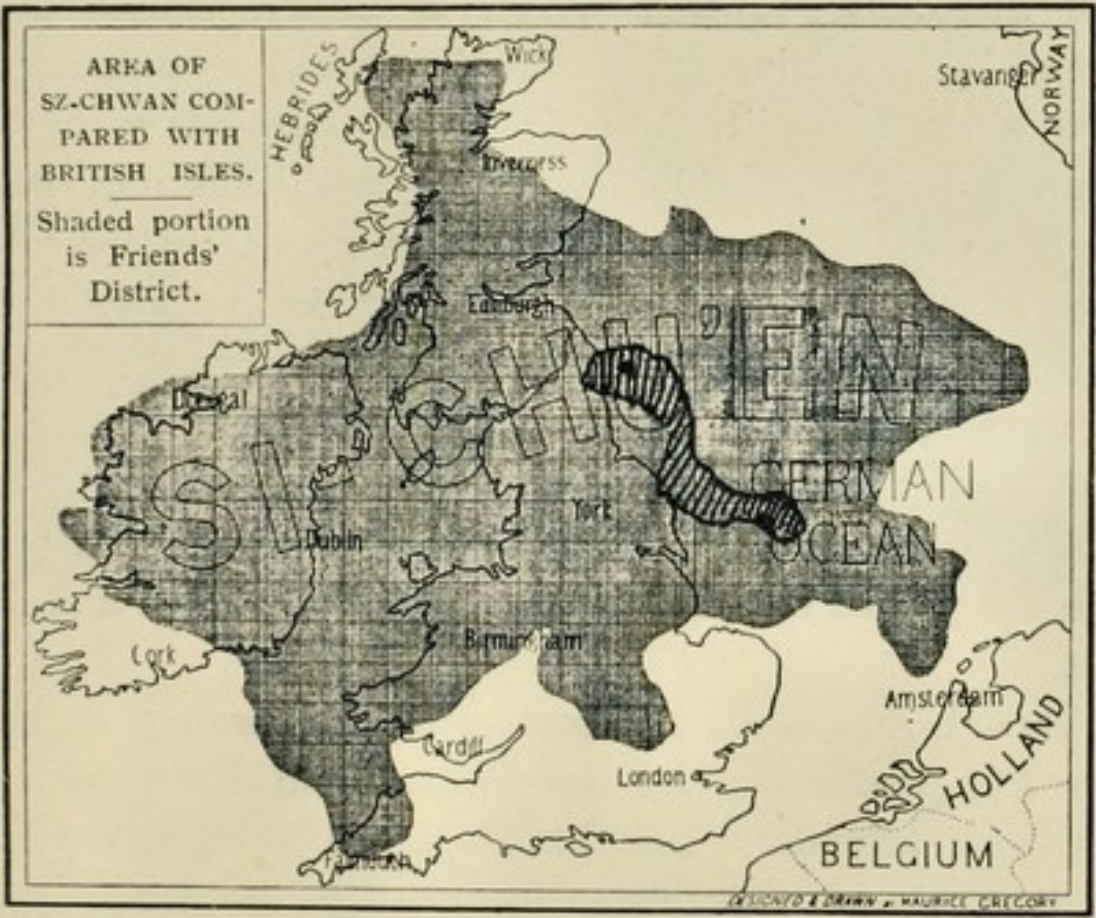
Area of Szechwan compared with British Isles. Shaded portion is Friends' Foreign Mission Association's district.

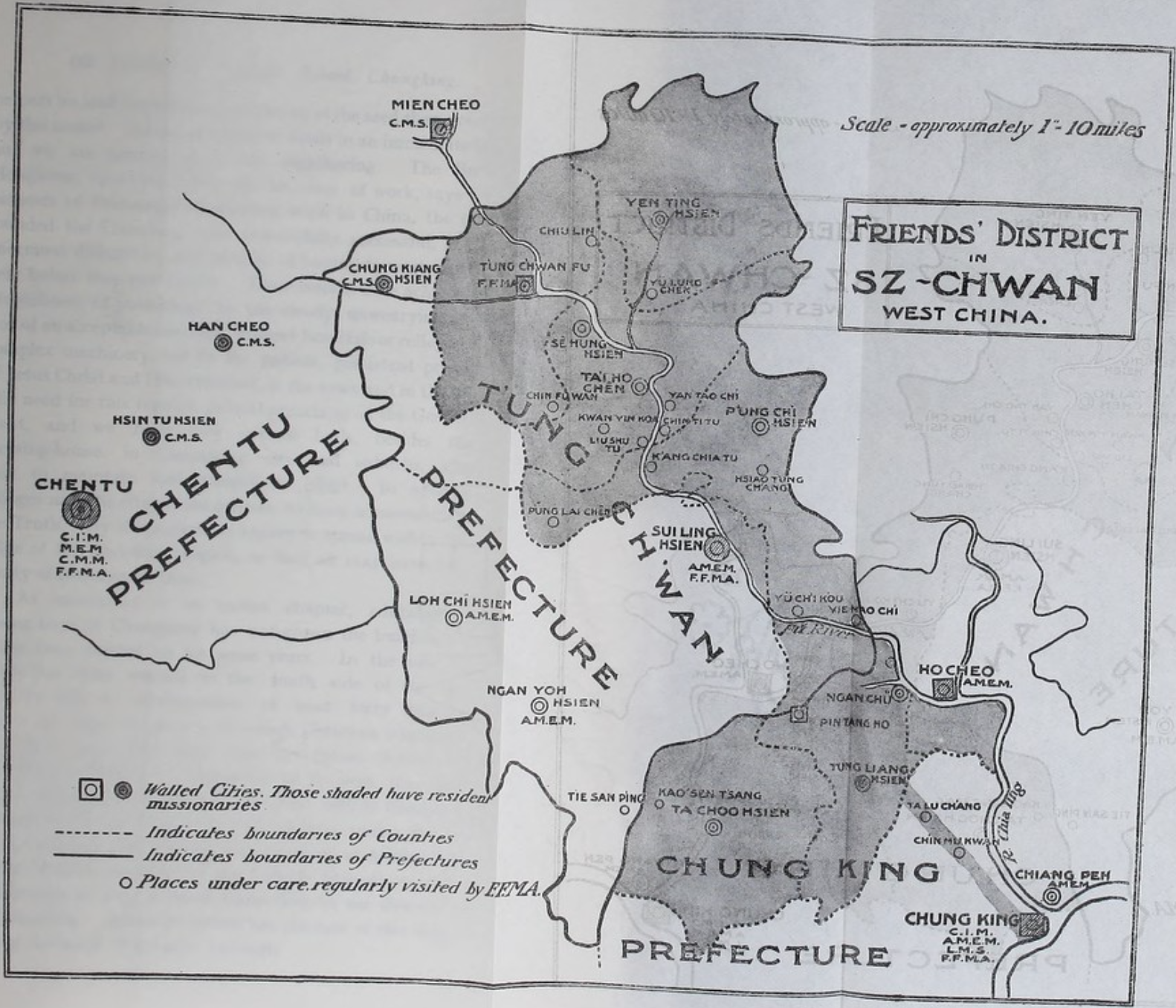
Friends' Foreign Mission Association's district in Szechwan (Quaker)

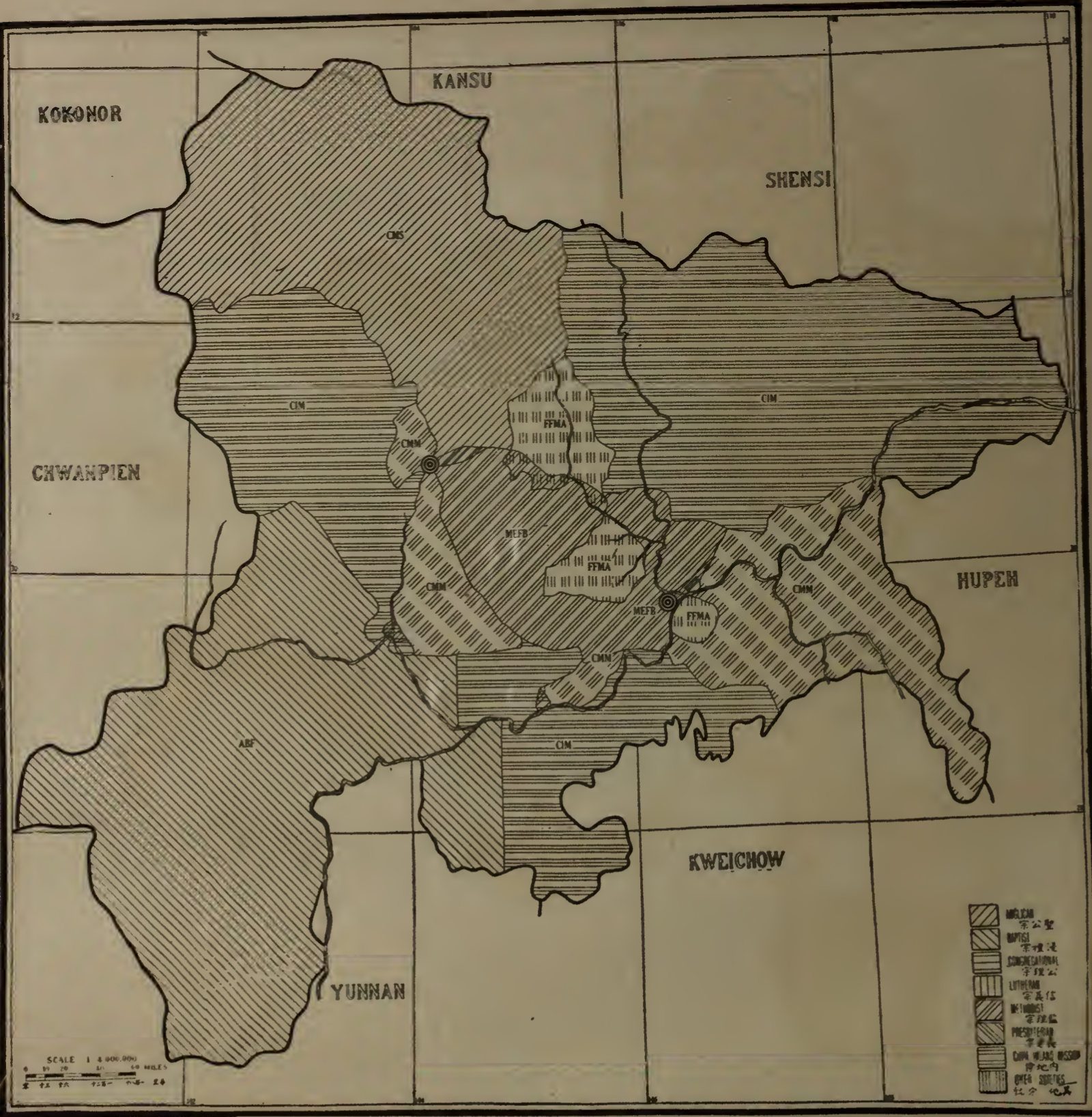
Map of Szechwan showing division of the field by six Protestant mission societies in 1922: ABF, CIM, CMM, CMS, FFMA, and MEFB.

== See also ==
- Christianity in Sichuan
  - Church of the East in Sichuan
  - Catholic Church in Sichuan
  - Protestantism in Mianyang
- Anti-Christian Movement (China)
- Anti-missionary riots in China
- Antireligious campaigns of the Chinese Communist Party
- Denunciation Movement
- House church (China)
- Category:Anglicanism in Sichuan
- Category:Methodism in Sichuan
- Category:Quakerism in Sichuan
- Category:Baptist Christianity in Sichuan
- Category:Sichuanese Protestants
- Category:Protestant churches in Chongqing
- Category:Protestant churches in Sichuan
- Category:Protestant missionaries in Sichuan
- Category:Protestant missionaries in Tibet
