= Catholic Church of Lhasa =

Coordinates: 29.6500°N 91.1000°E

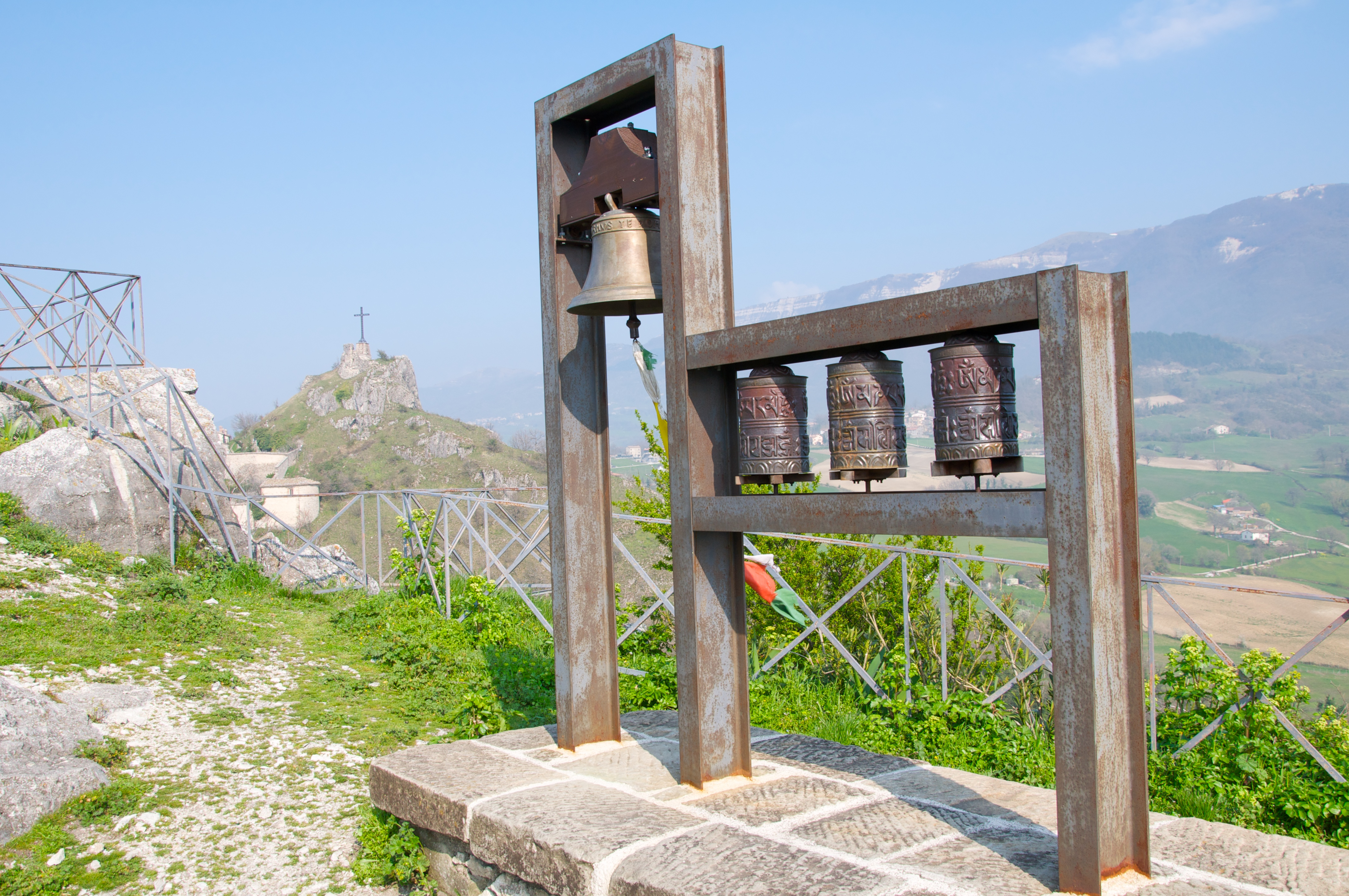
- Lhasa bell in Pennabilli, Italy, redesign of the original bell of the Catholic mission in Lhasa
- Catholic Church of Lhasa
- Location: Lhasa, Tibet
- Country: China
- Denomination: Roman Catholic

The Catholic Church of Lhasa, also called the Lhasa Chapel, was the first Catholic church in Tibet in China. It was founded in 1726 and disappeared in 1745.

== History ==
Three Capuchin missionaries arrived at Lhasa in 1708 and were later joined by another two missionaries the next year. The missionaries spent the next few years studying the Tibetan language and providing medical services to the locals. However, in 1712 they returned back to Europe as they were suffering from illness, a lack of funds and faced hostility from the Gelugpa order.

Italian Capuchin priests Francesco della Penna and Domenico da Fano arrived in Lhasa in 1719 with some Capuchin friars. This was followed by a contest of competition with the Jesuit missionary Ippolito Desideri, the Holy See decided in 1721 in favor of the Capuchins who had already obtained the authorization of the Tibetan authorities to build a chapel.

Kelzang Gyatso, the seventh Dalai Lama, authorized the construction of the church on the heights of the city in 1726.

The superior of the mission, Francesco della Penna, returned to Rome in 1737, when Pope Benedict XIV gave a letter to the seventh Dalai Lama, and he took the road to Tibet.

The mission soon began making converts which was met with hostility from the Gelugpa Lamas. Hundreds of Lamas appealed to the Lhasa government to banish the European missionaries. The appeal was successful and all missionaries were forced to leave Lhasa by 1745. The church was subsequently destroyed.

The mission had little success converting any Tibetans and most converts were foreign Nepalis, Kasmiris and Han Chinese who resided in Lhasa. However, the mission had up to 26 Tibetan converts near the end of its existence.

== See also ==
- Catholic Church in Tibet
- History of European exploration in Tibet
- Our Lady of the Sacred Heart Church, Yerkalo
