= Our Lady of the Sacred Heart Church, Yerkalo =

Coordinates: 29.0432°N 98.6105°E

- Catholic Church of Yerkalo
- 鹽井聖心聖母堂
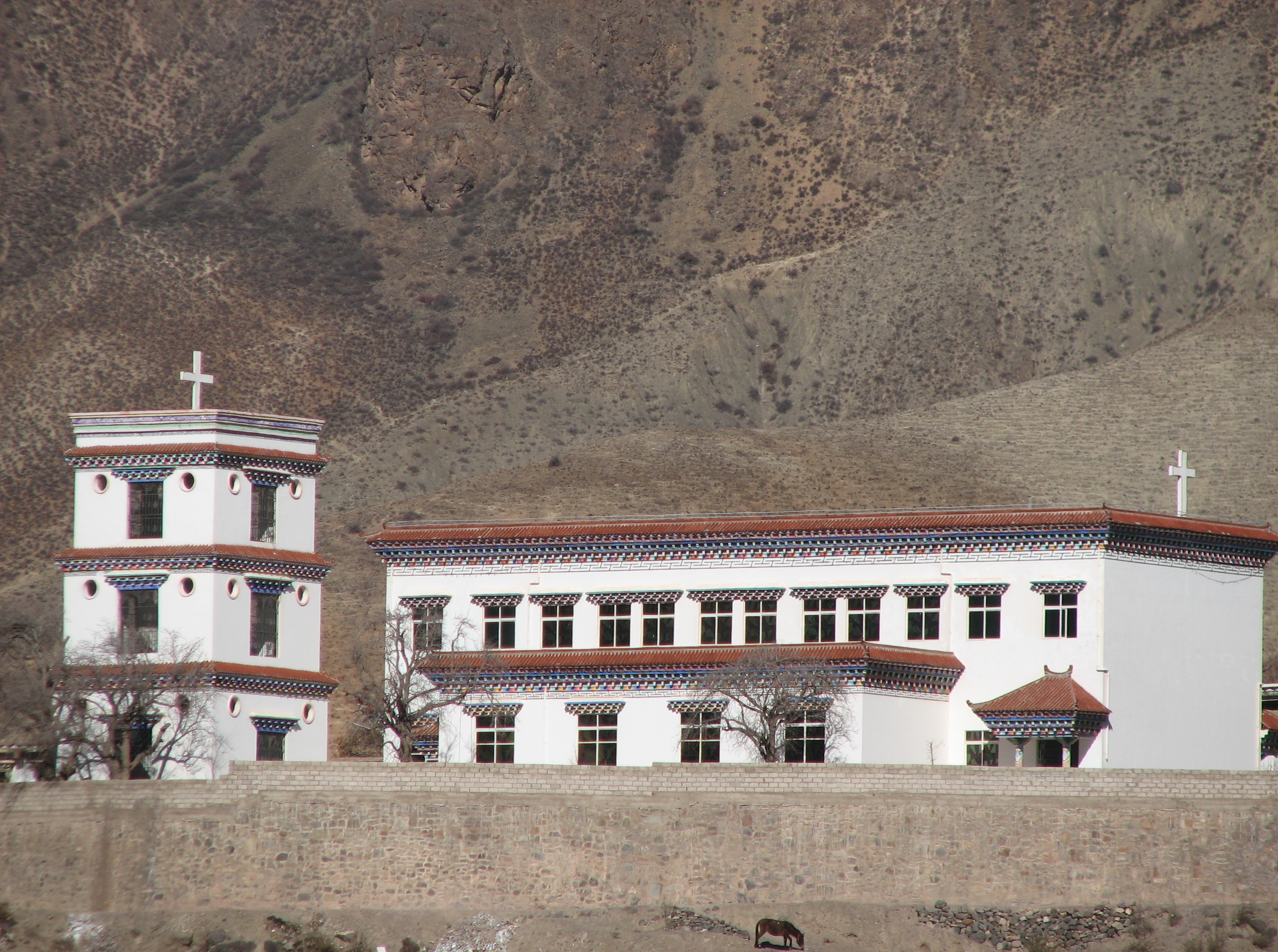
- Our Lady of the Sacred Heart Church, Yerkalo
- Location: Yerkalo, Chamdo, Tibet
- Country: China
- Denomination: Catholic Church

History
- Status: Church
- Founded: 1865
- Founder(s): Félix Biet; Auguste Desgodins
- Dedication: Our Lady of the Sacred Heart

Architecture
- Functional status: Active
- Style: Tibetan

Administration
- Archdiocese: Chongqing
- Diocese: Kangding

Our Lady of the Sacred Heart Church, (Note: traditional Chinese: 聖心聖母堂; simplified Chinese: 圣心圣母堂; pinyin: Shèngxīn shèngmǔ táng.) commonly referred to as Catholic Church of Yerkalo or Yanjing Catholic Church, (Note: 鹽井天主敎堂; 盐井天主教堂; Yánjǐng tiānzhǔ jiàotáng.) is a Catholic church located in Yerkalo (Tibetan: ཚ་ཁ་ལྷོ, Wylie: tsha kha lho, THL: Tsakalo, lit. 'salt pit'), a village between 2650 and 3109 meters above sea level at the southern end of Markham County (Chamdo, Tibet Autonomous Region) in present-day China.

== History ==
It was founded as a chapel in 1865 by Félix Biet and Auguste Desgodins, French missionaries of the Paris Foreign Missions Society, and dedicated to Our Lady of the Sacred Heart, patroness of the parish of Yerkalo.

The church is referenced in Adrien Launay's Histoire de la Mission du Thibet as Chapelle de Notre-Dame du Sacré-Cœur. The mission of Yerkalo was based in Xinjiang but some of its missionaries opted to proselytize in Tibet. Within a few years, Tibetan marauders supported by Buddhist lamas killed 10 priests and destroyed all but one Catholic mission which was based in Yerkalo.

In 1939, the parish of Yerkalo received devotional statues of Our Lady of the Sacred Heart and of Saint Thérèse of the Child Jesus.

According to the Xinhua news agency, the establishment of a small Catholic parish in Tibet was not an easy task. Enmity from the local Tibetan Buddhist monks from the Karma Gon Monastery culminated in the killing of one of Father Biet's successors, Maurice Tornay in August 11, 1949.

== Architecture ==
The exterior of the church features traditional Tibetan design while the interior has European Gothic designs. The church holds weekly services in the Tibetan language. As of 2014, the church had one priest, two sisters and serves an estimated 559 worshippers around the area.

== See also ==
- Catholic Church in Tibet
- Catholic Church in Sichuan
- Catholic Church of Lhasa
- Sacred Heart Church, Zhongding
- History of European exploration in Tibet

== Bibliography ==
- Launay, Adrien (1903). Histoire de la Mission du Thibet, tome deuxième (in French). Paris: Desclée, de Brouwer et cie.
