= History of European exploration in Tibet =

The location of Tibet, deep in the Himalaya mountains, made travel to Tibet extraordinarily difficult at any time, in addition to the fact that it traditionally was forbidden to all western foreigners. The internal and external politics of Tibet, China, Bhutan, Assam, and the northern Indian kingdoms combined rendered entry into Tibet politically difficult for all Europeans. The combination of inaccessibility and political sensitivity made Tibet a mystery and a challenge for Europeans well into the 20th century.

== History ==
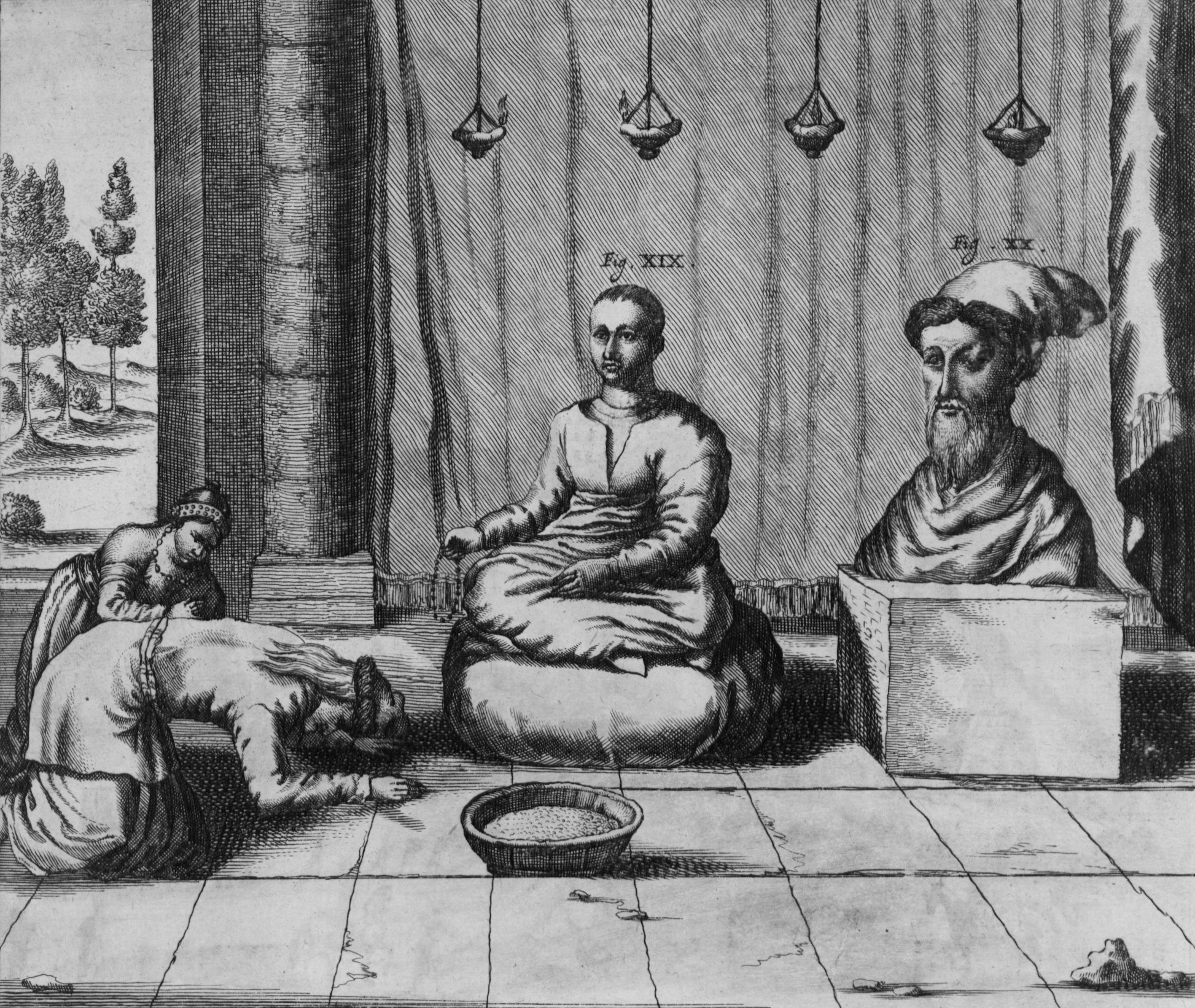
1667 illustration

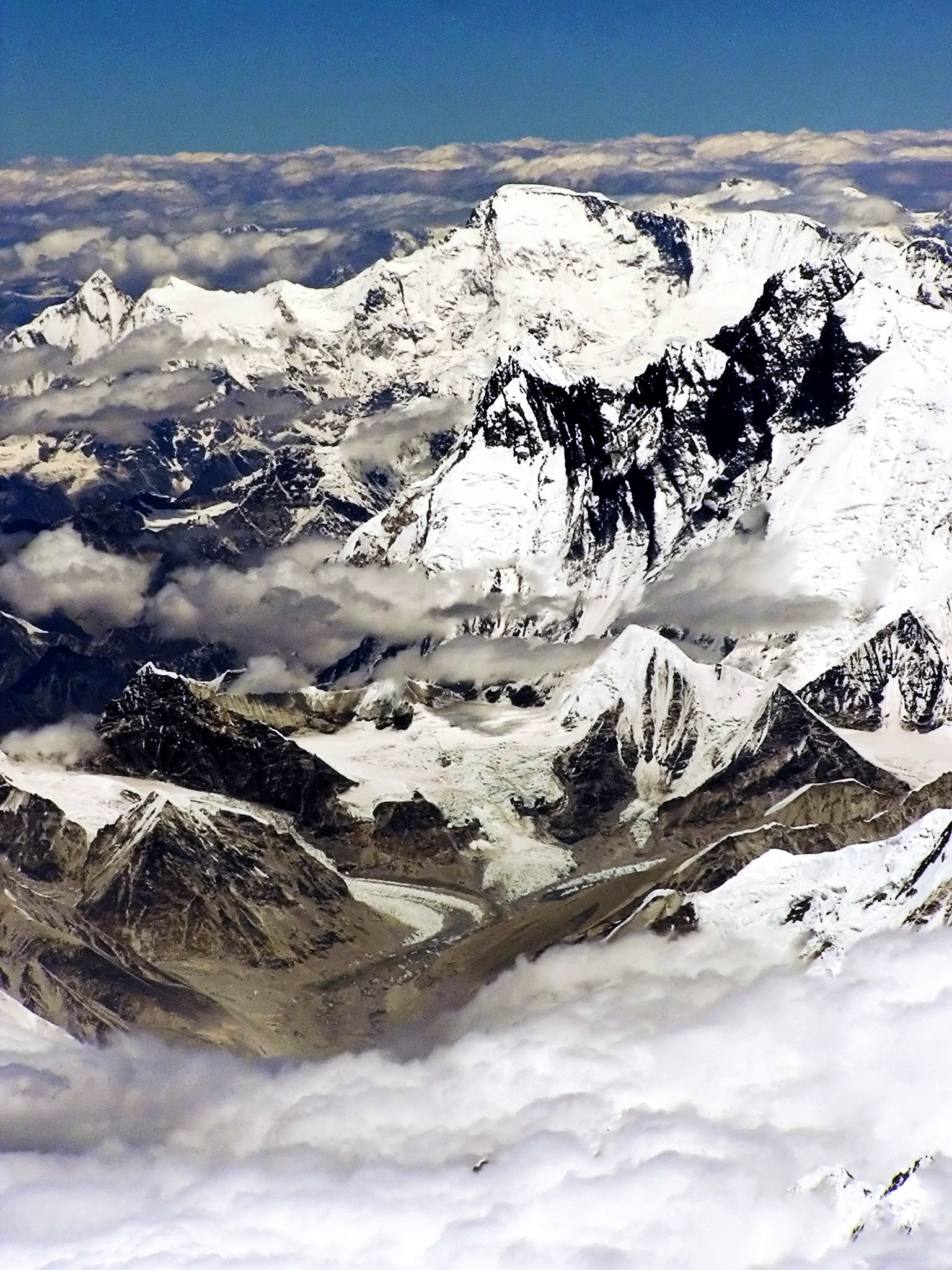
Himalayas, on the southern rim of the Tibetan plateau.

=== 12th–16th centuries ===
The earliest European reports of Tibet were from Benjamin of Tudela who left Zaragoza, Aragon in 1160 and travelled to Baghdad before returning to Navarre in 1173. Based on his discussions with learned men, Rabbi Benjamin describes Tibet as being the land of musk and as being four days journey from Samarkand.

Less than 100 years later, an emissary was sent by Louis IX to the Mangu Khan in Karakorum in 1253. Friar William of Rubruck reported that the Tibetan people ‘were held an abomination among all nations’ due a ritual of drinking from the skulls of their parents. Friar William was also the first to describe a Tibetan lama's garments in detail.

The first documented European claim to have visited Tibet came from Odoric of Pordenone, a Franciscan who claimed to have traveled through Tibet in about 1325. Odoric's record was later plagiarized and popularized by John de Mandeville.

By 1459 the general location of Tibet was clearly known as Thebet appears on the Fra Mauro map in close proximity to its correct location.

=== 17th century ===
The first documented Europeans to arrive in Tibet were a pair of Portuguese Jesuit missionaries, António de Andrade and Manuel Marques in July or August, 1624. Andrade and Marques' eight-month journey began in Agra, where they joined the procession of the Emperor Jehangir and proceeded to Delhi under the protection of the Emperor. In Delhi, Andrade and Marques disguised themselves as Hindu pilgrims and joined a caravan bound for the Hindu shrine of Badrinath. The caravan followed the Ganges River to Srinagar and Garhwal where they were discovered. The Raj of Garhwal detained and interrogated both men for a week before allowing Andrade and Marques to proceed. Andrade and Marques rejoined the caravan and reached Badrinath, probably in early June 1624. In Badrinath, they left the caravan and proceeded to Mana, the last town before the Mana Pass and the border of Tibet. Andrade and Marques made one failed attempt on the Mana Pass which was blocked by heavy snow, only to realize that the agents of the Raj of Garhwal were in hot pursuit. Marques remained in Mana to deflect the pursuit and rejoined Andrade and a group of Tibetans for a second successful assault on Mana Pass in either July or August 1624. The two were welcomed warmly by the King and Queen of Guge, becoming the first documented Europeans to enter Tibet. Staying in Tibet for only a month, Andrade and Marques would return to Agra by November 1624 to organize a mission trip for the following year. In 1625 with the full support of the King and Queen of Guge, Andrade and Marques established a permanent mission at Tsaparang.

On the advice of Andrade, a mission was dispatched to southern Tibet from India in 1627. The Portuguese missionaries João Cabral and Estêvão Cacella were welcomed at Shigatse by the King of Utsang. Cabral and Cacella established a mission at Shigatse in 1628.

Cabral and Cacella also provided the first information that reached western civilization about the mystical country of Shambhala (which they transcribed as "Xembala") in their reports to India.

Both missions were evacuated in 1635 as the missions became embroiled in the rivalry between the Red Hat Sect and the Yellow Hat Sect. It would be twenty-five years before the next documented Europeans visited Tibet.

In 1661, two Jesuits, Johannes Grueber of Austria and Albert Dorville (D’Orville) traveled from Peking to Agra, India by way of Lhasa on an Imperial Passport.

=== 18th century ===
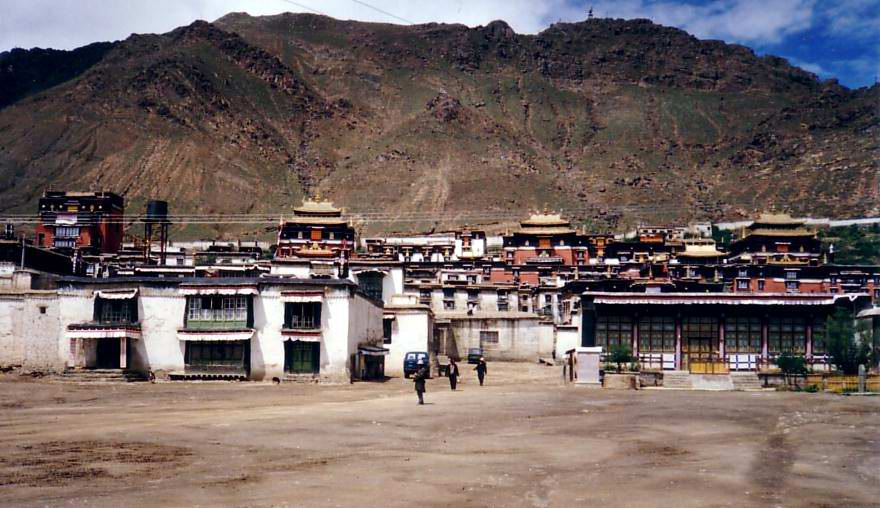
George Bogle was welcomed by the Panchen Lama at Tashilhunpo in Shigatse

The most important of these missionaries was Ippolito Desideri, an Italian Jesuit who left Rome in 1712 with the blessing of Pope Clement XI and arrived in Lhasa on 18 March 1716. Desideri's various journeys between 1716 and 1721, when he was withdrawn by Rome, encompassed a circuit of the Tibetan borders with Nepal, modern Kashmir and Pakistan. The Capuchins became the sole Christian missionaries in Tibet for the next twenty-five years. The Capuchins met increased opposition from Tibetan lamas before finally being expelled from Tibet in 1745.

=== 19th century ===
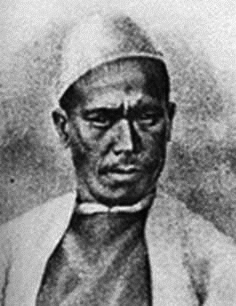
Nain Singh

In 1865, in 1867 and in 1873-1875 Nain Singh, a pudit employed by the British, conducted a secret survey of Tibet.

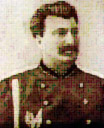
Nicholas Przewalski

In 1879–80, Russian explorer Nicholas Przewalski travelled in northern Tibet.

In 1885–1887 Arthur Douglas Carey and Andrew Dalgleish travelled in northern Tibet.

In 1889, Gabriel Bonvalot with Prince Henri of Orléans and Father Constant de Deken crossed the mountain range of Tibet.

In 1893–94, Jules-Léon Dutreuil de Rhins with Fernand Grenard explored most inaccessible and least-known regions of northern and western Tibet. The Swedish explorer Sven Hedin conducted 1893–1897, 1905-1909 and 1927-35 three expeditions which mapped big parts of Tibet. Hedin had a doctorate in geography and was a skilled cartoonist and writer who together with other participants in these expeditions carefully documented what they saw in Tibet from many different aspects during these expeditions. Hedin and his followers made surprisingly accurate and detailed maps of large parts of Tibet compiled extensive documentation of their observations. Hedins books and lectures about his expeditions made him a world-famous person in the years before the First World War.

In 1898, a Canadian missionary medical doctor, Susie Rijnhart, and her husband and baby attempted to reach Lhasa from the north. The couple came to within one hundred miles of Lhasa before being turned back. The baby died and the husband disappeared, but Dr. Rijnhart survived and made her way alone out of Tibet.

British experience in Tibet (particularly the instructions by Sarat Chandra Das) was used by the first known Japanese explorer of Tibet, Zen monk Ekai Kawaguchi, who crossed into Tibet in 1899 disguised as a Chinese monk, reached Lhasa and stayed for long enough to serve the Dalai Lama as a therapist.

Russian explorers reached Lhasa several months later - Gombojab Tsybikov in August 1900, and Ovshe Norzunov in February 1901, officially as Mongolian pilgrims. They had the advantage of using Nain Singh's publications, Lhasa pilgrimage experiences of their native Buryat and Kalmyk kinsmen, and support of Russian-born associate of the Dalai Lama, Agvan Dorzhiev. Tsybikov and Norzunov became the first photographers of Lhasa known by name, and the earliest published photographers of the city. For Norzunov, a Kalmyk nobleman and devout Buddhist, it was his second visit to Lhasa, but his earlier trip, taken in 1898–1899, was not supported by Russia or have exploration on agenda.

At that very time, Przewalski's student Pyotr Kozlov headed to Tibet and explored the Chinese-controlled part of Kham, but was stopped at the border of Tibetan-controlled territory in October 1900 and had to retreat.

=== 20th century ===
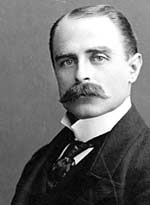
Francis Younghusband

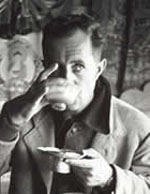
Tucci drinking butter tea in Tibet

In 1913 British explorers Frederick Bailey and Henry Morshead had carried out an unauthorised exploration of Tsangpo Gorge and later Tibet officially agreed to the 1921 British Mount Everest reconnaissance expedition and the 1935 reconnaissance expedition although they both carried out exploration well beyond the terms of their permits.

In 1938-1939 from May 1938 to August 1939, a German scientific expedition led by German zoologist and SS officer Ernst Schäfer was carried out. Member of this expedition was also Bruno Beger, a racial anthropologist, ethnologist, and explorer.

In 2009, 5.6 million tourists visited Tibet Autonomous Region and spent ¥5.6 billion. Both were 150% increases from 2008.

== See also ==
- Catholic Church in Tibet

== Bibliography ==
- Bernbaum, Edwin: The Way to Shambhala, Reprint: (1989). Jeremy P. Tarcher, Inc., Los Angeles. ISBN 0-87477-518-3
- Das, Sarat Chandra. Journey to Lhasa and Central Tibet, Edited by: Rockhill, William Woodville, (2001), PalJor Publications, New Delhi, ISBN 81-86230-17-3
- De Filippi, Flippo (Editor). An Account of Tibet, The Travels of Ippolito Desideri, Routledge & Sons, Ltd, London, 1931
- Foster, Barbara & Michael. Forbidden Journey: The Life of Alexandra David-Neel, (1987) Harper & Row, New York, ISBN 0-06-250345-6
- Garzilli, Enrica, L'esploratore del Duce: Le avventure di Giuseppe Tucci e la politica italiana in Oriente da Mussolini a Andreotti. Con il carteggio di Giulio Andreotti, 2 vols., Milano: Asiatica Association, 2014 (3rd. ed.); vol. 1 ISBN 978-8890022654; vol. 2 ISBN 978-8890022661.
- Garzilli, Enrica, Mussolini's Explorer: The Adventures of Giuseppe Tucci and Italian Policy in the Orient from Mussolini to Andreotti. With the Correspondence of Giulio Andreotti (volume 1), Milan: Asiatica Association, 2016; ISBN 978-8890022692.
- Harrer, Heinrich Seven Years in Tibet,(1953) EP Dutton & Co, New York
- Komroff, Manuel (editor)(1928). Contemporaries of Marco Polo Boni & Liveright, New York
- Lach, Donald F & Van Kley, Edwin J Asia in the Making of Europe (Vol III), University of Chicago Press, Chicago, 1993
- MacGregor, John.Tibet: A Chronicle of Exploration, (1970) Routledge & Kegan Paul, London, ISBN 0-7100-6615-5
- Passport Books: Tibet (1986) Shangri-La Press
- Rockhill, William Woodville Journey of William of Rubruck to The Eastern Parts of the World: 1253–1255,(1900) Bedford Press, London, SBN 7100-6615-5
- Teltscher, Kate.The High Road to China: George Bogle, the Panchen Lama and the First British Expedition to Tibet, Bloomsbury, London, (2006) ISBN 0-374-21700-9; ISBN 978-0-7475-8484-1; Farrar, Straus and Giroux, New York. ISBN 978-0-374-21700-6
- Turner, Samuel An Account of an Embassy to the Court of the Teshoo Lama in Tibet: Containing a Narrative of a Journey Through Bootan, and Part of Tibet, W. Bulmer and Co, London, (1800)
- Waller, Derek. The Pundits: British Exploration of Tibet and Central Asia, University Press of Kentucky, Louisville, (2004) ISBN 978-0-8131-9100-3
- Yule, Sir Henry Cathy and the Way Thither, Vol. 1, (1916) Hakluyt Society, London
