= Luis Antonio Belluga y Moncada =

Catholic cardinal

His Eminence Luis Antonio Belluga y Moncada C.O.
- Cardinal-Priest of Santa Prassede
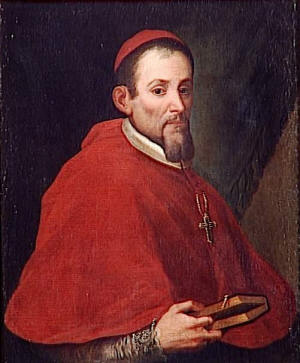
- Church: Roman Catholic
- Appointed: 3 September 1738
- Term ended: 22 February 1743
- Previous posts: Cardinal-Priest of Santa Maria in Trastevere (1737–38); Cardinal-Priest of Santa Prisca (1726–37); Cardinal-Priest of Santa Maria in Traspontina (1721–26); Bishop of Cartagena (1705–24)

Orders
- Ordination: 22 February 1687
- Consecration: 19 April 1705 by Pedro de Salazar Gutiérrez de Toledo
- Created cardinal: 29 November 1719 by Pope Clement XI
- Rank: Cardinal-Priest

Personal details
- Born: 30 November 1662 Motril, Spain
- Died: 22 February 1743 (aged 80) Rome, Papal States
- Buried: Santa Maria in Vallicella

Luis Antonio Belluga y Moncada (30 November 1662 – 22 February 1743) was a prominent Spanish churchman and statesman during the 18th century.

== Biography ==
Born in Motril, Province of Granada, he was ordained at the age of 14. He served as a lector at the Cathedral of Córdoba, canon at the Cathedral of Zamora, and professor in the Colegio de Santiago in Granada.

He supported Philip V of Spain and the Bourbons during the War of Spanish Succession, and was named by Philip bishop of Cartagena on 9 February 1705, as well as viceroy of Valencia and Murcia where he won the Battle of Murcia. Pope Clement X named him cardinal on 29 November 1719. He served as Camerlengo of the Sacred College of Cardinals (1728–1729), and as a crown-cardinal (circa 1732).

He undertook major urban development and revitalization schemes in Murcia and in Vega Baja del Segura, where he initiated the colonization of uncultivated lands, founded new towns, established a seminary for theologians, drained swamps, and built hospices and hospitals.

In 1736, he provided support to the Capuchin missionary Francesco Orazio della Penna when the latter sought help for his mission in Tibet.

== Legacy ==
A street is named after him in his hometown of Motril, where there is also a statue.

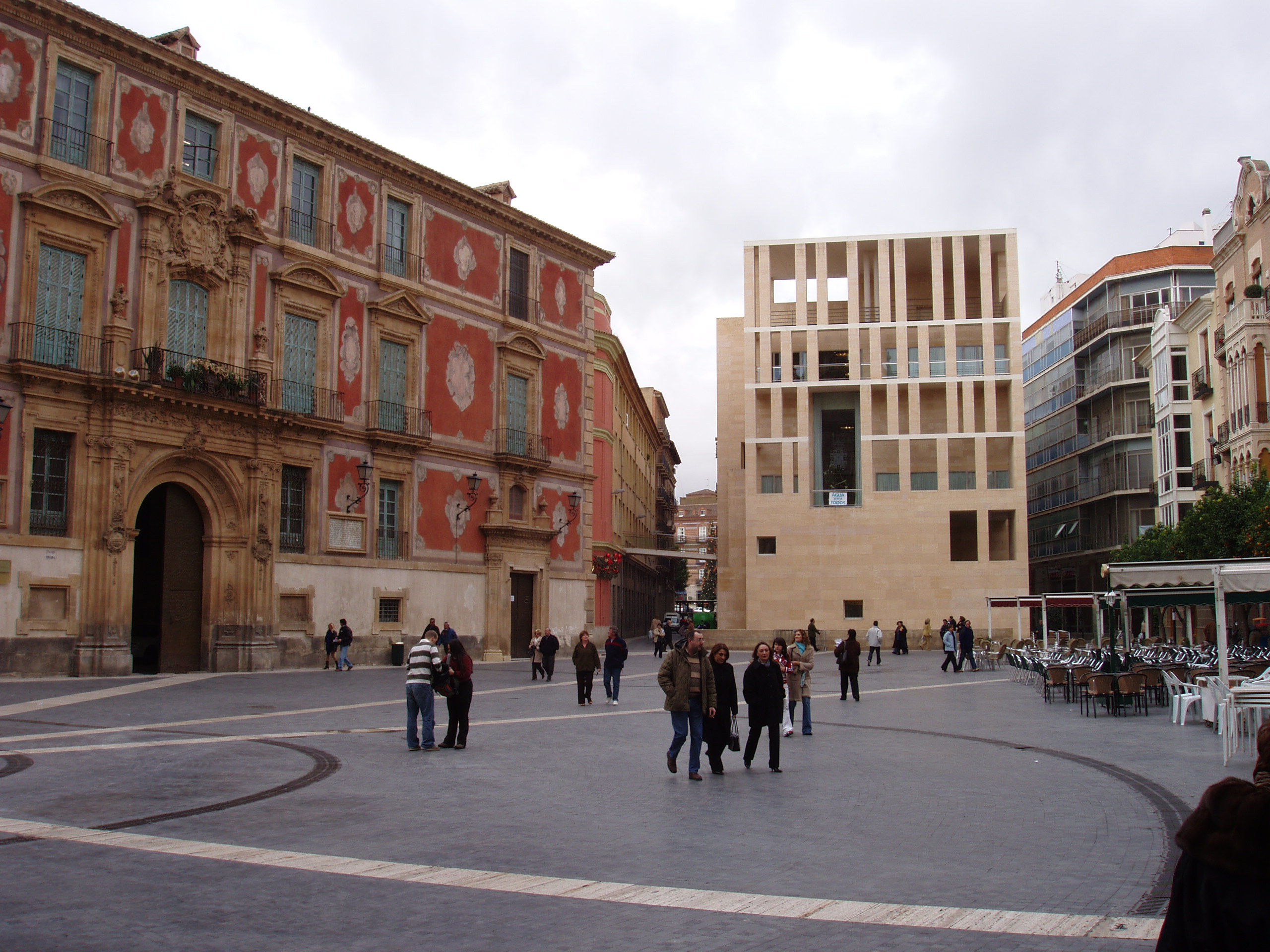
Plaza del Cardenal Belluga, Cardinal Belluga Square, seen from the Cathedral of Murcia.

The Plaza del Cardenal Belluga in Murcia is named after him. The Cathedral of Murcia, the episcopal palace of the Diocese of Cartagena, and the Town Hall (with a controversial extension to the town hall by Rafael Moneo) are found on this square.

== Resources ==
- (es) Díaz Gómez, J.A. (2017), Luis Antonio Belluga: trayectoria de un cardenal oratoriano y su vinculación a la Chiesa Nuova, Annales Oratorii 15: 121-154.
- (es) Díaz Gómez, J.A. (2016), Arte y mecenazgo en las fundaciones pías del cardenal Belluga bajo los reales auspicios de Felipe V. La irrenunciable herencia filipense, en M.M. Albero Muñoz y M. Pérez Sánchez (eds.), Las artes de un espacio y un tiempo: el setecientos borbónico: 57-75. Madrid: Fundación Universitaria Española.
- (es) Linage Conde, A. (1978), Una biografía inédita del cardenal Belluga, por el obispo de Ceuta Martín Barcia (1746), Murgetana 52: 113-134.
- (es) López-Guadalupe Muñoz, J.J. (2004), El mecenazgo artístico del Cardenal Belluga: la Capilla de la Virgen de los Dolores en la Iglesia Mayor de Motril, Imafronte 17: 81-112.
- (es) Vilar Ramírez, J.B. (2001), El cardenal Luis Belluga. Granada: Comares.
