= Catholic Church in Tibet =

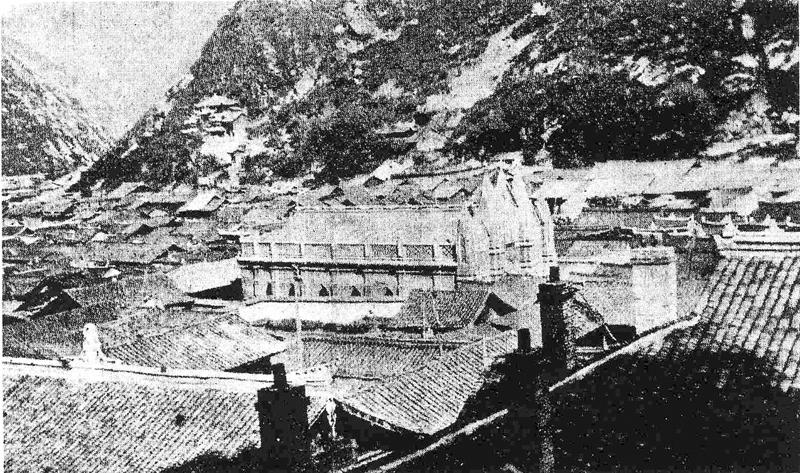
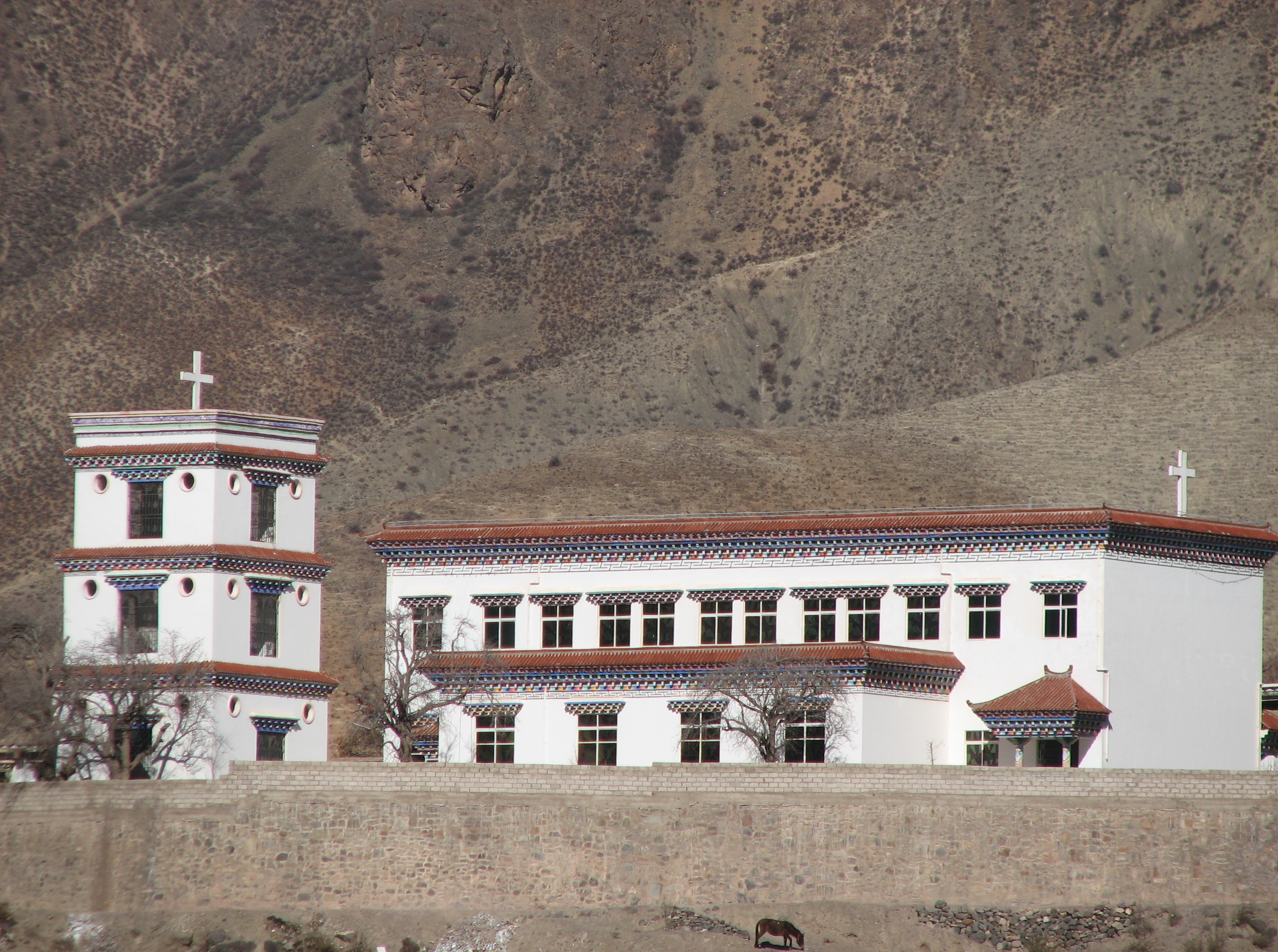
- Above: former Cathedral of the Sacred Heart at Dartsedo (Sichuanese Tibet), seat of the Apostolic Vicariate of Tibet. Below: Our Lady of the Sacred Heart Church at Yerkalo, the only Catholic church in the Tibet Autonomous Region.
- Classification: Catholic
- Orientation: Latin
- Scripture: Catholic Bible
- Theology: Catholic theology
- Polity: Episcopal
- Governance: CPA and BCCCC (controversial)
- Pope: Leo XIV
- Bishop of Kangding: Sede vacante
- Region: Tibet Autonomous Region; Sichuanese Tibet: Garzê Tibetan Autonomous Prefecture; Ngawa Tibetan and Qiang Autonomous Prefecture; Yunnanese Tibet: Dêqên Tibetan Autonomous Prefecture; Kokang Derung and Nu Autonomous County; former territories until 1929: Sikkim and Bhutan
- Language: Tibetan, Sichuanese, Yunnanese, Latin
- Headquarters: Dartsedo, Garzê Tibetan Autonomous Prefecture, Sichuan
- Founder: Western Tibet: António de Andrade (Jesuit); Italian Capuchins; Eastern Tibet: Paris Foreign Missions Society; Augustinian canons of Great Saint Bernard
- Origin: Western Tibet: 1624 (402 years ago); Eastern Tibet: 1846 (180 years ago); Guge, western Tibet; Dartsedo, eastern Tibet

The Catholic Church is a minority religious organization in Tibet, where Tibetan Buddhism is the faith of the majority of people. Its origin dates from the 17th century, when António de Andrade, a Portuguese Jesuit through Jesuit missions in Tibet, introduced Catholicism into the Kingdom of Guge in western Tibet.

The Catholic Church of Lhasa was the first Catholic church built in Tibet, but was destroyed in 1745. Today, Our Lady of the Sacred Heart Church at Yerkalo in Chamdo is the only Catholic church in the Chinese communist government-designated Tibet Autonomous Region, in addition to chapels and churches scattered throughout the incorporated Tibetan territories in Sichuan (Szechwan) and Yunnan.

== History ==
=== 17th and 18th centuries ===
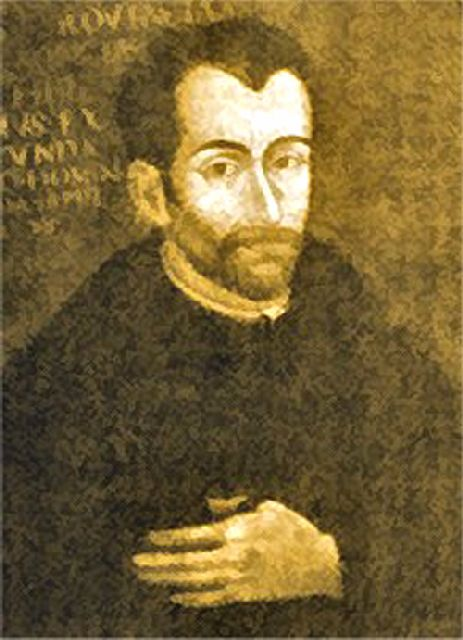
António de Andrade, first Catholic missionary in Tibet.

The first Catholic missionaries to arrive in Tibet, António de Andrade and Manuel Marques, reached the Kingdom of Guge (western Tibet) in 1624. They were welcomed by the royal family and later allowed to build a church. These two Portuguese Goa-based Jesuits had the benefit of the syncretic policy of Akbar (1542–1605), maintained by his son Jahangir (1569–1627), which allowed them to develop freely in an environment under Muslim authority.

In 1627, there were about a hundred converts in the kingdom. Catholicism also spread to Rudok, Ladakh (Indian Tibet) and Ü-Tsang (Central Tibet), and was welcomed by the ruler of the kingdom of Ü-Tsang, where in 1626 Andrade and his companions established a Jesuit outpost at Shigatse. In 1635, a six-missionary expedition to Tsaparang, capital of Guge, was led by Nuño Coresma, a Spanish Jesuit.

In 1661, an Austrian Jesuit missionary Johann Grueber crossed Tibet from Sining to Lhasa, where he spent a month, before heading to Nepal. During his six-year stay in Tibet (1715–1721), Italian Jesuit missionary Fr. Ippolito Desideri became the first Tibetologist.

After some months of intensive study he entered the Sera Buddhist monastery, one of the three great monastic universities of the politically ascendant Gelukpa sect. He was permitted to offer the Tridentine Mass at a Roman Catholic altar erected inside his rooms. There Fr. Desideri both studied and debated with Tibetan Buddhist monks and scholars, who he found were every bit as curious about Roman Catholicism as Desideri was about Tibetan Buddhism. Desideri befriended many of these scholars and, despite their religious disagreements, recalled them warmly in his memoirs. He learned the Classical Tibetan literary language (unknown to Europeans before) and became a voracious student of Tibetan literature, philosophy, and culture.

Between 1718 and 1721 he composed five works in the Classical Tibetan literary language, in which he sought to refute the philosophical concepts of rebirth (which he referred to as "metempsychosis") and Nihilism or 'Emptiness' (Wylie: stong pa nyid; Sanskrit: Śūnyatā), which he felt most prevented conversions from Tibetan Buddhism to the Catholic Church. In his books Fr. Desideri also adopted and utilized multiple philosophical techniques from Tibetan literature for scholastic argumentation. Fr. Desideri also used multiple quotations from the dharma and vinaya, and even brought the Scholasticism of St. Thomas Aquinas into a debate with the nihilistic Madhyamaka philosophy of Nagarjuna to argue his case for "the superiority of Christian theology." Further Jesuit missions to Tibet and the publication of Fr. Desideri's writings were later forbidden by the Vatican's Congregation for the Propagation of the Faith, and his writings remained in unpublished manuscript form until the 19th, 20th, and early 21st centuries.

The 18th century also saw the arrival of several Capuchin missionaries supported by donations from New Spain, who built the no longer extant Catholic Church of Lhasa in 1726. In 1736, the Spanish cardinal Luis Antonio Belluga y Moncada supported the Capuchin missionary Francesco della Penna when the latter sought help for his evangelization in Tibet.

Beginning in the 17th century, the growth of Catholicism was encouraged by some Tibetan monarchs, their courts and the Buddhist monks of the Karmapa school to counterbalance the influence of the Gelug school until 1745, when all missionaries were expelled at the insistence of the Tibetan Buddhist monks. Tibet was closed to foreigners, although this district came under the authority of the Mission sui iuris of Hindustan in 1792, no more missionaries arrived until 1844.

=== 19th century ===
In 1844, Évariste Régis Huc, a French Lazarist, prepared his trip to Tibet at the suggestion of the Apostolic Vicar of Mongolia (Joseph-Martial Mouly). In September 1844 he arrived in Dolon Nor and made preparations for his journey. Shortly after, he was accompanied by a young fellow Lazarist, Joseph Gabet. In January 1845 they reached Tang-kiul, a frontier trading post between the Chinese, Mongolian, and Tibetan cultural spheres. Instead of undertaking an independent four-month trip to Lhasa, they waited eight months for a Tibetan embassy to return from Peking. Meanwhile, under the guidance of an intelligent teacher, they studied the Tibetan language and Buddhist literature. During the three months of their stay they resided in Kumbum Monastery, which was said to have capacity for 4,000 people.

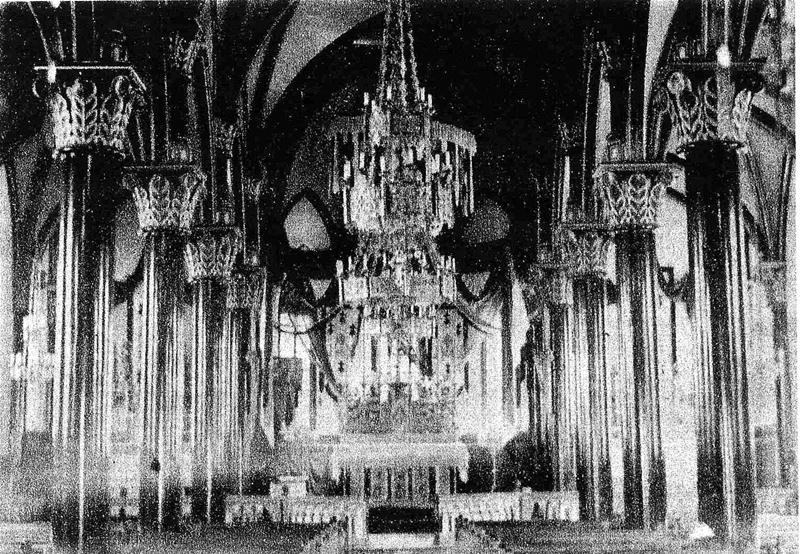
Interior of the former Cathedral of the Sacred Heart at Dartsedo

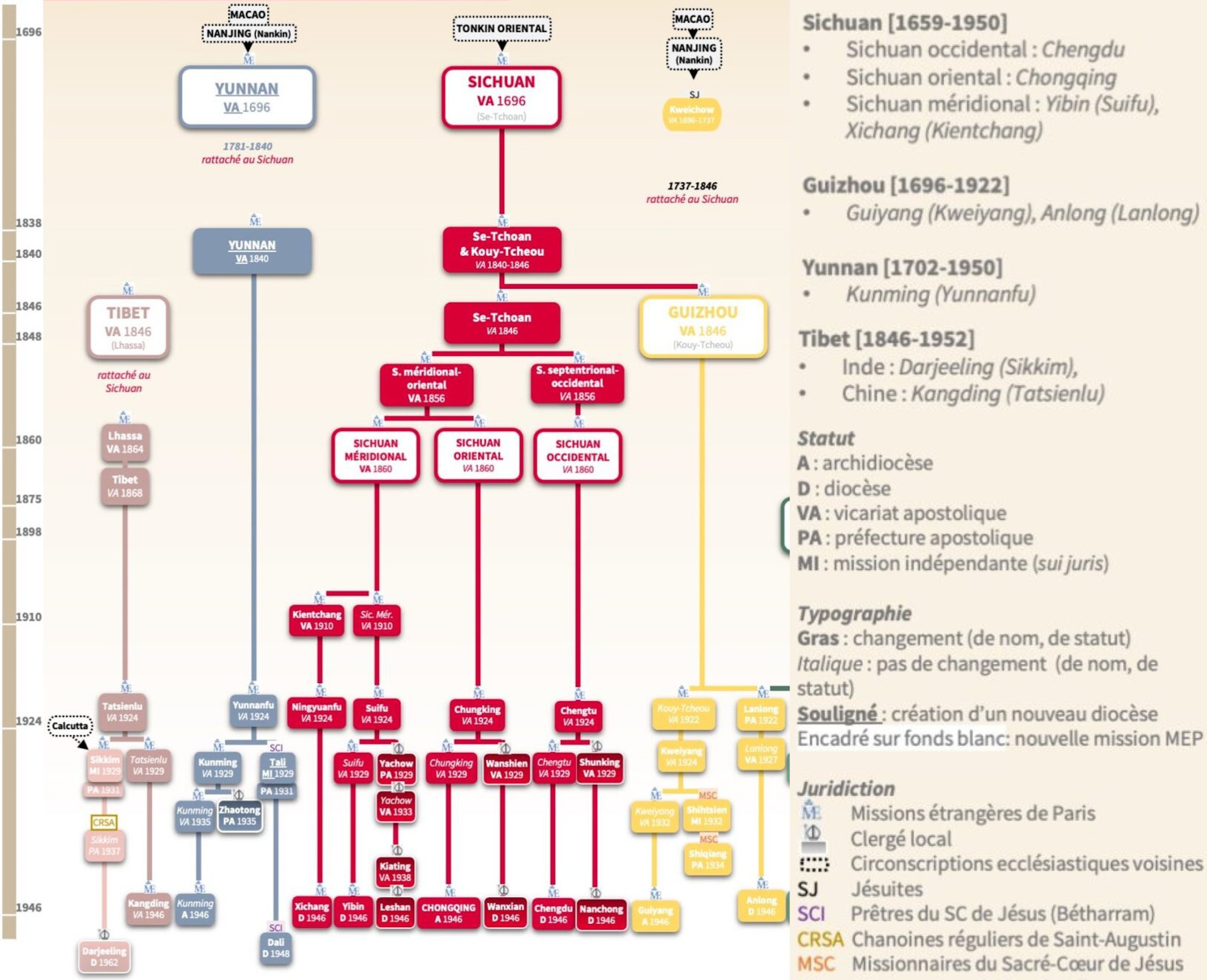
Genealogy of MEP ecclesiastical jurisdiction in Sichuan, with its three attachments: Tibet, Yunnan and Guizhou.

On March 27, 1846, the Apostolic Vicariate of Lhasa (now Diocese of Kangding, or Dartsedo) was erected with the brief Ex debito from Pope Gregory XVI, obtaining territory from the Apostolic Vicariate of Szechwan and the Apostolic Vicariate of Tibet-Hindustan. Evangelization was entrusted to the Paris Foreign Missions Society (MEP). In 1847, Charles-René Renou set out disguised as a merchant for Dartsedo and then continued his journey towards Chamdo. He was recognized and arrested in 1848 and escorted back to Guangzhou, southern China. At the same time, Nicolas Krick and Augustin Bourry approached Tibet from the south, from Assam in northeastern India. In 1856, Pope Pius IX commissioned Eugène-Jean-Claude-Joseph Desflèches, Apostolic Vicar of Eastern Szechwan, to choose a vicar for the Mission of Lhasa. The next year, Léon Thomine Desmazures was installed as the first Apostolic Vicar of Lhasa. In 1865, Félix Biet and Auguste Desgodins established the parish of Yerkalo in Chamdo. The parish church was blessed on August 15, 1873, and dedicated to Our Lady of the Sacred Heart.

In Yunnanese Tibet, following the establishment of the parish of Tsekou (later transferred to Cizhong; Sacred Heart Church, Cizhong) in 1867 by Jules Dubernard, Xiaoweixi (Sacred Heart Church, 1880), Dimaluo (Sacred Heart of Jesus Church, 1899) and Zhongding (Sacred Heart Church, 1908) were successively occupied by French missionaries. Although the last two are located in the Nu and Lisu lands, this district was still part of the Mission of Tibet and later of the Diocese of Kangding.

=== 20th century ===
After the British expedition to Tibet in 1904, Auguste Desgodins was appointed "parish priest of Lhasa" by Pierre-Philippe Giraudeau, Apostolic Vicar of Tibet, but he never traveled to Lhasa. In 1905, four French missionaries were killed in the Bathang uprising, including Jean-André Soulié. He was captured, tortured and shot by lamas close to Yaregong. Nine years later (1914), Jean-Théodore Monbeig, another French missionary working in the Sichuan-Tibetan border region, was killed by lamas near Lithang, not long after helping revive the Christian community at Bathang.

After the fall of the Manchu empire in 1911, attempted invasions of Tibet in 1917 and in 1930 did not help the establishment of the Paris Foreign Missions. Some of these missionaries had difficulty adapting to the climate, so after 1930 a dozen Augustinian canons of the Hospitaller Congregation of Great Saint Bernard were sent to Yunnanese Tibet at the invitation of Jean de Guébriant, Apostolic Vicar of Kienchang. These were young missionaries seasoned in the Swiss Alps, who also had a project of building a hospice in 1933 in the Latsa pass, between the valleys of the Mekong and Salween rivers.

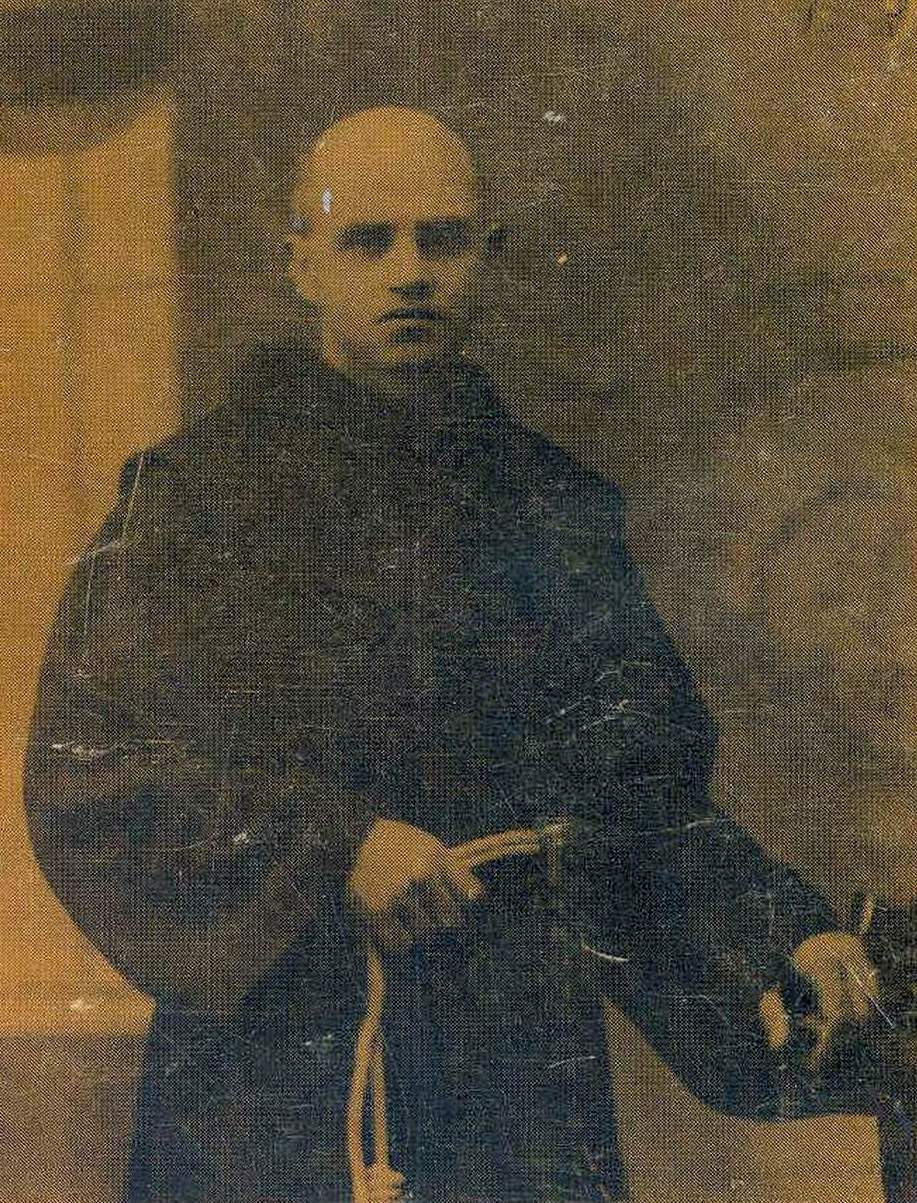
Pascual Nadal Oltra, Spanish Franciscan missionary to a Tibetan leper colony, beheaded by the Chinese Red Army during the Long March in 1935.

In 1930, Pascual Nadal Oltra, a Pego-born Spanish Franciscan friar and artist, arrived in Mosimien (a.k.a. Boxab by its Tibetan name), a small town located in Sichuanese Tibet. With the support of the Bishop of Tatsienlu (Pierre-Philippe Giraudeau) and his coadjutor Pierre Valentin, Oltra, the Father Guardian Plácido Albiero, a Canadian friar Bernabé Lafond and an Italian José Andreatta formed the founding community of a leper colony established near St. Anne's Church, known as St. Joseph's Home. In May 1935, a Chinese Red Army column led by Mao Zedong (Mao Tse Tung) was fleeing Chiang Kai-shek's regular army to northwest China through the Mosimien area, part of a military retreat later known as Long March. According to the Valencian Franciscan friar José Miguel Barrachina Lapiedra, author of the book Fray Pascual Nadal y Oltra: Apóstol de los leprosos, mártir de China, and a report published in Malaya Catholic Leader, the official newspaper of the Archdiocese of Singapore: "The communist soldiers entered the leper colony, they looted the residence and arrested the friars and sisters. Many of the lepers tried to defend the missionaries, but they were shot by the soldiers. The Franciscans were then brought before Mao Tse Tung, who interrogated them, imprisoned two of them, Pascual Nadal Oltra and an Italian friar Epifanio Pegoraro, and released the rest. There were more than 30,000 Reds in the band, including a large number of women. Before their departure, the soldiers ransacked the village, carrying away everything movable and edible, left the people of the district without means of subsistence. Days later, on 4 December 1935, the army reached Leang Ho Kow, Tsanlha, where the two Franciscans were beheaded with a sword." Nevertheless, the missionaries managed to recover and welcome back the sick after the devastation, who in 1937 were 148 people.

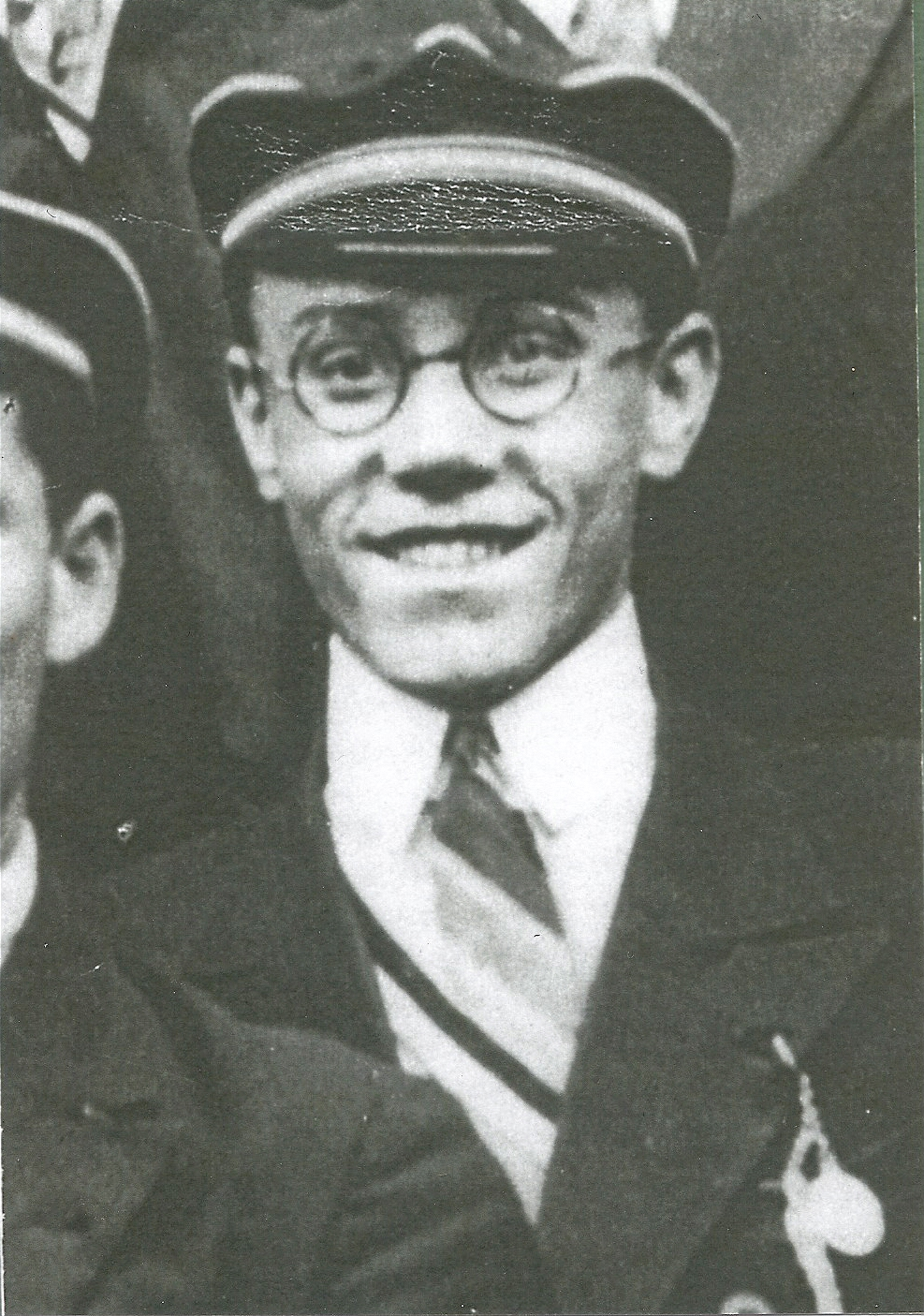
Blessed Maurice Tornay, Augustinian missionary and parish priest at Our Lady of the Sacred Heart Church at Yerkalo, ambushed and murdered by Tibetan Buddhist monks from the Karma Gon Monastery in 1949. Beatified by Pope John Paul II in 1993.

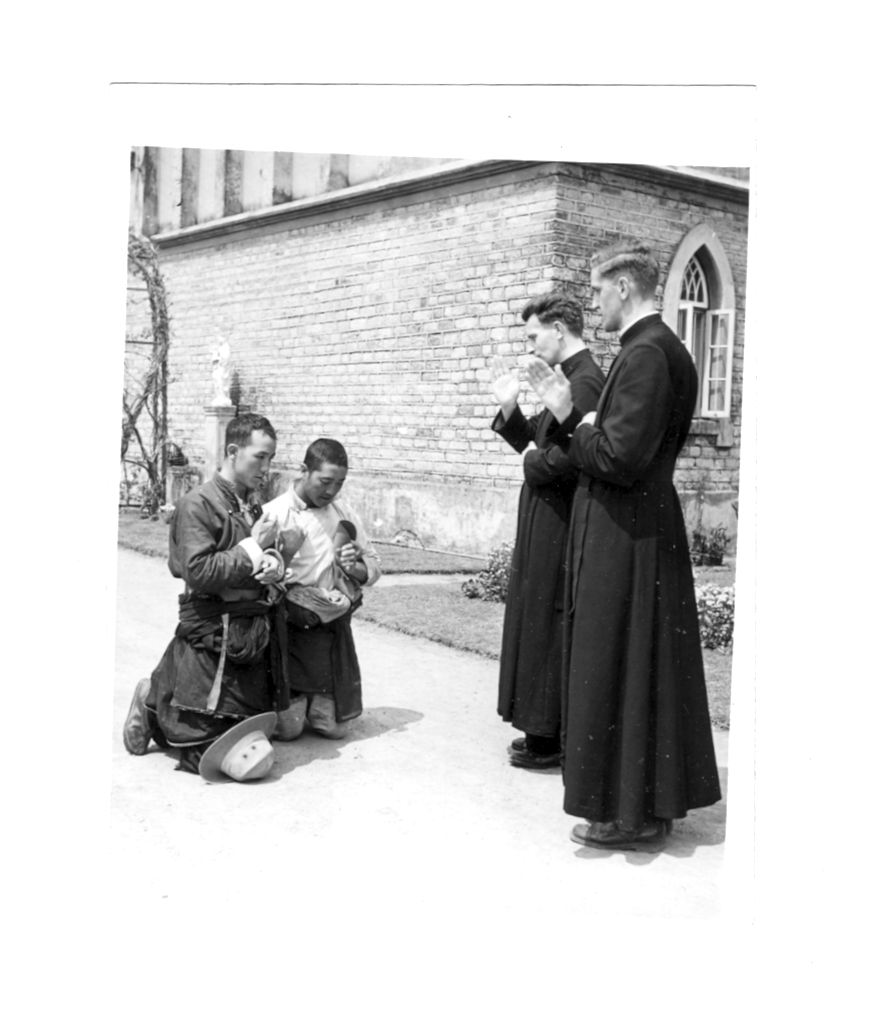
Casimir Sandjrou, kneeling with his hat on the ground, was Tornay's traveling companion and witness to his final days.

In 1945, Valais-born Maurice Tornay, a member of the aforementioned Canons Regular of the Hospitaller Congregation of Great Saint Bernard, was appointed parish priest of Our Lady of the Sacred Heart Church at Yerkalo, after completing his theological and local language studies in Weisi. Repeated acts of violence and religious persecution by Buddhist monks from the local Karma Gon Monastery drove Fr. Tornay from his parish, but ultimately led him to travel to Lhasa disguised as a pilgrim seeking to appeal to the 14th Dalai Lama for religious toleration to be granted to Tibetan Christians. On 11 August 1949, he was ambushed and assassinated by four armed Tibetan Buddhist monks at Cho La, Sichuan. He was beatified as a Catholic martyr on May 16, 1993, by Pope John Paul II.

Tornay's traveling companion was a Tibetan Catholic named Casimir Sandjrou, who acted as a faithful guide to him during his final, dangerous journey toward Lhasa. As a trusted ally, Sandjrou accompanied Tornay through difficult terrain and witnessed his final days and spiritual preparation for death. He was with Tornay when they attempted to pass through checkpoints, such as at Atuntze. He provided testimony about Tornay's final actions, noting that Tornay prayed the rosary and, despite the danger, expressed forgiveness for his enemies before he was killed.

== Current situation ==
Both militant state atheism and severe anti-religious persecution began immediately and have continued ever since the invasion and Annexation of Tibet by the People's Republic of China. Both clergy and laity were arrested and sent to Laogai concentration camps and "thought reform centers", where they experienced severe psychological abuse in a vindictive prison setting. Ever since, Catholicism in China, like all religions in the country, are permitted to operate only under the strict supervision and control of the State Administration for Religious Affairs. All legal worship has to be conducted in government-approved churches belonging to the Catholic Patriotic Association, which is State controlled and rejects papal primacy. Even so, Roman Catholicism still has followers among ethnic Tibetans and the strictly illegal and Pro-Vatican Underground Church continues to remain active throughout the region.

In 1952, following the expulsion of Pierre Valentin, the then Bishop of Kangding, the communist regime put an end to the missionary presence in Tibet, since then the Diocese of Kangding has been left without a bishop. According to a report by the Catholic International Press Agency, in 1989, a community of Catholics were found living in Lhasa, the capital of Tibet. A Church collaborator in Chongqing told the agency that there were approximately 10,000 Tibetan Catholics in the Diocese of Kangding. He further stated that, at the time, no one knew exactly the situation of the Catholic Church in that country.

In 1989, while an administrator of the Diocese of Qinzhou, John Baptist Wang Ruohan was consecrated "underground bishop" of Kangding by Paul Li Zhenrong, Bishop of Xianxian. In 2011, Bishop John Baptist Wang was arrested by Chinese security forces, along with his brothers, Bishop Casimir Wang Mi-lu and Father John Wang Ruowang, as well as a group of lay faithful, who do not belong to the government-authorized Catholic Patriotic Association.

On September 3, 2011, an attack occurred against a nun and a priest in Mosimien. Sister Xie Yuming and Father Huang Yusong were attacked by a dozen unknown assailants after attempting to recover two former properties of the Diocese of Kangding. The nun was brutally beaten while the priest suffered minor injuries. The properties, a former Latin school and a boys' school, are among several properties that were confiscated by authorities in the 1950s but were due to be returned to the diocese. At that time, the Latin school was demolished by the government and the land occupied by a private company; the boys' school was used as housing for officials of the Mosimien regional government. The attack sparked anger among many parishioners who gathered to protest in front of St. Anne's Church.

According to Baptiste Langlois-Meurinne, a member of the Raiders Scouts, in 2014, while helping with the development of the Tibetan Catholic populations of the Mekong and Salween valleys through the Sentiers du ciel association, he met a Vatican priest —that is, not affiliated to the official Chinese Patriotic Church but with the underground church— who organized a clandestine camp for Bareng children where he taught them Tibetan, English and catechism.

== Diocese of Kangding ==
The Apostolic Vicariate of Lhasa —which would become the Diocese of Kangding a century later— was erected on March 27, 1846, with the brief Ex debito from Pope Gregory XVI. This bishopric had been in full communion with the Pope in Rome until the establishment of the state-sanctioned Catholic Patriotic Church (1957) after the fall of mainland China and Tibet to communism in 1949 and 1951, respectively.

Jurisdictional changes made by the Catholic Patriotic Church and the Bishops' Conference of Catholic Church in China took place in the 1980s and the 1990s. On March 24, 1984, the territory of the Diocese of Kangding was placed under the jurisdiction of the Bishop of Ningyuan. On March 7, 1993, the Diocese of Jiading assumed authority over Kangding.

Diocese	French	Tibetan	Former name/spelling	Cathedral	History	Founded	Ref.
Diocese of Kangding	Ta-tsien-lou	Dartsedo	Kangting; Tatsienlu	Sacred Heart Cathedral, Kangding	•March 27, 1846: Established as the Apostolic Vicariate of Lhassa (Lhasa) with territory from the Apostolic Vicariate of Szechwan and the Apostolic Vicariate of Tibet-Hindustan •July 28, 1868: Renamed as the Apostolic Vicariate of Thibet (Tibet) •December 3, 1924: Renamed as the Apostolic Vicariate of Tatsienlu (today known as Kangding, in Sichuanese Tibet) •December 15, 1929: Lost territory to establish the Mission sui iuris of Sikkim •April 11, 1946: Elevated as the Diocese of Kangting	1846	
Map of the Tibetan Mission

=== Gallery ===
Except for the Catholic Church of Lhasa, all churches belong to the Diocese of Kangding (former Apostolic Vicariate of Lhasa/Tibet/Tatsienlu).

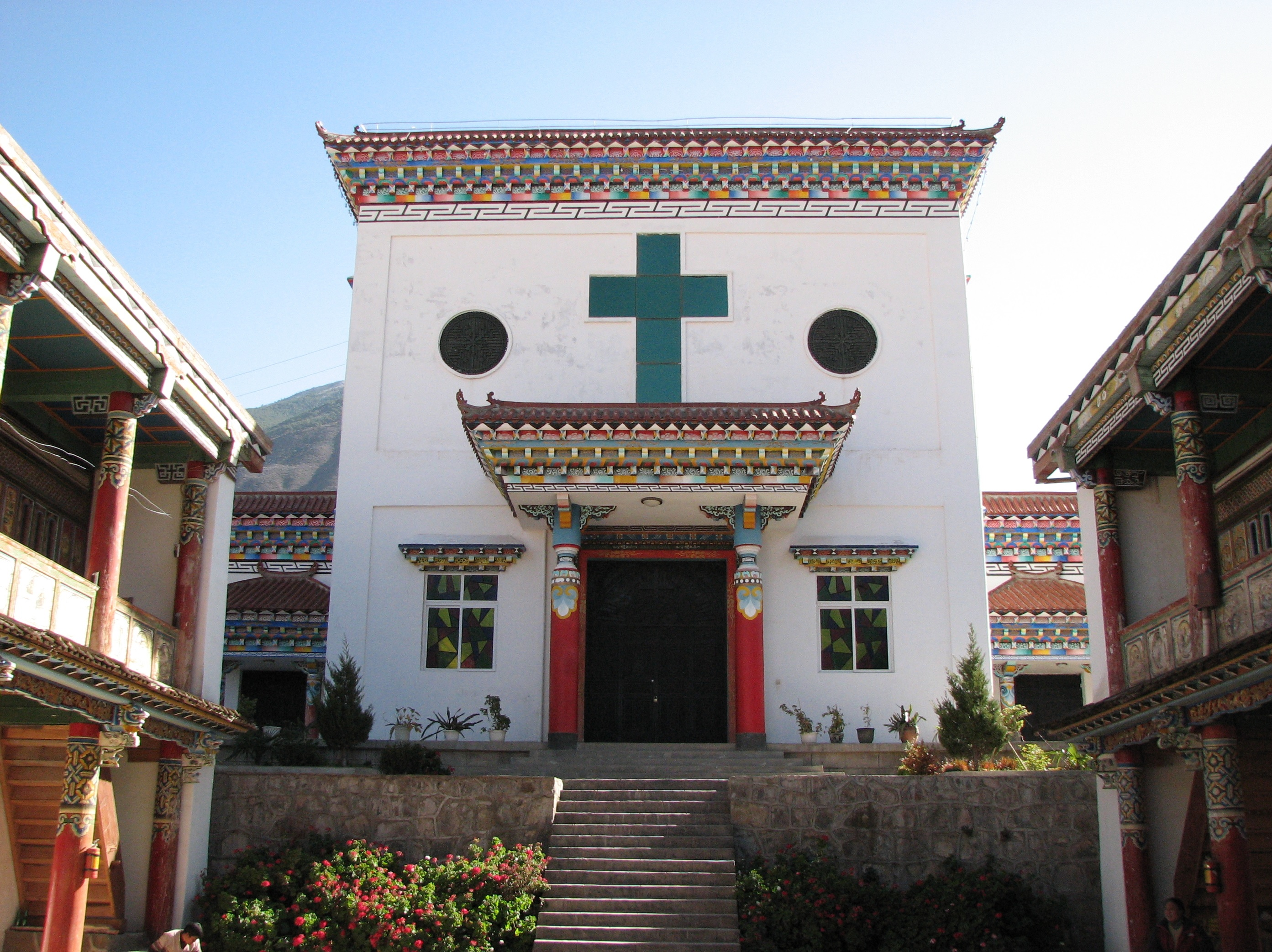
Our Lady of the Sacred Heart Church, Yerkalo (Tibet Autonomous Region)

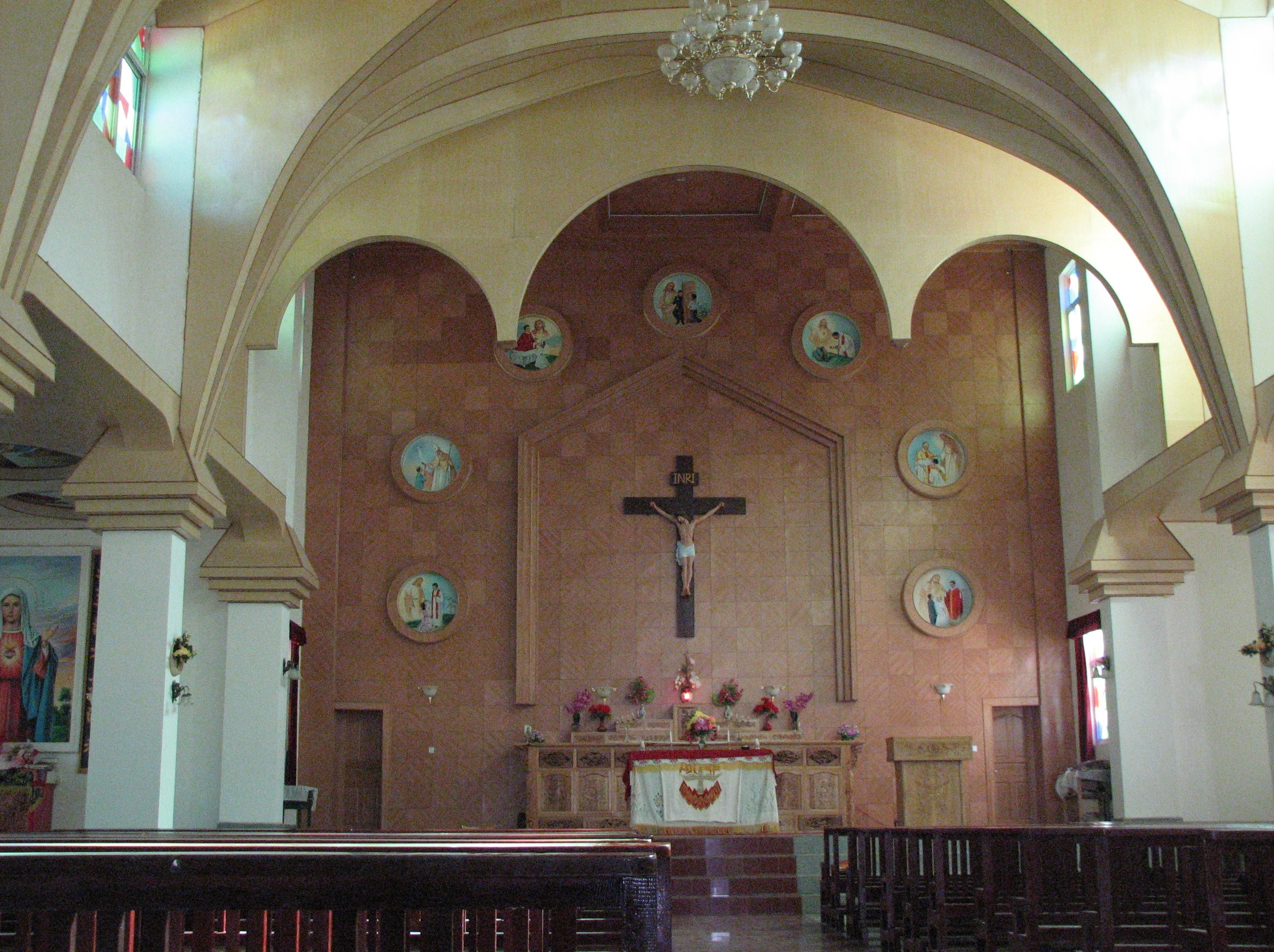
Interior of Our Lady of the Sacred Heart Church, Yerkalo

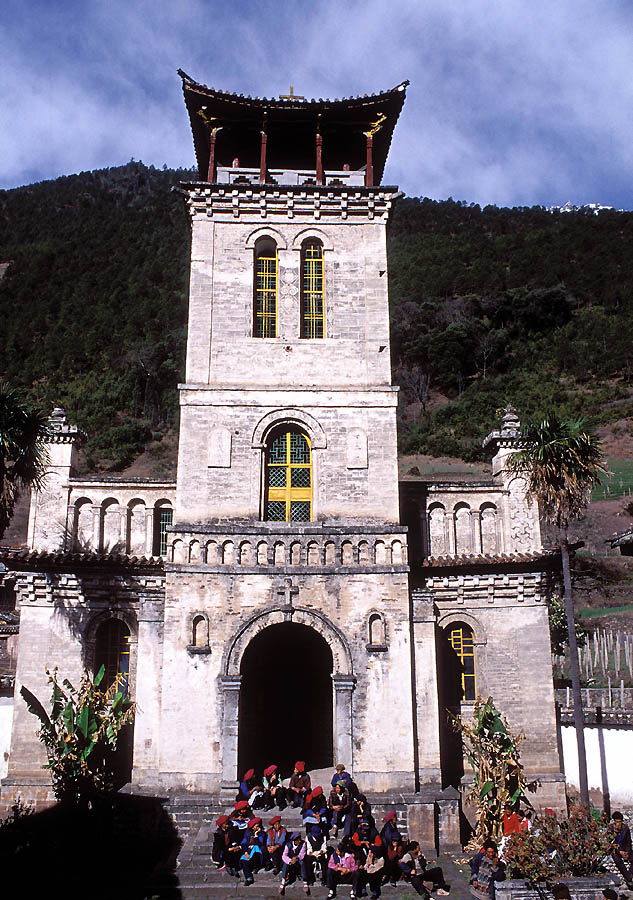
Sacred Heart Church, Cizhong (Yunnanese Tibet)

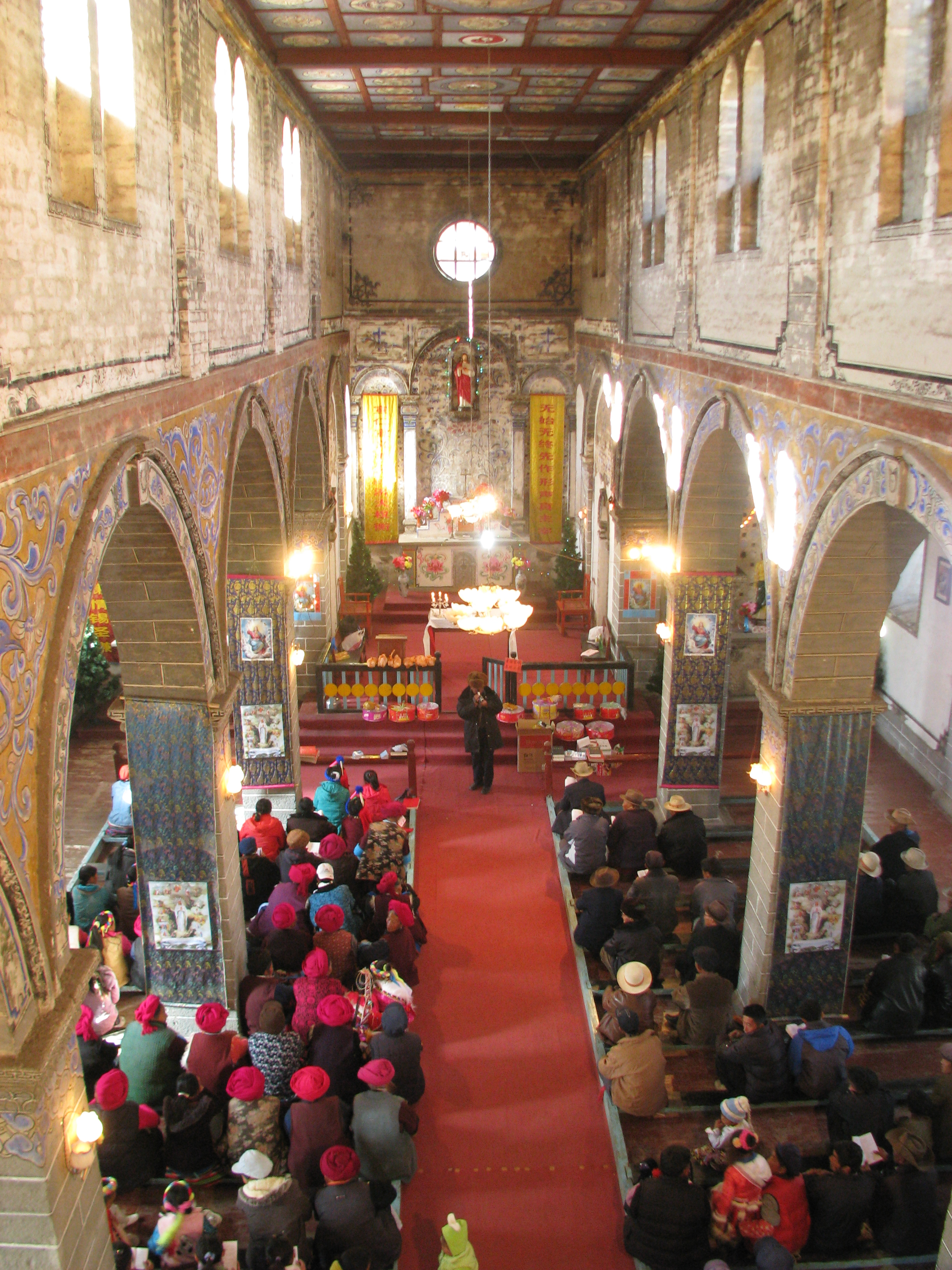
Interior of Sacred Heart Church, Cizhong

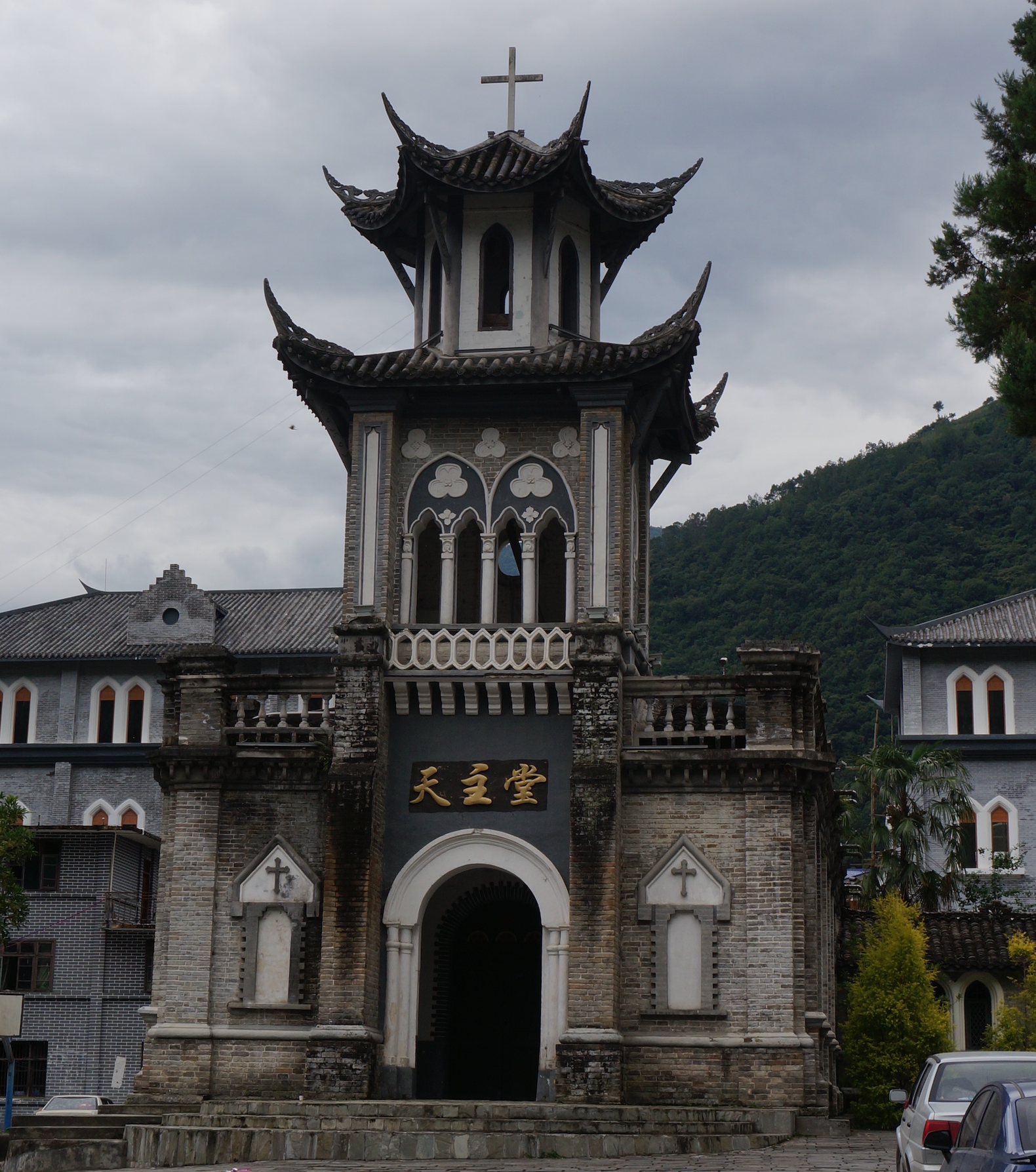
St. Anne's Church, Mosimien (Sichuanese Tibet)

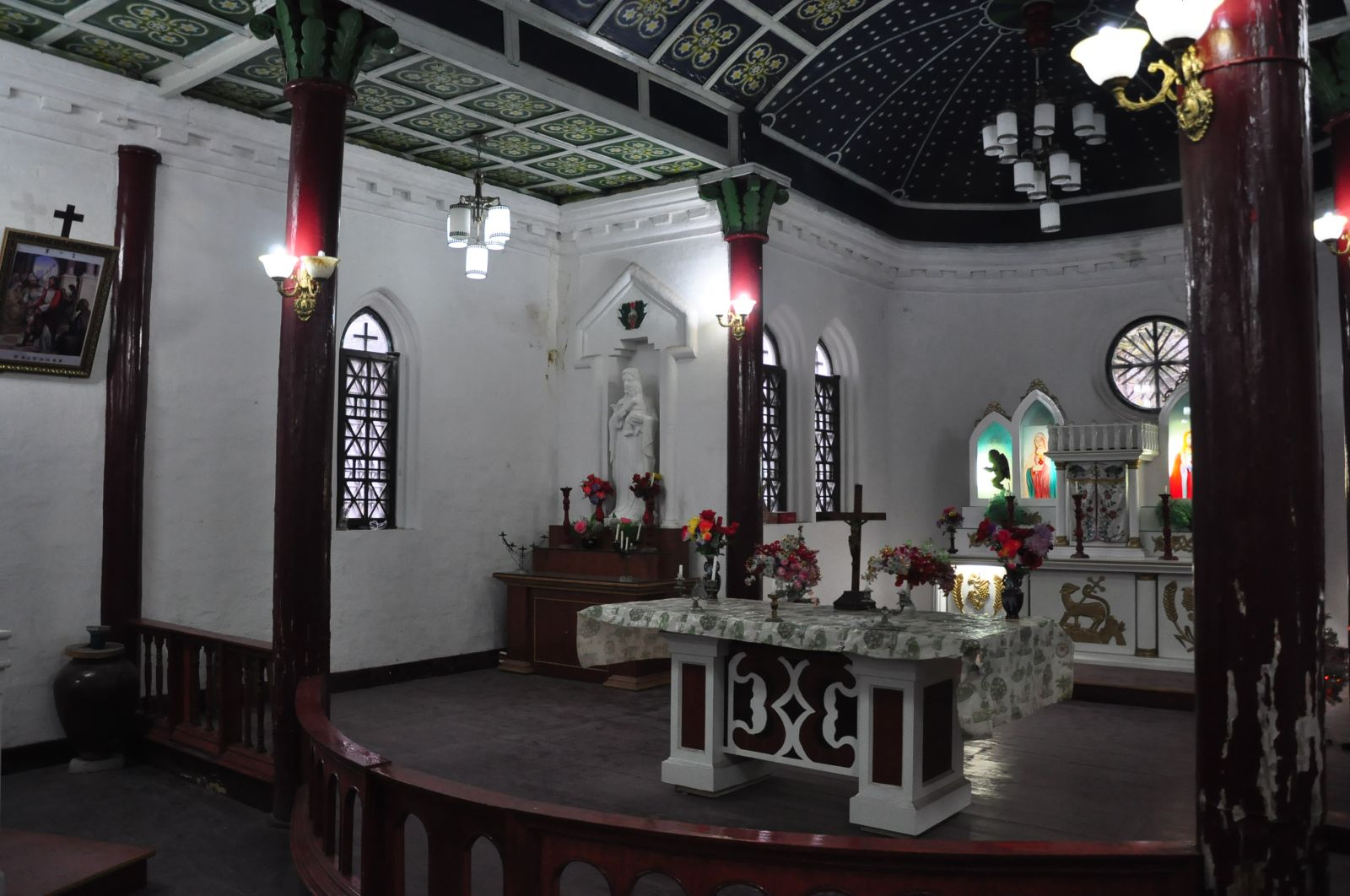
Altar of St. Anne's Church, Mosimien

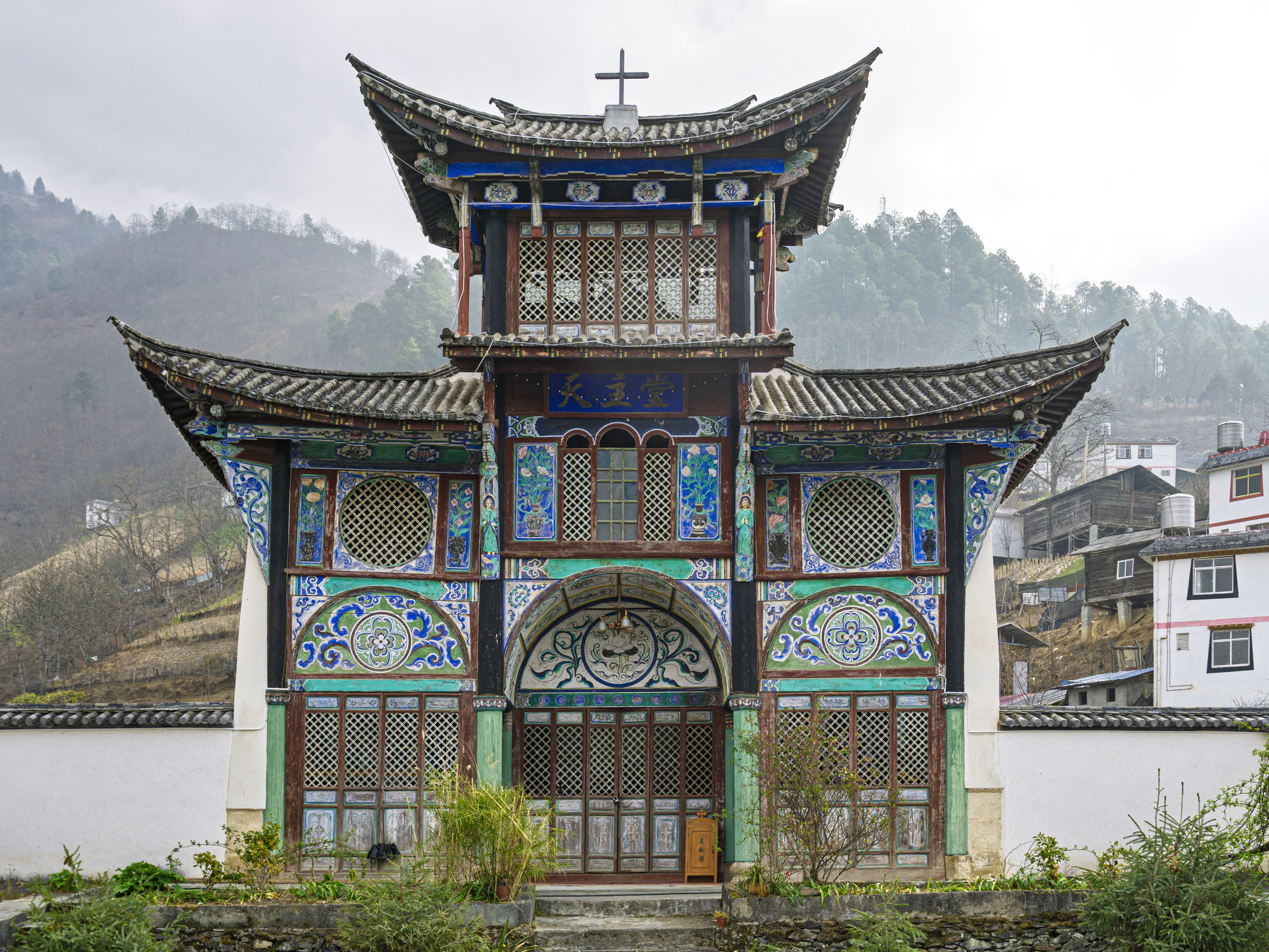
Sacred Heart of Jesus Church, Bahang (Dimaluo; part of Tibetan Mission)

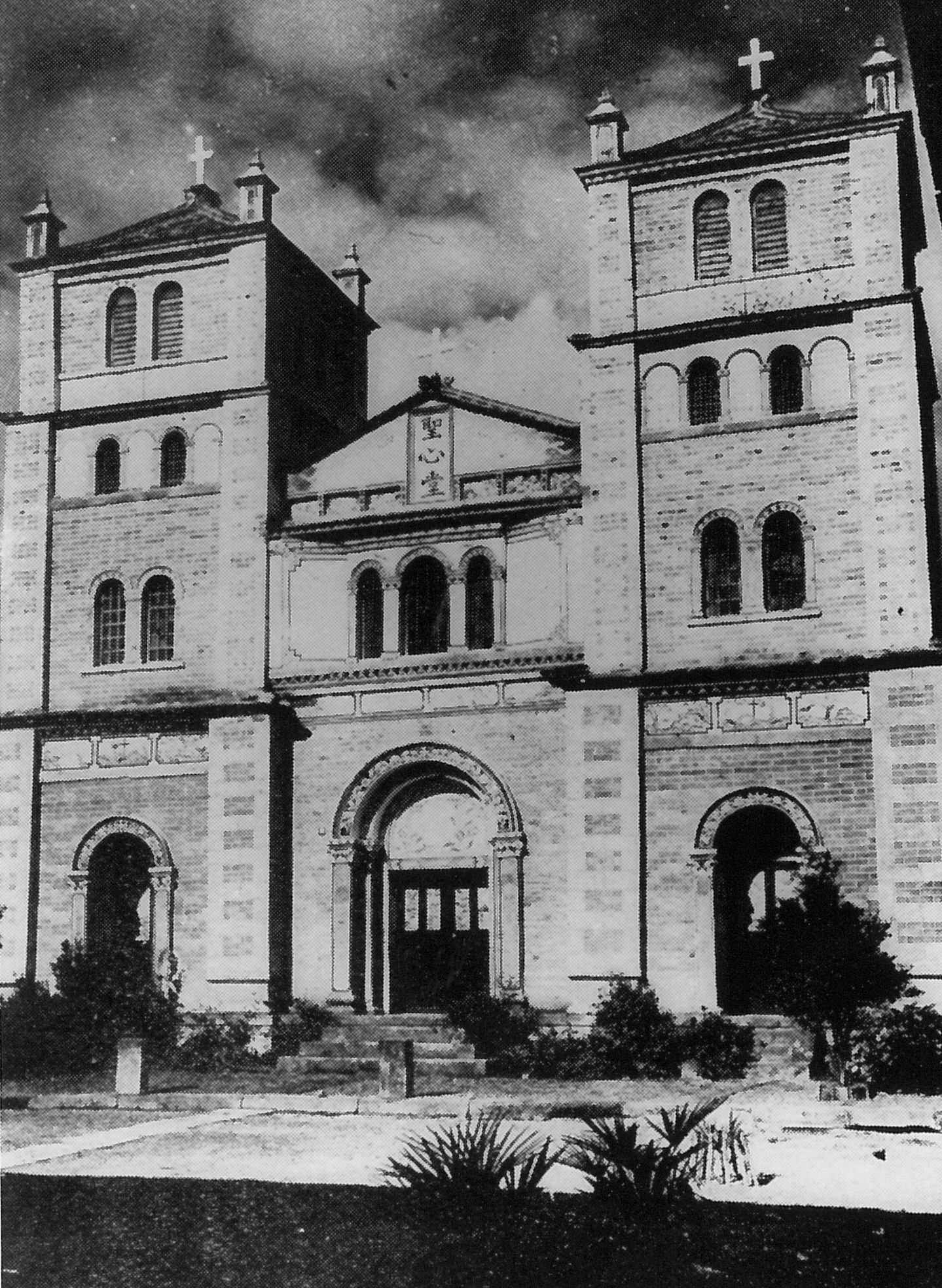
Former Sacred Heart Church, Zhongding (Koksang; part of Tibetan Mission)

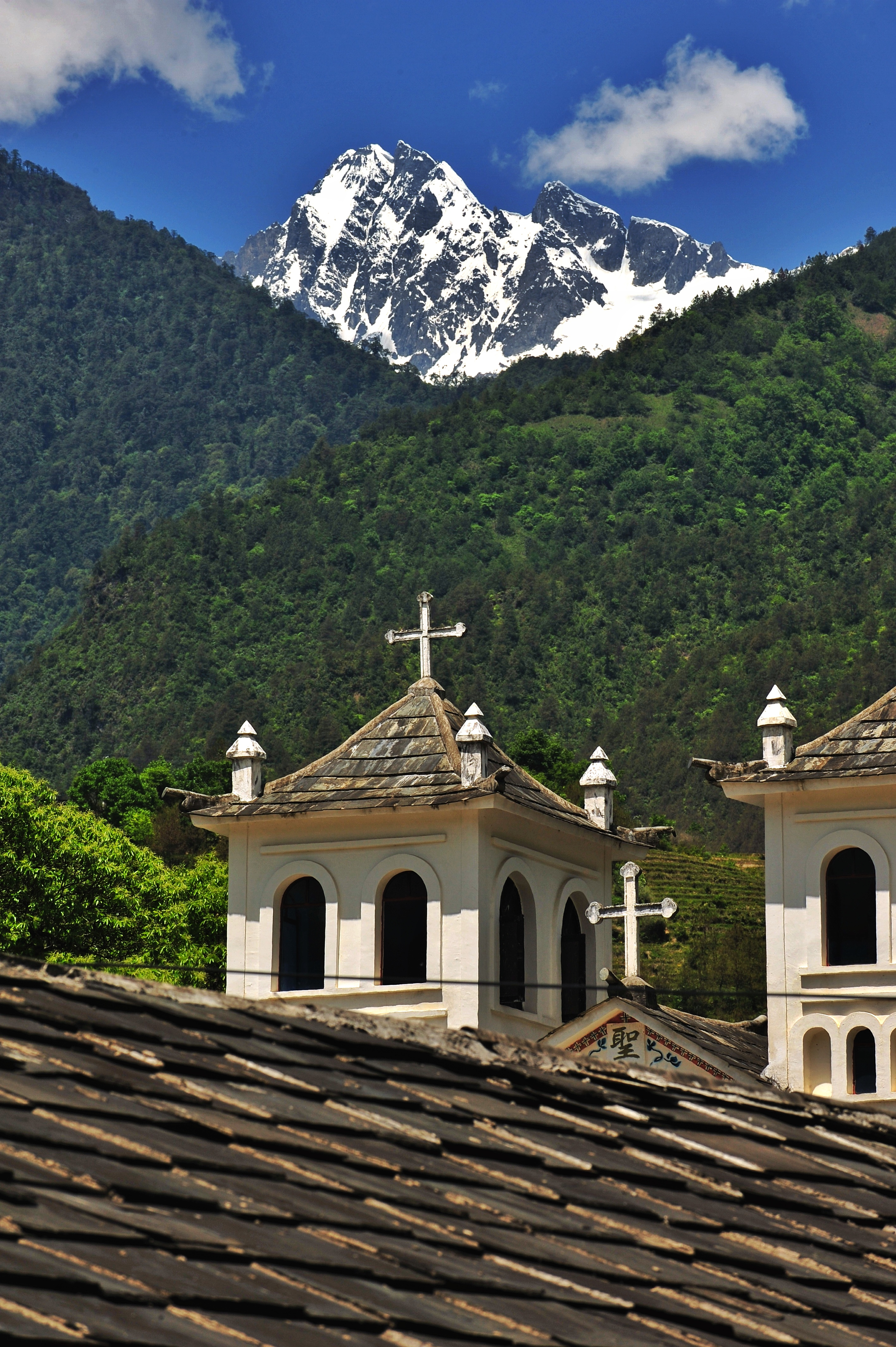
Rebuilt Sacred Heart Church, Zhongding

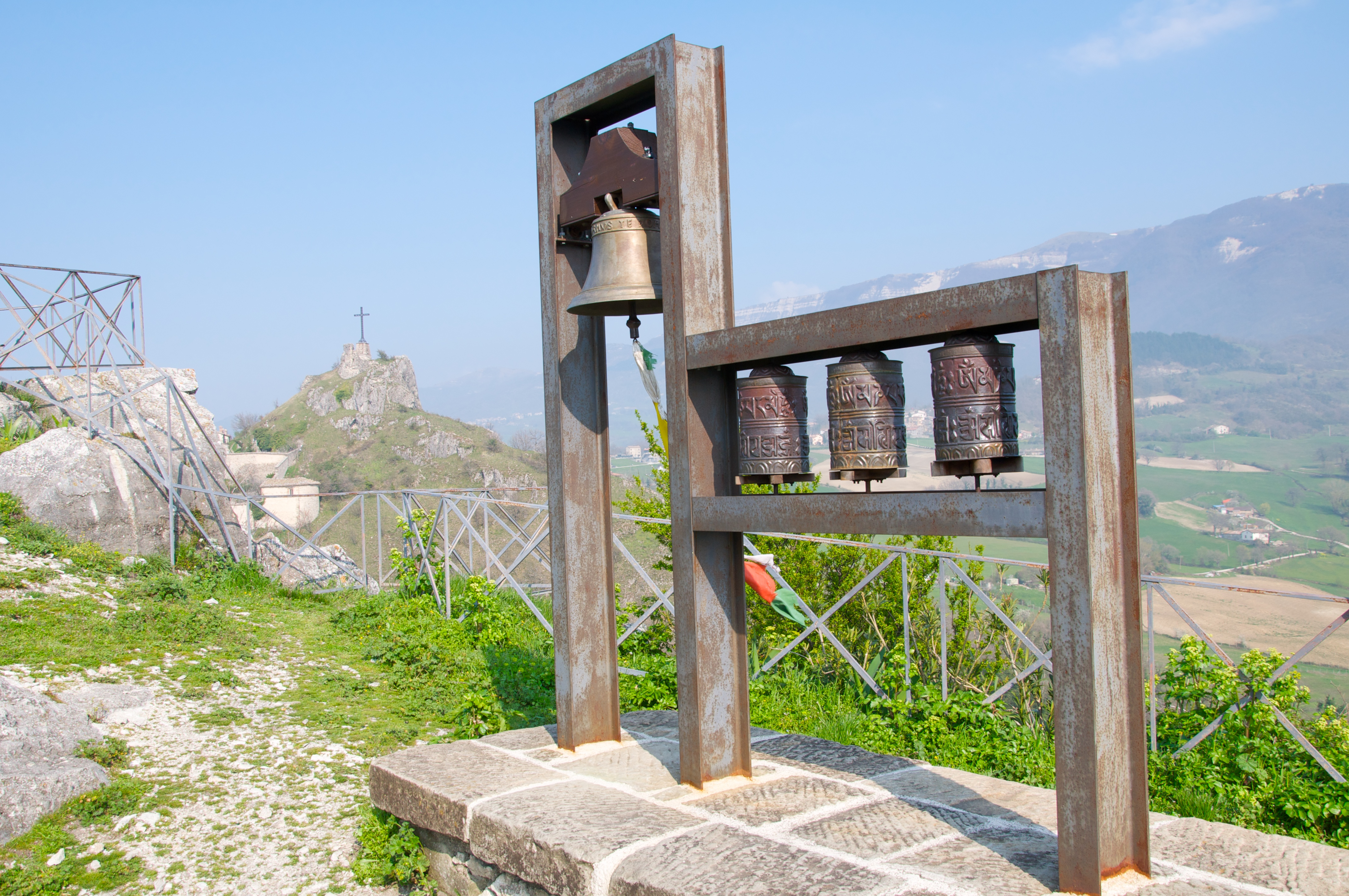
A surviving bell of the Catholic Church of Lhasa

== Blesseds and martyrs ==
Listed are those born, died, or lived in the jurisdictional areas of the Diocese of Kangding. In alphabetical order by surname:

=== Blesseds and servants of God ===
Image	Name	Date of birth	Place of birth	Date of death	Place of death
	S.D. Augustin Bourry	December 27, 1826	La Chapelle-Largeau, France	September 1, 1854	Sommeu, Tibet
	S.D. Nicolas Krick	March 1, 1819	Lixheim, France	September 1, 1854	Sommeu, Tibet
	Blessed Maurice Tornay	August 31, 1910	Orsières, Switzerland	August 11, 1949	Cho La, Sichuan

=== Non-canonized martyrs ===
Image	Name	Date of birth	Place of birth	Date of death	Place of death
	Pierre-Marie Bourdonnec	June 18, 1859	Ploumilliau, France	July 23, 1905	Tatochilong, Yunnan
	Jean-Baptiste Brieux	February 6, 1845	Bonboillon, France	September 8, 1881	Batang, Sichuan
	Jules Dubernard	August 8, 1840	Ussel, France	July 26, 1905	Tsekou, Yunnan
–	Gabriel Durand	January 31, 1835	Lunel, France	September 28, 1865	Kiona-tong, Yunnan
	Jean-Théodore Monbeig	October 22, 1875	Salies-de-Béarn, France	June 12, 1914	Litang, Sichuan
	Henri Mussot	June 26, 1854	Ouge, France	April 5, 1905	Batang, Sichuan
	Pascual Nadal Oltra	October 30, 1884	Pego, Spain	December 4, 1935	Zainlha, Sichuan
	Epifanio Pegoraro	April 14, 1898	Montecchio Maggiore, Italy	December 4, 1935	Zainlha, Sichuan
	Jean-André Soulié	October 6, 1858	Saint-Juéry, France	April 14, 1905	Batang, Sichuan

== See also ==
- Christianity in Tibet
- Catholic Church in Sichuan
- Catholic Church in Bhutan
- Catholic Church in India
- Catholic Church in Nepal
- Catholic missions
- Islam in Tibet
- Antireligious campaigns of the Chinese Communist Party
- History of European exploration in Tibet
- Category:Roman Catholic missionaries in Tibet
