= Auguste Desgodins =

French missionary

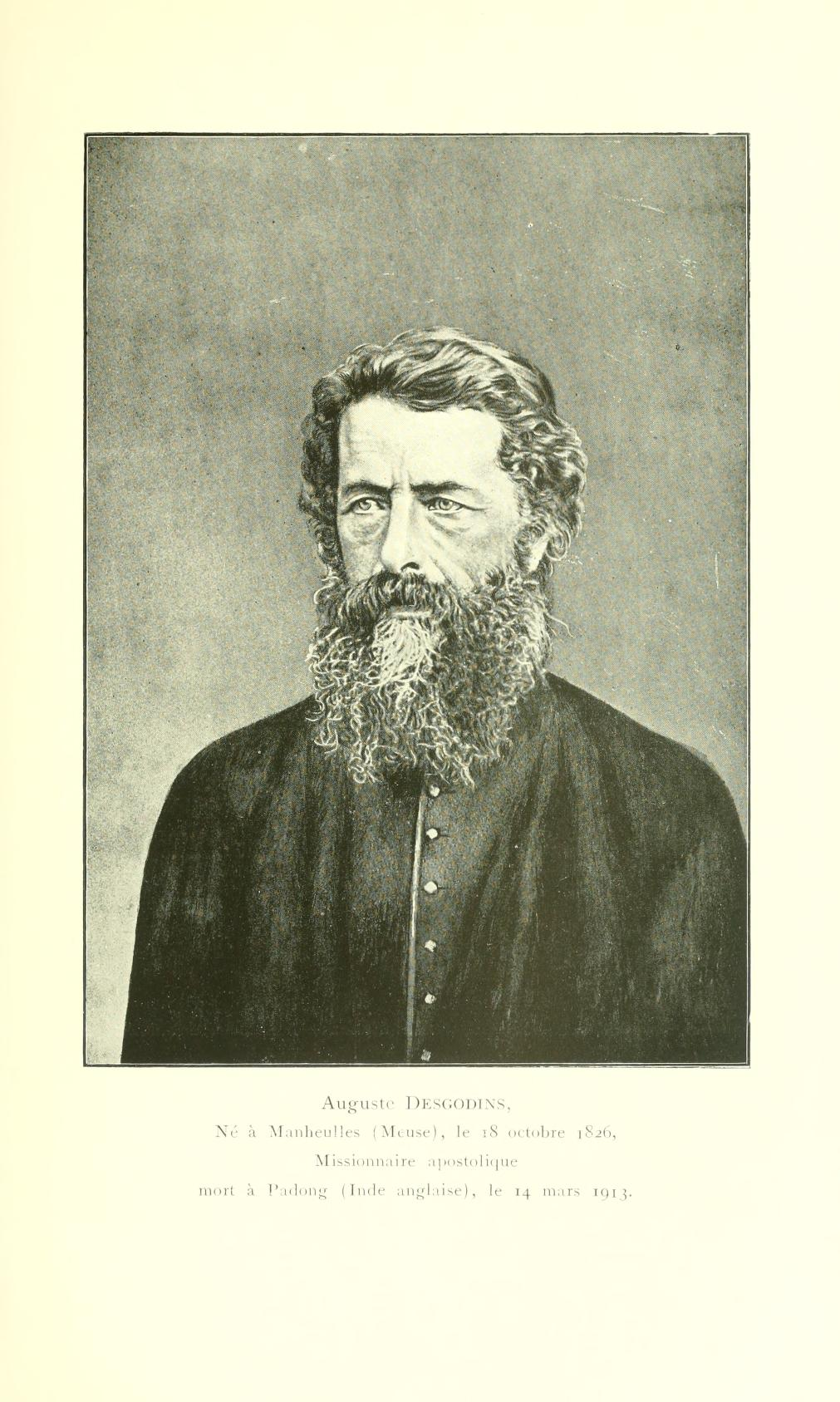
Auguste Desgodins

Auguste Desgodins, MEP (16 October 1826, in Manheulles – 14 March 1913, in Pedong) was a French member of the Paris Foreign Missions Society who attempted to enter into Tibet in the early 1860s.

While both Desgodins and his colleague, the Vicar Apostolic Thomine-Desmazures were granted passports to enter Lhasa, Tibet in 1861 and 1862, they were repelled from the border on multiple occasions. He lived sometime in Darjeeling.

Desgodins published an essay of Tibetan grammar and was a key architect of the development of Tibetan-Latin dictionary French, which was published in 1899.

Along with Felix Biet, he founded in 1865 Our Lady of the Sacred Heart Church of Yerkalo. Auguste Desgodins collected butterflies for Charles Oberthur.

== See also ==
- Catholic Church in Tibet

== Bibliography ==
- Essai de grammaire Thibétaine: pour le langage parlé avec alphabet et prononciation, Imprimerie de Nazareth, 1899
- Dictionnaire Thibétain-Latin-Français: par les missionnaires catholiques du Thibet, Imprimerie de la Société des missions étrangères, 1899
- La mission du Thibet de 1855 à 1870, d'après les lettres de l'abbé Desgodins, Charles H. Desgodins, 1872
- Mémoires, Société académique indo-chinoise (Paris, France), A. Lorgeau, A. Biet, C. E. Bouillevaux, A. de Villemereuil, Eugène Aristide Marre, Léon Feer, G. H. J. Meyners d'Estrey (comte), Auguste Desgodins, L. M. J. Delaporte, J. Depuis, éditeur : Challamel ainé, 1879
