= Maurice Tornay =

Swiss Roman Catholic priest

Blessed Maurice Tornay C.R.S.A.
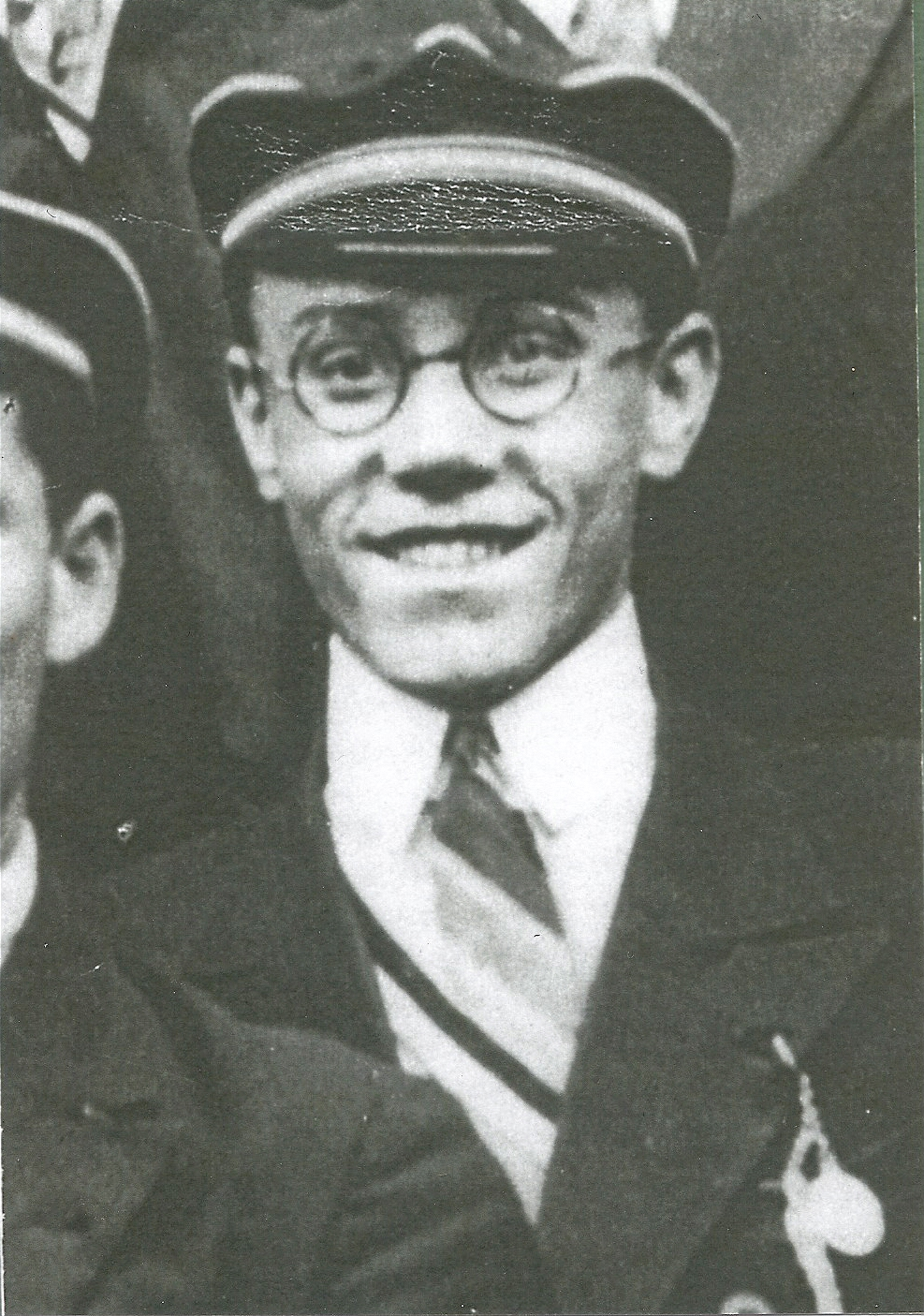
- Maurice Tornay image

Priest
- Born: 31 August 1910; Hamlet of La Rosière, municipality of Orsières, Valais, Switzerland
- Died: 11 August 1949 (aged 38); Cho La, Sichuan, China
- Resting place: Our Lady of the Sacred Heart Church, Yerkalo
- Venerated in: Catholic Church
- Beatified: 16 May 1993, St. Peter's Square, Vatican City by Pope John Paul II
- Feast: 11 August
- Attributes: Augustinian habit
- Patronage: Missionaries; Persecuted Christians

Maurice Tornay, CRSA (31 August 1910 – 11 August 1949) was a Swiss Catholic priest of the Canons Regular of Saint Augustine – of the Hospitallers of Saint Nicholas and Grand-St-Bernard of Mont Joux branch – who served as part of the missions in China and Tibet.

He fought against anti-Catholic religious persecution in independent Tibet and was ambushed and murdered by Tibetan Buddhist monks of the Karma Kagyu sect from the Karma Gon Monastery while he travelled to Lhasa disguised as a pilgrim to appeal directly to the Dalai Lama for religious toleration to be granted to the Catholic Church in Tibet.

He was beatified on 16 May 1993 after Pope John Paul II confirmed that the late priest had been killed "in odium fidei" ('out of hatred of the faith').

== Life ==
Maurice Tornay was born in Valais in Switzerland on 31 August 1910 as the seventh of eight children to Jean-Joseph Tornay and Faustine Rossier. Two sisters were Josephine and Anna while a brother of his was Louis. He was baptized on 13 September 1910 and made his First Communion in 1917.

His childhood saw signs of disposition to a pious life and one based on doing the work of God. On one particular evening his mother told him and his sister Anna of the life of Agnes of Rome. In 1925 he commenced high school at the Abbey of Saint-Maurice d'Agaune and was there until 1931. In his free time he took friends to the chapel where he would read them passages from the works of Francis de Sales and Thérèse of Lisieux's journal. He wrote to a provost to request admittance to the Canons Regular and he was admitted into the novitiate on 25 August 1931.

After a team of missionaries left for China in January 1933 he was disappointed that he did not have his chance to go with them. He was diagnosed with a stomach ulcer in January 1934 and had to follow a special diet – he would skip this diet while in the missions; this also prompted an operation and a subsequent period of rest. He had recovered enough to make his vows on 8 September 1935. In 1936 he requested once more to be assigned to the missions in China – and left alongside Cyrille Lattion (1909–1997) and Nestor Rouiller – and spent a month and a half before arriving in China. In Weixi of Yunnan Province, he completed his theological studies and his studies in local languages. To his brother Louis he sent a letter stating: "I will never return". He and his three companions also underwent courses with a doctor and a dentist.

The path to the priesthood was now open for him and he travelled for over two weeks to Hanoi in Vietnam where he received ordination on 24 April 1938 from Bishop François Chaize; he wrote to his parents: "Your son is a priest!". He then received the task of teaching seminarians in Houa-Lo-Pa. In March 1945 saw him appointed as the parish priest of Our Lady of the Sacred Heart Church at Yerkalo in southeast Tibet. He braved the dangers of the Tibetan Buddhist monks who were not fond of missionaries or of ethnic Tibetan Christians in general.

The local lamas broke into his residence on the morning of 26 January 1946 and confiscated the church while forcing him into exile. He took up brief residence in Pame, China, (with an old drunkard) and learned of the anti-religious situation back in his parish from parishioners who came in through Pame on business. The lamas threatened him with death if he did not break off contact with his old parish while in May 1946 he received a letter from the Governor of Chamado who promised protection and inviting the priest to return to his parish. But on 6 May 1946 he set off though Gun-Akhio stopped him: "Stop! You are forbidden to go further". He asked the Apostolic Nuncio to China Antonio Riberi for his assistance and the latter advised him to meet with the 14th Dalai Lama.

He decided that he would travel to Lhasa to seek an audience with the latter to ask him for an edict of tolerance that would protect the regional Christians. On 10 July 1949 he joined a caravan of merchants and undertook the trip that would last two months and he shaved his beard and put on a Tibetan dress to avoid detection though was recognized during a brief stop. He was forced to leave the caravan though managed to rejoin it and said to his companion Doci: "We must not be afraid ... We will die for the Christians".

Four armed lamas burst from the bush in the Tothong forest which prompted the priest to speak with them: "Don't shoot! Let's talk!" but two shots rang out and Doci was shot dead, on 11 August 1949. His remains were buried though transferred in 1985.

== Beatification ==
The beatification process opened in the two cities of Kangding and Sion in an informative process that opened in 1953 and concluded its business on 31 March 1963 while being titled as a Servant of God at the onset of the process. His spiritual writings received the approval of theologians on 5 January 1965 while an apostolic process was later held; the Congregation for the Causes of Saints validated these processes on 27 April 1990.

The dossier – known as the Positio – was submitted to Rome in 1990 for assessment which allowed for theologians to meet on 28 February 1992 to approve the cause while the cardinal and bishop members followed suit on 16 June 1992. Pope John Paul II approved the fact that the slain priest was killed in hatred of his Christian faith which allowed for the pope to preside over his 16 May 1993 beatification.

The current postulator of the cause is the Rev. Emilio Dunoyer.

== Celebration ==
The official date for the celebration of this Blessed is 12 August. Also, every year on this date, many friends of the Blessed come to La Rosière, the Blessed's birthplace, to celebrate a local mass in his memory.

In 2021, a new chapel and a space recalling his life were dedicated to him inside the church of Orsières.

== See also ==
- Batang uprising
- Catholic Church in Tibet
- Catholic Church in Sichuan
- Diocese of Kangding
