= Ippolito Desideri =

Italian tibetologist

The Reverend Ippolito Desideri SJ
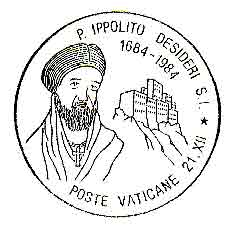

Ippolito Desideri, SJ (21 December 1684 Pistoia, Grand Duchy of Tuscany – 14 April 1733 Rome, Papal States) was an Italian Jesuit missionary and traveller and the most famous of the early European missionaries who founded Catholic Church in Tibet. He was also the first documented Tibetologist and the first European to have successfully studied both Classical and Standard Tibetan.

== Biography ==
Desideri was born in 1684 to a fairly prosperous family at Pistoia, in the Grand Duchy of Tuscany, which was then under the rule of Grand Duke Cosimo III of the House of Medici. Desideri was educated from childhood in the Jesuit school in Pistoia, and in 1700 was selected to attend the Collegio Romano (Roman College) in Rome. From 1706 to 1710, he taught literature at the Jesuit colleges in Orvieto and Arezzo, and later at the Collegio Romano itself.

=== Journey to Tibet ===
His application for the East Indies mission was accepted by the Superior General of the Society of Jesus, Fr. Michelangelo Tamburini, in 1712, and he was assigned to reopen the long dormant Jesuit Mission to Tibet, which remained under the jurisdiction of the Society's Province of Goa. Desideri left Rome on 27 September 1712, and embarked from Lisbon for Portuguese India, arriving at the port of Goa one year later. From Goa he traveled to Surat, Ahmedabad, Rajasthan and Delhi, arriving in Agra (the seat of the Jesuit mission in Northern India) on 15 September 1714. From there he returned to Delhi, where he met his superior and travel companion, the Portuguese Jesuit Manoel Freyre. Together they traveled from Delhi to Srinagar in Kashmir (where they were delayed for six months, and Desideri suffered a nearly fatal intestinal illness), and from Kashmir to Leh, capital of Ladakh, arriving there at the end of June, 1715. According to Desideri, they were well received by the Gyalpo, or King, of Ladakh and his court, and he wished to remain there to found a mission, but he was forced to obey his Superior, Fr. Freyre, who insisted that they travel onward instead into Central Tibet and Lhasa.

They thus undertook a perilous seven months winter journey across the Tibetan plateau; ill-prepared and inexperienced, their very survival was likely due to the help they received from Casal, the Mongol governor (and widow of the previous governor of Western Tibet), who was leaving her post and returning to Lhasa. They journeyed with her armed caravan, and finally arrived in Lhasa on 18 March 1716. After a few weeks, Fr. Freyre returned to India, via Kathmandu and Patna, leaving Fr. Desideri in charge of the mission. He was the only European missionary in Tibet, at that time.

=== Settling down in Lhasa ===
Soon after arriving in Lhasa, Desideri was received in audience by the Mongol Khan of Tibet, Lhasang Khan, who gave him permission to rent a house in Lhasa and to both practice and preach Christianity. After reading Desideri's first work in Tibetan, explaining the basics of Roman Catholic doctrine, Lasang Khan advised him to improve his knowledge of the Tibetan language and to also study Tibetan literature. After some months of intensive study, he entered the Sera Buddhist monastery, one of the three great monastic universities of the politically ascendant Gelukpa sect. There he both studied and debated with Tibetan Buddhist monks and scholars, and was permitted to offer the Tridentine Mass at a Roman Catholic altar in his rooms. He learned the Classical Tibetan literary language (unknown to Europeans before) and became a voracious student of Tibetan literature, philosophy, and culture.

At the end of 1717, he was forced to leave Lhasa due to the unrest caused by the invasion of Tibet by the Dzungar Khanate. He retired to the Capuchin hospice in Dakpo province, in South Central Tibet, although he did return to Lhasa for considerable periods during the period 1719–1720. Between 1718 and 1721, he composed five works in the Classical Tibetan literary language, in which he sought to refute the philosophical concepts of rebirth (which he referred to as "metempsychosis") and Nihilism or 'Emptiness' (Wylie: stong pa nyid; Sanskrit: Śūnyatā), which he felt most prevented conversions from Tibetan Buddhism to the Catholic Church in Tibet. In his books Fr. Desideri also adopted and utilized multiple philosophical techniques from Tibetan literature for scholastic argumentation. Fr. Desideri also used multiple quotations from the dharma and vinaya, and even brought the Scholasticism of St. Thomas Aquinas into a debate with the nihilistic Madhyamaka philosophy of Nagarjuna to argue his case for "the superiority of Christian theology."

=== Conflict with the Capuchins ===
Italian missionaries of the Capuchin Order had been granted the Tibetan mission in 1703 by the Propaganda Fide, the branch of the Church administration that controlled Catholic missionary activity worldwide. Three Capuchins arrived in Lhasa in October 1716, and promptly presented documents to Desideri that they claimed confirmed their exclusive right to the Tibetan mission by the Propaganda. Desideri contested the charge of disobedience to the Propaganda Fide, and both sides complained to Rome. In the meantime Desideri helped his Capuchin co-religionists in acclimating to Tibet. While the Capuchins had no quarrel with Desideri personally, they feared that other Jesuits would follow and displace them from Tibet and Nepal, and they petitioned for his expulsion from the country. In January 1721, Desideri received the order to leave Tibet and return to India. After a long stay in Kuti, at the Tibetan-Nepali border, he returned to Agra in 1722.

=== Later years ===
At Agra, Desideri was appointed head pastor of the Catholic community in the Mughal Empire's capital city of Delhi. He organized education and services for the community, and had a new church built to replace the former dilapidated edifice. In 1725 he went to the French Jesuit Syro-Malabar Church mission in Pondicherry, and set to work learning the Tamil language and carrying on the mission there. In 1727 he was sent to Rome to promote the cause of the beatification of John de Britto, a Jesuit who had died a martyr in South-India. He took along his very extensive notes on Tibet, its culture and religion, and began work on his Relation, which in its latest manuscript was called "Historical Notices of Tibet" (Notizie Istoriche del Tibet) while still homeward bound on a French vessel. He landed in France in August 1727, and after a stay in that country, where he met with important cardinals and aristocrats and had an audience with King Louis XV, he arrived in Rome in January 1728. He took up residence in the Jesuit professed house, and his time was fully occupied in the legal proceedings at the Propaganda Fide between himself, representing the Jesuit order, and Fr. Felice di Montecchio, who fiercely defended the Capuchin case; Desideri wrote three Defenses of the Jesuit position. On 29 November 1732, the Propaganda issued its final terse order on the matter, confirming the exclusive right of the Capuchin Friars to the Tibet mission, and forbidding any further discussion on the subject.

Fr. Desideri had been working during this time on revising the Relation and was preparing it for publication, which, like his return to Tibet, was also forbidden by a direct Propaganda order. While still hoping for the reversal of the order and the opportunity to return to Tibet, Fr. Ippolito Desideri died unexpectedly at the age of only 48-years, in the Collegio Romano on 13 April 1733.

== Legacy ==
Manuscripts of his monumental works in multiple languages, comprising the first accurate account of Tibetan geography, government, agriculture, customs, and Tibetan Buddhist philosophy and religious belief, were buried in the Jesuit archives and a private collection, and did not come to light until the late 19th century; the Relation finally appeared in a complete edition by Luciano Petech which was published in the 1950s. An abridged English translation was published in 1937, and a complete translation appeared only in 2010.

== Main works ==
- "Mission to Tibet: The Extraordinary Eighteenth-Century Account of Father Ippolito Desideri S.J." Trans. by Michael Sweet, Ed. by Leonard Zwilling (Boston: Wisdom Publications, 2010)
- Ippolito Desideri: An Account of Tibet. The Travels of Ippolito Desideri of Pistoia, S.J., 1712–1727. Edited by Filippo De Filippi, with an introduction by C. Wessels, S.J. London: George Routledge & Sons, Ltd. 1932 (The Broadway Travellers)
- Opere Tibetane di Ippolito Desideri S.J. Edited by Giuseppe Toscano (4 vol., 1981–1989)
- Historical Notices of Tibet and Recollections of My Journeys, and the Mission Founded There (Relation), and other works, edited by Luciano Petech (1954–1957, in Petech,"Missionari Italiani nel Tibet e nel Nepal" (Rome: Libraria dello Stato, 1954–57), vols. 5–7.
- "Dispelling the Darkness. A Jesuit's Quest for the Soul of Tibet." Donald S. Lopez Jr. and Thupten Jinpa, Trans. and eds. (Cambridge: Harvard University Press, 2017)
- "When Thomas Aquinas met Nagarjuna: Two Works by Ippolito Desideri, S.J.", Translated and introduction by Guido Stucco. (CreateSpace Independent Publishing Platform, 2016)

== See also ==
- António de Andrade
- Estêvão Cacella
- Johann Grueber
- Bento de Goes
- Catholic Church in Tibet

== Sources ==
- Wessels, Cornelius (1924). Early Jesuit Travellers in Central Asia, 1603–1721. Springer. ISBN 9789401768368.
- Lopez, Donald S. Jr.; Jinpa, Thupten (2017). Dispelling the Darkness: A Jesuit's Quest for the Soul of Tibet. Harvard University Press. ISBN 9780674659704.
- de Filippi, F. (1932). An Account of Tibet: the travels of Ippolito Desideri (1712-1727).
- Petech, L. (1954–57). I Missionari italiani nel Tibet e nel Nepal. Rome.
- Castello Panti, S. (1984). Ippolito Desideri e il Tibet. Pistoia.
- Rauty, N (1984). Notizie inedite su Ippolito Desideri e sulla sua famiglia tratte dagli archivi pistoiesi. Pistoia.
- Luca, A. (1987). Nel Tibet Ignoto. Lo straordinario viaggio di Ippolito Desideri. Bologna.
- Bargiacchi, E.G. (February 2003). "La 'Relazione' di Ippolito Desideri fra storia locale e vicende internazionale". Storia Locale: Quaderni Pistoiesi di Cultura Moderna e Contemporanea: 4–103.
- Bargiacchi, E.G. (2006). Ippolito Desideri S.J. alla scoperta del Tibet e del buddhismo. Pistoia.
- Bargiacchi, E.G. (2007). Ippolito Desideri S.J.: Opere e bibliografia. Rome.
- Sweet, M.J. (August 2006). "Desperately Seeking Capuchins: Manoel Freyre's 'Report on the Tibets and their Routes (Tibetorum ac eorum Relatio Viarum)' and the Desideri Mission to Tibet". Journal of the International Association for Tibetan Studies (2): 1–33.
- Sweet, M.J. "The Devil's Stratagem or Human Fraud: Ippolito Desideri on the Reincarnate Succession of the Dalai Lama" Buddhist-Christian Studies, 29, 2009, 131–140.
- Pomplun, R.T. (2006). "Divine Grace and the Play of Opposites". Buddhist-Christian Studies. 26 (26): 159–163. doi:10.1353/bcs.2006.0021. S2CID 170208259.
- Pomplun, T. Jesuit on the Roof of the World: Ippolito Desideri's Mission to Tibet (New York: Oxford University Press, 2010).
- Michael J. Sweet, An Unpublished Letter in Portuguese of Father Ippolito Desideri, S.J., in AHSI, vol.79 (2010), p. 29
