= Francesco della Penna =

Italian Catholic missionary to Tibet

Francesco Orazio della Penna
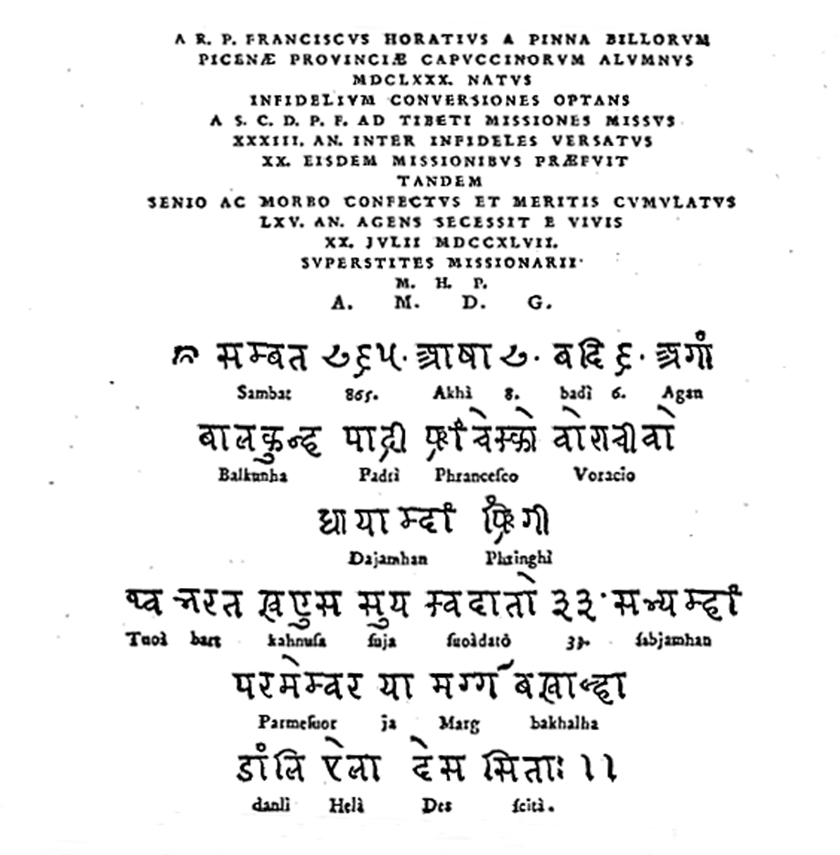
- Epitaph in Latin and Nepal Bhasa on the tombstone of Della Penna who was buried in Patan, Nepal.

Personal life
- Born: Luzio Olivieri; November , 1680 Pennabilli
- Died: July 1745 (aged 64) Patan, Nepal

Religious life
- Religion: Catholic
- Institute: Order of Friars Minor Capuchin

Senior posting
- Period in office: 1700–1745

Francesco Orazio della Penna (1680 – 20 July 1745), born Luzio Olivieri, was a Capuchin missionary to Tibet who became prefect of the Tibetan Mission.

== Biography ==
Born in Pennabilli, Della Penna entered the Capuchin monastery of Pietrarubbia. While he was there, a decree by the Sacra Congregazione di Propaganda Fide declared the establishment of a Catholic mission "in the direction of the source of the Ganges River, towards the kingdom of Tibet." Della Penna was amongst those selected, and he arrived in Lhasa on 12 June 1707. He returned to Rome after the penniless and starving missionaries decided to reorganize their efforts; he returned to Lhasa in 1716. Della Penna studied the Tibetan language and culture at the monastery of Sera under a Lama.

During his stay, Della Penna began composing a Tibetan-Italian dictionary. By 1732, the dictionary contained about 33,000 words. He also translated some important Tibetan works. He translated into Tibetan Bellarmine's Christian Doctrine and Turlot's Treasure of Christian Doctrine. From Tibetan into Italian, he translated the History of the life and works of Shakiatuba, the restorer of Lamaism, Three roads leading to perfection, and On transmigration and prayer to God. A Tibetan printing works was eventually built during Della Penna's stay.

Della Penna returned to Rome in 1736 to seek help and support there. He received it from the Spanish prelate Cardinal Belluga, and Della Penna arrived in Lhasa on 6 January 1741.

Della Penna was well liked in Tibet; he was called the "white head Lama" and was respected for his learning and knowledge of Tibetan culture and language. However, he ran into problems he did not foresee when the seventh Dalai Lama, Kelsang Gyatso, granted him and his fellow missionaries freedom of worship and proselytism. After twenty Tibetan men and women were converted to Christianity, they refused to accept the Dalai Lama's blessing and to take part in the obligatory Buddhist prayers. After a long trial on 22 May 1742, five Christian Tibetans were flogged. Della Penna was given an audience with the Dalai Lama, but the mission's fate was sealed. He set off for Nepal in 1745, but died at Patan on 20 July 1745.

== See also ==
- Catholic Church in Tibet
