= António de Andrade =

Portuguese Jesuit priest and explorer (b. 1580)

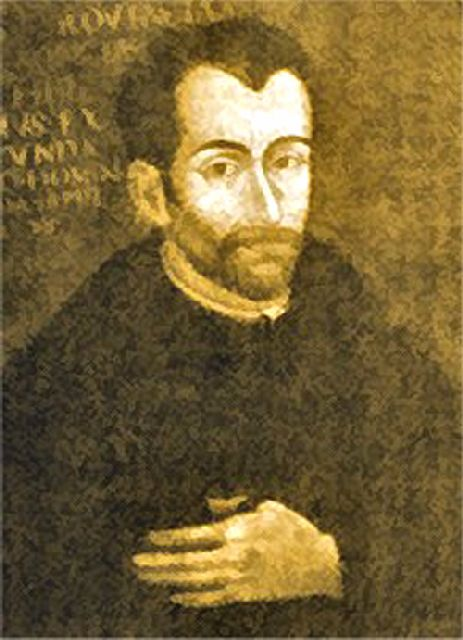
- Born: 1580; Oleiros, Kingdom of Portugal
- Died: 19 March 1634 (aged 53–54); Goa, Portuguese India
- Occupations: Jesuit priest, explorer
- Known for: First European to cross the Himalayas and reach Tibet.

António de Andrade (Tibetan: ཨང་ཋོ་ནཱི་་དྷུ་་ཨང་དྷུ་ཝ་དྷུ།; 1580 – March 19, 1634), also known as António d'Andrade or Andrada, was a Jesuit priest and explorer from Portugal. He entered the Society of Jesus in 1596. From 1600 until his death in 1634, he was engaged in missionary activity in India. Andrade was the first known European to have crossed the Himalayas and reached Tibet, establishing the first Catholic mission on Tibetan soil.

== Life ==
António de Andrade was born in Oleiros, Portugal. In 1600, he went to Goa, the capital of Portuguese India, where he pursued his higher studies and was ordained a priest. He was one of the Jesuits attached to the court of the Mughal emperor Jahangir, and was head of the Jesuit mission in Agra. In 1624, he left Agra for Delhi, where he and the Jesuit brother Manuel Marques joined a group of Hindu pilgrims bound for the temple of Badrinath located in the Northern part of the present-day Indian state of Uttarakhand. Overcoming incredible hardships in the journey, they crossed the Mana Pass to Tibet, the first Europeans known to have done so.

Kindly received in Tibet by the sovereign of the Western Tibetan kingdom of Guge, in the capital city of Tsaparang, Andrade left after less than a month to obtain formal permission for the mission from the Father-Provincial in Goa, and to get funds and other missionaries to accompany him back to Tsaparang. Andrade returned to Tibet in 1625 and was joined by other Jesuit missionaries. They succeeded in building a church and made many converts, aided by support from the king and other members of the royal family. Andrade returned to Goa in 1629; the mission foundered soon afterward, with the invasion of Guge by Ladakh, the death of the pro-missionary king and the installation of a hostile Ladakhi-controlled government in Tsaparang. The missionaries were persecuted or expelled, the Tibetan Christians were sent to Ladakh, and by 1640 the mission, which had begun with so much promise, was over.

Andrade became the Father-Superior of the Jesuit province of Goa in 1630, leaving this post in 1633 and resuming the rectorship of the College of St. Paul. He was also active during this period as a deputy of the Goa Inquisition. He was poisoned on March 4, 1634, and lingered on in agony until dying on March 19. The Inquisition inquiry into his death revealed that he had been murdered by disgruntled Jesuits at the college, possibly supported by powerful enemies among the Goa authorities and merchants. The matter was hushed up and nobody was ever prosecuted for the crime. Later Jesuit accounts portrayed Andrade as a martyr of the faith who was killed because of his zeal as an official of the Inquisition.

Andrade's two extensive accounts of Tibet, written in 1624 and 1626, were published in the Portuguese original in Lisbon in 1626 followed by a Spanish translation in Segovia (Spain) in 1628 and a publication in Kraków (Poland) in the same year, and quickly translated into all the major European languages; they had a significant influence on European knowledge of and attitudes toward Tibet. Modern translations of Andrade's accounts into Italian and French are found in Toscano (1977) and Didier (2002). An English translation of Andrade's writings relating to Tibet was published in 2017 by Sweet and Zwilling.

== Works ==
- Novo Descombrimento do Gram Cathayo ou Reinos de Tibet (in Portuguese), Lisbon, 1626.

== See also ==
- Catholic Church in Tibet
- Portuguese Civil Code of Goa and Damaon

== Bibliography ==
- Cruz, Bruna Dutra de Oliveira Soalheiro (2009), A missão tibetana na correspondência jesuíta (1624–1631), Universidade de São Paulo, doi:10.11606/D.8.2009.tde-21102009-164743.
- Voyages au Thibet Faits en 1625 et 1626, par le Père d'Andrada, et en 1774, 1778 et 1785, par Bogle, Turner et Pourunguir, translated by J.P. Parraud; J.B. Billecoq, Paris, published in the Revolutionary Year 4 (1795 or 1796).
- Desideri, Ippolito. 2010. Mission to Tibet: The Extraordinary Eighteenth-Century Account of Fr. Ippolito Desideri, S.J. trans. Michael Sweet, ed. Leonard Zwilling.
- Didier, Hugues (1999), Os Portugueses no Tibete: Os Primeiros Relatos dos Jesuitas (1624–1635) [The Portuguese in Tibet: The First Relations of the Jesuits (1624–1635)] (in Portuguese).
- Didier, Hughes (1996), Les Portugais au Tibet [The Portuguese in Tibet] (in French), Paris: Chandeigne.
- Esteves Pereira, Francisco (editor). 1924. O Descobrimento do Tibet pelo P.Antonio de Andrade. Coimbra: Imprensa da Universidade.
- Sweet, Michael J. Murder in the Refectory: The Death of António de Andrade, S.J. Catholic Historical Review, 102, no.1, 2016, pp. 26–45.
- Sweet, Michael J. (trans. and intro) and Leonard Zwilling (ed.). 2017 More than the Promised Land: Letters and Relations from Tibet by the Jesuit Missionary António de Andrade (1580-1634). Boston: Institute of Jesuit Sources/Boston College.
- Tavares, Célia Cristina da Silva. 2006. Jesuítas e Inquisidores em Goa. A Cristianidade Insular (1540-1682).
- Toscano, Giuseppe. 1977. Alla Scoperta del Tibet.
- Wessels, C. (1924). Early Jesuit Travellers in Central Asia 1603–1721. The Hague..
