= Susanna Carson Rijnhart =

Canadian medical doctor, Protestant missionary and Tibetan explorer

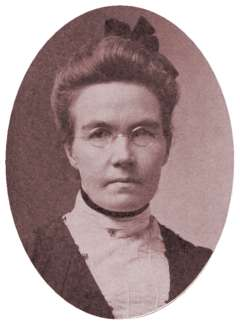
- Born: 1868; Chatham, Ontario, Canada
- Died: 1908 (aged 39–40); Chatham, Ontario, Canada
- Other name: Susie Carson
- Education: Trinity College, Toronto
- Occupations: Missionary, explorer, physician
- Spouses: Petrus Rijnhart (m. 1894; disappeared 1898) James Moyes (m. 1905)

Susanna "Susie" Carson Rijnhart, (later Moyes, 1868 – 1908) was a Canadian medical doctor, Protestant missionary, and Tibetan explorer. She was the second Western woman known to have visited Tibet, after Annie Royle Taylor.

== Early life and marriage ==
Susie Carson was born in 1868 in Chatham, Ontario. At the age of twenty she graduated from Trinity College in Toronto as a medical doctor. She and her sister, Dr. Jean Carson, were the first women physicians admitted to practice from Western Ontario. Susie spent six years in private practice in Ontario. She joined the Methodist church at the age of sixteen, and became active in both Methodist and non-Methodist organizations such as Epworth League and Christian Endeavor. She later worked for the Disciples of Christ.

In 1894 she met Petrus Rijnhart, a Dutch-born former missionary with the China Inland Mission. Rijnhart had worked in the Netherlands for the Salvation Army but was sent to Canada in 1886 to avoid charges of sexual assault. He eventually made it to China and worked for three years with the CIM. He was dismissed by CIM in 1893 as an ‘imposter” after stirring up “Rijnhart’s hornet’s nest." A charismatic speaker, he was lecturing in Canada and soliciting financial support to return to China and work in Tibet when he met Susie. The couple was married in September 1894 in Hiram, Ohio, and before the end of the year departed Canada for China. Unlike most missionaries, they were independent, not representatives of any missionary organization. Apparently, however, the funds they had raised in Canada were adequate for their expenses. Independent missionaries were often criticized as loose cannons, more likely to cause trouble than to achieve progress in the goal of making China a Christian country.

== On the borders of Tibet ==
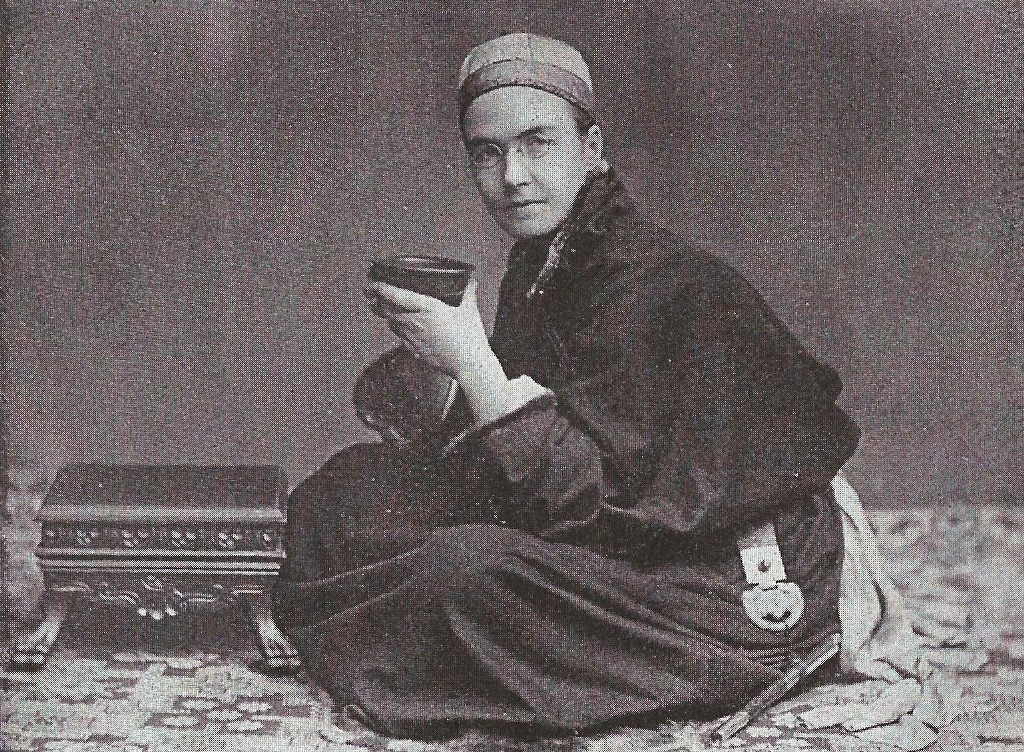
Dr. Susie Rijnhart in Tibetan dress.

In mid-1895, the Rijnharts and their colleague, William Neil Ferguson, arrived at their destination of Lusar, a small village servicing the Kumbum, one of the largest and most important Tibetan Buddhist monasteries. Kumbum was home to about 3,600 monks. Ferguson parted ways with the Rijnharts after a few months and their nearest Western neighbors were missionaries in Xining, seventeen miles away. The immediate objective of the Rijnharts was to learn Tibetan and work among the Tibetans. Their ultimate ambition was to reach Lhasa, the remote and forbidden capital of Tibet, unvisited by Westerners since 1846. In 1896, a revolt broke out among the Muslim population and Kumbum was in danger of being overrun. Susie and her husband were invited by the monastery to tend to the wounded and sick and subsequently invited to reside at the monastery. Petreus became a friend and confidant of the abbot of the monastery, according to Susie.

In late-summer 1896, the Rijnharts moved to the trading town of Tankar (simplified Chinese: 丹噶尔古城; traditional Chinese: 丹噶爾古城), about 24 miles from Kumbum, to open a medical dispensary. The British traveler, Montagu Sinclair Wellby, passed through Tankar in October 1896 and gave a favorable view of the Rijnharts and their good relations with Chinese officials. They lived a "hard life" dependent upon the small sums they charged for medical services at their dispensary. Petrus left Susie alone in Tankar for several months while he acted as a guide and interpreter for Wellby. In November Susie was visited by explorer Sven Hedin who passed through Tankar. He described Susie as a “bareheaded young lady wearing spectacles and dressed after the Chinese manner…Through her medical knowledge and skill, Mrs. Rheinhard [sic] had won several friends among the native population.” Shortly after Petreus returned, the couple had a son, Charles Carson, born June 30, 1897.

== The attempt on Lhasa ==
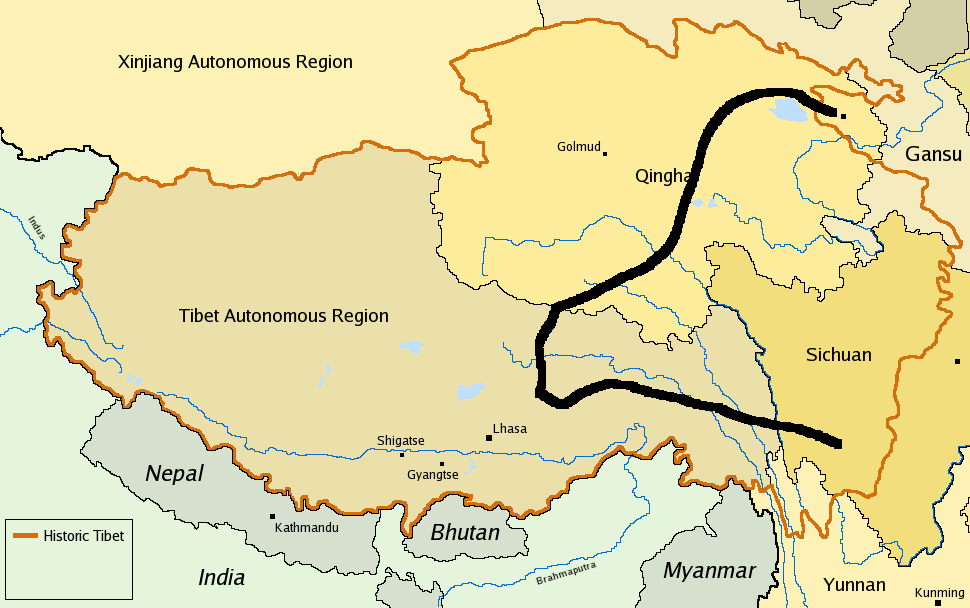
Susie Rijnhart's route in 1898, starting in the north and ending in Kangding

The Rijnharts, baby Charles, and three local hired men, two Chinese and one Muslim, left Tankar on horseback, May 20, 1898. Their destination was Lhasa, eight hundred miles away as the crow flies but across a series of mountain ranges through passes at elevations of up to 5,000 metres (16,000 ft). They carried with them food and other supplies sufficient for two years as well as several hundred bibles translated into Tibetan. Following a known caravan route to Lhasa, they skirted the Tsaidam and proceeded southwest, roughly following the track a modern highway follows today.

All went well for more than two months until their two Chinese hired men deserted. Shortly thereafter, on August 11, five of their pack animals were stolen. On August 21, the baby Charles died suddenly. They were at this time just north of the district capital of Nagchu, 14,850 feet (4,530 m) in elevation. As they continued Tibetan soldiers tried to persuade them to abandon their quest and return the way they had come. A Tibetan official in Nagchu refused to allow them to continue to Lhasa, only 100 miles further south, or to remain in Nagchu, but insisted they leave Tibet via a caravan route leading to Kangding (Tachienlu), 600 miles to the east. Their reliable Muslim guide departed at this time, with their permission, to journey to his home in Ladakh and they were left alone at the mercy of the Tibetans.

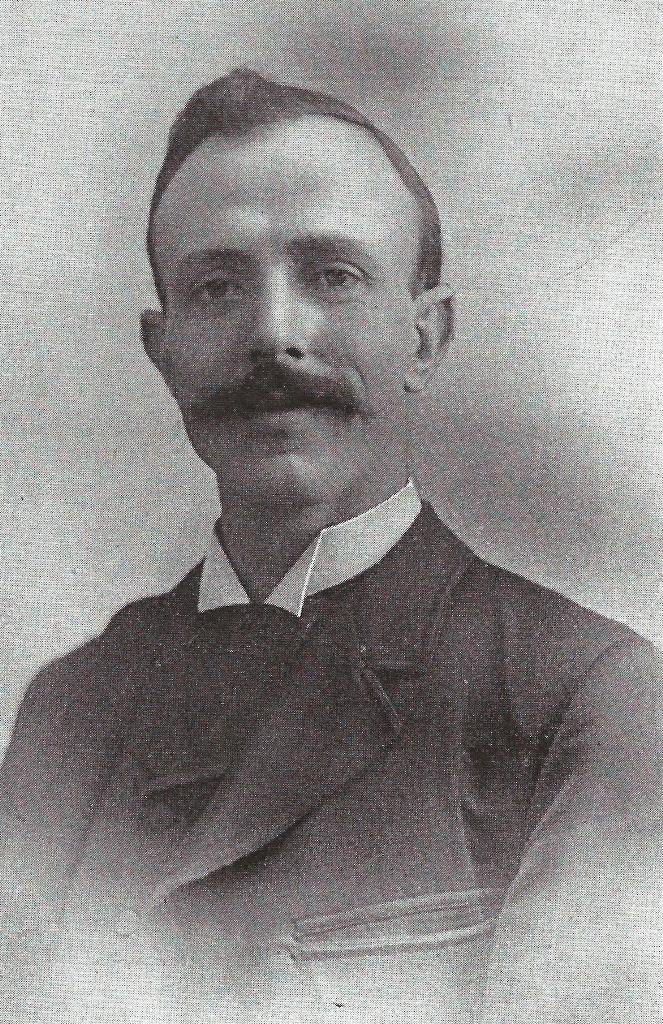
Petrus Rijnhart, 1866-1898.

On September 6, in a snow storm, with three guides provided by the Tibetan government, the Rijnharts departed Nagchu on the "tea road" east. On September 17 their little caravan was attacked by bandits. One of their guides was wounded and all their horses except three were stolen. Their guides deserted and they were left alone. They abandoned most of their goods and continued. On September 26, Petrus left Susie behind to seek help from Tibetans camped on the other side of a river. She never saw her husband again. She was left with a revolver and a supply of silver bullion, the currency of the area.

Susie engaged guides to accompany her on the road, but they proved faithless. She threatened them with the revolver to prevent being raped and robbed. She finally arrived at Gyegu (Jyekundo), rested a few days, and there negotiated a passport from the Abbot of a monastery. She then proceeded onwards, crossing a series of mountain ranges, partially on foot and alone, but mostly with an escort of local guides. She arrived in Kangding penniless, in rags, and with frost-bitten feet on November 26, 1898. Kangding at that time was the most remote outpost of Christian missionaries in China. She asked the way to the house of the China Inland Mission and there she introduced herself to missionaries Edward Amundsen and James Moyes, who would later become her second husband.

== Later life ==
Investigations by the British and Dutch government uncovered no information concerning the fate of Petrus Rijnhart and in 1900 Susie returned to Canada. She wrote a book about her experiences and lectured, and in 1902 returned to China, this time to Kangding (Tachienlu), a city on the Sichuan-Tibetan border, with the Foreign Christian Missionary Society. In 1905 she married James Moyes. Because of her former husband’s dismissal from the CIM, Moyes had to resign from the CIM to marry her. Her health failed, and she was replaced by Zenas Sanford Loftis at the Tibetan mission. In 1907 she and her husband returned to Canada. She had a baby, a son, in January 1908 and died on February 7, 1908, in Chatham. James Moyes returned to China in 1911 and in 1915 was working for the American Bible Society in Nanking.

== Importance ==
Dr. Susie Rijnhart typified the independent and adventurous women, often missionaries, who were beginning to travel the world and practice a variety of professions. Her attempt to reach Lhasa seems to have been as much an adventure gone wrong as it was a Christian pilgrimage. Her book makes no mention of any converts to Christianity the couple made during their four years in China and Tibet. How familiar she was with her first husband’s unsavory past is unknown.

== Literature ==
- Rijnhart, Susie Carson (1902). With the Tibetans in tent and temple; narrative of four years' residence on the Tibetan border, and of a journey into the far interior (2nd ed.). Edinburgh: Oliphant, Anderson & Ferrier. OCLC 1476009083.
- Harrison, Thomas Perrin (November 21, 1901). "Review: With the Tibetans in Tent and Temple". The Baltimore Sun. p. 8.

== See also ==
- Christianity in Tibet
- Protestantism in Sichuan
- Cecil Polhill
- Albert Shelton
- Theo Sørensen
- History of European exploration in Tibet
