= Zenas Sanford Loftis =

American physician

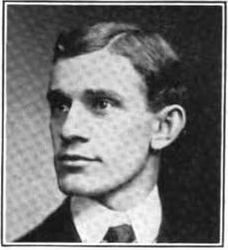
- Photo of Loftis in "The History of the Foreign Christian Missionary Society."
- Born: May 11, 1881; Gainesboro, Tennessee, United States
- Died: August 12, 1909 (aged 28); Sichuan, West China
- Resting place: Batang Mission Cemetery; Latitude: 30.00200, Longitude: 99.10526
- Other name: Lo E Sen (Dr. Lo) Z.S. Loftis
- Education: Vanderbilt University
- Scientific career
- Fields: Medicine, Missionary

Zenas Sanford Loftis (11 May 1881 - 12 August 1909) was an American physician who worked briefly as a medical missionary in Batang, a largely Tibetan town in Sichuan Province of West China. His photography and published diary contained accounts of culture, religious traditions, and the geography of China and Tibet.

Albert Shelton, the head of the Batang mission, wrote that Loftis "was a man who loved all the beauties of nature and was able to see God on every hand." He believed that Loftis would be a capable replacement for him when he and his family went on furlough to the United States. Upon arrival in June 1909, Loftis accepted the responsibility of the mission's dispensary until his death two months later from typhus fever and smallpox.

== Early life ==
Zenas Sanford Loftis was born in Gainesboro, Tennessee as the son of James H. Loftis and Nancy Eveline Loftis. The Loftis family moved onto a farm in rural Kansas when Loftis was seven years of age and later moved to central Texas where Zenas developed his skills in photography and the printer's trade. In 1894 Loftis became a Christian and soon after began his involvement in his local church. When Loftis was 18, his father died from health complications with paralysis. He entered Vanderbilt University a year later in the Department of Pharmacy and graduated in 1901 while winning the prestigious Founders' medal.

== Missionary work ==
=== Calling ===
Loftis's calling to the life of a medical missionary came about in St. Louis while performing slum mission work and teaching Chinese Sunday-school. He was inspired by the work of Susanna Carson Rijnhart whose husband and child died while on an expedition in Tibet. In response to this calling, Loftis moved to Nashville, Tennessee to earn a medical degree within Vanderbilt University's Department of Medicine. Throughout his studies, Loftis prayed to God "that he might be sent to the most difficult and needy field in all the world" and "wanted to go where no one else was willing to go." In 1906, Loftis was sent by Vanderbilt University to the Southern Student's Y.M.C.A conference in Asheville, North Carolina where Loftis first heard of plans to establish a mission in Batang.

=== Appointment ===
In 1903, Dr. Susanna Carson Rijnhart, Dr. Albert Shelton, and his wife, Flora Shelton, were sent by the Foreign Christian Missionary Society (FCMS) to open a mission in Tibet. However, in 1907 Rijnhart departed due to health problems. After learning of Rijnhart's departure from the mission on the border of Tibet, Loftis applied for and was appointed to the mission in Batang by the FCMS in January 1908.

=== Journey ===
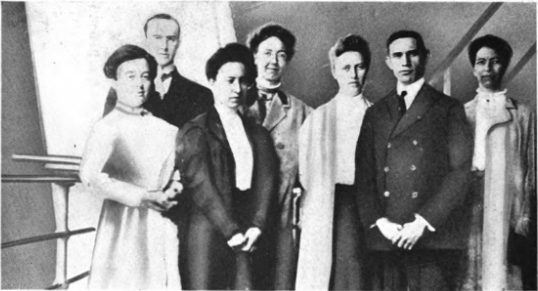
Loftis (second from right) aboard the SS Mongolia

Loftis's route from the United States to Tibet required that he make stops at San Francisco, Honolulu, Yokohama, Nagasaki, Shanghai, and Nanjing. After reaching Nanjing, Loftis had to travel up the Yangtze River, pass through Hankou, Yichang, Chungking, Luchau, Kiating, Tachienlu, and Litang to reach Batang.

He boarded the SS Mongolia on September 15, 1908, and left the United States, never to return. He wrote in his diary that he felt "no sorrow in [his] heart" as the country held "all that was dear to [him] except [his] work.

==== Experience of Chinese and Tibetan culture ====
As he traveled through China and eastern Tibet, Loftis recorded his observations of the cultural landscape, providing context to many of the customs and historical landmarks that he encountered. On the way to Nanjing, he described the "thousands of graves" that covered the fields and detailed the cultural and historical context behind the "great stone statues" that lay along the road that he traveled. Along the Yangtze River, Loftis observed an "artificial cave" home to an ancient "aboriginal race" and entered one of them, concluding that they were "the first dwellings" of Tibetan ancestors. He also recorded histories of the Purple Mountain, Omei Shan, and a bridge that hovered over the Tong River.

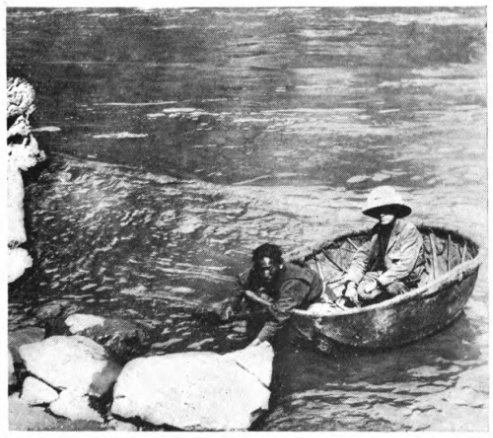
Loftis in a coracle

Loftis said that the religious icons of the Tibetan people were numerous, and described "shrines with many prayer wheels and idols." He listened to the "chanting prayers of lamas" and looked at "devout Tibetans" whirling "prayer drums ... thus offering millions of prayers in one second." Loftis stumbled upon one prayer drum with "some half million or more written mani prayers."

Loftis was a harsh critic of the Tibetan people's Buddhist traditions. He wrote, "It struck chills to my heart when I saw these deluded wretches groping so blindly in the dark for help from a higher power." Loftis visited the large Litang monastery and its Holy Temple. He interacted with an abbot in Litang who was said to be "a Living Buddha" and from whom Loftis learned about the Kangyur.

Loftis also highlighted the major health hazards found throughout the country. He stated in his diary that they did not "know what a sewer is, so everything that is waste [was] thrown into the streets." He described a Chinese as having "four verminous beds" with "inevitable foul smelling pits of human refuse. Conditions were similar in Tibet where Loftis encountered inns that were "dirty and foul beyond belief." Along the Yalong River, he described an inn which had "cracks in the walls" that were "filled with their eggs and larva" in addition to the presence of "bedbugs, fleas, and lice."

Loftis also criticized the "superstitious" nature of the Chinese. One night "they make a lot of noise with drums and gongs all night to keep the devils off." As he was traveling up the Yangtze River, he writes that the "Chinese believe the river to be infested with devils." Loftis characterized himself as a "foreign devil" as a crowd was staring as he ate his food with "knives and forks."

==== Healthcare ====
Loftis visited the Christian missions that he passed by on the way to the Batang mission, and wrote about their progress and conditions. He noted that many of the stations were "terribly undermanned" and regretted that "he could not multiply himself into a hundred" to aid the missions.

He also treated patients along the way to Batang. On the road, he treated a man who attempted to commit an opium suicide and was received with "profuse thanks" for his work. While traveling up the Yangtze River, he diagnosed and remedied a case of malaria, allowing him the opportunity to "make a demonstration of the power of foreign medicine." In Yachow, he treated a case of opium in a young girl. Near one of the Tibetan villages, he alleviated the pain of a "contused and swollen" sclera conjunctiva." In Tachienlu, he performed an amputation on part of a finger.

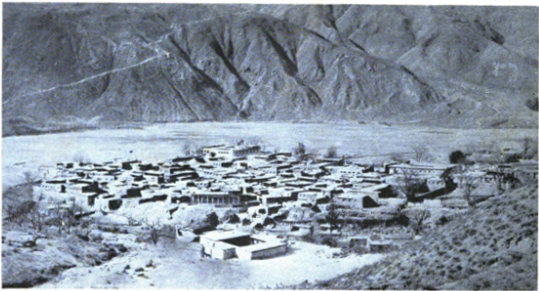
Batang

=== Batang mission ===
Loftis reached the Batang mission on June 17, 1909, after a journey of ten months from his home in the United States to Batang. He was welcomed at the mission by Dr. Albert Shelton and James Ogden and their wives.

Albert Shelton left the responsibility of the mission's dispensary to Loftis while Shelton and Ogden were on an extended trip south of Batang. Loftis treated patients around the area in whatever capacity was needed including attending to dislocations, opium overdose, tuberculosis, skin lacerations, pediatrics, and smallpox. Loftis noted that the Tibetan people "knew nothing about dislocations," and a man with a dislocated shoulder whom Loftis had treated "praised the skill of the foreign doctor." He treated "between five and six hundred people."

== Death ==
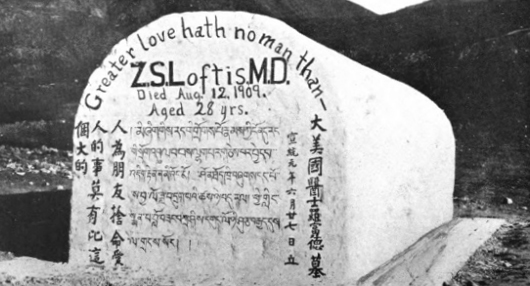
The grave of Zenas Sanford Loftis

Not long after Loftis's arrival at the Batang mission, he told his colleagues that he was not feeling well. Dr. Albert Shelton noted that Loftis had attended to two patients with smallpox and suspected that Loftis may have caught the disease. Although Loftis was vaccinated, his condition gradually worsened. Shelton observed that his smallpox "was raging everywhere." Loftis inherited Typhus fever while battling smallpox, which only exacerbated his condition. Unable to obtain a vaccine, Shelton isolated himself with his colleague until Loftis perished at the age of 28 at four o' clock one afternoon.

Loftis was buried next to the grave of William Soutter, a Christian missionary. Loftis's grave faces the road to Lhasa, the capital of Tibet. Engraved on his grave is the quote, "Greater love hath no man than this, that a man lay down his life for his friends." In addition, the third stanza from the poem Break, Break, Break by Alfred, Lord Tennyson is written in English, Tibetan, and Chinese on Loftis's tomb.

== Legacy ==
The other missionaries in Batang named Loftis Memorial Hospital in his honor. Dr. William M. Hardy replaced Loftis, and more missionaries followed over the next 20 years. In 1932, the missionaries abandoned Batang due to tensions and violence between Tibet and China, a lack of funds, and internal dissention in the mission.

When Loftis reached Sanba en route to the Batang mission, he came across the grave of the Christian Missionary William Soutter. After seeing the grave, Loftis wrote in his diary, "O my Master, if it is Thy will that I fill a lonely grave in this land, may it be one that will be a landmark, and an inspiration to others, and may I go to do it willingly, if it is Thy will." His desires manifested themselves postmortem as the Foreign Christian Missionary and other organizations used Loftis's story in their published literature to recruit medical missionaries. His observations of China and Tibet were a contribution to the knowledge of the western world about a remote region.

== Publications ==
- Loftis, Z. S. (1911). A Message From Batang: The Diary of Z. S. Loftis, M.D. Missionary to Tibetans. New York: Fleming H. Revell Company.

== See also ==
- Christianity in Tibet
- Protestantism in Sichuan
- Edvard Amundsen
- Cecil Polhill
- Theo Sørensen
- Annie Royle Taylor
