= Mary Wills =

Mary Wills may refer to:

- Mary Wills (costume designer) (1914–1997), American costume designer
- Dame Mary Wills (1861–1931), English philanthropist
- Mary Jo Wills (born 1951), U.S. ambassador
- Mary Ann Wills (1859?–1942), New Zealand artist
