= Cecil Polhill =

British missionary

Cecil Henry Polhill
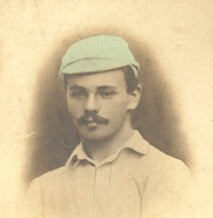
- Born: Cecil Henry Polhill-Turner; 23 February 1860; Bedfordshire, England
- Died: 9 March 1938 (aged 78); Hampstead, London, England
- Education: Eton College; Jesus College, Cambridge
- Occupation: Missionary
- Spouse: Eleanor Agnes Marston
- Parents: Frederick Polhill-Turner (father); Emily Frances Barron (mother)
- Relatives: Arthur Twistleton Polhill (brother)

Cecil Henry Polhill, formerly Cecil Henry Polhill-Turner (23 February 1860 in Bedfordshire – 9 March 1938 in Hampstead, London) was a British Anglican missionary and Pentecostal leader.

== Early life ==
Cecil Henry Polhill was born on 23 February 1860, second son of Frederick Polhill-Turner and Emily Frances Barron. He was educated at Eton College and Jesus College, Cambridge, before taking a commission as a Second Lieutenant in the Bedfordshire Yeomanry. In 1885 he and his brother, Arthur Twistleton Polhill, became affiliated with the China Inland Mission (CIM) as part of the Cambridge Seven missionary band. They left London for western China on 5 February 1885. The Polhills studied local language in Hanzhong, southwest Shaanxi, then in 1887 moved into the neighbouring province Sichuan (formerly spelt Szechwan). Cecil Polhill was at first based at the provincial capital, Chengdu, and the eastern Sichuanese city Chongqing, but he felt drawn towards the people of Tibet.

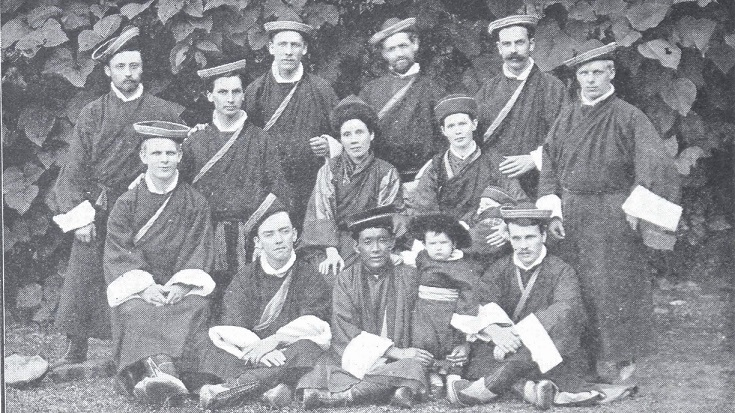
Annie Royle Taylor's "Tibetan Pioneer Band" in Tibetan dress, of which Polhill assumed the leadership; c. 1894.

In 1894, at Annie Royle Taylor's suggestion, Polhill assumed the leadership of her Tibetan Pioneer Mission, whose members included Edvard Amundsen and Theo Sørensen. Under his guidance, the mission band continued their work in British Bhutan and on the Sino-Tibetan border. After helping with mission work in Kalimpong, India in 1896, he moved to Tatsienlu, a Khams Tibetan city west of Sichuan, where he established a missionary station along with other four CIM missionaries in 1897, which paved the way for the future construction of the Gospel Church of Tatsienlu. He returned from China in 1900 in the wake of the Boxer Uprising.

== Christian evangelism ==
Upon his return from China, Polhill inherited a fortune from his uncle Sir Henry Page-Turner Barron, 2nd Baronet, and spent much of his life donating to missionary causes. In 1908 Polhill visited Azusa Street, Los Angeles, where he had a Pentecostal experience. Before returning to England Polhill wrote a cheque for £1500 to pay off the mortgage on the Azusa Street building. After returning to England Polhill attended Alexander Boddy's first Sunderland Convention, and helped Boddy fund his Pentecostal periodical Confidence. Polhill became the first President of the Pentecostal Missionary Union (PMU), and administered it along China Inland Mission lines. In 1925 the Executive Council of the PMU voted to merge with the British Assemblies of God, and so Polhill, an Anglican, resigned aged 65. He maintained friendly relationships with the PMU, and missionaries in the field.

== Personal life ==
In 1888, he married Eleanor Agnes Marston, and their marriage produced six children, three daughters and three sons.

== Death ==
He died on 9 March 1938 Hampstead, London, England.

== See also ==
- Anglicanism in Sichuan
- Christianity in Tibet
- Zenas Sanford Loftis
- Susanna Carson Rijnhart
- Albert Shelton
