= Albert Shelton =

American missionary

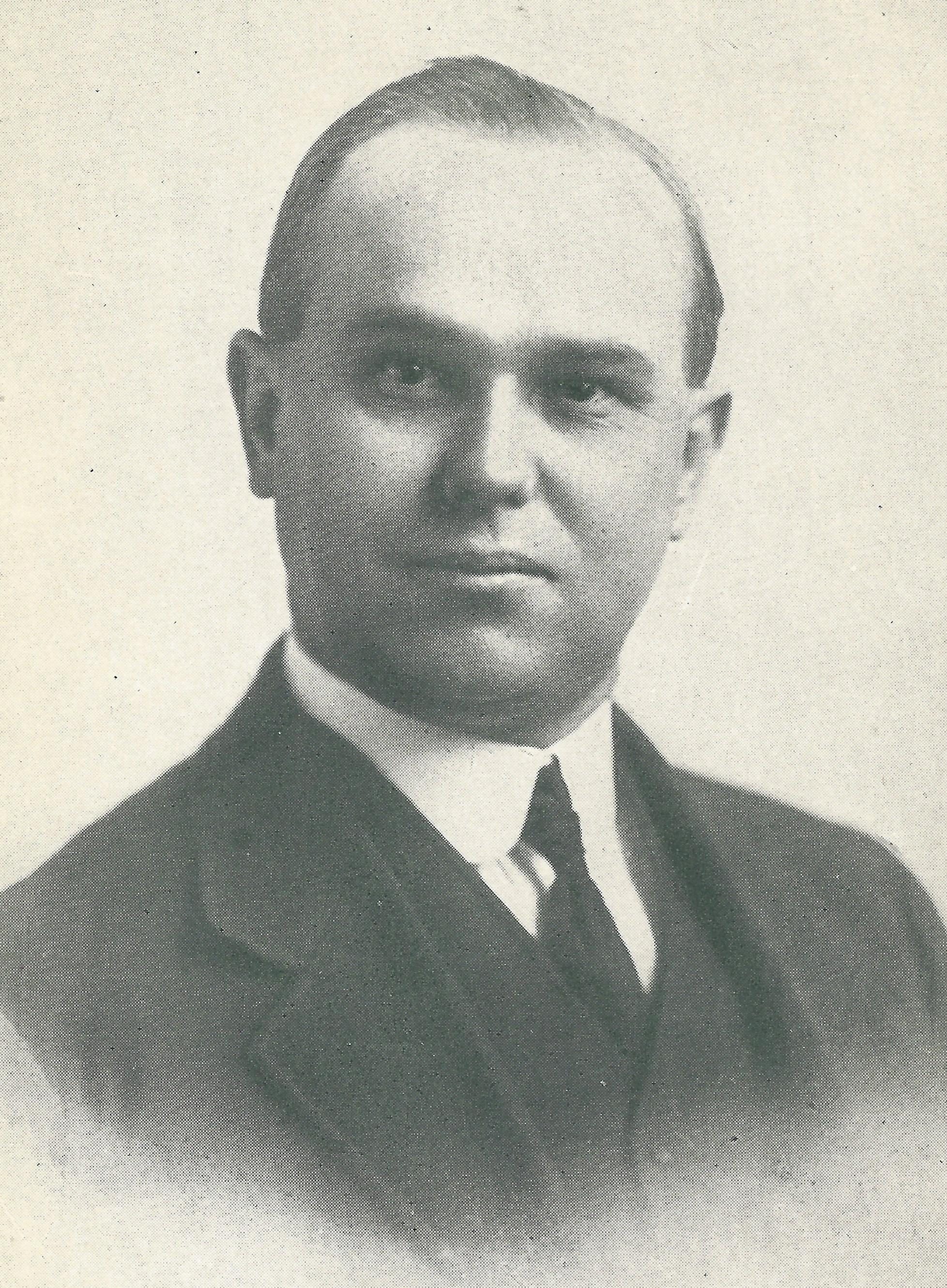
- Born: Albert Leroy Shelton; June 9, 1875; Indianapolis, Indiana, United States
- Died: February 17, 1922 (aged 46); Batang, Sichuan, Republican China
- Cause of death: Murdered
- Education: Emporia State University; University of Kentucky
- Occupations: Missionary, author
- Spouse: Flora Beal Shelton (m. 1899)
- Children: Dorris Shelton Still and Dorothy Madelon and Albert L Shelton Jr
- Parents: Joseph O. Shelton (father); Emma Rosabelles Belles (mother)

Albert Leroy Shelton (1875-1922) was an American medical doctor and a Protestant missionary in Tibet, especially in Batang in the Kham region of eastern Tibet, from 1903 until 1922. He authored a popular book about his experiences and collected Tibetan cultural items and sold them to museums. He was shot and killed by brigands in 1922 while traveling by mule near Batang.

== Early life and family ==
Shelton was born 9 June 1875 in Indianapolis, Indiana to Joseph O. Shelton, a carpenter, and Emma Rosabelles Belles. In 1880 the family moved to a farm in Bourbon County, Kansas, in 1884 to Harper County, Kansas, and in 1892 to Grant County, Kansas on the Great Plains of western Kansas. He married Flora Flavia Beal (b. 28 September 1871) on 27 April 1899.

Shelton attended Emporia State University in Emporia, Kansas and studied medicine at the University of Kentucky, graduating in 1903. That same year he was appointed as a missionary to China by the Foreign Christian Missionary Society (FCMS) of the Disciples of Christ denomination. He was ordained as a minister in San Francisco prior to his departure for China by ship on 29 September 1903.

The Sheltons had three children: Dorris Shelton Still, born 25 August 1904 in Kangding, China; and twins Dorothy Madelon and Albert Leroy Jr., born 17 November 1907 in Anthony, Kansas.

== Advancing the mission frontier ==
The Sheltons traveled to China with medical doctor Susanna Carson Rijnhart, who had attempted to visit Lhasa, Tibet in 1898. Her husband and infant child died in that attempt.

On arrival in China, the Sheltons and Rijnhart traveled up the Yangtze River by boat, foot, and horseback through the rugged eastern ranges of the Himalayas reaching the frontier trading center of Kangding, then called Tachienlu, on March 15, 1904.

In 1908, the Sheltons and another missionary family, the Ogdens, established a mission at Batang, a town of 350 Tibetan families, in the Kham region of Tibet, a seventeen-day overland journey westward from Kangding. Theirs was the first Christian mission to be established in Batang. In 1909 medical missionary Zenas Sanford Loftis joined the Sheltons and Ogdens, but he perished from smallpox two months after his arrival.

Shelton was an indefatigable traveler via muleback who utilized his medical knowledge to gain access to both Chinese and Tibetan officials and to ensure his welcome throughout the region. Kham was a battleground between China, attempting to gain control of the area, and the Khampa Tibetans resisting the Chinese.

== Lecturer and vender of Tibetan curios ==
In 1910, the Shelton family returned to the U.S. on furlough. It took 89 days for them to travel from Batang to San Francisco. Shelton brought home with him a collection of Tibetan art and curios which he sold to the Newark, New Jersey museum for $2,000 (more than $60,000 in 2020 dollars). He spoke extensively across the United States in a fund-raising campaign for the expansion of the overseas FCMS's missions and achieved the status of a "missionary-hero". His wife, Flora, published her first book, Sunshine and Shadow on the Tibetan Border. The Shelton's return to China was delayed until 1913 by war and chaos in Kham. They returned to Batang in July 2014 along with two other FCMS missionary families, the Ogdens and the Hardys. The missionaries financed the construction of a large comfortable compound in the small Tibetan town in which they lived and worked. Shelton continued to take photographs and collect Tibetan art to sell to museums. He also treated a great variety of patients, including Chinese soldiers wounded in fighting with Tibetans. He traveled widely over a large area. The Shelton family became "Tibetanized" in many ways. Shelton was abducted by brigands in early 1920 and held prisoner for about two months before being rescued.

== Back to the United States ==
Shelton and his family returned to the US in 1920. He was now a famous man, touted by the FCMS as a hero for his travels and his exploits in a war torn land. National Geographic magazine published an article by him, "Life among the People of Eastern Tibet", in 1921 and his book Pioneering in Tibet was published in the same year. He had continued collecting Tibetan art and artifacts and sold them and his photographs to the Newark Museum for more than $4,000—about triple the average yearly salary of a minister in the United States. The museum held a special exhibition of his Tibetan items. He had dinner with John D. Rockefeller and sold his wife some Tibetan jewelry.

== Death ==
Shelton returned in Batang in late 1921. His wife accompanied him to China, but did not continue on to Batang. Their two children remained in the U.S. for school. Shelton's objective was to establish missions deeper into Tibet, ultimately to travel to Lhasa, but initially to Markam Gartok (called "Gatuo Town" today). On February 16, 1922, en route to Markam, he was ambushed by brigands a few miles outside Batang. He died of a gunshot wound the next day and was buried in Batang.

After Shelton's death, the FCMS mission in Batang disintegrated because of internal dissension and closed in 1932.

== Legacy ==
Shelton's book Tibetan Folk Tales was published posthumously in 1925. Flora Shelton published several additional books about Tibet.

Shelton, in the words of his biographer, was "a man who craved both adventure and social esteem; a doctor who practiced medicine intermittently; a missionary who seldom preached; a devout family man who endangered himself and his family in a perilous post."

== Published works ==
- Shelton, Albert L. (1921). Pioneering in Tibet: A Personal Record of Life and Experience in Mission Fields. New York: Fleming H. Revell Company.
- Shelton, A. L. (1921). "Life Among the People of Eastern Tibet". National Geographic Magazine. Washington, D.C.: National Geographic Society.

== See also ==
- Christianity in Tibet
- Protestantism in Sichuan
- Edvard Amundsen
- Cecil Polhill
- Theo Sørensen
- Annie Royle Taylor
