= Rubie Drummond-Nairne Warner =

Rubie Drummond-Nairne Warner (1886–27 December 1977), known also by her marital name Mrs. Somerset, was a pioneer female scholar of medieval English and Old Norse.

== Early life ==
Warner was born in 1886 to William Redston Warner, a resident of Marlow, Buckinghamshire; she had a younger brother, Douglas (1887–1916), who died in the First World War. Rubie's parents died before she turned ten.

Rubie attended Bedford High School, before proceeding to Lady Margaret Hall at the University of Oxford, under its principal Elizabeth Wordsworth. She studied 1905–7, interrupted her studies for a year due to illness, and resumed them in 1908–9, taking a third-class honours B.A. in English; Charles Lock has inferred that she would have gained a higher classification had her health been better. In her final year, she specialised in philology and Icelandic, studying with Arthur Napier and William Craigie. She was unable formally to graduate due to Oxford's prohibition at the time against women graduating.

== Career ==
In 1909–10, Warner worked as an assistant to the Oxford legal historian Paul Vinogradoff, enjoying financial independence for the first time. In the summer of 1910 she visited Iceland and long maintained Icelandic-language correspondence with her former hosts there. In January 1911 she began teaching as an assistant lecturer at Queen’s University, Belfast, which had recently received independent university status, through the invitation of A. O. Belfour (1883–1975), whom she had studied alongside at Oxford. Her first students included Helen Waddell, with whom she formed a lifelong friendship. At Queen's she was also to meet another lifelong friend, Maude Clarke. Initially, her employment was precarious, and she spent much of her time at home in England. In the academic year 1913–14 she visited Germany; Charles Lock remarks that "it took some courage for an English lady to travel, apparently unaccompanied, through an already hostile Germany".

With A. O. Belfour's mobilisation as a corporal in the First World War, Warner was appointed in November 1914 to the role of deputy lecturer at Queen's, acting as Head of English Language, a position she held until 1919 (at which time she was the university's highest paid woman), when Belfour resumed the role and Warner was made redundant.

In 1915 she was admitted for a BLitt at Oxford, initially under Napier (who died in 1916), which led to her 1917 Early English Text Society publication though, in the event, no qualification. However, Queen's awarded her an MA degree—the only degree from which she formally graduated—at the time of her departure in 1919.

In 1919–20 she became an Assistant Tutor at St Hilda's College, Oxford, but was unable to secure a further position, partly because of her marriage in 1921. She nonetheless continued to teach undergraduates privately from her home at Oxford until her husband's retirement in 1945.

== Family life ==
In 1921 Warner married the Bodleian librarian William Horace Boscawen Somerset (1880–1946), whom she had met when she engaged him to teach her ancient Greek in an effort to bolster her job prospects. The couple had a son and a daughter, FitzRoy Douglas Boscawen Somerset (1923–) and Helen Jane Boscawen Somerset (1925–).

== Major publications ==
- Early English Homilies from the Twelfth-Century M.S. Vespasian D. XIV, Early English Text Society, Original Series, 115 (London: Early English Text Society, 1917)
- Some Important Points in Historical English Grammar (Oxford: Blackwell, 1928).
