= Susette Taylor =

English polyglot and world traveller

Susette Taylor's 1909 anthology The Humour of Spain.

Susette or Suzette Martha Taylor (1860 – 1920) was an English polyglot and academic.

== Early life and education ==
She was born on 20 September 1860 in Norwood, Surrey, to shipping director John Taylor and his wife Carolina, née Folkes. Her nine siblings included the missionary Annie Royle Taylor. She was educated at King's College, London and read modern languages at Lady Margaret Hall, Oxford, in 1884–1886. She studied languages in Spain, Russia and Greece, gaining a baccalaureate in Spanish language and literature from the University of Barcelona in 1890. She worked as a language teacher at Kensington High School and Frances Holland School.

== Career and travel ==
An extensive traveller, Susette visited Canada, Australia, Fiji, Japan, North Africa and Burma, as well as visiting her sister in Tibet. She published travel articles and translations, mostly from Russian and French. In 1909 she published The Humour of Spain, a collection of extracts from Spanish literature between the twelfth and nineteenth centuries.

When the Royal Geographical Society began admitting women fellows in 1913, Susette was elected to a fellowship that year, being seconded by David Hogarth.

During World War I, she used her linguistic skills in the office of the Censor of Foreign Correspondence and in the Geographical Section of the Foreign Intelligence branch of the Navy.

== Death and legacy ==
She died on 28 January 1920 in Kensington, London, leaving 800 of her books in French, Spanish and Catalan to the Lady Margaret Hall Library. The college also offered a Suzette Taylor travelling scholarship in her name: past recipients include Dorothy Wrinch, Helen Waddell, and Myra Shackley.
