= Gospel Church, Kangding =

Gospel Church
- Kangding Christian Church
- 福音堂/福音講堂 康定基督教堂
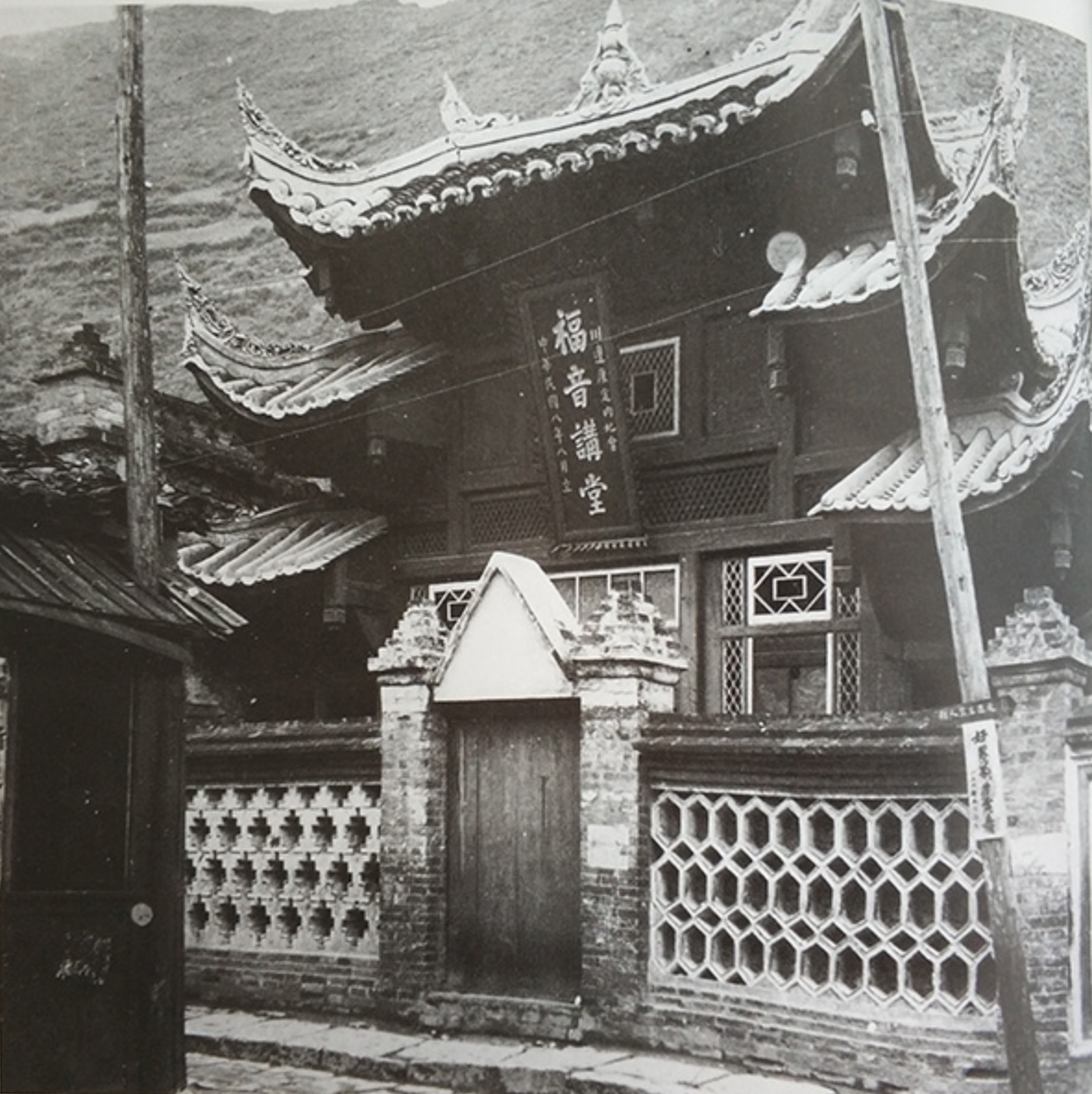
- The original Gospel Church in 1939
- Location: 44 Guangming Road, Kangding, Garzê Tibetan Prefecture, Sichuan (former church building situated on Shaanxi Street)
- Country: China
- Denomination: Three-Self Church (Protestant)
- Previous denomination: Unknown (belonging to China Inland Mission)

History
- Status: Church
- Founded: 1897
- Founder: Cecil Polhill et al.

Architecture
- Functional status: Active
- Style: Sichuanese architecture (old church building); Pseudo-Gothic (new church building)
- Groundbreaking: 1905 (old church building); 1995 (new church building)

Gospel Church, (Note: Chinese: 福音堂; pinyin: Fúyīn táng; Wade–Giles: Fu^{2}-yin^{1} tʽang^{2}; Sichuanese romanization: Fu^{5} In^{1} Tʽang^{2}.) today known as Kangding Christian Church, (Note: Chinese: 康定基督教堂; pinyin: Kāngdìng Jīdū jiàotáng; Sichuanese romanization: Kʽang^{1}-tin^{4} Chi^{1}-tu^{5}-chiao^{4}-tʽang^{2}.) is a Protestant church situated on Guangming Road, Kangding, a county-level city in Garzê Tibetan Prefecture, Sichuan Province. First built in 1905, on Yanhe West Road, by China Inland Mission missionaries, the church was relocated to its present location in 1958. It has been subjected to the control of the state-sanctioned Three-Self Patriotic Church since 1954.

== History ==
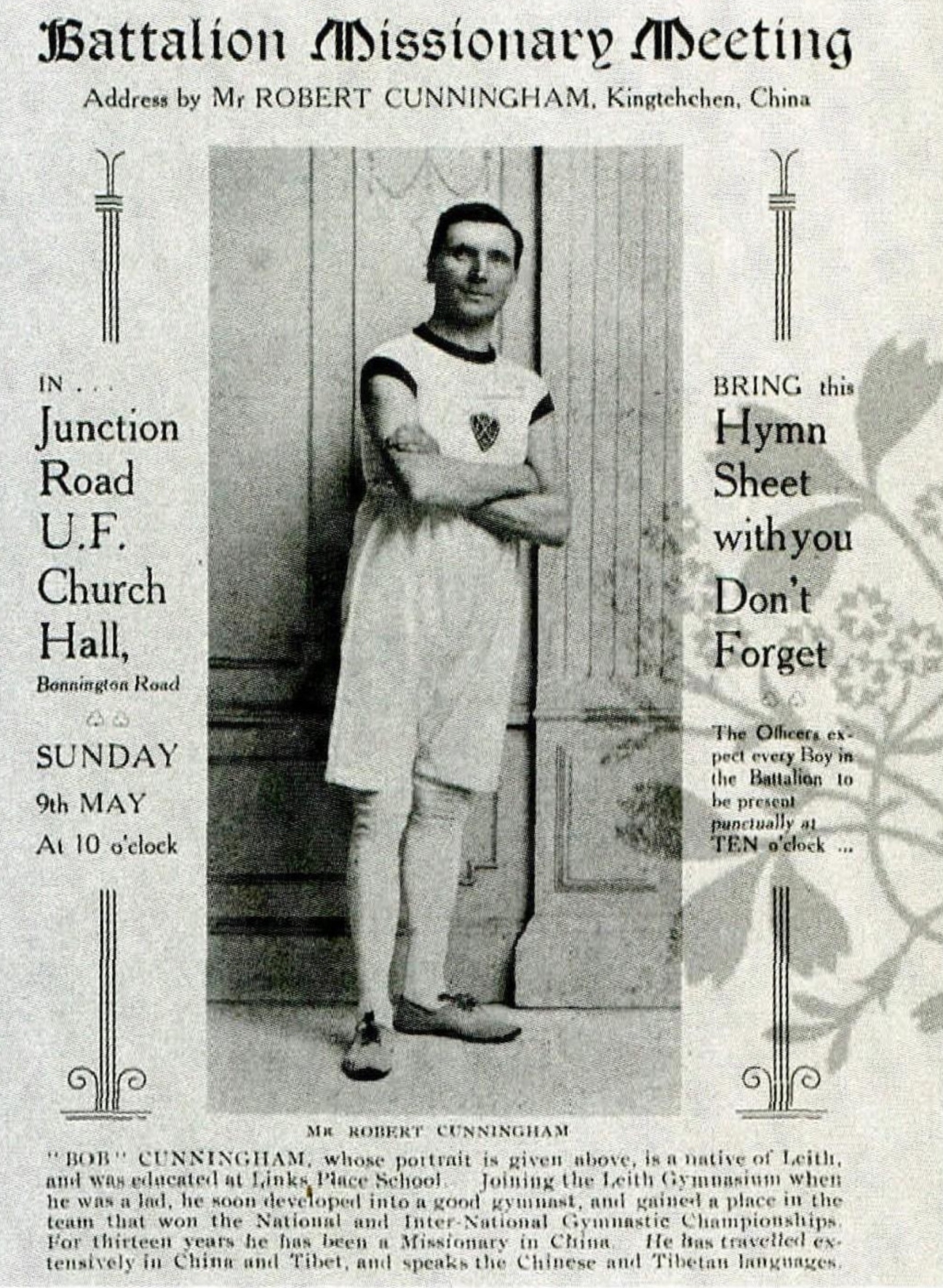
Robert Cunningham, the Leith-born CIM missionary who had served as pastor for thirty-five years in the Gospel Church.

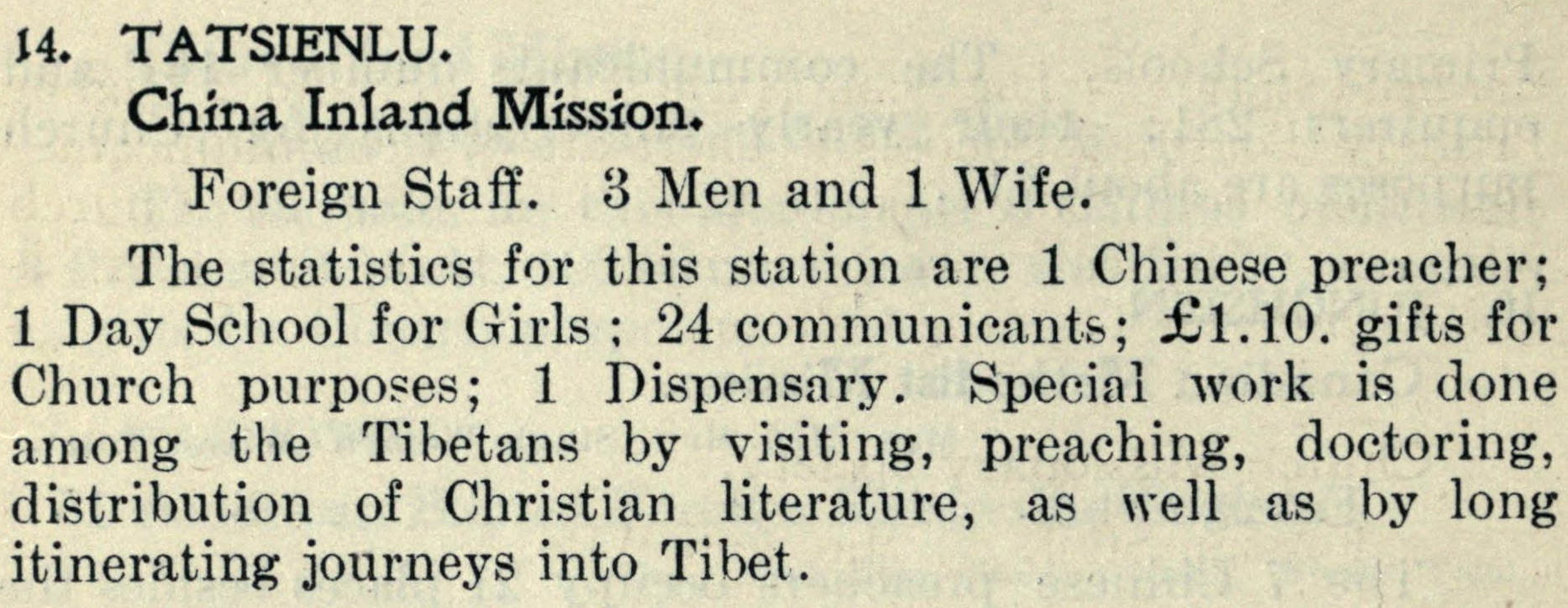
Survey of China Inland Mission's mission work in Tatsienlu, published in 1913.

In 1897, five missionaries of the China Inland Mission (CIM), including Cecil Polhill, began work in Kangding (then known as Tatsienlu, Tachienlu, or Dartsedo in Tibetan), making it a base for work in Tibet.

In 1905, James Huston Edgar (1872–1936), an Australian-born New Zealand CIM missionary, arrived in Kangding and established the traditional Sichuanese-style Gospel Church. Apart from a vertical board inscribed with its name — Gospel Church (福音講堂, lit. 'Gospel Lecture Hall' or 'Lecture Hall for Evangelisation'), the building is hardly distinguished from any Buddhist or Taoist temple at the time.

Two years later (1907), Robert Cunningham (1883–1942), a Scottish ex-gymnast turned missionary, was sent to Kangding by CIM as Edgar's assistant, who was going to serve as the pastor of the church until his death in 1942. 'Even the Archbishop of Canterbury can not dwell in contemplation and prayer day and night', Cunningham introduced some Western games to the Tibetans, tiddlywinks, ludo, halma and snap, the remit is to 'evangelise in an entertaining way'. He also published numerous articles on the study of Khams Tibet in The West China Missionary News and Journal of the West China Border Research Society.

After the communist takeover of China in 1949, Christian Churches in China were forced to sever their ties with respective overseas Churches, which has thus led to the merging of Gospel Church into the communist-established Three-Self Patriotic Church. In 1958, the church was relocated to its present location. The old church building was demolished shortly after, in order to support a city construction project.

In 1995, Gospel Church was rebuilt with white bricks in a pseudo-Gothic style, and renamed Kangding Christian Church. It is quite a humble building surrounded by residential blocks. Apart from its gable topped by a cross, the church could be easily overlooked.

== See also ==
- Christianity in Tibet
- Protestantism in Sichuan
- Edvard Amundsen
- Theo Sørensen
- Diocese of Kangding
