= Dorris Shelton Still =

American author

Dorris Evangeline Shelton Still (25 August 1904 – 29 April 1997) was an American author. She wrote the book Sue in Tibet, a semi-biographical work about growing up in Tibet. She was born in Kangding, in the Kham region of Tibet.

== Biography ==
She was the eldest daughter of Albert Shelton (1875–1922), an American missionary, who was stationed in the remote border town of Batang between 1908 and 1921. Batang was part of the Kham region of eastern Tibet.

In 1921, she and her sister were sent off to boarding school in the United States. Her father was shortly afterwards killed by bandits in a raid. She would never again visit Tibet.

Like her father and mother, she wrote a book about life in Tibet. Her book, titled Sue in Tibet, was published later in the 1930s or 40s. It was a rare book in its time, in that the main character and heroine of the adventures was a girl. In her 1942 review for The New York Times, Anne Eaton considers the book "a spirited, well-told story that girls from 10 to 14 will enjoy."

Shelton Still would later engage herself in Tibetan causes and also met the 14th Dalai Lama.

In 1989, Beyond the Devils in the Wind, her account of her father's life and mission, was published.
