= Maude Clarke =

Irish historian

- Born: Maude Violet Clarke; 7 May 1892; Belfast, Northern Ireland
- Died: 17 November 1935 (aged 43); Carnmoney, County Antrim

Academic background
- Education: Alexandra College
- Alma mater: Queen's University Belfast; Lady Margaret Hall, Oxford

Academic work
- Discipline: History
- Sub-discipline: England in the Middle Ages; Political history
- Institutions: Queen's University Belfast; Somerville College

Maude Violet Clarke (7 May 1892 – 17 November 1935) was an Irish historian.

== Early life and education ==
Maude Clarke was born in Belfast on 7 May 1892. She was the only daughter of Richard James Clarke, rector of Trinity church, Belfast, and Anne Nugent Clarke (née Jessop). She had three brothers. The family moved to Coole Glebe, Carnmoney, County Antrim in 1903. She attended school in Belfast, with her father teaching her Latin and Greek at home. It was during this time that she met her lifelong friend, Helen Waddell. From 1905, Clarke was educated at Alexandra College, Dublin, matriculating at Queen's University Belfast (QUB) in 1910 taking a first-class honours degree in history. She won the first scholarship by examination for Lady Margaret Hall, Oxford in 1912, going on to graduate with a first in modern history in 1915.

== Career ==
She filled the vacancy left by F. M. Powicke at QUB from 1916 to 1919, before returning to Oxford to take a position as a history tutor at Somerville College. She became a Fellow in 1922, and the Vice-Principal in 1933. Her first publication was a paper on the Irish parliament during the reign of Edward II, which was read to the Royal Historical Society in December 1925. Her first book, The medieval city, followed in 1926. Around this time she started her research into Richard II, from which she produced the article "The Lancastrian faction and the wonderful parliament", read at the International Historical Congress in Oslo in 1928.

Working with Vivian Hunter Galbraith, Clarke published an edition of the Dieulacres Chronicle in 1930 on the subject of the deposition of Richard II. Clarke was developing an interest in iconography at this time, attracting high praise for her article on the Wilton diptych in 1931, whilst she was studying Irish high crosses. She partnered with Noël Denholm-Young to work on an edition of the Kirkstall Chronicle, and a paper on "Forfeitures and treason in 1388". During this period she started a study of the "Modus tenendi parliamentum", which is considered her most important work. It was published posthumously under the title Medieval representation and consent in 1936.

Clarke continued to work after a diagnosis of cancer, dividing her time between Oxford and periods of rest in Carnmoney. Her last article was "The origin of impeachment" in 1934. She didn't, however, live to produce, as intended, the volume on the 14th century for the Oxford history of England. Clarke died in Carnmoney on 17 November 1935.
