= Arthur T. Polhill =

English missionary

Arthur Twistleton Polhill
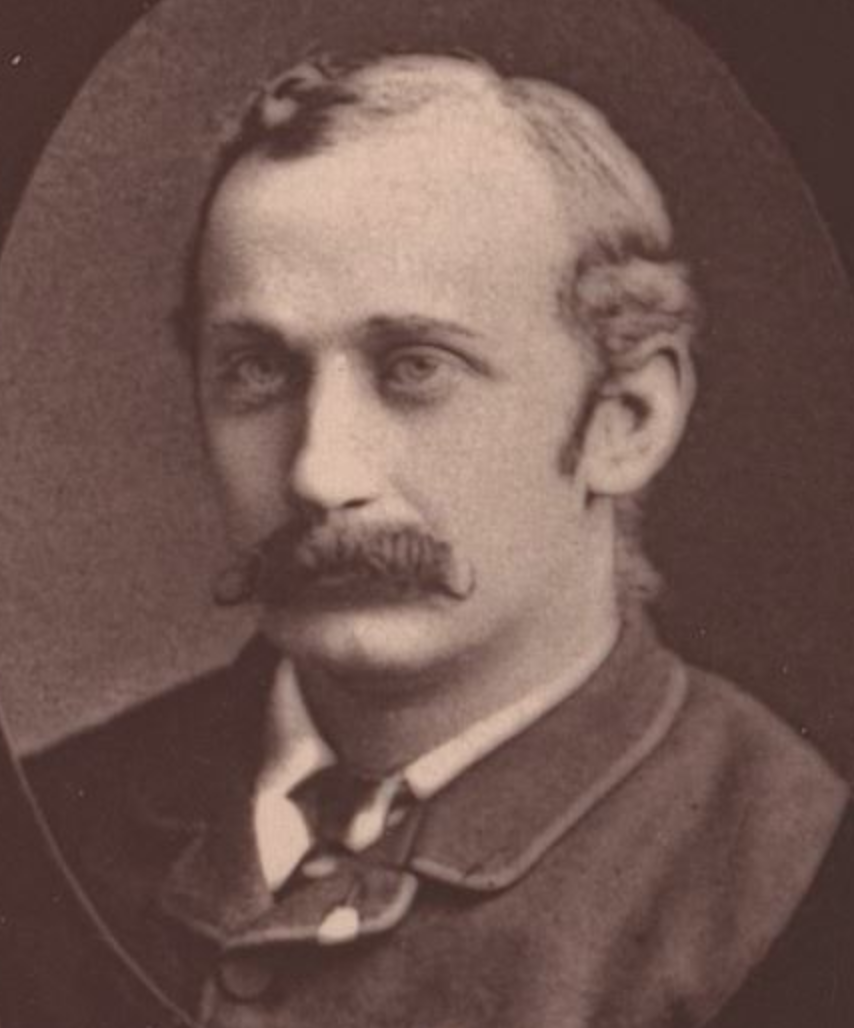
- Arthur T. Polhill-Turner in 1886
- Born: Arthur Twistleton Polhill-Turner; 7 February 1862; Bedfordshire, England
- Died: 21 November 1935 (aged 73)
- Education: Eton College; Trinity Hall, Cambridge
- Occupation: Missionary
- Spouses: Alice Drake (m. 1888; died 1907) Agnes Augusta Hart (m. 1908)
- Parents: Frederick Polhill-Turner (father); Emily Frances Barron (mother)
- Relatives: Cecil Henry Polhill (brother)

Arthur Twistleton Polhill (7 February 1862 – 21 November 1935), born Arthur Twistleton Polhill-Turner (the name Turner was discarded in 1902 by deed poll), was an English Anglican missionary. He was one of the Cambridge Seven, seven young men from England that travelled to China in order to continue Hudson Taylor's missionary work there.

== Early life ==
Arthur Polhill-Turner was born on 7 February 1862. His mother was Emily Frances Barron, daughter of Sir Henry Barron, 1st Baronet.

He was educated at Eton College and Trinity Hall, Cambridge.

== Christian evangelism ==
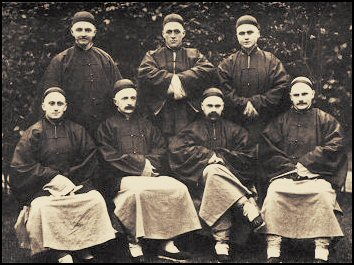
The Cambridge Seven in Qing-dynasty mandarin clothing

In November 1882, Polhill-Turner was deeply moved by the American evangelist Dwight L. Moody’s talks to Trinity students. Recognizing the seriousness of following Christ, he only decided to follow him after thoroughly thinking through the implications of such a decision. At that time, he was studying law, but changed to theology at Ridley Hall, Cambridge. He was the first of the Cambridge Seven to have the inkling that China was for him, and soon after his decision to follow Christ he began to pursue this desire with intensity, convincing a few of the others to join him. In 1885 he and his brother, Cecil Polhill, became affiliated with the China Inland Mission (CIM). Their sister Alice also travelled to China as a missionary.

Initially signed up with the Church Missionary Society (CMS) before switching to the CIM, Arthur, now an ordained Anglican, retained a strong connection to the CMS even though he was technically a CIM missionary. He left for western China (Sichuan, formerly spelt Szechwan) on 5 February 1885. Together with Montagu Proctor-Beauchamp and William Cassels, the three established a proper Church of England diocese in Szechwan.

He spent ten years in Bazhong between 1888 and 1898, before relocating to Dazhou in 1899. On 23 February 1904, construction of a large multi-purpose Gospel Hall, or Gospel Church (Chinese: 福音堂; pinyin: Fúyīn táng) started in Dazhou, under the supervision of Arthur, and was complete by August. A number of outstations were established following the building's completion.

== Publications ==
Two Etonians in China (with Cecil Polhill)

== Death ==
He died on 21 November 1935.

== See also ==
- Anglicanism in Sichuan
