= Otto Kyllmann =

Otto Kyllmann (died 1958) was a publisher and senior director of Constable & Co from 1909 until 1950.

== Personal life ==
Kyllmann's first wife was Victoria Mary Louise Adelaide Cunliffe-Owen, sister of Dame Mary Wills, but they were divorced and she remarried in 1919. His second marriage also ended in divorce.

He enjoyed a close relationship with scholar/writer Helen Waddell, several of whose books were later published by Constable, where Kyllmann had helped Waddell obtain employment.

== Professional activities ==
Besides Waddell, Kyllman's literary protégés included George Bernard Shaw, May Sinclair and Marie Corelli. A collection of Kyllmann's correspondence, dated between 1900 and 1957, is held by Queen's University, Belfast., having been donated by Waddell's niece after her aunt's death.

It was Kyllmann who, in 1949, rejected a proposal for an edition of George Meredith's poems from Siegfried Sassoon, saying it showed "signs that you were tired and under the weather". When the result was that Sassoon completely abandoned the project, Helen Waddell commented on Sassoon's "anemone-shrinking sensitiveness".
