= Helen Waddell =

Irish poet

Helen Jane Waddell (31 May 1889 – 5 March 1965) was an Irish poet, scholar, theological novelist, translator, publisher's reader and playwright. She was a recipient of the Benson Medal. A biography of her by the Benedictine nun Dame Felicitas Corrigan was published in 1986, winning the James Tait Black Award.

== Biography ==
=== Personal life ===
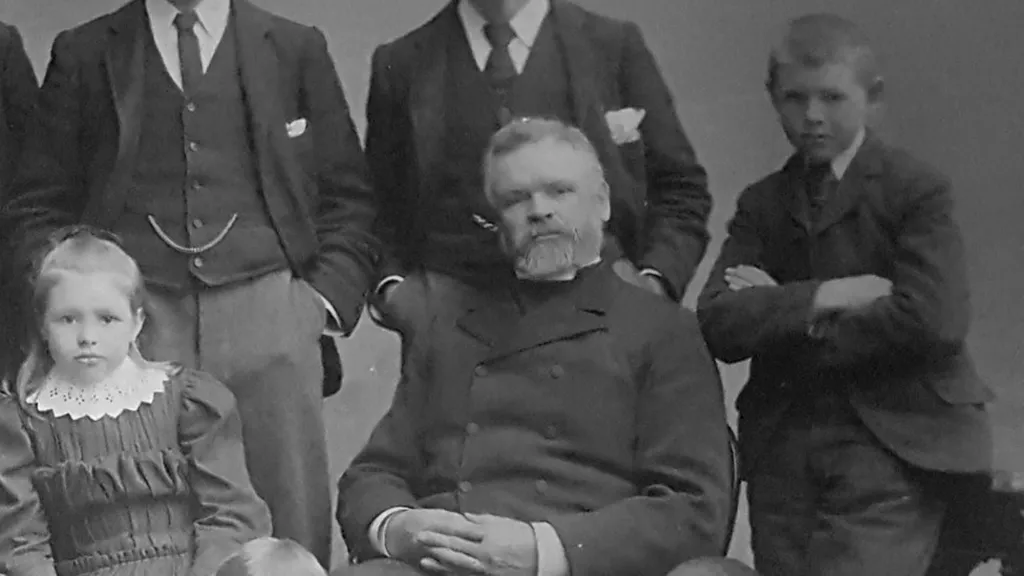
Helen Waddell and her brother with her father and Hugh Waddell

Waddell was born in Tokyo, the tenth and youngest child of Hugh Waddell, a Presbyterian minister and missionary in Tokyo. Her mother, Jane Martin, died after returning to Ireland while Helen was a baby; Hugh Waddell remarried before taking his four younger children and new wife back to Japan. Thus Helen spent the first eleven years of her life in Japan. The family then returned to Belfast. When Hugh Waddell died he left his youngest children in the care of their stepmother. Following the marriage of her elder sister, Meg, Helen remained living at home with her stepmother, Mrs Waddell, who ensured that Helen led a restricted social life, in line with Presbyterian thinking, for the rest of her schooldays and during her undergraduate degree, objecting to Helen making visits or taking part in her university's social life. Helen's older brothers and family friends attempted to ensure that Helen had the funds to dress herself appropriately for her age and situation. Mrs Waddell struggled with alcoholism and, as her health deteriorated in her later years, Helen had to bear the physical work of caring for her while shielding the family from the social stigma current at the time.

As the daughter of a Presbyterian minister and missionary, Helen Waddell's religious faith was profound, and she applied her skills in translating Latin theological writing and poetry with the devotion of a critical believer. The biography by Felicitas Corrigan lays great stress on the importance of Helen's faith in influencing the choices she made in her life, and the standards for how she chose to live.

=== Education ===
Waddell was educated at Victoria College for Girls and Queen's University Belfast, where circumstances required her to complete what was normally a three-year degree in two (1910–12). It was at this time that she met her life-long friend, Maude Clarke. Mentored by Professor Gregory Smith at Belfast and her external examiner from Edinburgh University, Professor George Saintsbury, and tutored in her final year by Rubie Warner, she became one of the most brilliant literary scholars of her generation. She completed an MA thesis on John Milton in 1912. After her stepmother's death, Helen was able to choose her own course in life and at the age of 31, in 1920, she moved to Oxford to read for a BLitt. Helen enrolled at Somerville College, Oxford, to study for her doctorate. From 1923 to 1925, Waddell held the Lady Margaret Hall's Susette Taylor Fellowship, a travelling scholarship that allowed her to conduct research in Paris.

=== Career ===
In 1913, Helen Waddell published a book of translations of Chinese poetry, Lyrics from the Chinese, in England with Constable and Company (now Constable & Robinson). In the United States, Lyrics from the Chinese was published by Houghton Mifflin, also in 1913.

Waddell did not submit her thesis for the DPhil, but published her work in 1927 as The Wandering Scholars, which brought to light the history of the medieval goliards and brought Waddell immediate critical and popular acclaim. She began work at Constable, her publisher, initially as a reader, and later on a retainer so that they would have first refusal on her future books. Waddell went on to produce a companion volume to The Wandering Scholars, a translation of goliard Latin poetry entitled Medieval Latin Lyrics. (A second anthology, More Latin Lyrics, was compiled in the 1940s but not published until after her death.)

Waddell's other works range widely in subject matter. For example, she also wrote plays. Her first play was The Spoiled Buddha, which was performed at the Opera House, Belfast, by the Ulster Literary Society. Her The Abbe Prevost was staged in 1935. Her historical novel Peter Abelard was published in 1933. It was critically well received and became a bestseller.

She also wrote many articles for the Evening Standard, the Manchester Guardian and The Nation, and did lecturing and broadcasting.

Waddell held the role of assistant editor of The Nineteenth Century magazine during the Second World War. Among her circle of friends in London, where she was vice-president of the Irish Literary Society, were W. B. Yeats, Virginia Woolf, Rose Macaulay, Max Beerbohm and George William Russell. Her personal and professional friendship with Siegfried Sassoon apparently made the latter's wife suspicious. Although she never married, she had close relationships with several older men, including her publisher, Otto Kyllmann of Constable.

Waddell received honorary degrees from the universities of Columbia, Belfast, Durham and St. Andrews and won the Benson Medal of the Royal Society of Literature.

=== Death ===
A serious debilitating neurological disease put an end to Helen Waddell's writing career in 1950. She died in London in 1965 and was buried in Magherally churchyard, County Down, Northern Ireland.

== Representative works ==
=== Novels ===
- Peter Abelard (1933)

=== Plays ===
- The Spoiled Buddha (performed 1915; London: T. Fisher Unwin 1919)
- The Abbé Prévost (London: Constable 1933).

=== Other ===
- Lyrics from the Chinese. 1913.
- The Wandering Scholars (1927)
- Medieval Latin Lyrics (1929)
- Beasts and Saints (1934)
- The Desert Fathers (1936)
- For Better Factory Laws (1937) Pamphlet
- Poetry in the Dark Ages (1947) "The eighth W. P. Ker Memorial Lecture delivered in the University of Glasgow, 28th October, 1947" (lecture published by Jackson, Son & Company, Publishers to the university, 1948)
- Stories from Holy Writ (1949)
- More Latin Lyrics: From Virgil to Milton (posthumous, edited by Dame Felicitas Corrigan, 1976)
- Between Two Eternities (1993) (posthumous, edited by Dame Felicitas Corrigan.)
