= Frederick Polhill-Turner =

British politician

Frederick Charles Polhill-Turner MP

Member of Parliament for Bedford
- In office 3 February 1874 – 1 April 1880 Serving with Samuel Whitbread
- Preceded by: Samuel Whitbread; James Howard
- Succeeded by: Samuel Whitbread; Charles Magniac

Personal details
- Born: Frederick Charles Polhill; 14 March 1826
- Died: 18 August 1881 (aged 55)
- Party: Conservative
- Spouse: Emily Frances Barron (m. 1852)
- Children: Arthur Twistleton Polhill-Turner; Cecil Henry Polhill-Turner
- Parent(s): Frederick Polhill; Frances Margarette Deakin

Frederick Charles Polhill-Turner (14 March 1826 – 18 August 1881), known as Frederick Polhill until 1853, was a British Conservative politician.

== Political career ==
After three unsuccessful attempts in April 1859, June 1859 and 1868, Polhill-Turner was elected MP for Bedford in 1874, but was defeated at the next election in 1880.

== Military career ==
Polhill-Turner served in the 6th Dragoon Guards - also known as the Carabiniers - and in 1848 became a captain. He then retired in 1852. In 1860, he became Captain of the Duke of Manchester's Mounted Volunteers.

== Family ==
Polhill-Turner was the son of former Bedford MP, Frederick Polhill and Frances Margaretta Deakin. In 1852, he married Emily Frances Barron, daughter of Henry Barron and Anna-Leigh Guy Page-Turner. The marriage helped restore his family fortune; Emily's brother died without children and made Cecil his heir.

The couple had four children, Cecil Polhill and Arthur Polhill who were part of the Cambridge Seven missionary group, Alice, who was also a missionary, and Frederick, who inherited the estate.

Polhill assumed the additional surname of Turner by Royal licence in 1853, as required by the will of his wife's maternal grandmother Dame Frances Page Turner, widow of Sir Gregory Page-Turner, 3rd Baronet.

== Other activities ==
Polhill-Turner was also a Justice of the Peace and, in 1855, became High Sheriff of Bedfordshire.

Polhill-Turner owned the Page Estate in Blackheath, London, which was named after his ancestor, Sir Gregory Page, 2nd Baronet.

Parliament of the United Kingdom
Preceded by Samuel Whitbread; James Howard	Member of Parliament for Bedford; 1874 – 1880; With: Samuel Whitbread	Succeeded by Samuel Whitbread; Charles Magniac
