= Edvard Amundsen =

Norwegian linguist and missionary (1873–1928)

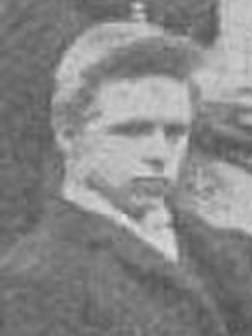
- Born: January 27, 1873; Lille Kirkeholmen, Sannikedal Municipality, Norway
- Died: December 21, 1928 (aged 55); Larvik, Norway
- Occupations: Missionary, linguist
- Spouse: Petrea Ness

Edvard Amundsen (anglicised Edward Amundsen; January 27, 1873 – December 21, 1928) was a Norwegian Lutheran missionary in China and India near the borders of Tibet. He is also remembered as an explorer and Tibetan specialist.

== Biography ==
Amundsen was born in Lille Kirkeholmen in Sannikedal Municipality. In 1894, he journeyed to India as part of Annie Royle Taylor's Tibetan Pioneer Mission, which would fail within a year. In 1896, together with Theo Sørensen, he traveled to Darjeeling and Kalimpong in the Himalayas near the borders of Tibet as a missionary for the China Inland Mission, where he studied Tibetan religion and customs. After their language studies Amundsen attempted to travel from there to Lhasa in Tibet but was halted eight days journey short of the "forbidden city." Later the two of them went to Kangding (Sichuan), China in the foothills of the Tibetan plateau to the west. His wife Petrea Ness (1862–1928), from Mandal, Norway, was also a missionary and accompanied him on his trips to China and Tibet.

During the Boxer Rebellion in 1900 he left China for Darjeeling, but in 1903 he returned and then worked in Yunnan for the British and Foreign Bible Society until 1911. From 1918/19 to 1924 he served in China for the last time for the Mission Covenant Church of Norway.

He died in Larvik. A species of rhododendron is named after him: Rhododendron amundsenianum.

== Selected works ==
- Primer of Standard Tibetan (Darjeeling, 1903)
- In the Land of the Lamas: The Story of Trashilhamo, a Tibetan Lassie (novel; London, 1910)
- Tibetan Manual, with Vocabulary (by Vincent E. Henderson, edited by Amundsen; Calcutta, 1903)

== Gallery ==
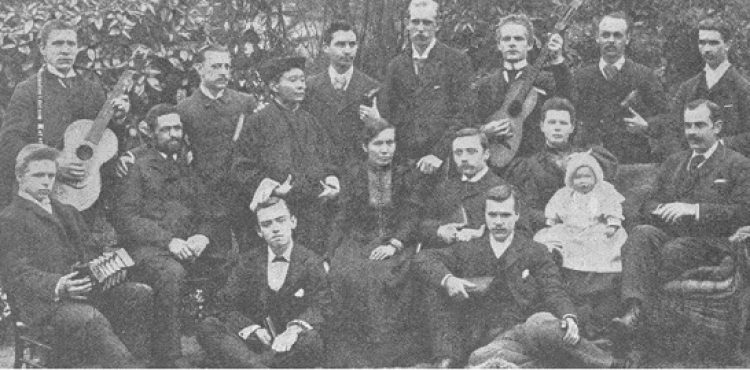
Edvard Amundsen (first from left in the front row, holding a concertina) was a member of Annie Royle Taylor's Tibetan Pioneer Mission; c. 1894.

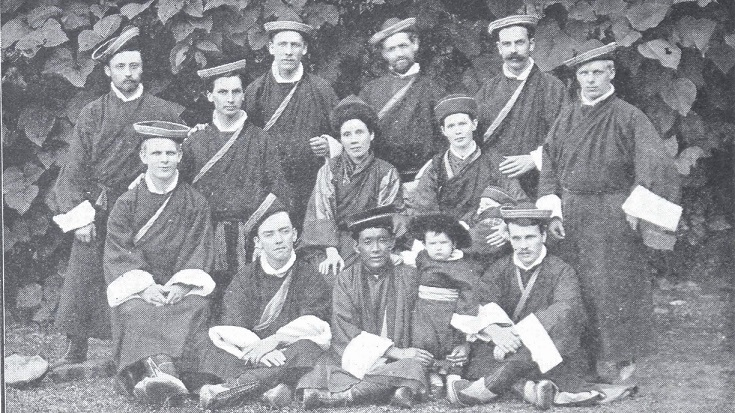
"Tibetan Pioneer Mission Band" in Tibetan dress, c. 1894.

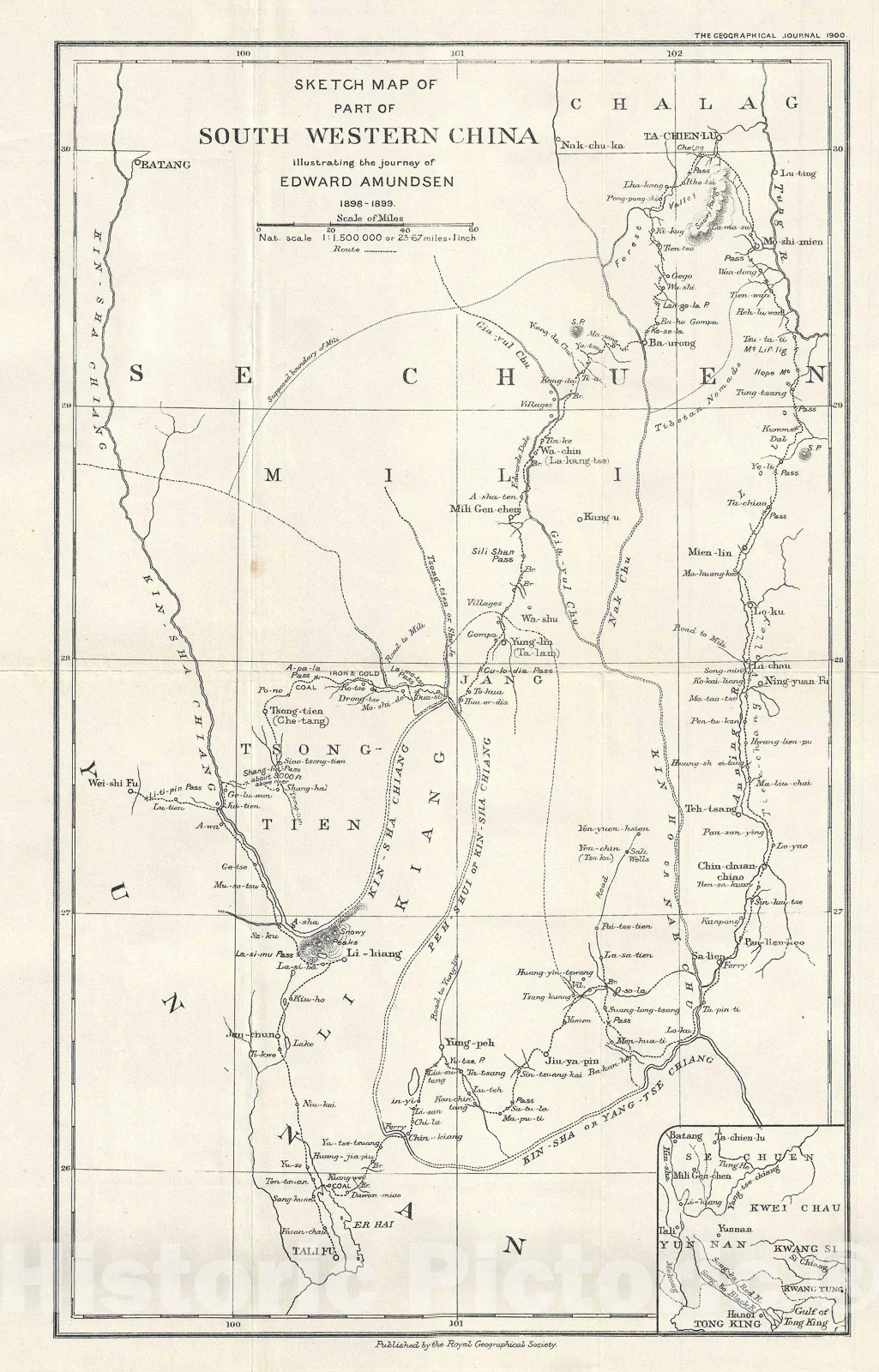
1900 map illustrating Amundsen's journey in Sichuan, East Tibet and Yunnan.

== See also ==
- Christianity in Tibet
- Protestantism in Sichuan
- Gospel Church, Kangding
- Zenas Sanford Loftis
- Cecil Polhill
- Albert Shelton
