= Theo Sørensen =

Norwegian missionary

Theo Sørensen Theo Sörensen
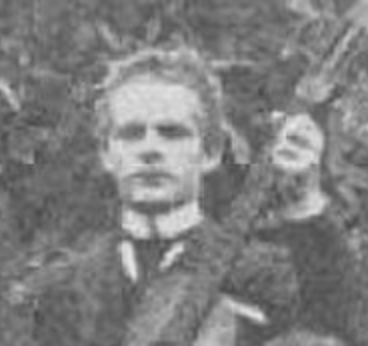
- Born: Theodor August Christian Sørensen; 25 May 1873; Kristiansand, Norway
- Died: 2 September 1959 (aged 86); Kristiansand, Norway
- Occupation: Missionary
- Spouse: Cicilie Rasmussen
- Awards: Royal Norwegian Order of St. Olav

Theodor August Christian Sørensen (25 May 1873 – 2 September 1959) was a Norwegian missionary known for his work in Tibet.

== Biography ==
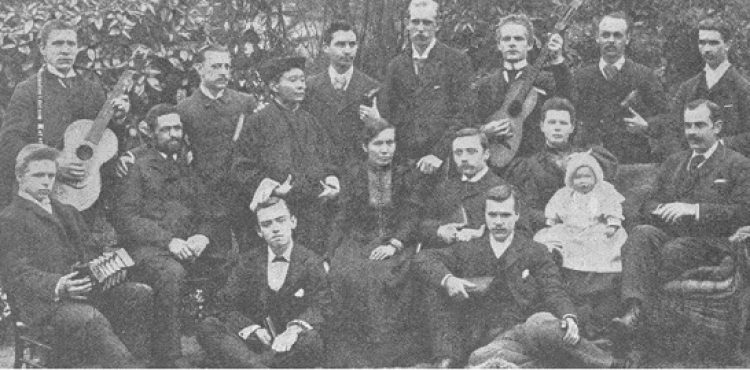
Theo Sørensen (third from right in the back row, holding a guitar) was a member of Annie Royle Taylor's Tibetan Pioneer Mission.

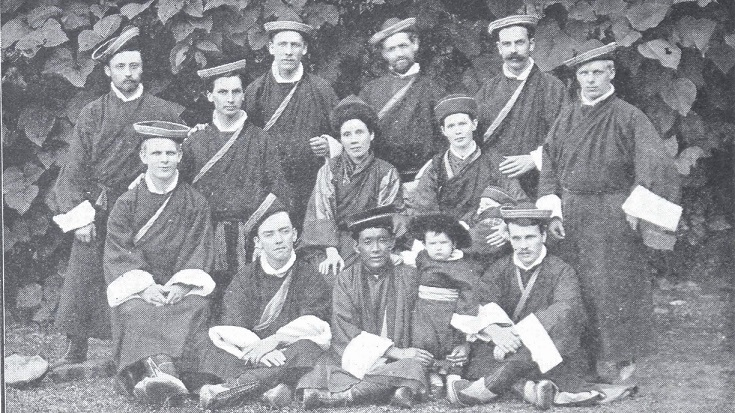
"Tibetan Pioneer Mission Band" in Tibetan dress, c. 1894.

He was born in Kristiansand as the son of a carpenter. He experienced a religious revival in 1891, and joined the Salvation Army. From 1892 to 1894 he attended a bible school in the United Kingdom. He then went to British India with Annie Royle Taylor's Tibetan Pioneer Mission, settled near the Tibetan border and undertook studies of its language and religions together with Edvard Amundsen. He wanted to travel within Tibet, but as this was rejected by the British colonial power, he moved to Chengtu, Chinese Manchu Empire in 1896. Here he studied the Chinese language, and proclaimed that learning Chinese was a "delight" compared to Tibetan. From 1899 to 1923 he lived and worked for the China Inland Mission in Tatsienlu, Szechwan, where he established the Tibetan Religious Tract Society in early 1918. The society was renamed Tibetan Religious Literature Depot at the end of the following year, which produced Christian booklets and other Christian readings in Standard Tibetan for evangelism throughout Tibet.

He did not particularly succeed as a missionary, but conducted several longer travels in Eastern Tibet and became known for collecting Tibetan scripture. Among others, he found a series of written sheets in the ruins of a monastery. Upon returning to Norway in 1923, he donated a 314-volume collection of Tibetan Buddhist canon to the University of Christiania. The texts particularly pertained to Bön and Nyingma schools of Tibetan Buddhism.

For his contribution, Sørensen was declared a Fellow of the Royal Anthropological Institute in 1922 and the Royal Geographical Society in 1923. In 1953 he was proclaimed Knight, First Class of the Royal Norwegian Order of St. Olav. He lived the rest of his life in Norway, except for the years 1925 to 1936 which he spent in Peking. He had married fellow missionary Cecilie "Cissi" Rasmussen (1870–1955) in March 1904 in Kiating. Also, he rejoined the Church of Norway in 1924. He died in September 1959 in Kristiansand. In 2009, his grandniece donated another set of scriptures to the University of Oslo.

== Publications ==
- Sörensen, Theo. (1921). Work in Tibet. Tatsienlu: China Inland Mission.

== See also ==
- Christianity in Tibet
- Protestantism in Sichuan
- Gospel Church, Tatsienlu
- Zenas Sanford Loftis
- Cecil Polhill
- Albert Shelton
