= Annie Royle Taylor =

British explorer

Annie (Hannah) Royle Taylor
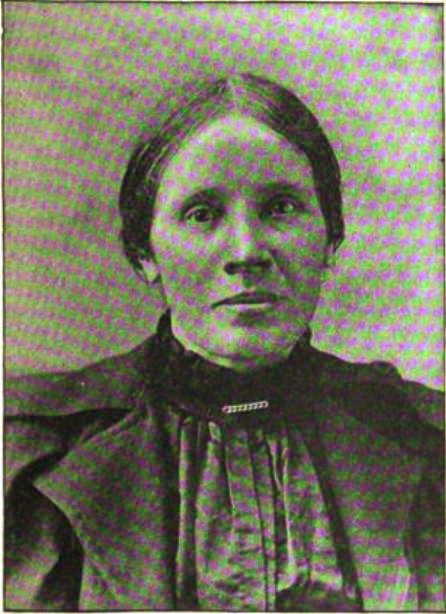
- Annie Taylor (1897)
- Born: 7 October 1855; Egremont, Cheshire, England
- Died: 9 September 1922; Cromwell Crescent, Kensington, London, England
- Occupation(s): Missionary, explorer

Hannah Royle Taylor (7 October 1855 – 9 September 1922), known as Annie Royle Taylor, was an English explorer and Evangelical missionary to Tibet. She was the first Western woman known to have visited Tibet. She attempted to reach the "forbidden" city of Lhasa in 1892–1893.

== Early life ==
She was a daughter of John Taylor, one of the directors of the Black Ball Line of packet ships. At the age of 13 she converted to evangelical Christianity. Against her parents' wishes, she was determined to become a missionary. After studying medicine and working in the slums of London and Brighton, she joined the China Inland Mission. (She was no relation to CIM founder Hudson Taylor.) She sailed to Shanghai in 1884 and was posted to Lanzhou on the borders of Tibet in 1886. Recalled from Lanzhou in 1888 because of poor health, she recuperated in Australia and determined to evangelise within Tibet.

She described herself as a troublesome and unhealthy child. She was a "lone wolf...so bad at harmonious relationships with colleagues that she would have to be returned to Britain or stretched to her own limits." Hudson Taylor wrote in 1890 that she was "having a very hard time of it." Her father's wealth permitted her to be independent, not needing financial support from CIM.

== Expedition to Tibet ==
In 1889, Taylor journeyed to Darjeeling, India, and subsequently to Sikkim to study the Tibetan language at a Buddhist monastery. While there she converted to Christianity a young Tibetan named Pontso, about 19 years old, who was to accompany her on her expedition to Tibet. In March 1891, she left Sikkim with Pontso and traveled to China, making her way to Tianshui where she founded a mission. Tianshui was a jumping off spot for commerce with Tibet.

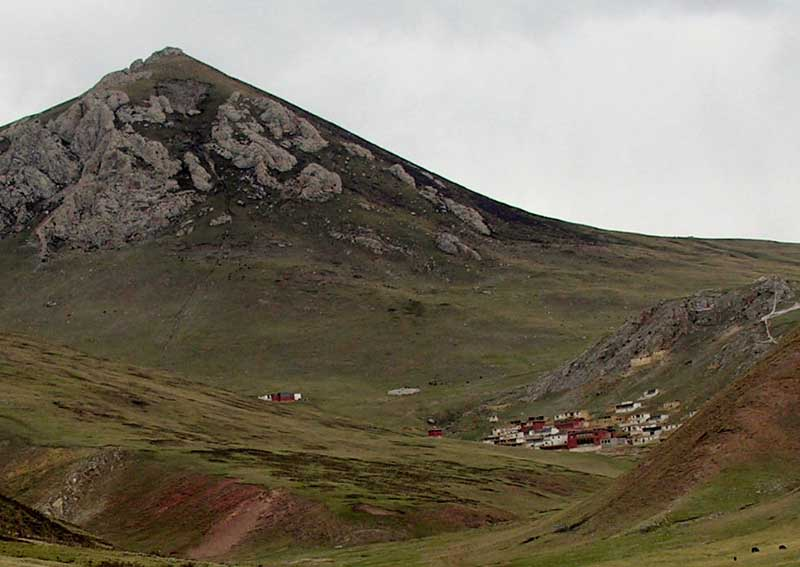
Domka Nedo monastery near Gyegu. When Taylor passed through this region in November 1892 it was cold and snowy.

On 2 September 1892, Taylor and Pontso left Tianshui with three Chinese helpers (one died and another left the party shortly), sixteen horses, two months food and equipment, and the objective of reaching Lhasa, capital of Tibet, closed to foreigners. Taylor shaved her hair and wore Tibetan dress to disguise herself as a Tibetan. They proceeded southwest, passing through lands belonging to Mongol and Golog nomads, losing some of their horses to bandits, and spending two months without seeing a house. They arrived in Gyêgu (Jyekundo), the center of the tea trade between China and Tibet on 11 November, but bypassed the town, fearing they would be apprehended by the authorities. From Gyegu they followed a well-known caravan trail toward Lhasa.

By this time, the little caravan was riven with dissention with Taylor fearing that Noga, her hired Chinese Muslim guide, might betray or even murder her. The transcriber of Taylor's diary, who knew Taylor well, suggests that Noga did not consider himself a servant, but rather an equal and that the dissention might have been due to misunderstanding of the hierarchy of their relationship. To Taylor's relief, Noga departed on 14 December.

On 3 January 1893, cold, most of their horses dead or stolen and without food—but only three days march from Lhasa—Taylor, Pontsu, and another servant were apprehended by Tibetan authorities beyond Nagchu. After several days of difficult negotiations, Taylor was told that she must return to China by the shortest route. She demanded food and horses from the Tibetans, complained about the quality of both, and traded her watch for a tent. On 19 January, with a ten-soldier escort, she and her two companions departed Nagchu and returned to Gyêgu. The soldiers soon left them in the company of merchants and she traveled onward in bitter cold, reaching Gyêgu on 21 February. From Gyêgu, she arranged to continue her journey with Chinese merchants via the tea road to Tachienlu (Kangding today), paying Tibetans to carry their few remaining goods. On 12 April 1893 she and Pontso, her only remaining companion, arrived in Kangding. French missionaries there assisted her and two days later she departed to the coast of China and to return to England.

== Later life ==
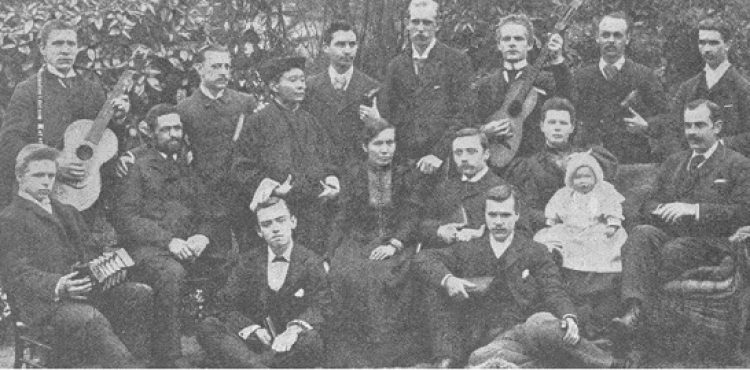
Annie Taylor's Tibetan Pioneer Mission. Back row (from the left): Johan A. Johansen, T. J. Orr, James Neave, Tom Craig, Theodor Sørensen, H. Arnott, G. Shireff. Middle: William Soutter, Pontso, Miss Annie R. Taylor, Mrs. Mackenzie, Evan Mackenzie. Front: Edward Amundsen, Henry M. Stumbles, James Moyes.

Taylor became a minor celebrity in England. She formed an organization called the "Tibetan Pioneer Mission" and recruited fourteen people to travel with her to Sikkim to study Tibetan and evangelize on the borders of Tibet. The mission did not succeed. Within a year, it is said that "the new missionaries repudiated her leadership and called on the CIM for assistance." At Taylor's suggestion, Cecil H. Polhill-Turner of the CIM, was asked to assume the leadership of the Tibetan Pioneer Mission. Under Polhill-Turner's guidance, the mission band continued their work in British Bhutan and on the Sino-Tibetan border.

In May 1894, she moved to Yatung (near Rinchengang) in the Chumbi Valley, where the British had a concession to run a trade mart. She opened a store there and remained till 1907. In 1897, she brought two consignments of Tibetan artefacts to Britain and sold them to the Edinburgh Museum of Science and Art. William Carey visited her in Yatung and brought back her diaries, publishing them in 1902. In 1904, Taylor accompanied the Younghusband Expedition to Tibet, serving as a nurse.

Taylor returned to London in 1907 and lived in a private asylum in Fulham. She died on 9 September 1922 and was buried on 13 September 1922 at West Norwood Cemetery.

== See also ==
- Christianity in Tibet
- Zenas Sanford Loftis
- Susanna Carson Rijnhart
- Albert Shelton
- History of European exploration in Tibet

== Published works ==
- Taylor, Annie R. Pioneering in Tibet. London: Morgan and Scott, (1898)
- Taylor, Annie R. (1902). William Carey (ed.). Travel and Adventure in Tibet: Including the Diary of Miss Annie R. Taylor's Remarkable Journey from Tau-Chau to Ta-Chien-Lu Through the Heart of the "Forbidden Land". Hodder and Stoughton.
