= Dieulacres Chronicle =

The Dieulacres Chronicle (Latin: Chronicon monasterii Dieulacrensis) is a 14th-century English chronicle that was written at the Cistercian Dieulacres Abbey in Staffordshire. It has three parts: the first is a description of England that borrows from Bede, Ranulf Higden and Gerald of Wales; the second is a history of the earls of Chester and Dieulacres Abbey dating to the 13th century; and the third is a history of England spanning the years from 1337-1403. After Henry Bolingbroke and Thomas Arundel invaded England and deposed Richard II, a number of chronicles, including Dieulacres were edited by newly appointed scribes to support Henry's Lancastrian claim to the throne.
