= Mary Wills (philanthropist) =

British philanthropist

- Born: Mary Monica Cunliffe-Owen; 18 January 1861; Brompton, Middlesex
- Died: 2 April 1931 (aged 70); Wrington, Somerset
- Occupation: Philanthropist

Dame Mary Monica Cunliffe-Owen, Mrs Wills DBE DStJ (18 January 1861 – 2 April 1931) was an English philanthropist.

== Early years ==
She was born in Brompton, Middlesex, the daughter of Sir Philip Cunliffe-Owen and Jenny Eliza Pamila Julia (von Reitzenstein). In 1886, she married Henry Herbert Wills, a member of the Wills tobacco family; the union was apparently childless. She spent her latter years at Rockdunder, Wrington, Somerset, and it was there that she died on 2 April 1931. Her sister, Victoria Mary Louise Adelaide Cunliffe-Owen, was married to the publisher Otto Kyllmann.

She was appointed a Dame Commander of the Order of the British Empire (DBE) in the 1925 Birthday Honours in recognition of her public service.
