= Mary Ann Wills =

New Zealand artist

- Born: Mary Ann Wykes; 1859?
- Died: 1942; Waipukurau
- Resting place: Ormondville
- Occupation: artist
- Years active: 1885–1936
- Spouse: Thomas John Wills
- Children: 3

Mary Ann Wills (née Wykes) (1859?–1942) was a New Zealand artist.

== Biography ==
Wills, born Mary Wykes, married Thomas John Wills, a minister in the Anglican Church, in 1886. Rev. Wills was a leader in the temperance movement and died at aged 46, while minister at the Ormondville vicarage.

Throughout her life, she lived in several locations across both the North and South Islands of New Zealand, including North Canterbury, Westland, Napier, Ormondville, Tokaanu, Taupō, and Ōtaki.

Wills primarily painted landscapes of various locations across New Zealand. She painted over 300 watercolours and oils from 1880-1930s, such as landscapes of Ormondville and Waihi, Taupō, many of which are housed in the National Library of New Zealand. She is said to have known C. F. Goldie who visited her when he returned from a trip to Paris.

She had three sons. Her sons included Webster Harold "Harold" Wills (headmaster of Ōtaki Native College) and her youngest son, Edgar J. Wills.

She died in Waipukurau and was buried in Ormondville, where her late husband had been vicar.

== Paintings ==
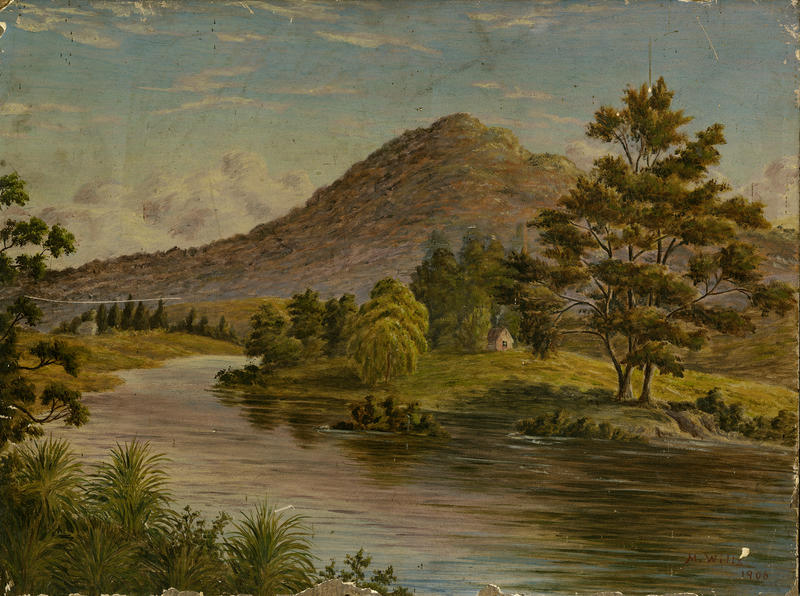
Wills, Mary Ann. (1900). Ngongotahi, Rotorua. Watercolour.

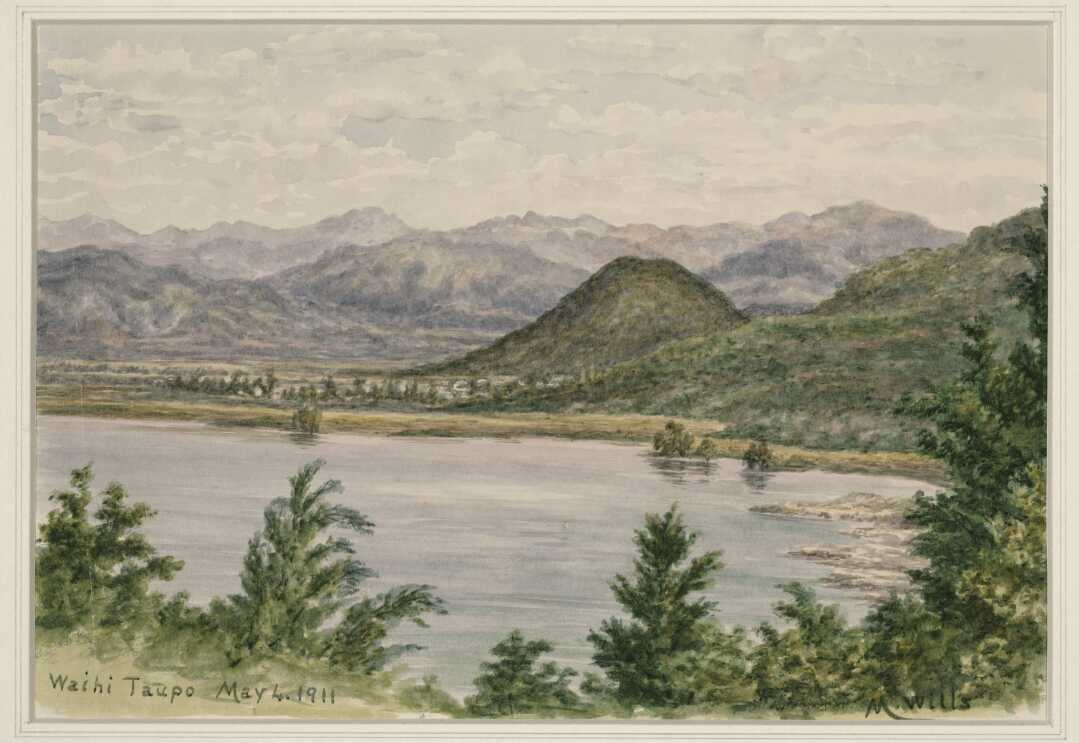
Wills, Mary Ann. (May 4, 1911). Waihi, Taupo. Watercolour.

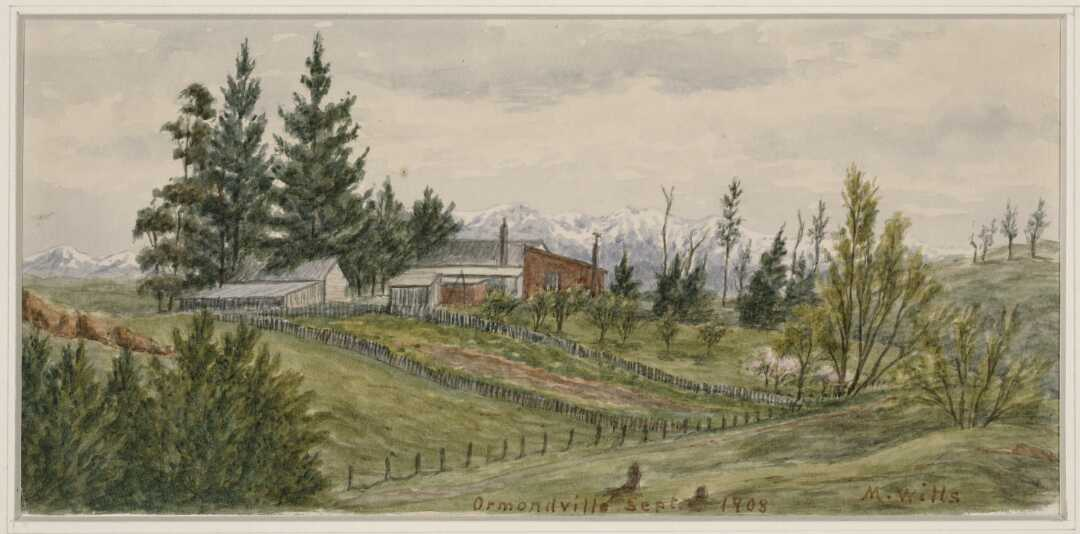
Wills, Mary Ann. (September 1908). Ormondville. Watercolour.

Signature of Mary Ann Wills from Waihi, Taupo.
