= Foreign Christian Missionary Society =

Foreign Christian Missionary Society (FCMS) was a Christian missionary society established by the Disciples of Christ. The Foreign Christian Missionary Society was established toward the end of 1876. The Society was organized for three main reasons:

- To obey the will of God,
- The belief that Christian work abroad might facilitate and awaken a missionary spirit in America; and
- Because the American Christian Missionary Society was, at the time, not in a position to engage in foreign missionary work.

In its initial days, the Society began its work in England, Denmark, France, Sweden, Turkey, and Anatolia. From the years 1882 to 1903 missionaries were sent out to establish stations in India, Japan, China, Africa, Cuba, Honolulu, the Philippines, and Tibet. From 1903 to 1918 the Society focused on missionary expansion in the following regions: England, Scandinavia, Paris, Turkey, India, Japan, China, Africa, Cuba, the Philippines, and Tibet.

The FCMS became part of the United Christian Missionary Society when it was formed in 1920.

== The mission in India ==
The mission in India was originally formed by a group of eight missionaries. This undertaking was fueled by a fundamental belief that missionary work could bring about the redemption of India._{,}_{,} The mission was settled in the Central Provinces of India in order to avoid interfering with other established missions in the country. The Society's first station was set up in Harda, its second in Jubbulpore, and third in Mungeli. All stations required their missionaries to dedicate their first and sometimes second year to language study. The mission made a special effort to recruit native teachers and evangelists, since they already had extensive knowledge of the language and people, and thus knew how best to respond to opposition. During the cool season missionaries camped out in the various Indian villages for several weeks. On these mission tours, medical services were offered while the Gospel was preached._{,}_{,}

=== Harda ===
The Society sent its first medical missionary, Dr. C. S. Durand, to India in 1889. Until Durand arrived, none of the missionaries were qualified physicians and the nearest physician was 68 miles from Harda. Durand opened two hospitals in Harda during his tenure. Dr. Drummond arrived in 1897 to fill Durand's position after he stepped down. While Drummond was on his second furlough, Dr. George E. Miller took charge of the medical work in Harda.

=== Importance of female missionaries and zenana work ===
It was only possible to reach women of higher castes in their homes, since they were not to be seen in public spaces, being segregated in women's quarters known as zenana. Only female missionaries were able to enter into these quarters, and female zenana missions were created to do this work. Female nurses and physicians were furthermore able to care for the Indian women and children who were afraid or forbidden to be seen by male physicians.

Zenana work was especially important to the mission because it was in the homes of the local Indian people where the opposing faiths (i.e. Islam and Hinduism) dwelled. Missionaries felt that the Indian women were particularly responsible for maintaining the customs and practices of these religions.

=== Famine ===
The famines of 1897 and 1900 were primarily felt by the Central Provinces thus worked to the missionaries’ benefit._{,} The missionaries proved to be of great assistance to the community by rescuing hundreds of people and placing homeless children in orphanages. Mungeli's church and hospital were built in this time.

=== Mungeli ===
Mungeli proved to be the greatest challenge for the missionaries compared to all the other mission fields in India. Dr. George E. Miller was placed here in 1909 to oversee the mission's medical work. His wife, Mrs. Miller, joined him in 1914._{,} Hira Lal, the highly trained Indian medical assistant, was of invaluable help to Dr. George E. Miller and the mission._{,} He and his wife, Mrs. M.J. Shah, were considered two of the strongest Christian Indian leaders in this time. In fact, Mrs. Shah was the first convert in Mungeli and until the famine of 1897, almost all members of the Mungeli church consisted of Hira Lal's relatives.

=== Damoh ===
Damoh became an additional missionary site in 1894. Two orphanages were opened in 1906. One was for low caste boys, and the other for poor girls. Both farming and gardening were taught at the boys’ orphanage, since most of the Indian population makes a living from agriculture. Dr. George E. Miller was transferred to from Harda to the valley of Hatta in the Damoh District until 1908. He was a great lover of boys and was responsible for the establishment of a low caste boys’ school, since the other boys’ school in Hatta was only open to high caste boys.

=== Challenges of Christian proselytization in India ===
The greatest challenge to the mission was the caste system. The system prevented the development of brotherhood and fellowship in India. Members of Hindu higher castes remained spiritually proud, while members of the lower castes remained devoid of hope and felt they were fated to their lives of poverty and subordination. The mission's second main challenge was the Indian Muslims who made special efforts to counteract the missionary progress. The third hindrance was ignorance and illiteracy. It was commonly felt among the missionaries that superstition and fear dominated the people of India, and that illiteracy prevented them from discovering the truth of Christianity for themselves._{,} The fourth challenge to the mission was the poverty in India. It was believed that the people living in these conditions were not in the right frame of mind to receive and embrace the gospel message. See also criticism of Christianity and persecution of Hindus.

== See also ==
- Protestant missionary societies in China during the 19th Century
- Timeline of Chinese history
- 19th-century Protestant missions in China
- List of Protestant missionaries in China
- Christianity in China
- Albert Shelton

== Bibliography ==
- McLean, Archibald. The History of the Foreign Christian Missionary Society. New York: Fleming H. Revell, 1919.
- Miller, George E. In the Land of Sweepers and Kings: (medical Missionary Work in India). Cincinnati: Powell & White, 1922.
- The Missionary Intelligencer. Cincinnati: Foreign Christian Missionary Society. 20.1 (1907).
- Wilson, Bert. In the Land of the Salaam. Cincinnati, O: Powell & White, 1921. 271–275.
