= Religion in Tibet =

Religious beliefs in Tibet

Religion in Tibet, China (estimates as of 2012)
1. Tibetan Buddhism (78.5%)
2. Bon (12.5%)
3. Chinese folk religion and others (8.58%)
4. Islam (0.40%)
5. Christianity (0.02%)

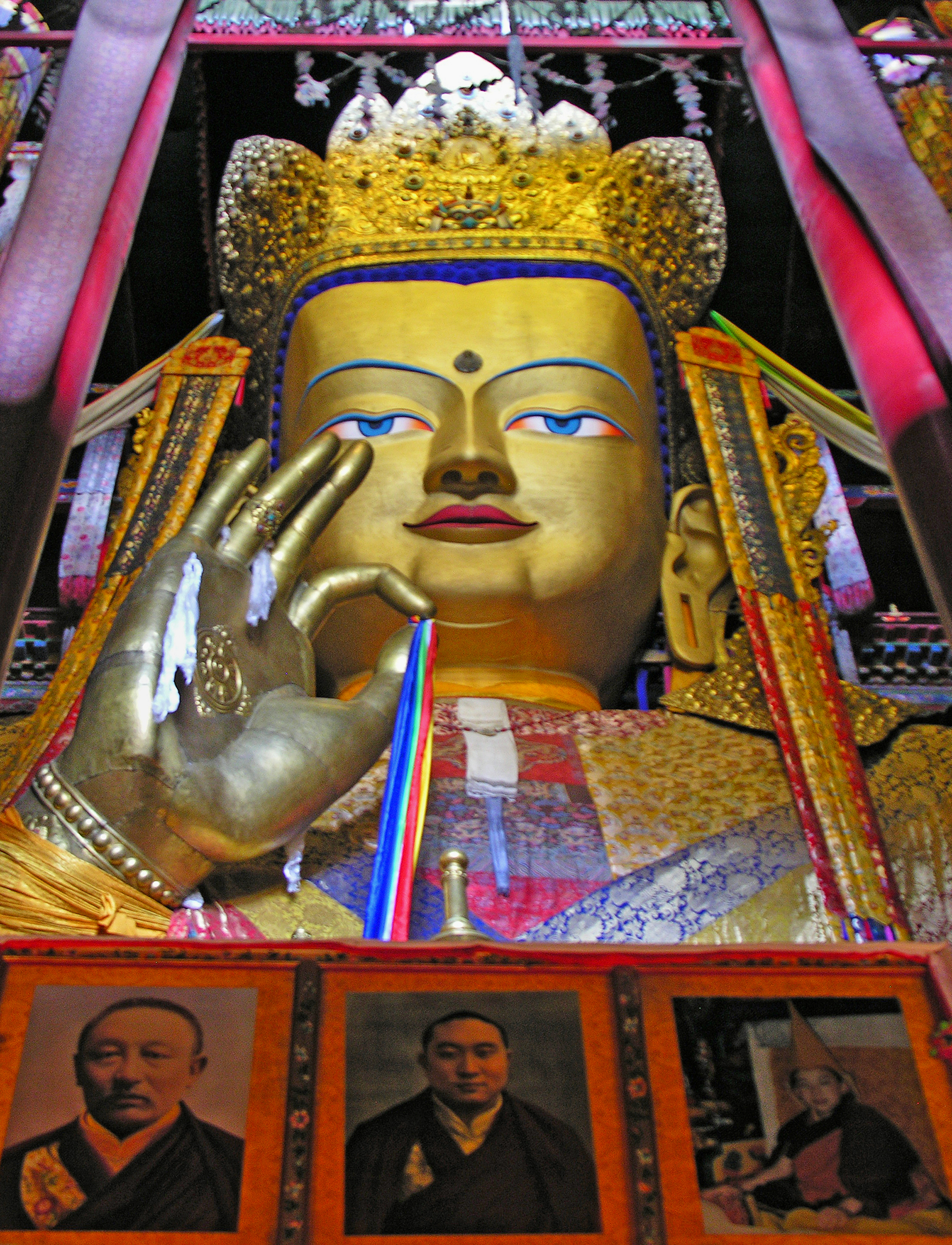
Maitreya Buddha statue of Tashilhunpo Monastery in Shigatse

The main religion in Tibet has been Buddhism since its introduction in the 8th century CE. As of 2022 the historical region of Tibet (the areas inhabited by ethnic Tibetans) mostly comprises the Tibet Autonomous Region (TAR) of China and partly the Chinese provinces of Qinghai, Sichuan, Gansu, and Yunnan. Before the arrival of Buddhism, the main religion among Tibetans was an indigenous shamanic and animistic religion, Bon, which would later influence the formation of Tibetan Buddhism and still attracts the allegiance of a sizeable minority of Tibetans.

According to estimates from the International Religious Freedom Report of 2012, most Tibetans (who comprise 91% of the population of the Tibet Autonomous Region) are associated with Tibetan Buddhism, while a minority of 400,000 people (12.5% of the total population of the TAR) profess the native Bon religion. Other groups in Tibet practise folk religions which share the image of Confucius (Tibetan: Kongtse Trulgyi Gyalpo) with Chinese folk religion, though in a different light. The statistics do not cover the government-sponsored atheist proportion of the Tibetan population. According to some reports, the government of China has been promoting the Bon religion, linking it with Confucianism.

== Bön ==
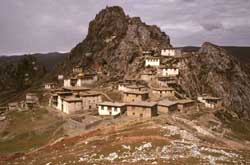
Khyungpori Tsedruk Bon Monastery in the Tibet Autonomous Region.

Bön, the indigenous animist and shamanic belief system of Tibet, revolves around the worship of nature and claims to predate Buddhism.

According to Bon religious texts: three Bon scriptures – mdo 'dus, gzer mig, and gzi brjid – relate the mythos of Tonpa Shenrab Miwoche. The Bonpos regard the first two as gter ma rediscovered around the eleventh century and the last as nyan brgyud (oral transmission) dictated by Loden Nyingpo, who lived in the fourteenth century. In the fourteenth century, Loden Nyingpo revealed a terma known as The Brilliance (Wylie: gzi brjid), which contained the story of Tonpa Shenrab. He was not the first Bonpo tertön, but his terma became one of the definitive scriptures of Bon religion. It states that Shenrab established the Bon religion while searching for a horse stolen by a demon. Tradition also tells that he was born in the land of Tagzig Olmo Lung Ring (considered an axis mundi) which is traditionally identified as Mount Yung-drung Gu-tzeg ("Edifice of Nine Sauwastikas"), possibly Mount Kailash, in western Tibet. Due to the sacredness of Tagzig Olmo Lungting and Mount Kailash, the Bonpo regard both the swastika and the number nine as auspicious and as of great significance.

Tonpa Shenrab Miwoche visited Kongpo and found people whose practice involved spiritual appeasement with animal sacrifice. He taught them to substitute offerings with symbolic animal forms made from barley flour. He only taught according to the student's capability with lower shamanic vehicles to prepare; until with prayer, diligence, devotion and application they could incarnate to achieve sutra, tantra and Dzogchen.

Bon teachings feature Nine Vehicles, which are pathway-teaching categories with distinct characteristics, views, practices and results. Medicine, astrology, and divination are in the lower vehicles; then sutra and tantra, with Dzogchen great perfection being the highest. Traditionally, the Nine Vehicles are taught in three versions: as Central, Northern and Southern treasures. The Central treasure is closest to Nyingma Nine Yānas teaching and the Northern treasure is lost. Tenzin Wangyal Rinpoche elaborated the Southern treasure with shamanism.

== Tibetan Buddhism ==
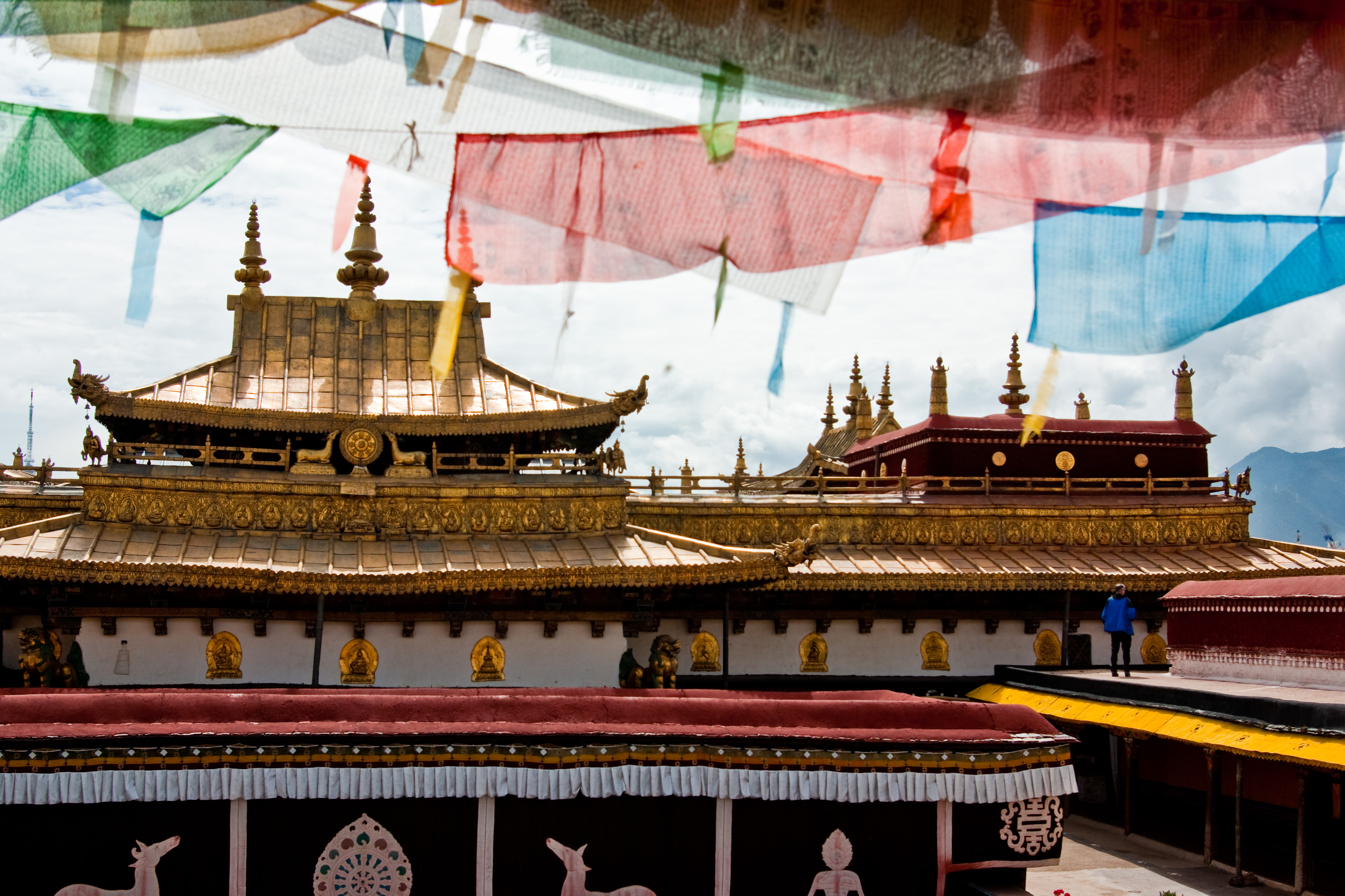
View of Jokhang, one of the most important monasteries of Tibet.

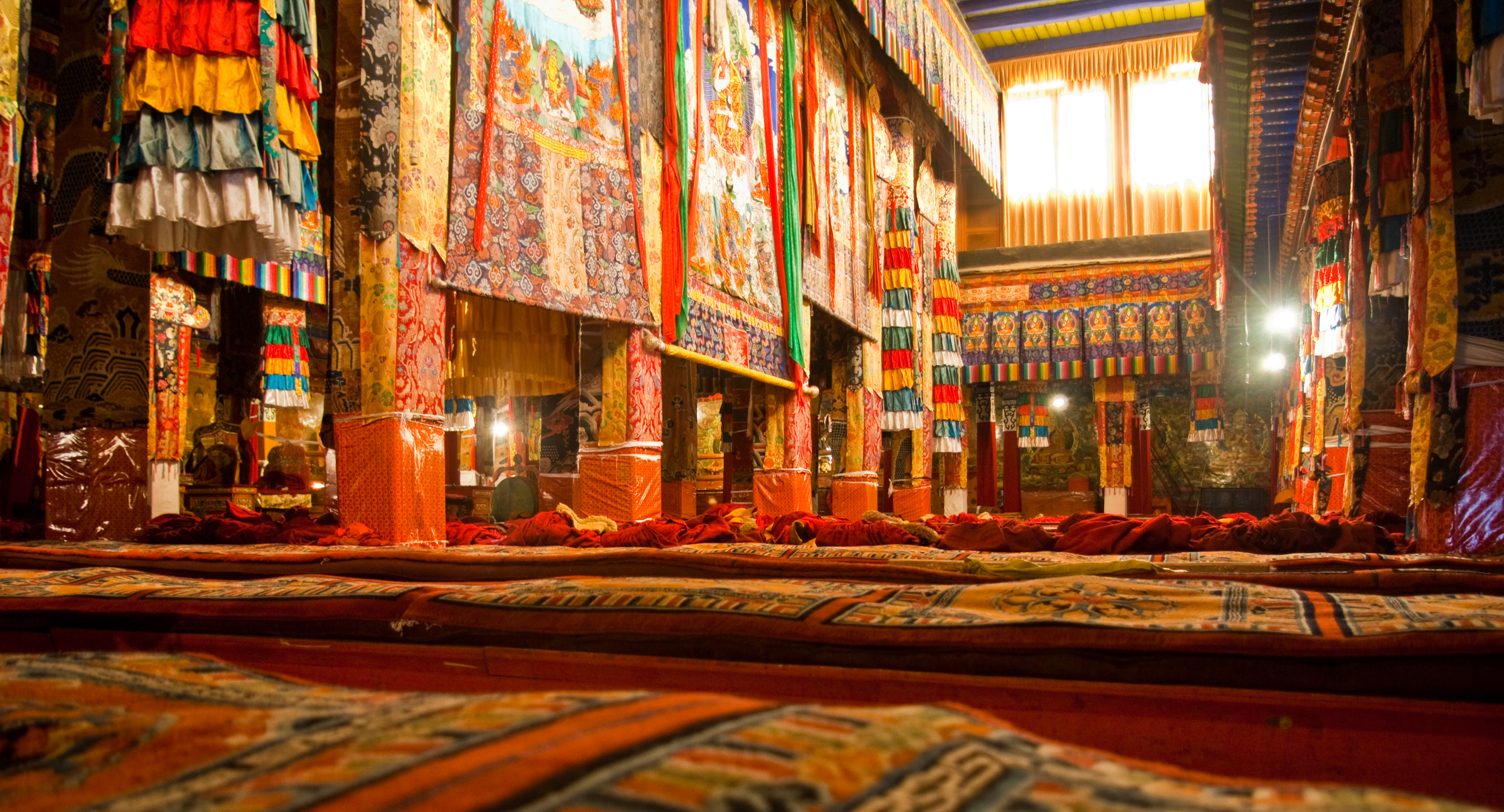
Interior of Ganden Monastery.

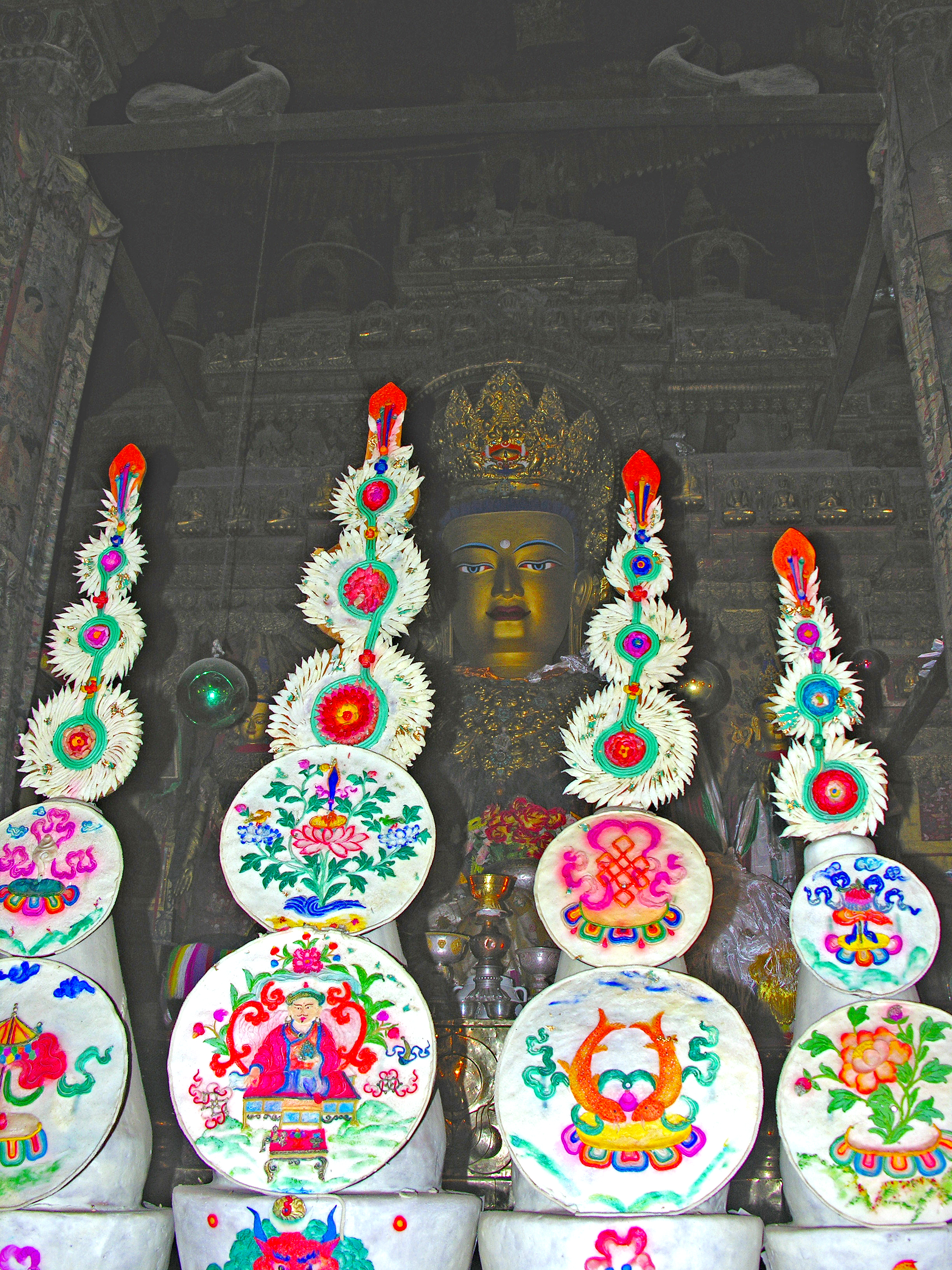
Yak butter candles in front of the Shakyamuni Buddha, they are supposed to be some of the finest examples in the world. At Baiju Monastery, Gyangtse.

Religion is extremely important to the Tibetans and has a strong influence over all aspects of their lives. Bön is the ancient religion of Tibet, but nowadays the major influence is Tibetan Buddhism, a distinctive form of Mahayana and Vajrayana, which was introduced into Tibet from the Sanskrit Buddhist tradition of northern India. Tibetan Buddhism is practiced not only in Tibet but also in Mongolia (During the Yuan Dynasty, the Mongol rulers of the Yuan Dynasty made Tibetan Buddhism the state religion and from there it spread to the Mongolian region.), parts of northern India, the Buryat Republic, the Tuva Republic, and in the Republic of Kalmykia and some other parts of China.

Tibetan Buddhism has four main traditions (the suffix pa is comparable to "er" in English):

- Gelug(pa), Way of Virtue, also known casually as Yellow Hat, whose spiritual head is the Ganden Tripa and whose temporal head is the Dalai Lama. Successive Dalai Lamas ruled Tibet from the mid-17th to mid-20th centuries. This order was founded in the 14th to 15th centuries by Je Tsongkhapa, based on the foundations of the Kadampa tradition. Tsongkhapa was renowned for both his scholasticism and his virtue. The Dalai Lama belongs to the Gelugpa school, and is regarded as the embodiment of the Bodhisattva of Compassion.
- Kagyu(pa), Oral Lineage. This contains one major subsect and one minor subsect. The first, the Dagpo Kagyu, encompasses those Kagyu schools that trace back to Gampopa. In turn, the Dagpo Kagyu consists of four major sub-sects: the Karma Kagyu, headed by a Karmapa, the Tsalpa Kagyu, the Barom Kagyu, and Pagtru Kagyu. The once-obscure Shangpa Kagyu, which was famously represented by the 20th-century teacher Kalu Rinpoche, traces its history back to the Indian master Niguma, sister of Kagyu lineage holder Naropa. This is an oral tradition which is very much concerned with the experiential dimension of meditation. Its most famous exponent was Milarepa, an 11th-century mystic.
- Nyingma(pa), The Ancient Ones. This is the oldest, the original order founded by Padmasambhava. Both the Nyingma and Kagyu maintained and developed instructions on the nature of mind, and on meditations cultivating recognition of that nature, known as the mind teachings of Tibet.
- Sakya(pa), Grey Earth, headed by the Sakya Trizin, founded by Khon Konchog Gyalpo, a disciple of the great translator Drokmi Lotsawa. Sakya Pandita 1182–1251 CE was the great-grandson of Khon Konchog Gyalpo. This school emphasizes scholarship.

== Chinese Ethnic Religions ==
Most of the Han Chinese who reside in Tibet practice their native Chinese folk religion. There is a Guandi Temple of Lhasa (拉萨关帝庙) where the Chinese god of war Guandi is identified with the cross-ethnic Chinese, Tibetan, Mongol and Manchu deity Gesar. The temple is built according to both Chinese and Tibetan architecture. It was first erected in 1792 under the Qing dynasty and renovated around 2013 after decades of disrepair.

Built or rebuilt between 2014 and 2015 is the Guandi Temple of Qomolangma (Mount Everest), on Ganggar Mount, in Tingri County.

There is a Tibetan folk religious sect in Amdo County named the "Heroes of Ling", which was founded in 1981 by a Tibetan called Sonam Phuntsog, who claimed to be an incarnation of the legendary hero Gesar, which was later banned as a disruptive and "splittist" sect.

== Islam ==
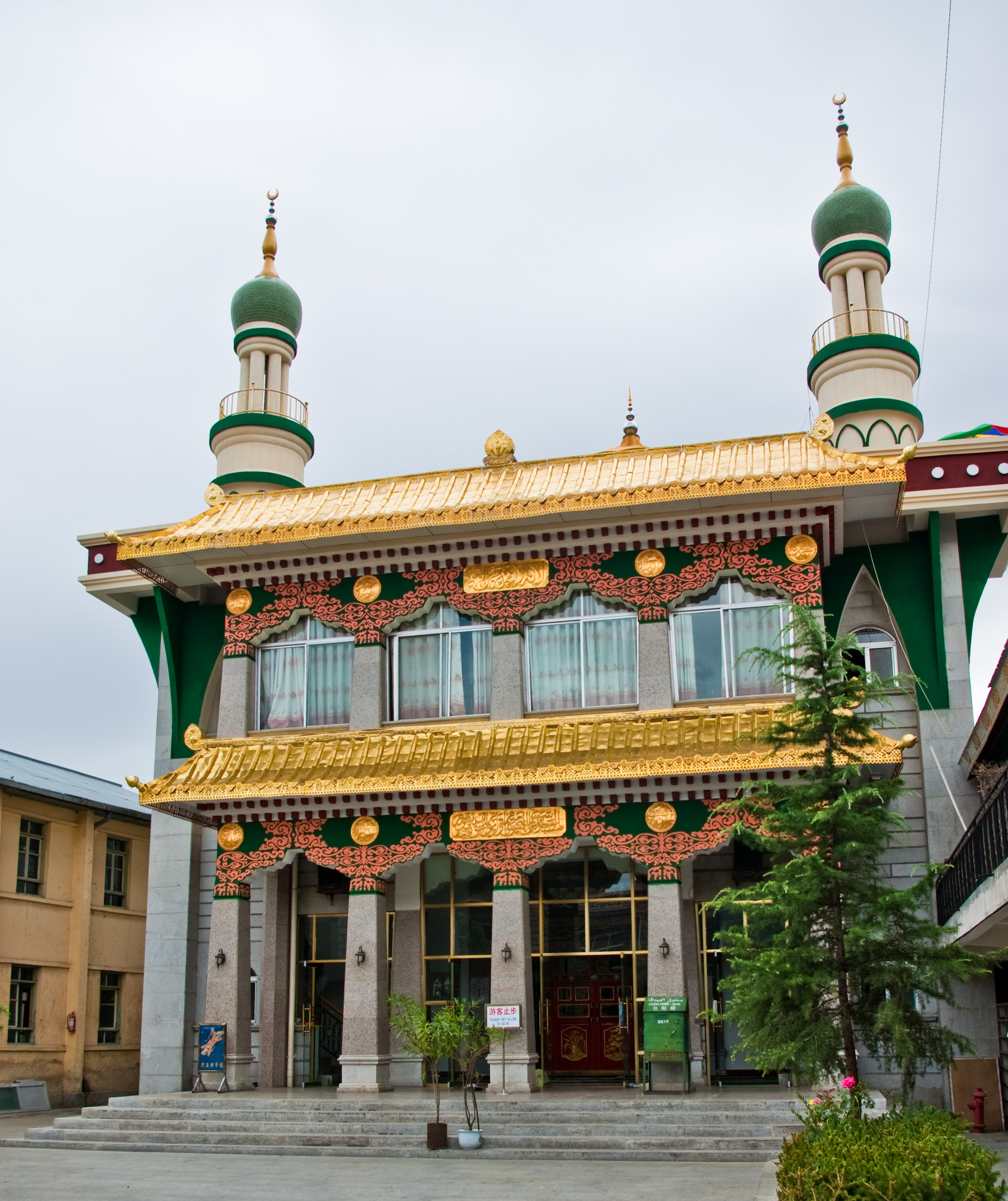
Great Mosque of Lhasa.

Tibetan Muslims, also known as the Khache (Tibetan: ཁ་ཆེ་, lit. 'Kashmiris'), are Tibetans who adhere to Islam. Many are descendants of Kashmiris, Ladakhis, and Nepalis who arrived in Tibet in the 14th to 17th centuries. There are approximately 5,000 Tibetan Muslims living in China, over 1,500 in India, and 300 to 400 in Nepal. The government of the People's Republic of China does not recognize the Tibetan Muslims as a distinct ethnic group; they are grouped with Tibetan adherents of Buddhism and Bon. In contrast, the Chinese-speaking Hui Muslims are distinguished from the Han Chinese majority. Historically Tibet had 11 mosques, but only 5 survived.

== Christianity ==
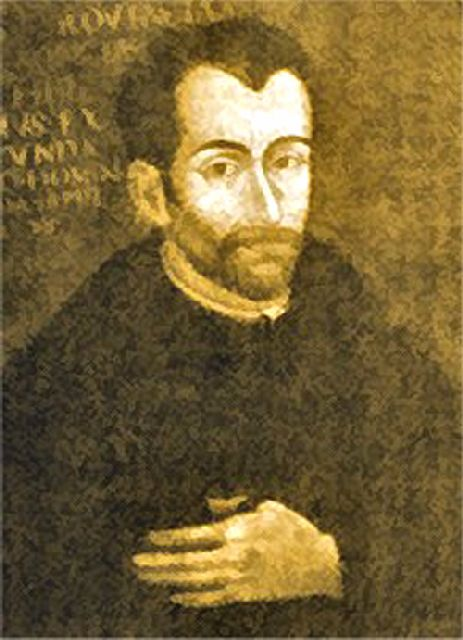
Antonio de Andrade

The first Christians documented to have reached Tibet were the Nestorians, of whom various remains and inscriptions have been found in Tibet. They were also present at the imperial camp of Möngke Khan at Shira Ordo, where they debated in 1256 with Karma Pakshi (1204/6-83), head of the Karma Kagyu order. Desideri, who reached Lhasa in 1716, encountered Armenian and Russian merchants.

Roman Catholic Jesuits and Capuchins arrived from Europe in the 17th and 18th centuries. Portuguese missionaries Jesuit Father António de Andrade and Brother Manuel Marques first reached the kingdom of Guge in western Tibet in 1624 and was welcomed by the royal family who allowed them to build a church later on. By 1627, there were about a hundred local converts in the Guge kingdom. Later on, Christianity was introduced to Rudok, Ladakh and Tsang and was welcomed by the ruler of the Tsang kingdom, where Andrade and his fellows established a Jesuit outpost at Shigatse in 1626.

In 1661 another Jesuit, Johann Grueber, crossed Tibet from Sining to Lhasa (where he spent a month), before heading on to Nepal. He was followed by others who built a church in Lhasa. Italian Jesuit missionary Fr. Ippolito Desideri (1716–1721) gained a particularly deep knowledge of Tibetan culture, language and Buddhism. In his many extant writings in the Classical Tibetan literary language, Fr. Desideri sought to demolish those foundations of Tibetan Buddhism, especially the doctrines of reincarnation and emptiness, that prevented Tibetan belief in the Christian God and conversion to the Catholic Church in Tibet. Fr. Desideri also deftly used conventions from Tibetan literature and passages from the dharma and vinaya to defend his thesis. Fr. Desideri was joined by Capuchins in 1707–1711, 1716–1733 and 1741–1745, Christianity was used by some Tibetan monarchs and their courts and the Karmapa sect lamas to counterbalance the influence of the Gelugpa sect in the 17th century until in 1745 when all the missionaries were expelled at the lama's insistence.

In 1877, the Protestant James Cameron from the China Inland Mission walked from Chongqing to Batang in Garzê Tibetan Autonomous Prefecture, Sichuan province, and "brought the Gospel to the Tibetan people."

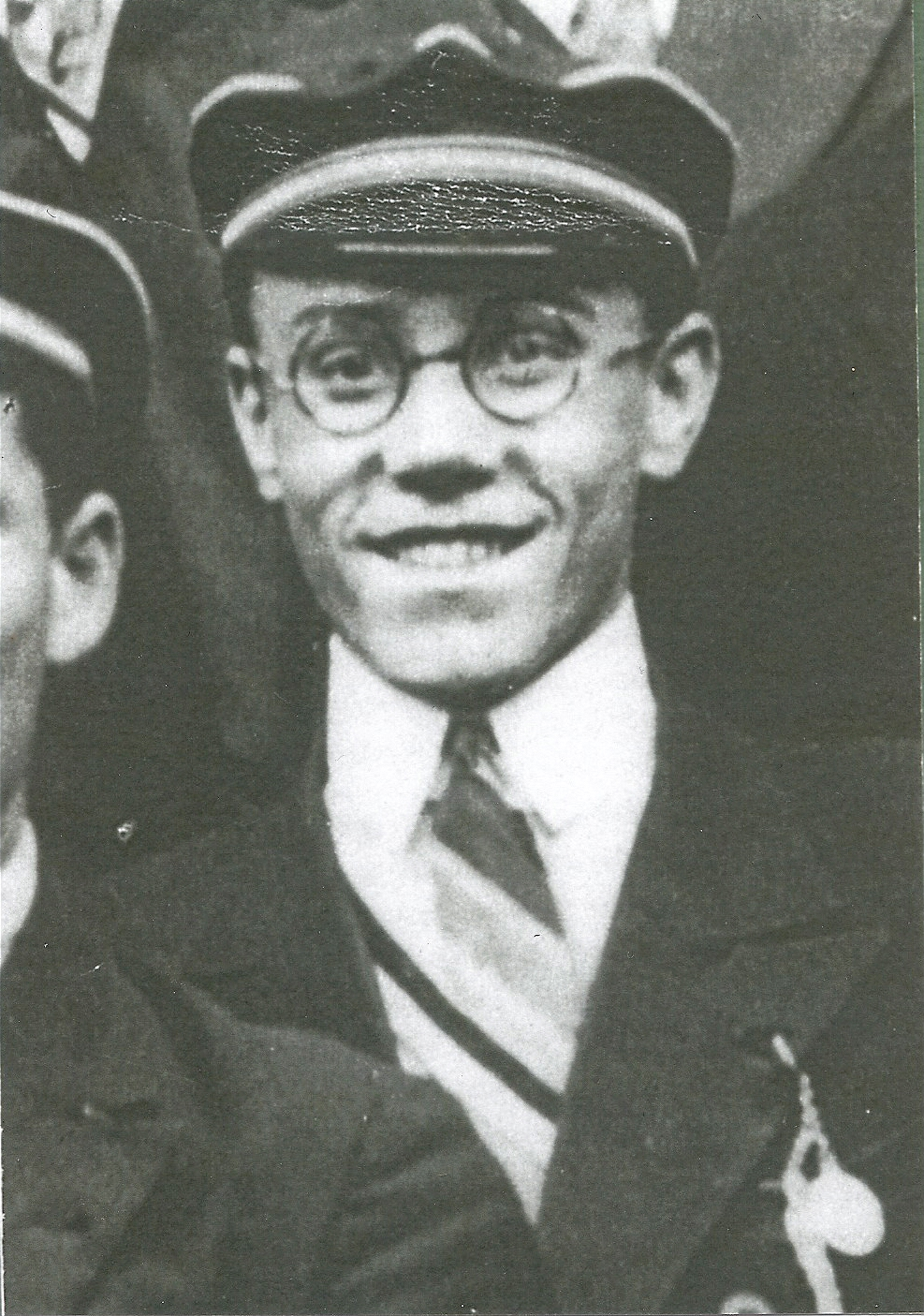
Fr. Maurice Tornay, Roman Catholic martyr

During the 1905 Tibetan Rebellion Tibetan Buddhist monks attacked, tortured and murdered French Catholic missionaries including Fr. André Soulié and massacred ethnic Tibetan Catholics, including both recent converts and those whose ancestors converted to Catholicism.

In 1949, after driving him from his parish in Yerkalo, Tibetan Buddhist monks from the Karma Gon Monastery ambushed and murdered Fr. Maurice Tornay C.R.S.A., who was travelling in disguise to Lhasa to appeal directly to the Dalai Lama for religious toleration to be granted to Tibetan Christians. Pope John Paul II beatified Fr. Tornay as a martyr for the Catholic faith on May 16, 1993.

As far as Roman Catholicism is concerned, Tibet officially belongs to the Diocese of Kangding, which has been without a Bishop since 1962. Meanwhile, in the Tibetan Autonomous Region, both the Government-controlled Chinese Patriotic Catholic Association and the pro-Vatican Underground Church have a presence, although statistics for the latter are understandably hard to come by.

With regard to Protestantism, both the Caesaropapism Three-Self Patriotic Movement and the independent House Church Movement also have a presence in Tibet, mostly in Lhasa.

== See also ==
- Buddhism in China
- Religion in China
