= Kilbourn =

Kilbourn or Kilborn may refer to:

Surname:

- Annelisa Kilbourn (1967–2002), British conservationist, veterinarian and wildlife expert
- Antony Ferdinand Kilbourn (1894–1961), American De La Salle Brother, Acting President of the De La Salle College in Manila
- Byron Kilbourn (1801–1870), American surveyor, railroad executive, and politician involved in the founding of Milwaukee, Wisconsin
- Cecil Kilborn (born 1902), English footballer
- Craig Kilborn (born 1962), American comedian, writer, producer, sports commentator, actor, media critic, and former television host
- Joanne Kilbourn, fictional Canadian detective who appears in mystery novels by Gail Bowen
- John Kilborn (1794–1878), A merchant
- Leslie Gifford Kilborn (1895–1972), the son of Omar L. Kilborn and Retta Kilborn
- Lewis Kilborn (1902–1984), the son of John Dexter Kilborn and Sarah Cahill Kilborn
- Oliver Kilbourn (1904–1993), British coal miner, painter, and founding member of the Ashington Group
- Pam Kilborn (born 1939), Australian former athlete
- Rosemary Kilbourn (born 1931), Canadian artist, printmaker and wood engraver
- Ruth Kilbourn (born 1895), Chicago-area dancer and dance teacher
- William Kilbourn, CM, FRSC (1926–1995), Canadian author and historian in Toronto, Ontario

Location:

- Kilbourn, Wisconsin, former name of the city of Wisconsin Dells in south-central Wisconsin
- Kilbourn Bridge, located just south of Kilbourn, Iowa, United States
- Kilbourn Hill or Dexter Drumlin, a 311-foot drumlin and 38-acre open space reservation in Lancaster, Massachusetts
- Abell-Kilbourn House in Martinsburg, West Virginia, associated with John N. Abell and Charles W. Kilbourn

== See also ==
- Kilbourn v. Thompson, 103 U.S. 168 (1880) was a United States Supreme Court case that dealt with the question whether or not the United States House of Representatives may compel testimony
- Kilbourne (disambiguation)
- Kilburn (disambiguation)
