= Kilborn =

Kilborn is a surname. Notable people with the surname include:

- Cecil Kilborn (1902–?), English footballer
- Craig Kilborn (born 1962), American comedian, sports and political commentator, actor and television host
- John Kilborn (1794 – after 1878), Canadian politician and judge
- Leslie Gifford Kilborn (1895–1972), Canadian missionary
- Lewis Kilborn (1902–1984)
- Michael Kilborn (born 1962), Australian cricketer
- Omar Leslie Kilborn (1867–1920), Canadian Methodist missionary and writer
- Pam Kilborn (born 1939), Australian athlete
- Stephen Kilborn, (born 1950), potter and painter
- Virginia Kilborn, Australian radio astronomer
