= Kilburn =

Kilburn may refer to:

== Places ==
- Kilburn, London, England
  - Kilburn (Brent ward), a ward in the London Borough of Brent, England
  - Kilburn (Camden ward), a ward in the London Borough of Camden, England
  - Kilburn Lane, a street in London
  - Kilburn Priory
- Kilburn, Derbyshire, England
- Kilburn, North Yorkshire, England
- Kilburn, South Australia, Australia
- Kilburn Dam in KwaZulu-Natal, South Africa

== People ==
- Kilburn (surname), including a list of people with the name
- Kilburn Wilmot (1911–1996), English cricketer

== See also ==
- Kilburn and the High Roads, a pub rock act formed in 1971 by Ian Dury
- Kilburn station (disambiguation)
- Kilbourn (disambiguation)
