= Hood Grange =

Hamlet and civil parish in North Yorkshire, England

Coordinates: 54.234°N 1.230°W

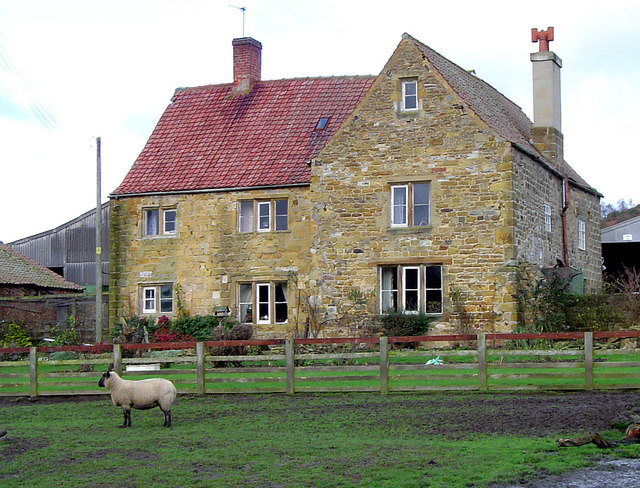
Hood Grange

Hood Grange is a hamlet and civil parish in the county of North Yorkshire, England. The population was less than 100 in the 2011 Census, so details are included in the civil parish of Sutton-under-Whitestonecliffe. The population of the parish was estimated at 10 in 2015.

From 1974 to 2023 it was part of the Hambleton District, it is now administered by the unitary North Yorkshire Council.

It is located near Thirsk at the foot of Sutton Bank, south of the larger village of Sutton-under-Whitestonecliffe and next to Hood Hill, which is to the south. It is notable for consisting of only a single household after its population decreased rapidly in the late 19th century. Hood Grange has existed as a civil parish since 1866, prior to which the area was part of Kilburn. A monastery known as Hood Abbey existed here from before 1138 until its dissolution in the 16th century.

== See also ==
- Listed buildings in Hood Grange
