= Kilbourne =

Kilbourne may refer to:

== Places ==
=== United States ===
- Kilbourne, Illinois
- Kilbourne, Louisiana
- Kilbourne, Ohio

=== United Kingdom ===
- Kilburn, Derbyshire, historically also spelled Kilbourne

== Other uses ==
- Kilbourne (DJ)
- Kilbourne (surname)
- Kilbourne High School, high school in Columbus, Ohio

== See also ==
- Kilbourn (disambiguation)
