= St John's Church, Minskip =

Church in Minskip, North Yorkshire, England

Coordinates: 54°04′28″N 1°24′31″W

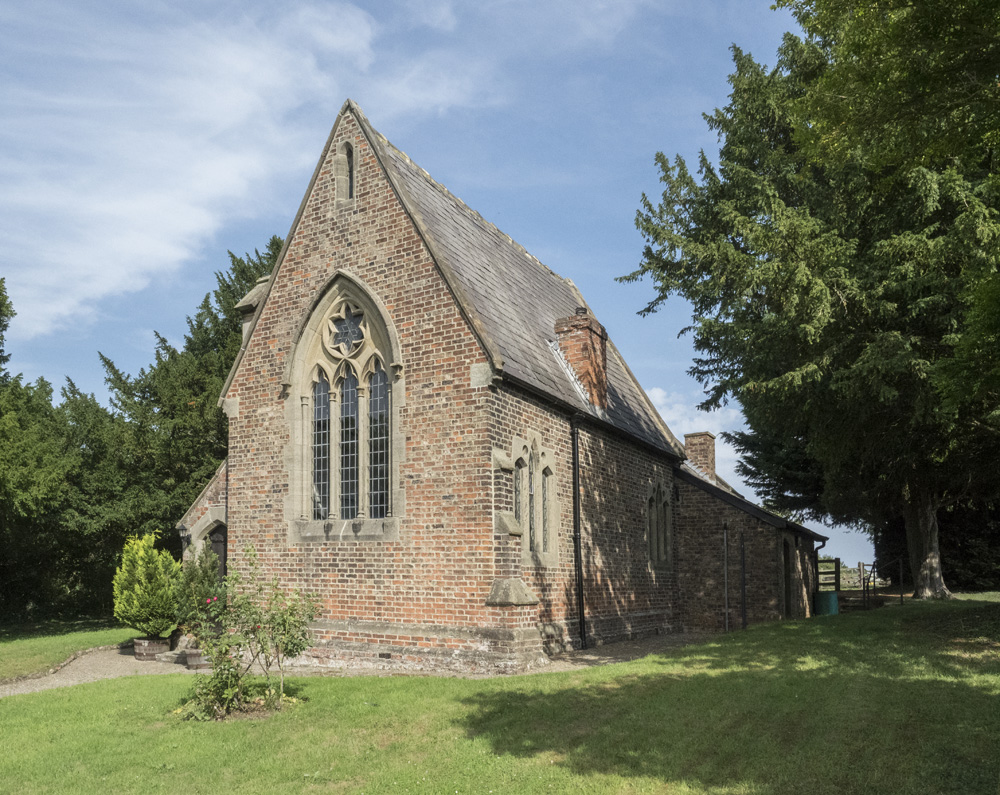
The church, in 2018

St John's Church is an Anglican church in Minskip, a village in North Yorkshire, in England.

A infants' school was built in Minskip in 1858, on the initiative of the vicar of St Andrew's Church, Aldborough. In 1907, it was converted into a chapel of ease to the church in Aldborough. In 2022, the church was awarded £3,300 by the Yorkshire Historic Churches Trust, to tackle damp and make repairs.

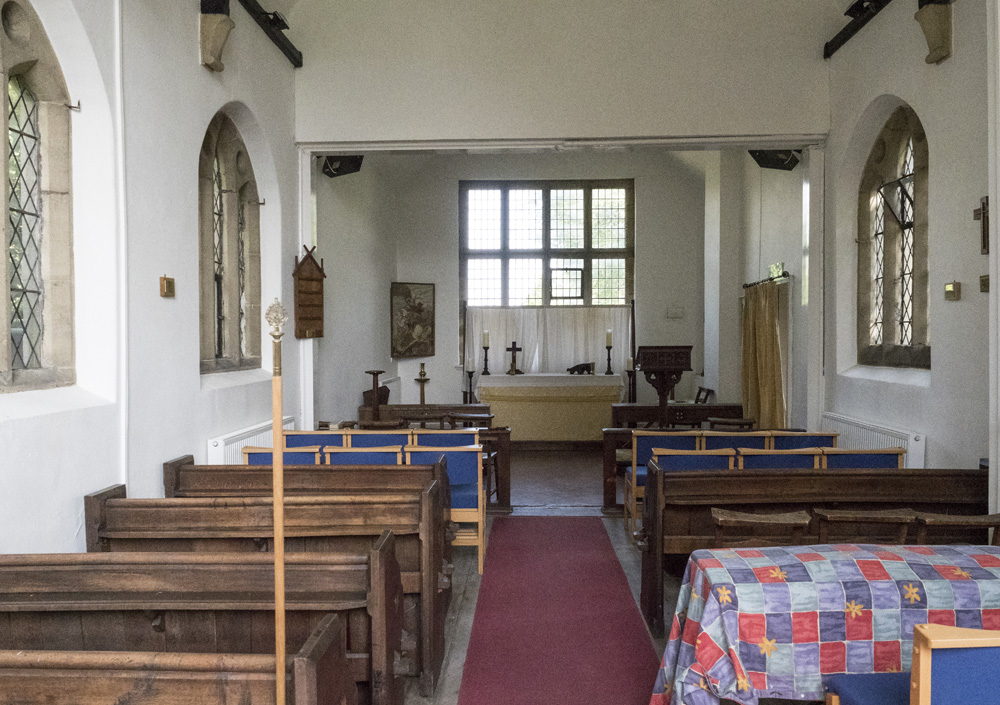
View from the nave into the chancel

The church is built of red brick, and consists of a nave, chancel and vestry, with a small bell tower. Inside, there is a chancel rail designed by Robert Thompson, and an embroidery depicting Saint George and the Dragon, which was donated in 1956.
