= Kilburn (surname) =

Kilburn is a surname. Notable people with the name include:

- Benjamin W. Kilburn (1827–1909), American photographer stereoscopic view publisher
- Clarence E. Kilburn (1893–1975), American politician, Republican member of the United States House of Representatives from New York
- Doug Kilburn (born 1930), Canadian ice hockey player
- Henry Franklin Kilburn (1844–1905), American architect
- Jim Kilburn (1909–1993), British sports journalist
- Jimmy Kilburn (1922–2008), Canadian ice hockey player
- John Kilburn (1876–1976), English-born Australian politician
- Lawrence Kilburn (1720–1775), First portrait painter in New York
- Melanie Kilburn (born 1956), English actress
- Peter Kilburn (died 1986), victim of the Lebanon hostage crisis
- Richard Kilburn (1942–2013), South African malacologist
- Sam Kilburn (1868–1940), English cricketer
- Samuel Smith Kilburn (1831–1903), American engraver
- Steve Kilburn (born 1963), Australian politician, Australian Labor Party member of the Legislative Assembly of Queensland
- Terry Kilburn (born 1926), English-American former child actor
- Tom Kilburn (1921–2001), British engineer and co-inventor of the first stored program computer
- William Kilburn (1745–1818), English illustrator for William Curtis' Flora Londinensis
- William Edward Kilburn (1818–1891), English photographer

== See also ==
- George Goodwin Kilburne (1839–1924), English painter
- Richard Kilburne (1605–1678), English antiquarian
