= Kilbourne (surname) =

Kilbourne is a surname. Notable people with the surname include:

- Ashe Kilbourne, DJ
- Amos Kilbourne, English footballer
- Charles E. Kilbourne (1872–1963), United States Army general
- Edward C. Kilbourne (1856–1959)
- Edwin D. Kilbourne (1920–2011), American scientist
- Ernest A. Kilbourne (1865–1928), American missionary
- James Kilbourne (1770–1850), American surveyor and politician
- Jean Kilbourne (born 1943), American writer
- Warren Kilbourne (1916–1967), American football player
- Wendy Kilbourne (born 1964), American actress
