= Listed buildings in Kilburn High and Low =

Kilburn High and Low is a civil parish in the county of North Yorkshire, England. It contains 19 listed buildings that are recorded in the National Heritage List for England. Of these, one is listed at Grade II*, the middle of the three grades, and the others are at Grade II, the lowest grade. The parish contains the village of Kilburn and the surrounding countryside. The listed buildings include houses and associated structures, farm buildings, a church, a mounting block, a former school, a pump and a war memorial.

== Key ==
Grade	Criteria
II*	Particularly important buildings of more than special interest
II	Buildings of national importance and special interest

== Buildings ==
Name and location	Photograph	Date	Notes	Grade
St Mary's Church; 54.21025°N 1.21392°W		12th century	The church has been altered and extended through the centuries, including a restoration in 1869 by Ewan Christian. It is built in stone with Welsh slate roofs, and consists of a nave, a north aisle, a south porch, a north vestry, a chancel with a north chapel, and a west tower. The tower has a chamfered plinth, quoins, diagonal buttresses, a west window, two-light bell openings, and an embattled parapet with crocketed corner finials. The porch has a sundial in the gable, and the inner doorway has a round arch with three orders of chevrons on columns with decorated cushion capitals.	II*
Robert Thompson's Craftsmen; 54.21021°N 1.21483°W		16th century	The house, later used for other purposes, has a timber framed core, later partly clad in stone and mottled pink brick, with a tall plinth, and a stone slate roof, hipped on the right. There are two storeys and four bays, and aisles at the rear and on the right. On the front are doorways, in the left bay is a canted bay window, and the other windows are a mix, including a cross window, a square window, horizontally-sliding sashes, and casements.	II
Barn northwest of Village Farm; 54.21055°N 1.21606°W	—	16th century (probable)	The barn has a cruck frame, it is encased in stone, and has quoins, and a steeply pitched swept roof. Its openings include a doorway, a row of square holes, and bird holes in a triangular pattern, and inside here are three pairs of crucks.	II
Kilburn Hall; 54.20819°N 1.21361°W	—	Mid to late 17th century	The house was extended in the 18th century, resulting in an L-shaped plan, and it has a pantile roof. The earlier wing on the right has two storeys and attics and six bays, it is rendered, on a plinth, and has quoins. In the centre is a doorway and most of the windows are cross windows. On the gable end facing the street is a mullioned and transomed window with a hood mould, above which is a coat of arms and blocked windows. The later range is in stone, and has two storeys and four bays. The right bay contains a round-arched doorway in an architrave with imposts and a rusticated head. In the centre of the other bays is a doorway with a rusticated surround, and the windows are sashes.	II
Barns north of Kilburn Hall; 54.20831°N 1.21375°W	—	Mid to late 17th century	The building consists of the former north wing of the hall and a later barn attached further to the north, forming a T-shaped plan. It is in stone, the wing with a pantile roof, and the barn with a stone slate roof. The wing has two storeys and quoins. It contains a doorway with a chamfered quoined surround and a triangular head, and the windows are mullioned. The barn has one storey and an attic, and two bays. On the right is a cart entry with an elliptical arch and a keystone, and in the attic are gabled dormers.	II
Blacksmith's Cottage and outbuilding 54.20993°N 1.21518°W		Mid to late 17th century	The house and the lower outbuilding to the left are in stone, the house with a tile roof, and the outbuilding roof in pantile. Both have two storeys and two bays. The house has a central doorway, and the windows in both parts are horizontally-sliding sashes.	II
Middle Kilburn Park; 54.20413°N 1.24071°W	—	Mid 18th century	The farmhouse is in limestone and sandstone on a plinth, with quoins, an eaves band, and a tile roof with stone copings and shaped kneelers. There are two storeys and an attic, and three bays. In the garden front is a doorway with a moulded architrave, and the windows are sashes with keystones. At the rear is a doorway with a chamfered quoined surround and a camber-arched lintel, and the windows are horizontally-sliding sashes with keystones.	II
Mount Pleasant; 54.20929°N 1.20907°W	—	Mid 18th century	A farmhouse, later a private house, in stone on a plinth, with an eaves band, and a tile roof with stone copings and shaped kneelers. There are two storeys and an attic, three bays, and a rear wing and outshut. The central doorway has a fanlight, and the windows are sashes with keystones.	II
Stable northeast of Mount Pleasant; 54.20938°N 1.20873°W	—	Mid 18th century	The stable is in stone, with quoins, and a tile roof with stone coping and shaped kneelers. There are two bays and a right outshut, and the openings include a stable door and slit vents.	II
Mounting block 54.20989°N 1.21400°W		18th century (probable)	The mounting block to the south of the entrance to the churchyard of St Mary's Church is in stone. It consists of four steps leading up to a platform, the lower one detached.	II
Suncliffe Grange; 54.20698°N 1.19328°W		Mid 18th century	The farmhouse is in stone, and has a pantile roof with stone copings and shaped kneelers. It consists of a main range with two storeys and attics, a double depth plan and three bays, and a lower recessed wing on the left with two storeys and four bays. The main range has a chamfered plinth, an eaves band, and it contains a central doorway. Most of the windows are sashes, all have keystones, and in the attic are gabled windows.	II
Temple House, wall and railings 54.21023°N 1.20795°W		Mid 18th century	The house is in mottled pink brick, with a sill band, a floor band, a cornice, a stone-coped parapet and a blue slate roof. There are two storeys, three bays, and a rear wing. The central doorway has a stone architrave and a cornice on consoles, above which is a sash window, and the outer bays contain Venetian windows. In front of the house is a low rendered wall with cast iron railings and a gate.	II
South Kilburn Park and outbuilding 54.19743°N 1.23341°W	—	Late 18th century	The farmhouse, which incorporates earlier material, is in limestone on a plinth, with sandstone quoins, an eaves band, and a slate roof with copings and shaped kneelers. There are two storeys and an attic, a main range with three bays, flanked by two-storey two-bay wings, a two-storey rear wing, and a single-storey block in the angle. The central doorway has a fanlight, and the windows are sashes. At the rear of the outbuilding is a dated quoin.	II
Weatherill Barn; 54.20650°N 1.20295°W		Late 18th century	The field barn and stable are in stone, with quoins, and pantile roofs with stone coping and shaped kneelers. They consist of a barn with three bays, and a lower two-bay stable to the west, and contain doorways and slit vents.	II
Wall and ha-ha, South Kilburn Park; 54.19749°N 1.23377°W	—	1798 (probable)	The garden wall and ha-ha are in stone. The ha-ha has flat coping, it is about 0.75 metres (2 ft 6 in) high, and curves in a bow. It ramps up to the garden wall which is between 1.5 metres (4 ft 11 in) and 3 metres (9.8 ft) high. The wall contains a gateway with square piers on plinths with chamfered capstones.	II
Whitehorse View and The Old School; 54.21002°N 1.21537°W		Early 19th century	A pair of houses in stone, with a swept pantile roof, stone coping an shaped kneelers. There are two storeys, each house has two bays, and at the rear is a continuous outshut. Each house has a central doorway, and the windows are sashes.	II
Former School; 54.20957°N 1.21407°W		1841	The school, later used for other purposes, is in stone, with oversailing eaves and a purple slate roof. There is a single story and an E-shaped plan, with four bays, the outer bays and the central porch projecting and gabled. The windows are horizontally-sliding sashes. In the left gable is a square plaque, and above it is a rectangular opening with a bell.	II
Water pump 54.20999°N 1.20846°W		Late 19th century	The pump is in cast iron, and consists of a fluted cylindrical shaft with a step at the base. It has a lion's-head spout, and a hemispherical fluted cap with a pump knob on one side and a bud finial.	II
War memorial 54.20989°N 1.21389°W		1922	The war memorial is set into a wall to the south of St Mary's Church, and is in sandstone. It was designed by Robert Thompson and carved by Charles Barker, and consists of a bust of a soldier on a pedestal with dates. This is set on a square column with a chamfered plinth, containing a recessed panel with the names of those lost in the First World War, above which is an inscribed block.	II
