= John F. Dolan =

American politician (1922–2013)

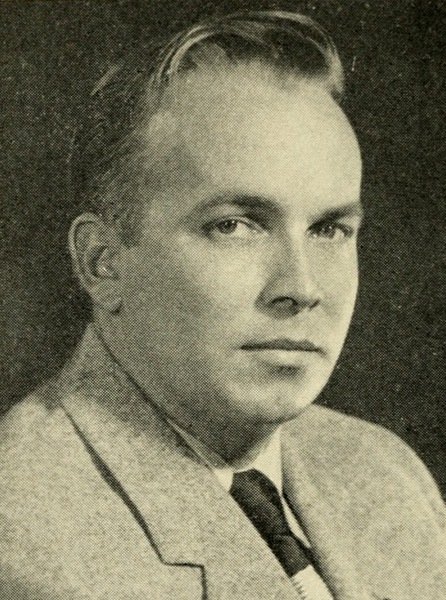
John Francis Dolan in 1953

John F. Dolan (1922–2013) was a longtime member of the Massachusetts State Legislature and an advocate of conservation. During his tenure in office as a State Representative, Dolan helped create groundbreaking legislation for the conservation of natural resources in the State of Massachusetts.

== Early life and military service ==
Dolan was born in Ipswich, Massachusetts, on September 7, 1922, and was the oldest child of Charles L. Dolan and Rose Kilborn. Often called "Jack" from the time of childhood, Dolan spent his early years on Grape Island (Essex County, Massachusetts) where his mother's family had resided for many years. Dolan's uncle was Lewis Kilborn, who would later become the island's last living residents. During the early years of the 20th Century, Grape Island was home to numerous families, most of whom made their living digging clams or fishing in the Atlantic or the nearby rivers. As Dolan would later remember, "My first chore was to keep the wood box behind the stove full. When the big wood box was half full, sometimes I would crawl in and take a nap."

In the early 1930s, Dolan's father moved the family off the island and into a residence in Ipswich proper. The transition proved difficult for Dolan's mother who would suffer a nervous breakdown. In 1934, Jack Dolan was sent to live at the Hillside School for Boys in Marlborough, Massachusetts, where he would remain until his enlistment in the US Navy in 1942. During the Second World War Dolan would serve on board the transport vessel USS Pastores and later as a gun crew captain on the USS Chicago. In July 1945, Dolan and his shipmates on board the Chicago participated in the first naval bombardment of Japan against the Kamaishi Industrial District. After the war, Dolan returned to Ipswich, where he married Lucy Eustace and soon entered local politics.

== Political career ==
While still a member of the US Naval Reserve, Dolan served in a local veteran's affairs office and was later elected to the office of Town Clerk in Ipswich. When the Korean War began in the summer of 1950, Dolan was recalled to active duty with the US Navy and was stationed in Japan. However, the death of his younger brother James F. Dolan during the Battle of Taejon led to Dolan's eventual discharge from active duty and he soon returned to Ipswich to continue raising his family and pursuing a career in state politics.

In 1957, Dolan filed the bill that would become the Conservation Commission Act, legislation that enabled communities throughout Massachusetts to create conservation commissions in order to protect natural resources. By the following year, a dozen towns, including Ipswich had formed commissions based on Dolan's bill. Today, every city and town in Massachusetts has their own conservation commission. Dolan would go on to serve his district until the early 1970s and held his seat in the Massachusetts Legislature for nine consecutive terms. His tenure in office eventually came to an end after casting the deciding vote on a measure that would have reduced the size of the House assembly. The unpopular move lead to his defeat in the following year's primary.

== Later life ==
After his defeat in the 1971 primaries, Dolan continued as director for Committee on Natural Resources until his retirement in the late 1970s. Dolan spent the remainder of his life in Ipswich, digging clams and enjoying time with his grandchildren and a great-grandson who was named in his honor. Dolan also wrote a series of historical articles for the Ipswich Chronicle in the 1990s. One of his grandsons is Samuel K. Dolan, an Emmy Award winning documentary producer and author. John F. Dolan died at his home in Ipswich at the age of 90 on May 24, 2013.

== See also ==
- 1953–1954 Massachusetts legislature
- 1955–1956 Massachusetts legislature
