= Mouseman Visitor Centre =

Building in Kilburn, North Yorkshire, England

Coordinates: 54.2102°N 1.2148°W

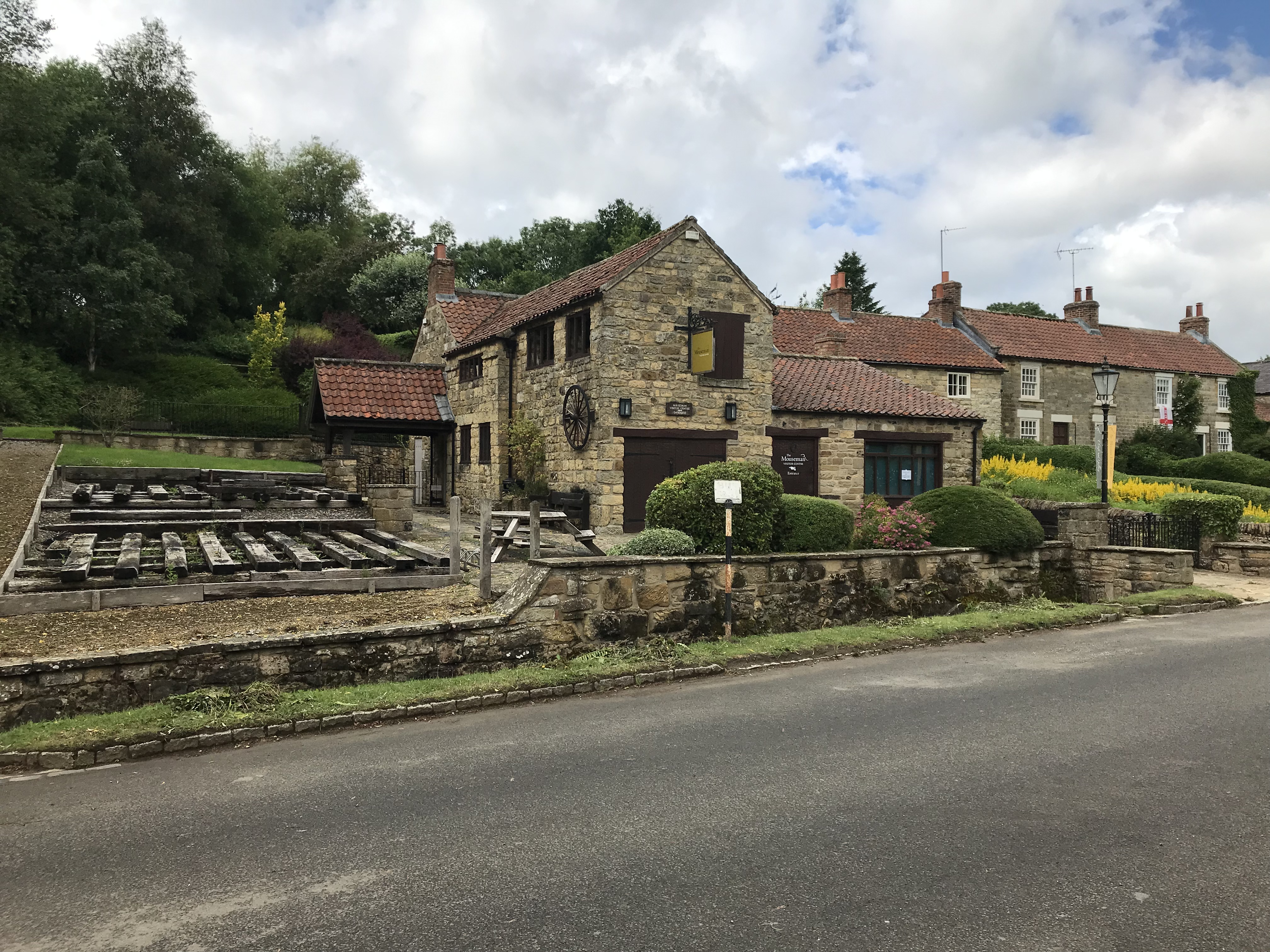
The main building, in 2021

The Mouseman Visitor Centre is a tourist attraction in Kilburn, North Yorkshire, a village in England.

The centre displays pieces carved by the furniture designer Robert Thompson, known as "Mouseman" for including carvings of mice on his work. The core of the centre is Thompson's former workshop and an adjoining blacksmith's shop. These were opened to the public in 1994 by Thompson's descendent Ian Thompson-Cartwright. It was redesigned between 2002 and 2004, to include a display of furniture designed by Thompson, gallery from which the current furniture workshop can be viewed, and exhibition relating to life in the village during Thompson's youth. The complex also included a cafe and a house which served as the furniture company's design department and showroom. The cafe and exhibition closed during the COVID-19 pandemic.

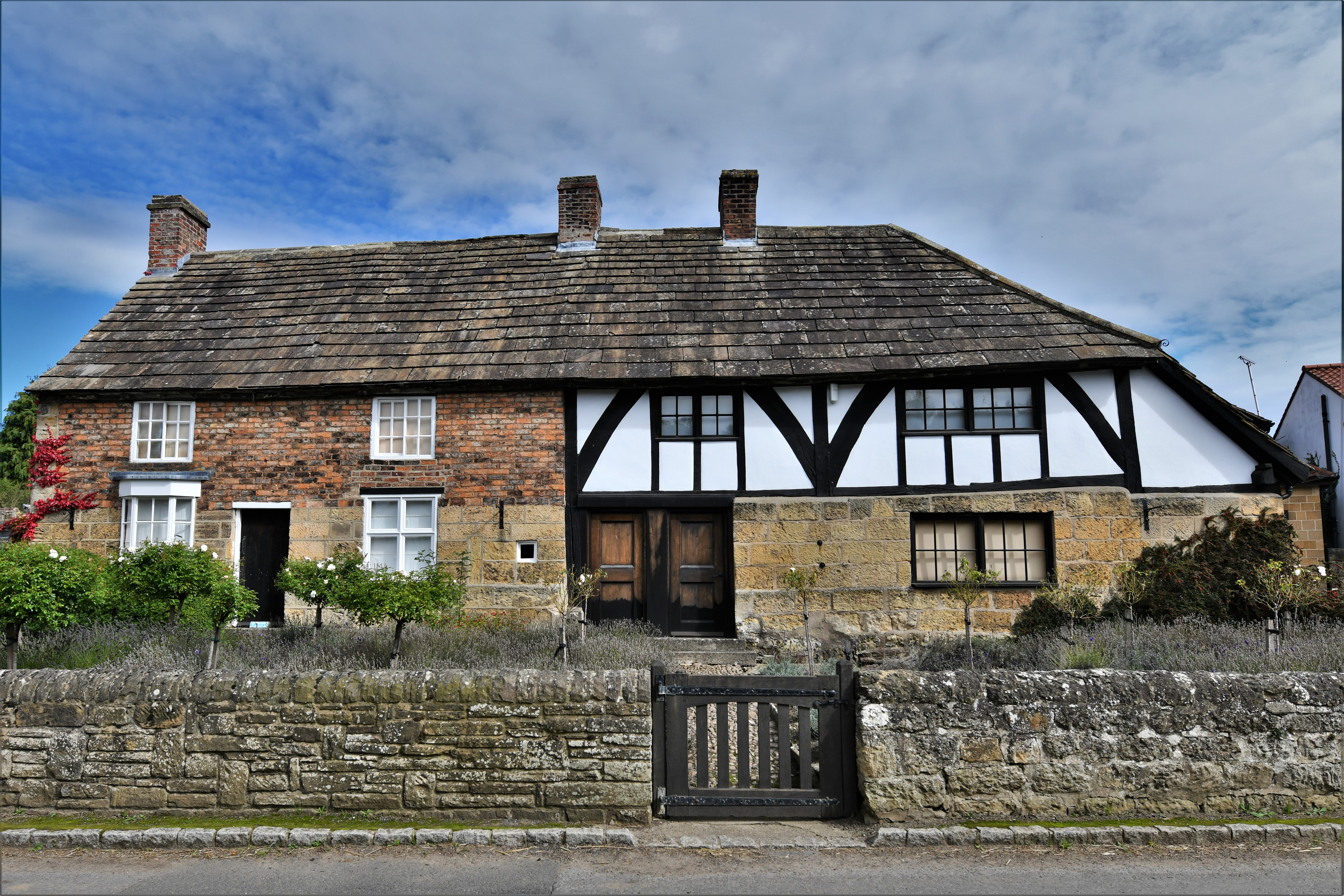
The house, in 2018

The house was built in the 16th century and is grade II listed. It has a timber framed core, later partly clad in stone and mottled pink brick, with a tall plinth, and a stone slate roof, hipped on the right. There are two storeys and four bays, and aisles at the rear and on the right. On the front are doorways, in the left bay is a canted bay window, and the other windows are a mix, including a cross window, a square window, horizontally-sliding sashes, and casements.

== See also ==
- Listed buildings in Kilburn High and Low
