= Desborough =

Town in North Northamptonshire, England

Coordinates: 52.4398°N 0.8172°W

- Location within Northamptonshire
- Population: 11,910 (2021)
- OS grid reference: SP805835
- Civil parish: Desborough
- Unitary authority: North Northamptonshire
- Ceremonial county: Northamptonshire
- Region: East Midlands
- Country: England
- Sovereign state: United Kingdom
- Post town: KETTERING
- Postcode district: NN14
- Dialling code: 01536
- Police: Northamptonshire
- Fire: Northamptonshire
- Ambulance: East Midlands
- UK Parliament: Kettering

Desborough is a town and civil parish in North Northamptonshire, England, lying in the Ise Valley between Market Harborough and Kettering. It was an industrial centre for weaving and shoe-making in the 19th century and had a long association with the Co-operative movement.

== History ==
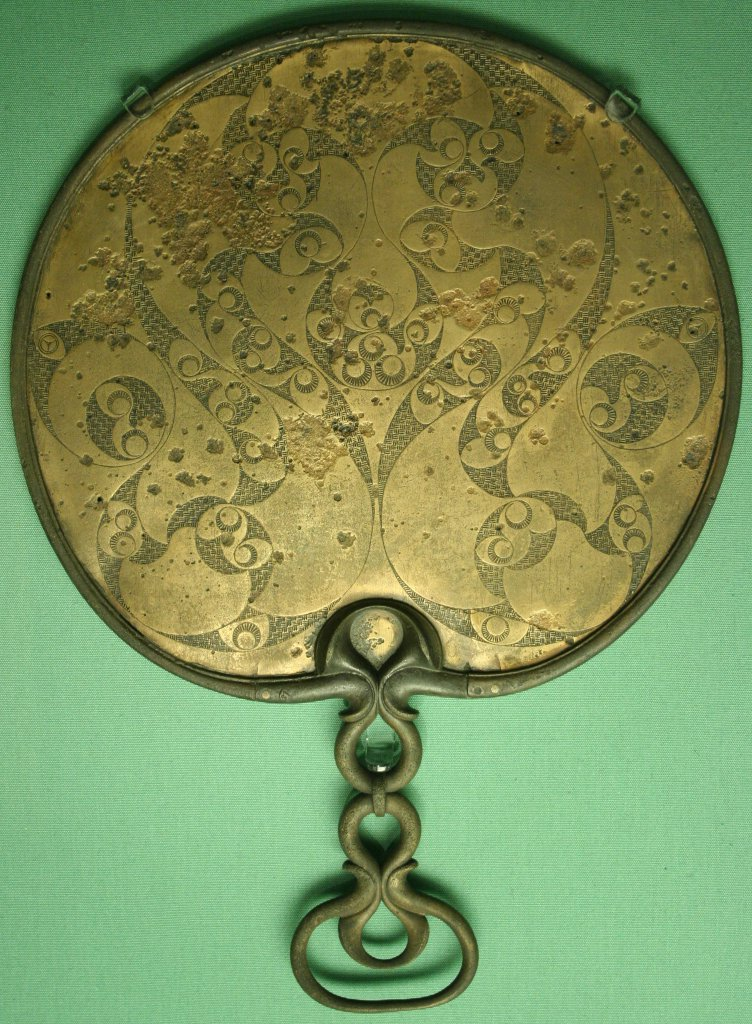
The Celtic Desborough Mirror, British Museum

Desborough's origins lie in the Bronze Age of about 2000 BC. Urns from that period have been found in and around the town.

Many archaeological finds from the Iron Age and the Anglo-Saxon period have also been made. Some, such as the 1st-century Desborough Mirror and the Anglo-Saxon Desborough Necklace, are now in the possession of the British Museum.

The Anglo-Saxon Desborough Necklace, British Museum

Domesday Book (1086) refers to Desborough as a "place of judgement". The name itself is thought to have derived from 'Disburg', which meant a sacred and fortified place. In the High Street centrepiece of what is now the Market Square stands a pillar that is called locally the Town Cross, though it is a square column topped by a stone ball. It is thought to have served as a gateway pillar from Harrington Hall.

From the 17th century, Desborough developed around the spinning and weaving industries. The town's factories used local wool and flax to produce fine cloth and linen until the mid-19th century. Silk weaving then developed in a Paddock Lane factory and shoe-making also gained importance.

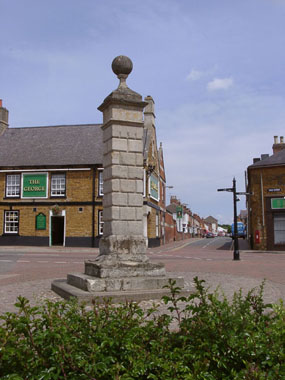
The Cross, Desborough

== Transport ==
Desborough lies five miles (8 km) south-east of Market Harborough, north-west of Kettering, and south-west of Corby. The A6 Rothwell–Desborough bypass opened on 14 August 2003.

Between 1857 and 1968, Desborough had a railway station, opened and operated by the Midland Railway (later the London, Midland and Scottish Railway and, after nationalisation, British Rail). This was part of an extension of its network from Leicester to Bedford and Hitchin, but it was closed under the Beeching cuts.

== Churches ==
Desborough has an Anglican parish church, St Giles's, along with a Baptist church, a United Reformed Church, and the Roman Catholic Church of the Holy Trinity.

St Giles's Church (Anglican) is the oldest surviving building in the town, dating from about 1225. It is believed to stand on the site of an earlier Saxon church. Its relics from the town's history include part of an Anglo-Saxon cross carved from stone, a Tudor rood screen, and reminders of the English Civil War. Close by the church is the 18th-century Church House, with stuccoed Doric pillars. This became Desborough House in the 19th century and is now the Services Club.

=== Partnership ===
On 7 September 1969, an Anglican/ Methodist partnership was inaugurated in the presence of the Bishop of Peterborough and the Chairman of the Oxford District. Since then a Methodist minister has been working in partnership with the Anglican vicar. St Giles is part of the Anglican united benefice of Desborough and Brampton Ash with Braybrooke and Dingley. It has regular church festivals, including one of the United Kingdom's largest and longest-running Christmas tree festivals (over 100 trees, held since 1998). The trees are contributed by local organisations, companies, families and individuals.

The Kettering Leg of the annual Student Cross pilgrimage to Walsingham starts near Desborough.

== Government and community ==
Governance of Desborough lies (in descending order) with the North Northamptonshire Unitary Council (From April 2021) and the local Desborough Town Council.

Desborough belongs to the Charter of European Rural Communities, which links it to 27 other EU member towns and villages. It is twinned with Neuville de Poitou in the Vienne department of France and with Bièvre in the Walloon region of Belgium.

The Desborough Community Development Trust campaigns for improvements to the town.

== Co-operative movement ==
With the intention of preventing exploitation of workers by agents and employers, local men founded the Desborough Co-operative Society in 1863. Starting with local shops and then a corset and lingerie factory, the Desborough Co-op once had a department store, a bank, a supermarket, a travel agents, a ladies' shoe and clothing shop and a number of corner stores.

After several mergers, the town is now served by the Central England Co-op. Over the years, a number of its functions have ceased, including the bank branch and the ladies' shoe and clothing shop. However, a Co-operative undertakers has opened in one of the former corner shops.

The former Co-op Corset Factory, now owned by Wacoal Eveden Ltd makes lingerie and swimwear. The site includes the original Victorian factory, and immediately opposite, Eveden's warehousing and UK factory shop. The former Co-operative Society Sports Ground with a football field and tennis courts is now covered by a housing development, Desbeau Park – Desbeau being the name of a range of lingerie made at the Corset Factory.

== Sport and leisure ==
Desborough has a Non-League football team, Desborough Town F.C., which plays at Waterworks Field.

The town's leisure complex was built in the later months of 2012. It holds a gym, a café, a football court, a basketball court and an outside skate park.

Every Sunday morning, local volunteers organise Desborough Greenspace junior parkrun held a Desborough leisure centre, a free 2km event aimed at increasing physical activity in children aged 4-14 years and providing volunteering opportunities within the community for all ages. In 2019 it won the then Kettering Borough Council community project of the year, followed by the Northamptonshire Sport award for the countywide community project of the year

== Media ==
Local news and television programmes are provided by BBC East and ITV Anglia. Television signals are received from the Sandy Heath TV transmitter.

Local radio stations are BBC Radio Northampton, Heart East, Smooth East Midlands (formerly Connect FM) and Shire Sounds, community based radio station.

The town is served by these local newspapers, Northamptonshire Evening Telegraph, Harborough Mail and Northampton Chronicle and Echo.

== Education ==
The town has a primary school-cum-infant/junior school, consisting of Loatlands Primary and combined Havelock Infant and Junior schools. Secondary education takes place outside the town.

== Notable residents ==
In birth order:

- John Reynolds (fl. 1600s), a tinker known as "Captain Pouch" and a leader of the 1607 anti-enclosure Midland Revolt, was said to be from Desborough.
- Jane West (1758–1852), novelist, poet and writer of conduct literature, was brought up in Desborough.
- Lewis Cave (1832–1897), a Queen's Bench judge, was born in Desborough.
- Lawrence Holland (1887–1956), played cricket for Northamptonshire and died in Desborough.
- F. R. G. Heaf (1894–1973), professor of medicine and tuberculosis researcher, was born in the town.
- Cecil Kilborn, a Bradford City footballer in 1919–1924, was born in Desborough in 1902.
- Reggie Meen (1907–1984), heavyweight boxer, won the British title in 1931.
