= St Mary's Church, Kilburn =

Church in Kilburn, North Yorkshire, England

Coordinates: 54°12′37″N 1°12′50″W

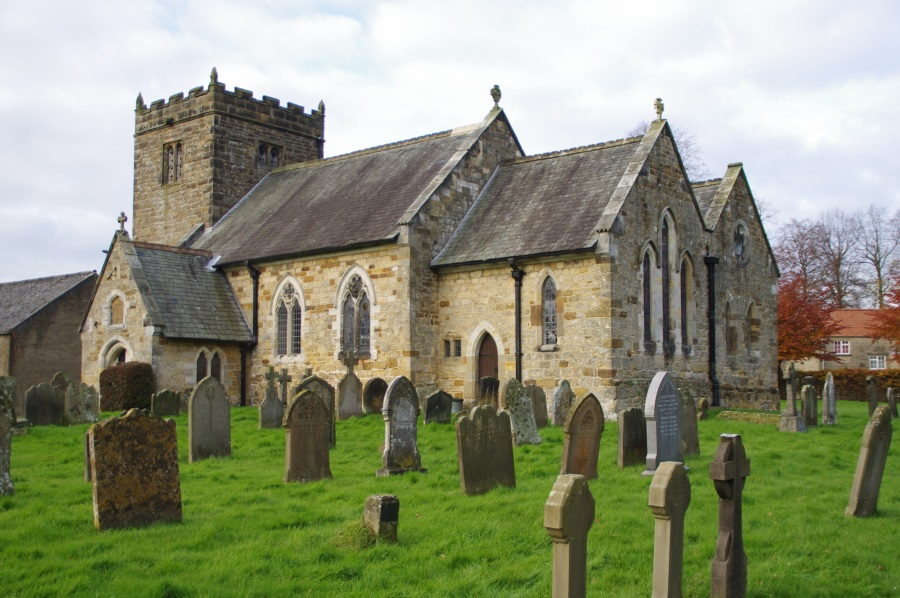
The church, in 2013

St Mary's Church is an Anglican church in Kilburn, North Yorkshire, a village in England.

The church was originally a chapel of ease to Coxwold, built in the 12th century. It was altered in the 13th century, and the tower was added in 1667. The building was restored in 1818, and by Ewan Christian in 1869. It was given its own parish in 1868. The building was grade II* listed in 1966.

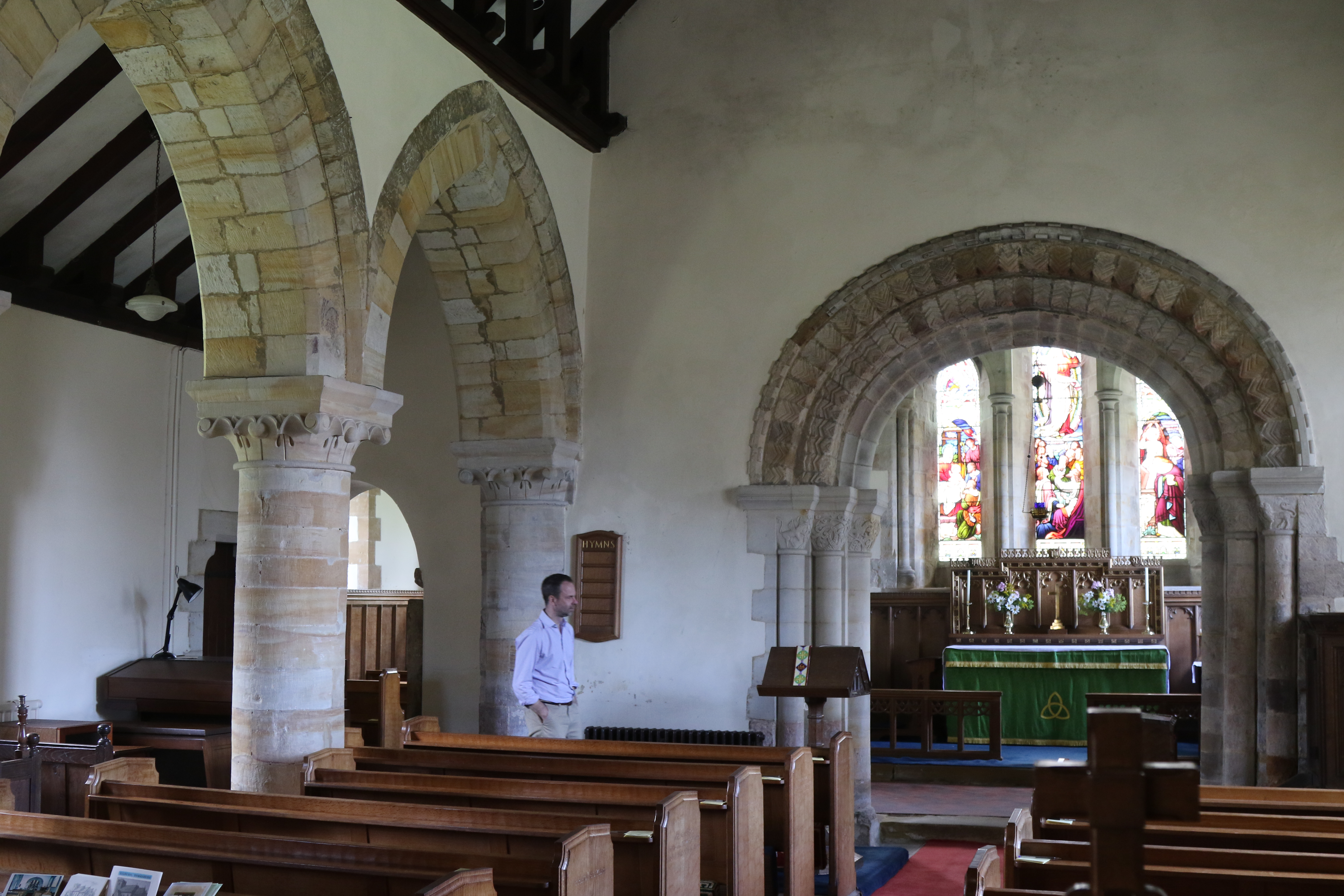
The nave and aisle

The church is built of stone with Welsh slate roofs, and consists of a nave, a north aisle, a south porch, a north vestry, a chancel with a north chapel, and a west tower. The tower has a chamfered plinth, quoins, diagonal buttresses, a west window, two-light bell openings, and an embattled parapet with crocketed corner finials. The porch has a sundial in the gable, and the inner doorway has a round arch with three orders of chevrons on columns with decorated cushion capitals. Inside, there are two 13th-century grave slabs, pews which are probably 17th century, and a bell with the date 1684.

== See also ==
- Grade II* listed churches in North Yorkshire (district)
- Listed buildings in Kilburn High and Low
