= Lawrence Holland (cricketer) =

English cricketer

Lawrence Edward Holland
- Born: January 17, 1887; Tinsley, Sheffield
- Died: July 3, 1956 (aged 69)
- Occupation: English Cricketer

Lawrence Edward Holland was an English cricketer active from 1912 to 1920 who played for Northamptonshire (Northants). He was born in Tinsley, Sheffield, on 17 January 1887 and died in Desborough, Northamptonshire, on 3 July 1956. He appeared in ten first-class matches as a righthanded batsman who bowled right arm slow. He scored 202 runs with a highest score of 63 and took six wickets with a best performance of three for 26.
