= Listed buildings in Hood Grange =

Hood Grange is a civil parish in the county of North Yorkshire, England. It contains two listed buildings that are recorded in the National Heritage List for England. Both the listed buildings are designated at Grade II, the lowest of the three grades, which is applied to "buildings of national importance and special interest". The parish contains the hamlet of Hood Grange and the surrounding countryside, and the listed buildings consist of a farmhouse and an outbuilding.

== Buildings ==
Name and location	Photograph	Date	Notes
Outbuilding west of Hood Grange Farmhouse; 54.23396°N 1.22794°W		16th century	The outbuilding has a timber framed core, it has been encased in stone, and has a tile roof. There is a single storey and a partial loft, and fronts of two and three bays. The garden front is gabled, some of the upper part is in brick, and it contains a large 20th-century window.
Hood Grange Farmhouse; 54.23396°N 1.22763°W		17th century	The farmhouse is in stone with quoins and a pantile roof. There are two storeys and an attic, two bays, and a gabled cross-wing on the right. The doorway has a fanlight and an angled canopy. Most of the windows in the main block are mullioned, and elsewhere there are horizontally-sliding sashes and a cross window. At the rear is an oculus with sunken upper spandrels and a hood mould.
