= Hood Abbey =

Abbey in North Yorkshire, England

Coordinates: 54°14′02.9″N 1°13′39.0″W

Hood Abbey was an abbey on the grounds of today's Hood Grange, North Yorkshire, England. The abbey at Hood was known to be in existence as a hermitage since before 1138 when Roger de Mowbray granted it to a group of Savignian monks, who stayed for five years before relocating to Byland Abbey. After this, it was inhabited by monks from the Bridlington area who came west to take over Roger de Mowbray's newest priory at Newburgh.

The site was dissolved in the 16th century, and all that remains are two windows incorporated into one of the barns which now occupy the site.
