= Nathaniel Dexter =

Nathaniel Dexter, "town father" of Lancaster, Massachusetts, USA, donated what is known as Dexter Drumlin to The Trustees of Reservations. After his death he was hailed as "a beloved supporter of The Trustees and active member of the Lancaster community". The Nathaniel Dexter Meeting Room on the lower level of the Lancaster town library also bears his name. The Bostonian Society has possession of his family papers from 1820 to 1963.
