= Sam Kilburn =

English cricketer

Sam Kilburn (16 October 1868 – 25 September 1940) was an English first-class cricketer, who played one match for Yorkshire County Cricket Club, against Essex at Bradford Park Avenue, in 1896.
