= Virginia Kilborn =

Radio astronomer

Virginia Kilborn is a professor and radio astronomer with the Centre for Astrophysics and Supercomputing at Swinburne University and is Swinburne's first Chief Scientist. She researches galaxy evolution by studying their gas content and is working on the surveys of the next generation of radio telescopes, including the Australian SKA Pathfinder.

== Career ==
Kilborn peered through her first telescope in 1986 to watch Halley's Comet, a once in 75 year event.

She completed her PhD at the University of Melbourne before undertaking post-doctoral research at Jodrell Bank observatory in England.

Kilborn then undertook an ARC-CSIRO linkage fellowship at Swinburne's Centre for Astrophysics and Supercomputing (CAS) in Melbourne in 2003. She began teaching the Swinburne Astronomy online program in 2006, lecturing in undergraduate Astronomy. She became deputy director from 2011 to 2013 and acting director for CAS in 2013. In 2015 Kilborn became Chair of the Department of Physics and Astronomy before becoming dean of science in 2019, remaining in that role until her appointment as Swinburne's first Chief Scientist in May 2021.

Kilborn served as president of the Astronomical Society of Australia from 2015 to 2017 and, as of October 2022, is chair of the National Committee for Astronomy for the Australian Academy of Science.

Kilborn also leads many gender equity initiatives. She is chair of the CAS equity committee and a leader of university-wide programs to promote academic women and their careers.

== Awards and recognition ==
- Honorary Fellow, Astronomical Society of Australia, 2022
- Vice-Chancellors Award for Culture and Values, Swinburne, 2015
- Vice-Chancellors Teaching Award (team SAO), Swinburne, 2012
- National, OLT Citation for Outstanding contributions to student learning, SAO core team, Swinburne, 2012
- Vice-Chancellors Early Career Research Award, Swinburne 2006
