= Retta Gifford =

Mary Alfretta Gifford Kilborn
- Born: Mary Alfretta Gifford; 1863 or 1864; Meaford, Ontario, Canada
- Died: 1 December 1942; Toronto, Ontario, Canada
- Occupations: Physician, medical missionary
- Spouse: Omar Leslie Kilborn
- Children: Leslie Gifford Kilborn and others

Mary Alfretta "Retta" Gifford Kilborn (1863 or 1864 – 1 December 1942) was a Canadian physician and medical missionary who served in Sichuan (then Szechwan), China, from 1893 until her retirement in the early 1930s. She was the first medical woman appointed to the Canadian Methodist West China Mission and founded a hospital for women in Chengdu, later known as Renji Hospital (仁济医院). She also served on the faculty of West China Union University.

== Early life and education ==
Gifford was born in Meaford, Ontario, the eldest of eight children in a farming family. She studied medicine at the Woman’s Medical College in Toronto (later absorbed into Trinity College) and graduated in 1891 with the degrees of M.D., C.M.

After a brief period of medical practice in Owen Sound, Ontario, she accepted appointment with the Woman’s Missionary Society (WMS) of the Methodist Church of Canada and departed for West China in 1893.

== Medical mission in Sichuan ==
Gifford arrived in Chengdu in May 1893. Within two months she married Dr. Omar Leslie Kilborn, leader of the Canadian Methodist West China Mission. Although the Woman’s Missionary Society did not require her resignation, the Board of Managers formally reprimanded her for breach of contract and reduced her salary, reflecting restrictions commonly placed on married women missionaries.

Following her marriage, the Kilborns were assigned to Kiating, where she established a dispensary for the WMS. After returning to Chengdu, she opened a hospital for women in 1896 to provide medical care to female patients who had limited access to male physicians. The hospital later moved to a new location and in 1915 was renamed Renji Hospital (仁济医院).

Within eighteen months of her arrival, mission reports indicated sufficient success to justify recruitment of additional medical staff, including personnel to train Chinese women in basic medical procedures and health care. According to Carlotta Hacker, Gifford was the first medical woman to serve with the Canadian Methodist West China Mission.

She continued her medical work during periods of political unrest in the 1890s and early twentieth century, including anti-missionary disturbances.

== West China Union University ==
Gifford was associated with the Faculty of Medicine of West China Union University (W.C.U.U.), an institution established through cooperation among Protestant missions. She taught pediatrics and other medical subjects and contributed to the development of medical education in western China.

After the death of her husband in 1920, she accepted a full-time medical appointment and continued practising in Sichuan for more than a decade. She later served under the Woman’s Missionary Society of the newly formed United Church of Canada.

== Family ==
Retta and Omar Kilborn had several children. Their eldest son, Leslie Gifford Kilborn (1895–1980), became a physician, educator, and medical missionary in China. Other children included Constance Ellen Kilborn (1898–1961), Cora Alfretta Kilborn (born 1899), and Roland Kenneth Kilborn (1901–1959).

== Retirement and death ==
Gifford retired from active service in the early 1930s (sources give either 1932 or 1934). She returned to Canada and died in Toronto on 1 December 1942, aged seventy-eight or seventy-nine.
