= Omar Leslie Kilborn =

Canadian medical missionary

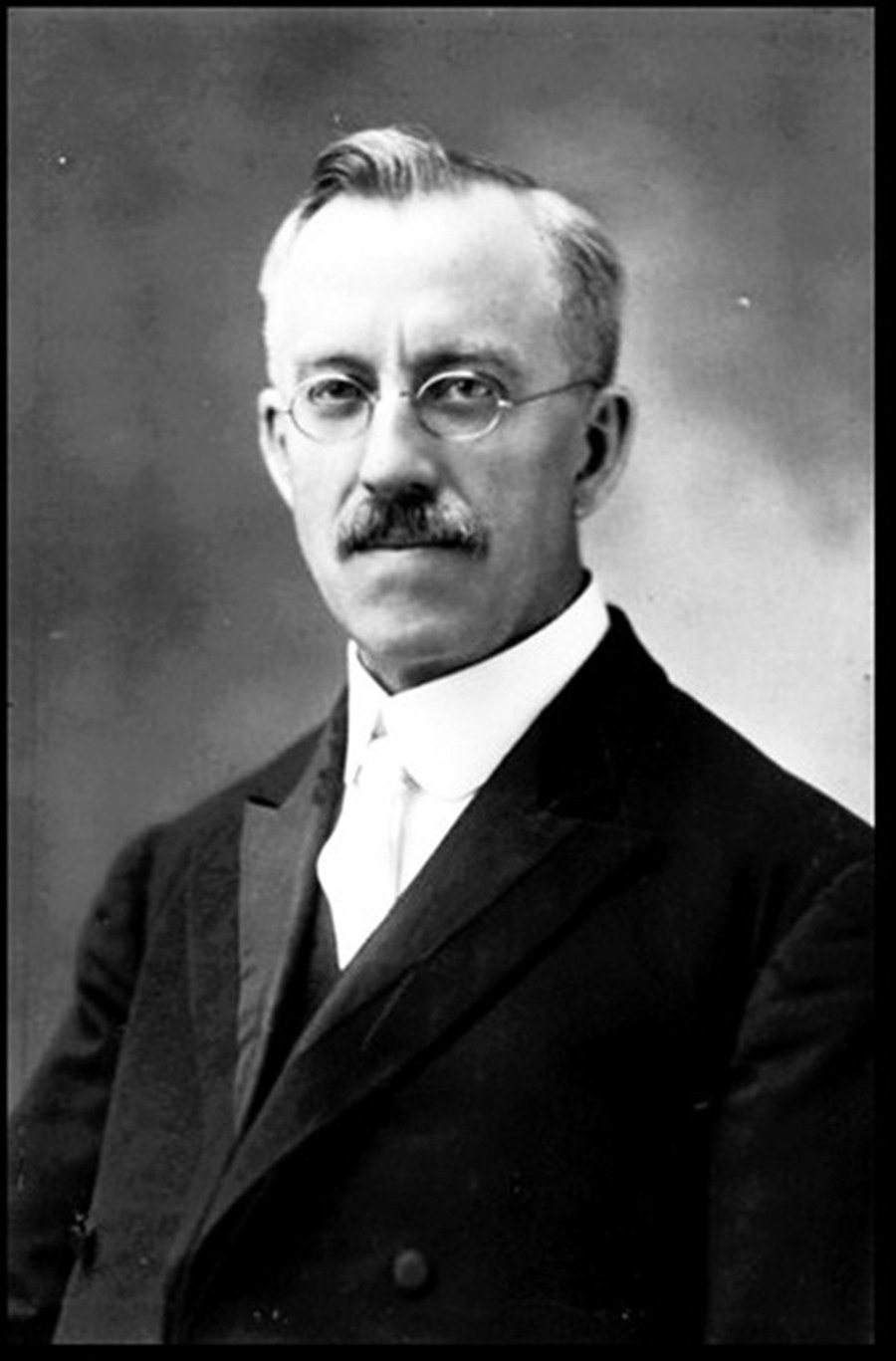
- Born: November 20, 1867; Frankville, Ontario, Canada
- Died: May 18, 1920 (aged 52); Toronto, Ontario, Canada
- Resting place: Mount Pleasant Cemetery, Toronto
- Education: Queen's University at Kingston
- Occupations: Missionary, physician
- Employer: West China Union University
- Spouses: Jane Fowler (m. 1891; died 1892) Retta Gifford Kilborn (née Mary Alfretta Gifford) (m. 1894)
- Children: Leslie Gifford Kilborn

Omar Leslie Kilborn (Chinese name: 啓爾德; 启尔德; November 20, 1867 – May 18, 1920), was a Canadian medical missionary who greatly advanced Western medical techniques in West China. He was one of the founders of the West China Union University in Chengdu, Sichuan, China and was a member of the Canadian Methodist Church. He was an educator, a leading professor of science and medicine, and the author of multiple medical and linguistic texts.

== Early life ==
Kilborn was born in Frankville, Ontario, Canada on November 20, 1867. As the younger of the two sons of a village blacksmith, Kilborn worked many jobs along with his brother, Roland K. Kilborn. These included - operating night railway telegraphy, and handling and shipping cattle from Canada to England. Earning money needed for a higher education, Kilborn attended the Queen’s University in Kingston, receiving his M.A. in chemistry and a gold medal award. He then continued his study of medicine at Queen’s University, graduating with a M.D., C.M. degree. He later went on to postgraduate studies in Edinburgh and Heidelberg. Upon completion of his studies, Kilborn was offered a position to teach at the Queen’s University. Nevertheless, he chose to join the pioneer group of the Canadian Methodist Mission for medical missionary work newly established in Sichuan, China in 1891.

== Marriage and personal life ==
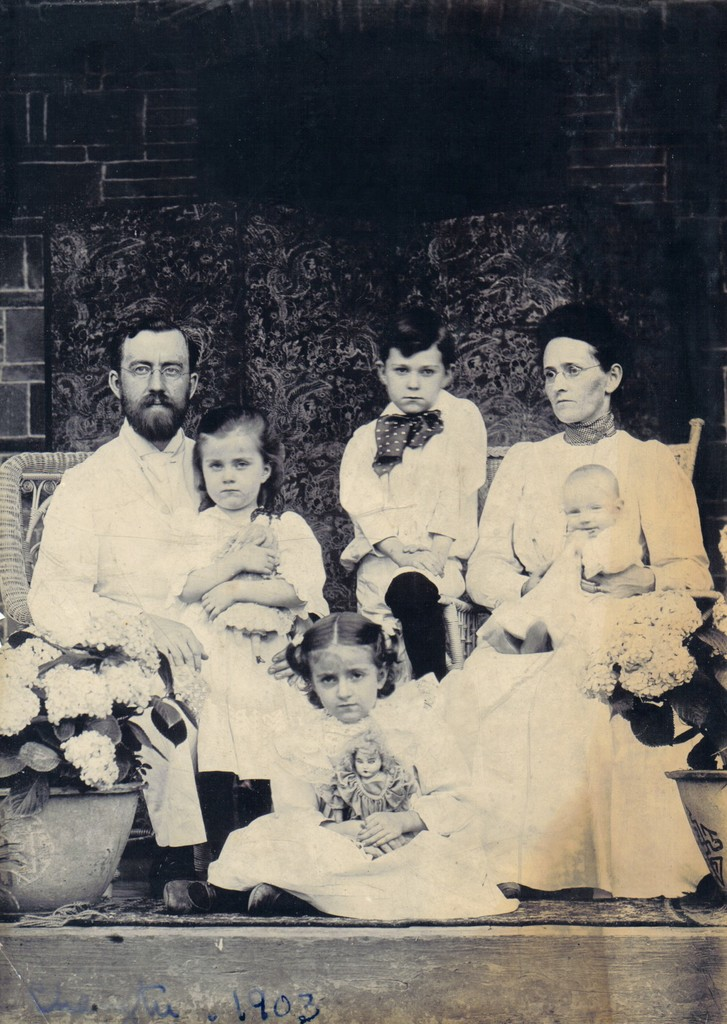
The Kilborn family

Prior to his journey to China, Kilborn married Jennie Fowler, the daughter of a professor of national sciences at the Queen's University. Jennie Fowler traveled to China with Kilborn, first arriving in Shanghai, and then up the Yangtze River to Chengdu. On July 10, 1892, only about two months after their arrival in Chengdu, Fowler died of cholera.

In 1893, Kilborn was sent to Shanghai to greet and escort a new party of missionaries to Chengdu. Upon his arrival in Shanghai, he encountered Dr. Mary Alfretta Gifford, a M.D., C.M. from Trinity College, Toronto, who was going to be the first female doctor with western medical training to work west of the Yangze Gorges in China. On May 24, 1894, Gifford married Kilborn in Chengdu and took the name Retta G. Kilborn (啓希賢; 启希贤; 1864–1942).

On April 7, 1895, Retta gave birth to their son, Leslie Gifford Kilborn (啓真道; 启真道; 1895–1972). In 1898, their second child, a daughter, Constance Ellen Kilborn was born in Chengdu. In 1899, on furlough in Canada, Retta gave birth to their third child and second daughter, Cora Alfretta Kilborn. In December 1901, after returning to Chengdu for missionary work, she gave birth to their fourth child and second son, Roland Kenneth Kilborn.

== Missionary ==
=== Medicine ===
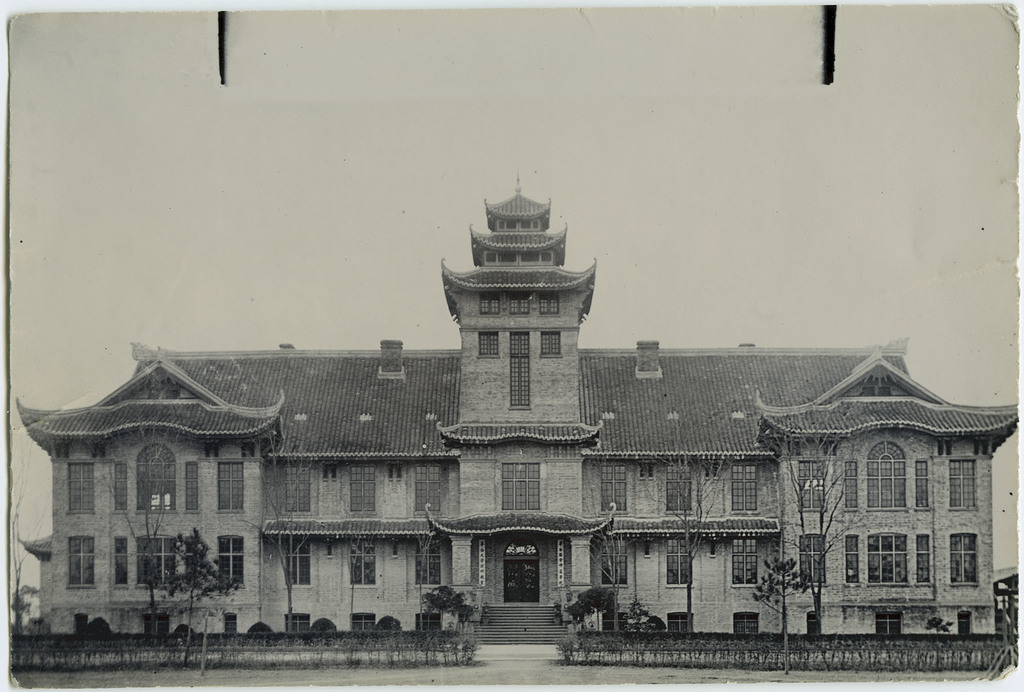
Methodists' Hart Memorial College at West China Union University

Kilborn believed that his duty as a medical missionary was to heal and care for the sick Chinese and fellow missionaries in China as well as "[teach] the science of medicine to young Chinese Christians in Mission Medical Colleges". He hoped to bring western medicine to the Chinese, for the Chinese and by the Chinese.

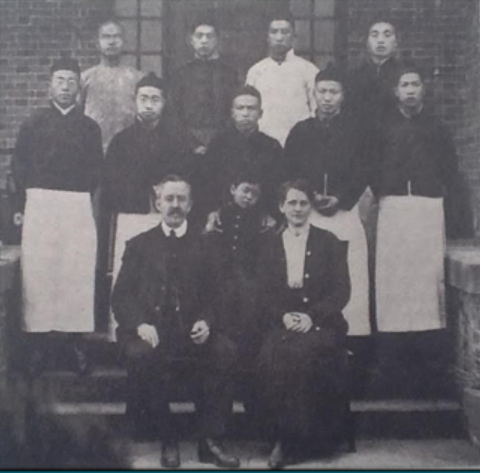
Omar and Retta Kilborn with the first two admitted medical classes of the W.C.U.U.

==== Clinical Service ====
Upon their marriage, Omar and Retta Kilborn were first stationed in Kiating, a city about 100 miles south of Chengdu. Later, the Kilborn couple moved to Chengdu and rented houses on Sishengci Street to open a small clinic called the Gospel Hospital. He served as the director, the doctor, and the nurse due to the lack of professionals in West China. As the first western clinic in the Sichuan region, the Gospel Hospital was originally built to care and treat for fellow missionaries and Christians in West China. Later, this clinic was recognized by the local officials, and the Kilborns received funds to build and open bigger hospitals.

in 1911, Kilborn organized the Chinese Red Cross Society in Sichuan and served the sick and wounded in the revolution. In 1913, the Kilborns also opened the Renji Hospital for Women, the first women's hospital in West China, with a four-floor medical building that had 120 beds for patients.

In addition, Kilborn established and worked at opium refuges in West China to help with the rehabilitation of victims of opium addiction.

==== West China University ====
In 1910, Omar Kilborn, along with others in the pioneer group, founded the West China Union University. Same year, Kilborn made a detailed account of the appeal for medical missions in West China with the publication of his book, Heal the Sick: An Appeal for Medical Missions in China shortly before the 1911 Revolution that overthrew the Manchu Qing Empire. In 1914, Omar Kilborn became the first Chairman of the Senate of the West China Union University and established its Faculty of Medicine. He continued to be a faculty of the W.C.U.U until his death, teaching chemistry, physiology, ophthalmology, pediatrics and therapeutics. During his time in China, the medical center of the W.C.U.U was considered the best hospital in West China.

=== Evangelistic and Educational Work ===
Kilborn was a delegate to the World Missionary Conference in Edinburgh, and a delegate to the Centenary Missionary Conference in Shanghai. Upon his arrival in Chengdu, he carried on his evangelical mission in hopes of spreading the Gospel to the Chinese in West China. He succeeded Mrs. John Parker as editor of The West China Missionary News in January 1907, a position he held until April 1909.

With the regulation put out by the Church, missionaries were expected to learn Mandarin as their priority upon their arrivals in China. To help the newly-arrived missionaries to learn Chinese, Omar Kilborn composed the book Chinese Lessons For First Year Students in West China. Published in 1917 by Union University, Kilborn's book includes frequently used Chinese words and phrases useful in daily conversations and missionary works. This book was used as a first year textbook for Chinese language students until the 1930s.

Kilborn also wrote, Our West China Mission: the Departments of Work and Their Cost, about his medical mission in China.

== Death and legacy ==
Omar Kilborn returned to Canada for vacation in 1919. In April, 1920, he was awarded an honorary degree by Victoria College. He died shortly afterwards, on May 18, 1920, at the age of 53 due to pneumonia. He was buried in Mount Pleasant Cemetery in Toronto, Ontario, Canada. Kilborn gained great esteem and trust from the Chinese community through his service, and when the news of his death was spread to West China, a traditional memorial ceremony was held in the local Confucius temple to commemorate him.

Omar's family continued his missionary work in China. Retta Kilborn returned to West China, serving as a staff of the Faculty of Medicine and of the Canadian Mission Hospital for Women and Children in Chengdu for 12 years. His son, Leslie Gifford Kilborn, served as the director of the College of Medicine of West China Union University as well as contributing to missionary work in the Chung Chi College in Hong Kong. Three generations of the Kilborn family, from 1891 to 1963, served with distinction the cause of medicine and of higher education in West China and Hong Kong.

Today, the West China Union University is known as the West China Medical Center of Sichuan University, and it continues to be one of the top medical institutions in China. The Renji Hospital became today’s Chengdu No.2 People’s Hospital.

In 2018, a documentary series, My Hometown Across the Ocean (相遇百年), was made based on the stories of Canadian missionaires in China from 1892 to 1952. Directed by Gao Song, this series tells the “monumental moments in history and moments which deepened the bond of friendship between the people of Canada and China”. One of the five episodes recounts the journey of Omar Kilborn to China. For the first time after a century, his story and contribution are shown on screen.

== Publications ==
- Kilborn, Omar L. (1910). Heal the Sick: An Appeal for Medical Missions in China. Toronto: The Missionary Society of the Methodist Church.
- Kilborn, Omar L. (1917). Chinese Lessons for First Year Students in West China. Chengtu: The Union University.

== See also ==
- Joseph Beech
- Methodism in Sichuan
- Sï-Shen-Tsï Methodist Church
