= Doug Kilburn =

Canadian ice hockey player

- Born: August 10, 1930 (age 96) Edmonton, Alberta, Canada
- Height: 5 ft 8 in (173 cm)
- Weight: 165 lb (75 kg; 11 st 11 lb)
- Position: Right wing
- Shot: Right
- Played for: Penticton Vees
- National team: Canada
- Playing career: 1947–1972
Medal record
Men's ice hockey
| Gold medal – first place | 1955 West Germany | Ice hockey |

Roy Douglas Kilburn (born August 10, 1930) was a Canadian ice hockey player with the Penticton Vees. He won a gold medal at the 1955 World Ice Hockey Championships in West Germany.
