= Amos Kilbourne =

English footballer

Personal information
- Full name: Amos Kilbourne
- Date of birth: 1880
- Place of birth: Long Eaton, England
- Date of death: 1940 (aged 59–60)
- Height: 5 ft 9 in (1.75 m)
- Position: Inside forward

Senior career*
Years	Team	Apps	(Gls)
1904–1905	Sawley Rangers		
1905–1907	Bury	26	(8)
1907–1910	Grimsby Town	66	(16)
- * Club domestic league appearances and goals

Amos Kilbourne (1881–1940) was an English professional footballer who played as an inside forward.
