= Hood Hill =

Hill in North Yorkshire, England

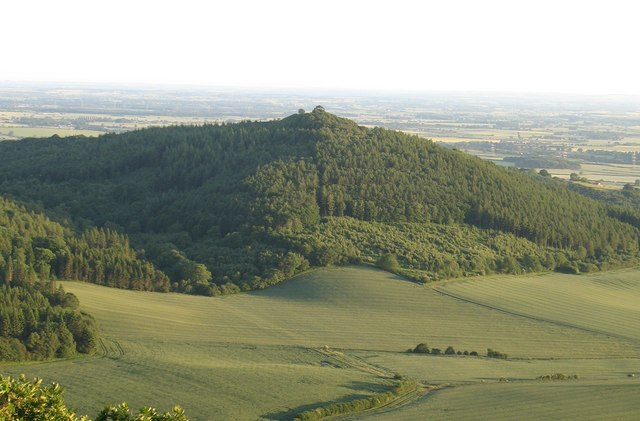
- Hood Hill

Highest point
- Elevation: 252 m (827 ft)
- Coordinates: 54.226°N 1.228°W

Geography
- Location: Kilburn
- Country: England
- County: North Yorkshire
- OS grid: SE503814

Geology
- Rock type(s): Coralline Oolite; Sandstone

Hood Hill is a small peak on the western side of the Hambleton Hills in North Yorkshire. The hill is 252 metres (827 ft) high, and is a layer of Coralline Oolite on top of sandstone. The hill is noted for being conically-shaped, and being part of the view westwards from Sutton Bank.

== Description ==
Hood Hill, which is just to the west of Sutton Bank, and some 7 miles (11 km) east of Thirsk, is 252 metres (827 ft) at its highest point, and the cap slopes gently to the south towards Thirkleby and Carlton Husthwaite. Kilburn Beck rises on its southern flank. The small valley between Roulston Scar and Hood Hill (on the eastern side of the hill), was carved by ice and meltwater streams during the Ice-Age. It is thought that both Hood Beck and Hood Grange (known as Hode in the 12th century), are named after the adjacent Hood Hill. The name derives from the Old English hōd – a hood-shaped hill.

The conical-shaped cap of Hood Hill is a layer of Coralline Oolite; an oolitic limestone which also makes up the cliffs of Boltby Scar, Roulston Scar and Whitestonecliff. The oolite can be up to 18 metres (60 ft) thick in places, and the harder sandstone underneath the cap was quarried for use locally in building and for walling stone. It is thought that the top of the hill would have protruded above the ice sheet as a Nunatak. Hood Hill is part of the west-facing escarpment of the Hambleton Hills that overlooks the Vale of York. The area was afforested by the Forestry Commission in the 1950s.

It has been suggested that a stone on the top of the hill is one formerly used by druids, with some writers suggesting human sacrifice. There is evidence of dykes, trenches and other earthworks from the Romano-British period. Hood Castle, a motte and bailey structure, was believed to have been built by Roger de Stuteville in the 12th century; a document records that Henry II sent 300 soldiers to Hood Castle to help rout bandits in the area around Hood Hill. A licence to crenellate was awarded in 1264, but it was last mentioned in 1322. The site is now a scheduled monument.

Veterinary surgeon and author, James Herriott described the view from Sutton Bank across Gormire Lake and Hood Hill as the "finest in England".

== Aircraft crashes ==
There have been two aircraft crashes on the hill:

- 5 May 1943 – Halifax JD105 was returning from a bombing raid over Dortmund in the Second World War, crashing into the hill during thick fog, killing five of the eight crew. After the initial bombing run over Germany, one of the crew members stated that he felt ill, and so the pilot reduced the height possibly due to suspected hypoxia in the crew member. Engine trouble was also thought to be an issue.
- 21 September 1954 – A Sabre (XD733) of No. 92 Squadron based at RAF Linton-on-Ouse crashed almost vertically into the hill.

A memorial to both crashes has been placed on the hill. In 2009, a report in the York Press stated that military souvenir hunters were using metal detectors to salvage equipment from the Sabre crash site. People were warned that the pilots remains are still on the hill, and that the site was protected by the Protection of Military Remains Act.
