= Kilburn station =

Kilburn station may refer to:

- Kilburn tube station, a London Underground station on the Jubilee line
- Kilburn Park tube station, a London Underground station on the Bakerloo line
- Kilburn High Road railway station, a London Overground station on the Watford DC line
- Kilburn railway station, Adelaide, a station on the Gawler railway line in Adelaide, Australia
- Kilburn railway station, a former Midland Railway station in Derbyshire, England
