= Dexter Drumlin =

Hill in Lancaster, Massachusetts, US

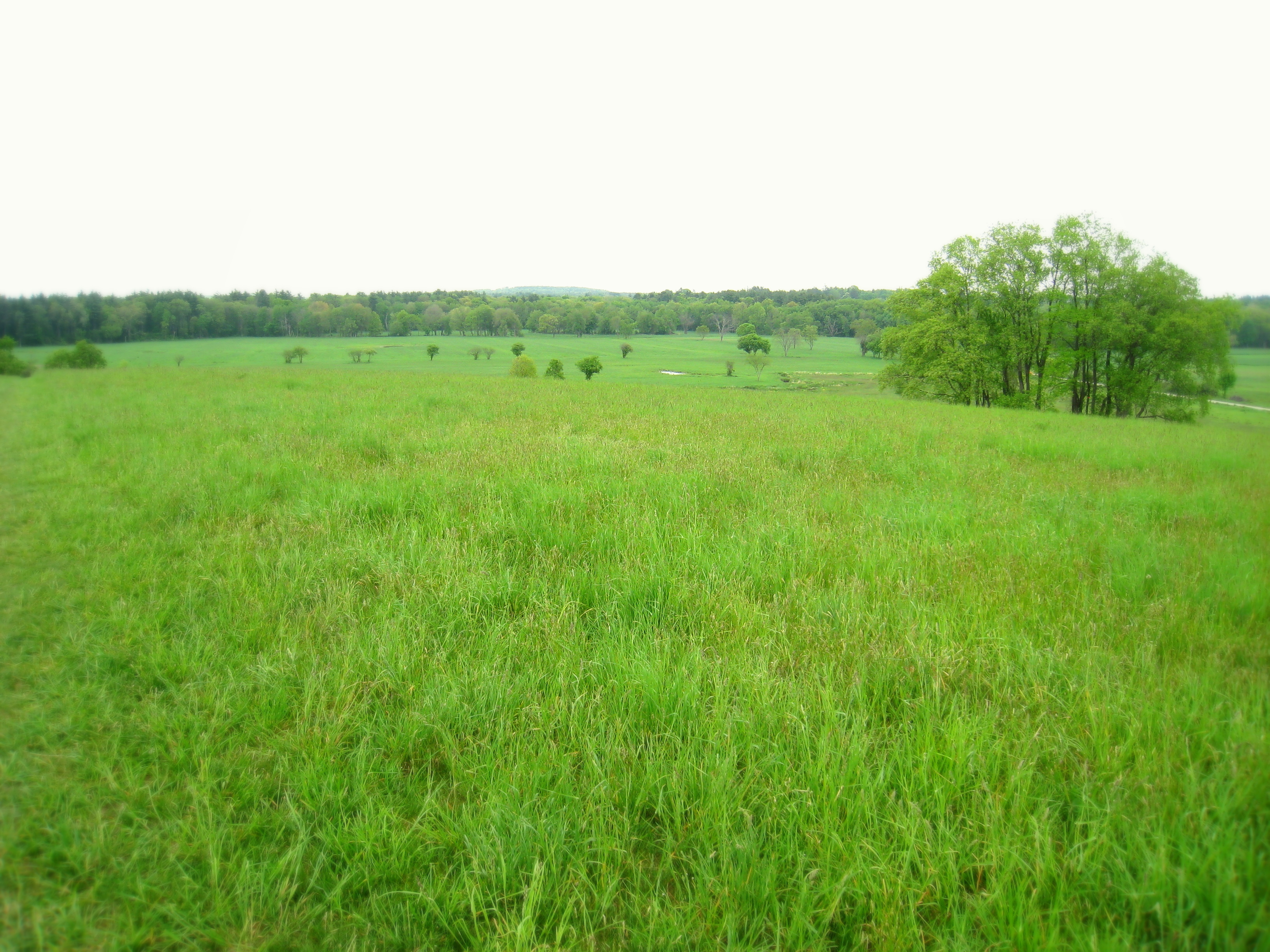
- Summit view from Dexter Drumlin
- Interactive map of Dexter Drumlin
- Established: 2000
- Operator: The Trustees of Reservations
- Website: Dexter Drumlin

Dexter Drumlin

Highest point
- Elevation: 311 ft (95 m)
- Coordinates: 42°26′56″N 71°41′14″W

Geology
- Rock age(s): glacial till landform; 10,000-15,000 years
- Mountain type: drumlin

Dexter Drumlin, formerly known as Kilbourn Hill, is a 311-foot (95 m) drumlin and a 38-acre (15 ha) open space reservation in Lancaster, Massachusetts. The reservation includes a small tributary of the Nashua River and is managed by The Trustees of Reservations. It is characterized by managed, open fields and offers scenic views of surrounding rural Lancaster.

== History ==
As glaciers retreated from what is now the New England landscape, distinctive hills were formed. When the last glacier moved across the New England landscape over 10,000 years ago, it formed distinctively shaped hills called "drumlins" running parallel to the path of the ancient ice flow. Dexter Drumlin is "a classic example"

35 acres (140,000 m^{2}) surrounding the drumlin was donated to the Trustees of Reservations by Lancaster "town father" Nathaniel Dexter by bequest in 2002. The change of the toponym from "Kilbourn Hill" to "Dexter Drumlin" was part of a Trustees of Reservations rebranding effort in 2000 following their acquisition of the property.

== Ecology ==
The reservation consists of hayfield, transitional meadow, and wetlands. The stream that runs along the western side of the hill forms wet meadows in lower terrain. Grassland bird species nest and raise their young on the hill and in the adjacent floodplains.

Researchers at Fitchburg State College have used the reservation as a place to study the mating displays of male fireflies. Using specially designed devices to mimic the fireflies bioluminescence, the researchers found that the courtship flashes of Photinus ignitus males attracts both competitors and predators.

== Recreation ==
Dexter Drumlin is open to hiking, picnicking, crosscountry skiing, mountain biking, sledding, and kite flying. A one-mile (1.6 km) long mowed, path passes over the crest of the drumlin and along the Nashua River tributary. The property has been used for kite flying events. Rock collectors may discover "sacred crosses" of chiastolite of a type considered to be of spiritual value by the Algonquian peoples who once dominated the region.

The reservation trailhead is located on George Hill Road across from Browning Elementary School in Lancaster.
