= Kilburn Wilmot =

English cricketer

Personal information
- Born: 3 April 1911; Chilvers Coton, Warwickshire, England
- Died: 25 April 1996 (aged 85); Nuneaton, Warwickshire, England
- Batting: Right-handed
- Bowling: Right-arm fast
- Role: Bowler

Domestic team information
- Years: Team
- 1931–39: Warwickshire
- First-class debut: 23 May 1931 Warwickshire v Derbyshire
- Last First-class: 31 August 1939 Warwickshire v Middlesex

Career statistics
Competition	FC
Matches	75
Runs scored	871
Batting average	11.46
100s/50s	–/2
Top score	54
Balls bowled	10687
Wickets	154
Bowling average	32.58
5 wickets in innings	2
10 wickets in match	1
Best bowling	7/34
Catches/stumpings	23/–
- Source: CricketArchive, 28 December 2015

Kilburn Wilmot (3 April 1911 – 24 April 1996) was an English cricketer who played first-class cricket between 1931 and 1939 for Warwickshire. He also played football for Coventry City and Walsall. He was born in Chilvers Coton, Warwickshire, and died in Nuneaton, also in Warwickshire.

Wilmot was a right-handed lower-order batsman and a right-arm fast swing bowler. He played in occasional first eleven matches for Warwickshire from 1931, but made little impact until 1935 when he improved his personal best bowling figures twice in the game against Leicestershire, taking five wickets for 91 runs in the second innings. In 1936, he played in more than half of Warwickshire's matches, and in the game against Surrey he achieved the best bowling figures of his career, with seven wickets for 34 runs in the first innings and four for 56 in the second, giving match figures of 11 for 90.

Wilmot's career did not, however, take off after this success: in 1937, he played in only a few matches and although he was a fairly regular member of the side in both 1938 and 1939, he did not take five wickets in an innings again and his seasonal total of wickets never exceeded the 38 he achieved in both 1936 and 1938. For most of his career, his batting was negligible, and only the presence in the Warwickshire side of Eric Hollies kept him from occupying the No 11 batting position. In 1939, however, he made a great improvement and averaged 26 with the bat for the season; his two scores of more than 50 both came in this season and with the higher of them, a score of 54, he shared an eighth-wicket partnership with Tom Dollery which remains a Warwickshire record in first-class games against Derbyshire. Wilmot's cricket career ended with the outbreak of the Second World War.
