= Ruth Kilbourn =

American dancer and dance teacher

Ruth Kilbourn (1895–1984) was a Chicago-area dancer and dance teacher. She was educated by prominent dance instructors in Chicago and appeared on Broadway and in the Chicago Opera House. A back injury forced her to end her performance career at a young age, but she cultivated a large following through her dance studio, the Kilbourn School of Dance. She tutored young dancers both in her home and in public schools throughout the city. Kilbourn's extensive work in the Chicago community also extended to animals, as she willed her home to the Chicago Anti-Cruelty Society upon her death.
