= Leslie Gifford Kilborn =

- Born: April 7, 1895; Kiating, Sichuan, Qing China
- Died: June 23, 1967 (aged 72); Toronto, Ontario, Canada
- Education: Victoria College; University of Toronto
- Occupations: Missionary, physiologist
- Employer: West China Union University
- Spouses: Janet R. McClure (m. 1921; died 1945) Jean E. Millar (m. 1947)
- Parents: Omar Leslie Kilborn (father); Retta Gifford Kilborn (née Mary Alfretta Gifford) (mother)

Leslie Gifford Kilborn (April 7, 1895 – June 23, 1967), the son of Omar L. Kilborn and Retta Kilborn, was born in Sichuan, western China. Kilborn greatly advanced missionary work in west China. He was the author of multiple texts, translator of many textbooks, and served as director of the College of Medicine of West China Union University and dean of the Faculty of the College of Medicine.

== Background ==
Kilborn married Dr. Janet R. McClure, the daughter of missionaries in the Canadian Presbyterian Mission in north China. Therefore, she was well acquainted with Mandarin Chinese, and both began working immediately for missionaries in Sichuan. They had three children.

Janet died in 1945, and Kilborn married Jean Ewart Millar, an anesthetic specialist. They lived under the Communist regime in China, and helped refugees who sought shelter and accommodation. Millar was born in Guelph, Ontario, in 1906. She served as a missionary for the Woman's Missionary Society in Chinese hospitals between 1932 and 1946, and taught at the University of Hong Kong, where Leslie also worked after 1952. She returned with her husband to Canada in 1963, and died in 1982; he died in 1967.

== Education ==
Kilborn was born in China, and moved back to Canada to pursue an education. Kilborn enrolled at the University of Toronto in 1913, and took honors classes in physiology and biochemistry. Graduating with first-class honors in 1917, he obtained his M.A. in physiology and obtained his M.D. in 1921. He also received the Victoria Silver Medal in Science.

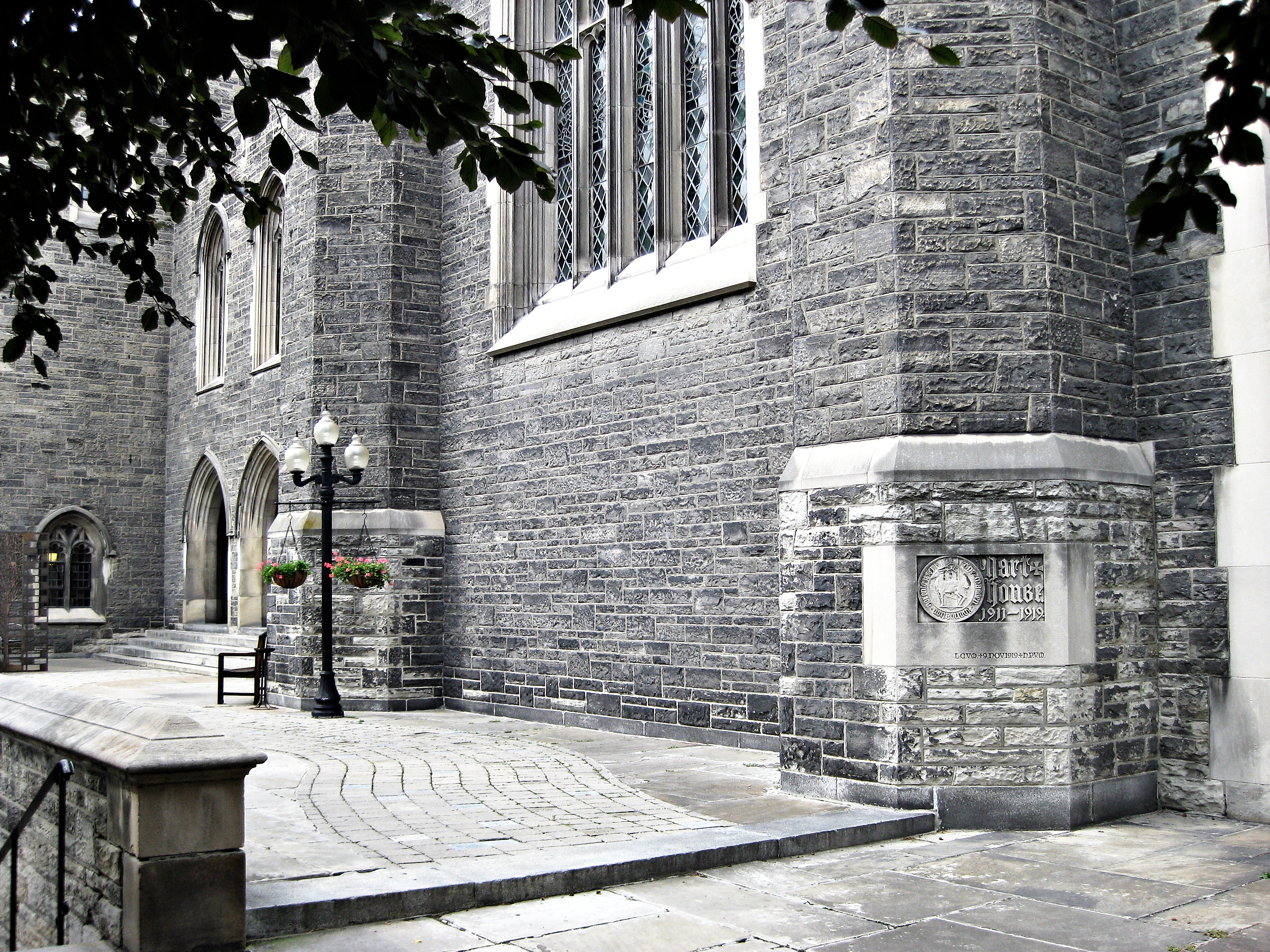
University of Toronto, where Leslie Gifford Kilborn graduated with first-class honors in 1917.

He co-wrote the book Observations on the Glycogen Content of Certain Invertebrates and Fishes with John James Rickard Macleod. He also wrote a number of other books about the effects of adrenaline in vascular changes, notably in animals or vertebrates. To advance his academic career further, Kilborn moved from Sichuan to Chengdu. He worked at the West China Union University as a physiology professor. At the university, he collaborated with other faculty to translate many medical textbooks into Chinese. In collaboration with another author, he translated Halliburton’s Physiology. In the late 1920s, Kilborn earned his Ph.D. degree in physiology in Canada before continuing his career at the university. Kilborn eventually became the director of the College of Medicine and Dentistry, which his father Omar had pioneered, until 1950. He also earned the deanship of the Faculty of Medicine.

== Journey ==
Kilborn and his wife Janet set out for west China in the autumn of 1921. After arriving at Chengdu, he started medical work in Pengxian county and took Mandarin lessons simultaneously. About a year and a half later, he moved from Pengxian county back to Chengdu where he began his teaching career as a physiology lecturer. Quickly rising through the ranks of the academic world, Leslie became the dean of the Department of Physiology and deputy section head of the medical division. In 1925, Kilborn was seriously injured by a dum-dum bullet. He needed four months to recover partially and his wounds left him with a permanently disabled shoulder. His new disability hindered his penchant for missionary work, making it difficult for him to move around and carry out daily activities.

In 1936 he became dean of the College of Medicine and three years later, he was elected the director of the College of Dentistry in 1939. He held the position for eight years. Not only ensuring their accommodation, but also ensuring the continuation of their education, Kilborn allowed the displaced students to use the amenities of his university. His dedication to house refugees manifested ostensibly when he welcomed them to the comforts of his own home.

== Service ==
In 1952, he left China and became the professor of physiology at the University of Hong Kong. As an academic force, Kilborn pursued research with a fervor. He was deeply involved with research on the tribal people of the west China borderland, and often made trips to the countryside. He continued to remain in Hong Kong as vice-president of Chung Chi College, an institution that contributed to missionary work.

The center where Kilborn conducted research promoted the rapid development of regional health care. His mastery of Mandarin allowed him to interact easily with the Chinese native to the region, eradicating suspicion or mistrust because he spoke their native tongue. Morse called him "a specialist with the highest professional training we have never seen before. He was able to lead the development of physiology. He was born in China, no other foreign teachers could speak decent Chinese like him." "His laboratory was the best of its kind in W.C.U.U."

Kilborn's service was not limited to the academic world. He was deeply involved in politics and strengthening international relations. When Canada and China first established diplomatic relations, the Canadian government asked Kilborn to assist the newly appointed minister in establishing a legation in Chongqing. He travelled between Canada and Chengdu despite the arduous travel involved.

== Death ==
Leslie G. Kilborn died on June 23, 1967, in the Toronto Western Hospital. At the time of his death, he was engaged in writing the history of the West China Union University.

== See also ==
- Canadian Methodist Mission
- Methodism in Sichuan
- Sï-Shen-Tsï Methodist Church
- The West China Missionary News
- Journal of the West China Border Research Society
