= Cecil Kilborn =

English footballer

Personal information
- Date of birth: 18 March 1902
- Place of birth: Desborough, England
- Date of death: 7 June 1983 (aged 81)
- Place of death: Desborough, England
- Height: 5 ft 7 1/2 in (1.71 m)
- Position: Inside left

Youth career
- Desborough Town

Senior career*
| Years | Team | Apps | (Gls) |
| 1919–1924 | Bradford City | 40 | (5) |
- * Club domestic league appearances and goals

Cecil Kilborn (18 March 1902 – 7 June 1983) was an English footballer who played inside left for Bradford City.

Kilborn was born in Desborough and played for Desborough Town until December 1919 when he was signed for Division One side Bradford City. But it was not until 8 October 1921 Kilborn made his debut in a 2–0 defeat against Middlesbrough, playing a total of 14 games that season as the club lost its top flight status. In 1922–23 Kilborn was the club's joint top goal-scorer with just five goals. He was released in 1924 after just 40 games with the club.
