= Kilburn, North Yorkshire =

Village in North Yorkshire, England

Coordinates: 54°12′33″N 1°12′50″W

Kilburn
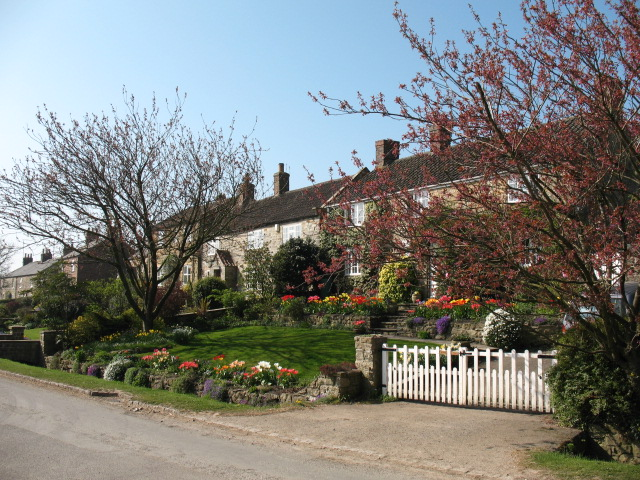
- Cottages in Kilburn

- Location within North Yorkshire
- Population: 227 (2011 census)
- OS grid reference: SE512797
  - London: 190 mi (310 km) SSE
- Civil parish: Kilburn High and Low
- Unitary authority: North Yorkshire
- Ceremonial county: North Yorkshire
- Region: Yorkshire and the Humber
- Country: England
- Sovereign state: United Kingdom
- Post town: YORK
- Postcode district: YO61
- Dialling code: 01347
- Police: North Yorkshire
- Fire: North Yorkshire
- Ambulance: Yorkshire
- UK Parliament: Thirsk and Malton

Kilburn is a village in the civil parish of Kilburn High and Low, in the county of North Yorkshire, England. It lies on the edge of the North York Moors National Park, 6.2 miles (10 km) north of Easingwold.

== History ==
The village is mentioned in the Domesday Book of 1086 as "Chileburne" in the Yalestre hundred. At the time of the Norman invasion, the lord of the manor was Arnketil, but was subsequently granted to Hugh, son of Baldric. During the reign of Henry I the manor was passed to Rouen Cathedral in Normandy and subsequently to Roger de Mowbray who passed the lands to the Colvilles. In return for receiving these lands, Thomas de Colville had to swear allegiance to Roger de Mowbray. The Colvilles held the manor until 1405 when the eighth Thomas Colville was murdered outside York and died without male heirs. The lands were held by the Archbishop of York after the Dissolution of the Monasteries in the 16th century.

Kilburn was historically a township and parish in the wapentake of Birdforth in the North Riding of Yorkshire. After 1837 it was part of the Thirsk and Helmsley Poor Law Unions. The parish, which covered 5,900 acres (24 km^{2}) acres, comprised Kilburn, Oldstead, Thorpe-le-Willows, and Wass, of which Kilburn had the largest population. The etymology of the name comes from two Old English words, ciele and burna, meaning "cool stream".

Robert de Alneto, a monk from Whitby Abbey, lived in a hermitage at Hood Grange, 2 miles (3 km) from the village. In 1138 Robert de Mowbray converted it into a Cistercian abbey, which later moved to Old Byland and subsequently moved again to Byland.

== Governance ==
The village lies within the Thirsk and Malton UK Parliament constituency. From 1974 to 2023 it was part of the Hambleton District. It is now administered by the unitary North Yorkshire Council.

== Geography ==
The village consists of High Kilburn, situated on a hillside, and Low Kilburn in the valley on the banks of a stream. It lies about 7 miles (11 km) east from Thirsk. The nearest settlements are Wass 2.6 miles (4.2 km) to the east; Coxwold 2 miles (3 km) to the south-east; Carlton Husthwaite 1.9 miles (3 km) to the south-west and Thirkleby 2.3 miles (3.7 km) to the west. There was a sandstone quarry at Hood Hill.

The 1881 UK Census recorded the population as 387. The 2001 UK Census recorded the population as 180, of which 162 were over sixteen years old and 84 of those were in employment. There were 105 dwellings of which 73 were detached. There are a total of 18 Grade II listed buildings in the area.

The village is known for the White Horse. The White Horse is a figure cut into the hillside to the north of the village, and visible for many miles around on a clear day.

== Religion ==
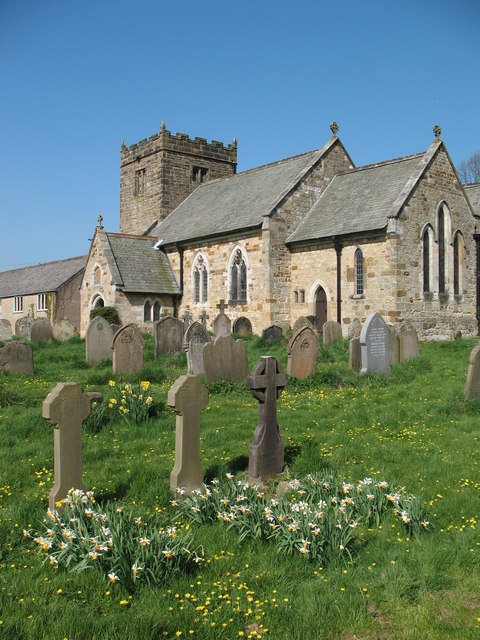
St Mary's Church, Kilburn

St Mary's Church, Kilburn is a Grade II* listed building which was erected in the early 12th century and underwent restoration in 1869.

A Wesleyan chapel was built in the village in 1838.

== Notable people ==
- Robert Thompson, whose trade-name was "the Mouseman", lived in the village. He manufactured furniture in English oak mainly for church use. His work is distinguished by a carving of a mouse somewhere on the piece. Examples can be seen on the wooden candlesticks in Westminster Abbey. These pieces were commissioned directly by the widow of the captain of HMS Barham as a memorial to the lost ship and her crew. The Mouseman Visitor Centre lies in the village.
- John Harte (mayor)

== See also ==
- Listed buildings in Kilburn High and Low
