= Kilbourne (DJ) =

Ashe Kilbourne, who performs under the name Kilbourne, is an electronic dance music DJ and producer based in New York. She plays hard techno and gabber, and also plays in grindcore bands. She started making music when she was a student at Wesleyan University in Connecticut and then joined the DJ collective kunq. In 2017, she played Bloodrave: Music From Blade, a re-imagined score for the film Blade, in screenings in Brooklyn, Seattle and Baltimore. The score was released as her third EP. After releasing eight more EPs, in 2025 she released her debut album, If Not to Give a Fantasy, on Hammerhead Records.
