= Robert Thompson (designer) =

British furniture designer (1876–1955)

- Robert 'Mouseman' Thompson in his workshop
- Born: 7 May 1876; Kilburn, North Yorkshire
- Died: 8 December 1955 (aged 79)
- Other names: Mouseman; Mousey Thompson
- Occupation: furniture maker

Robert "Mouseman" Thompson (7 May 1876 – 8 December 1955), also known as 'Mousey' Thompson, was a British furniture maker. He was born and lived in Kilburn, Yorkshire, England, where he set up a business manufacturing oak furniture, which featured a carved mouse on almost every piece.

== Mouseman furniture ==
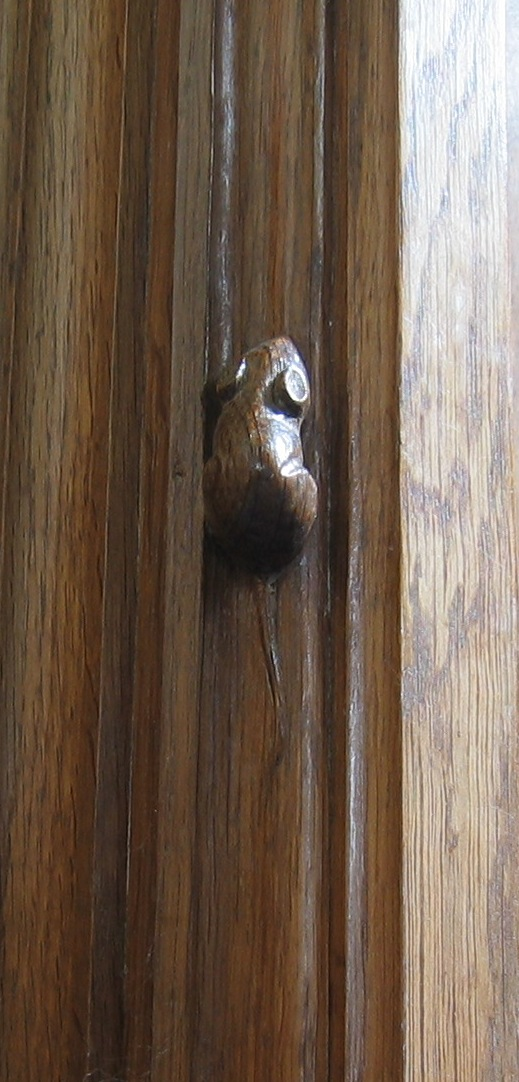
Thompson's trademark carving on the altar rail in Kilburn Parish Church, North Yorkshire

It is claimed that the mouse motif came about accidentally in 1919 following a conversation about "being as poor as a church mouse", which took place between Thompson and one of his colleagues during the carving of a cornice for a screen. This chance remark led to him carving a mouse and this remained part of his work from this point onwards.

Thompson was part of the 1920s revival of craftsmanship, inspired by the Arts and Crafts movement led by William Morris, John Ruskin and Thomas Carlyle. More specific to furniture making in this genre and era include Stanley Webb Davies of Windermere.

The workshop, now being run by his descendants, includes a showroom and the Mouseman Visitor Centre, and is located beside the Parish Church, which contains "Mouseman" pews, fittings and other furniture. The company is now known as "Robert Thompson's Craftsmen Ltd – The Mouseman of Kilburn."

Fr Paul Nevill, a former Headmaster of Ampleforth College, asked Thompson to make Ampleforth Abbey's furniture; the school liked it so much that Ampleforth kept asking Thompson for more work, including the library and most of the main building. Most of Ampleforth College's houses are now decorated with Robert Thompson's furniture. Another collection of Thompson's work is located at the Church of St Michael and All Angels, Hubberholme in North Yorkshire where, during the 1930s, he designed most of the church's interior furnishings, including pews, choir stalls and chairs.

Others, including former apprentices who continued in his style working in Yorkshire oak, adopted similar identifying marks and nicknames. These makers include Thomas "Gnomeman" Whittaker (1910–1991), Atkinson (1910-?)(apprentice to Robert Thompson), Derek "Lizardman" Slater, Colin "Beaverman" Almack, Robert "Rabbitman" Heap, Graham "Swanman" Duncalf, Alan "Acornman" Grainger, Wilf "Squirrelman" Hutchinson, Albert "Eagleman" Jeffray, Malcolm "Foxman" Pipes, and Shaw & Riley "The Seahorsemen of Hessay".

== Gallery ==
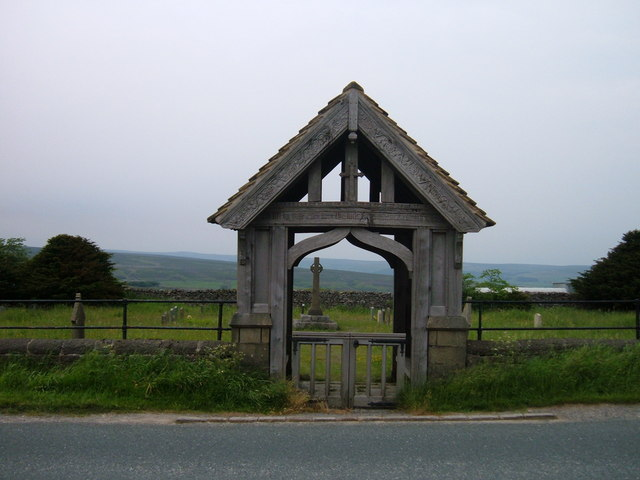
Mouseman lychgate at Greenhow, North Yorkshire

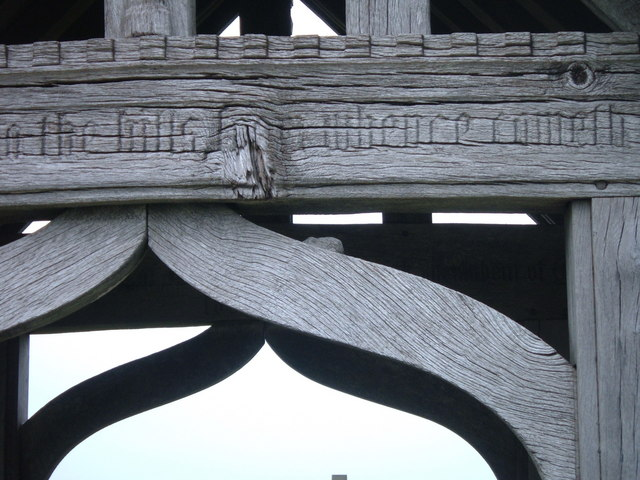
Mouse on the Greenhow lychgate

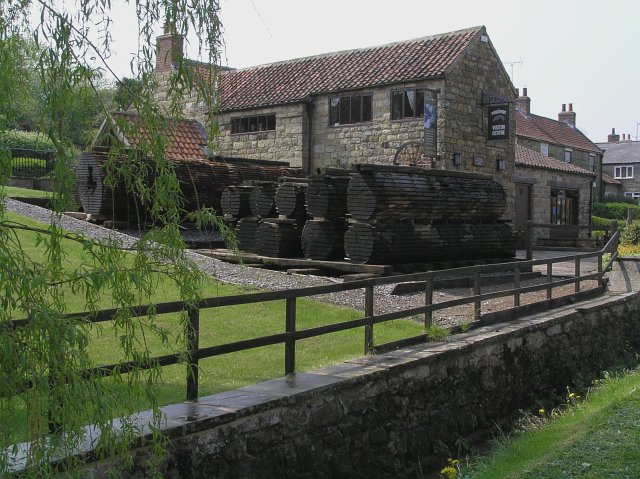
Mouseman Visitor Centre in Kilburn, North Yorkshire

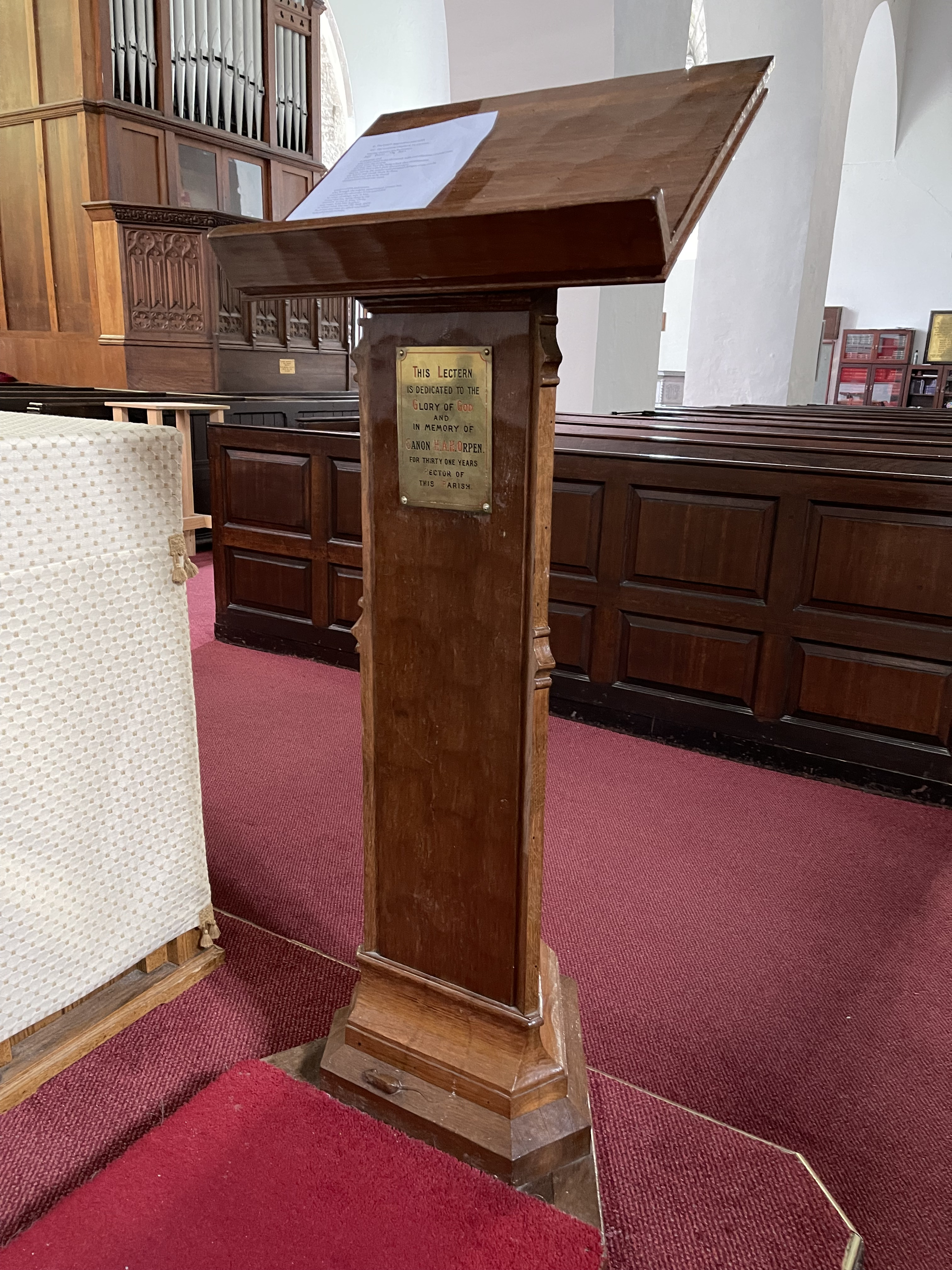
Lectern - St Nicholas' Church, Adare

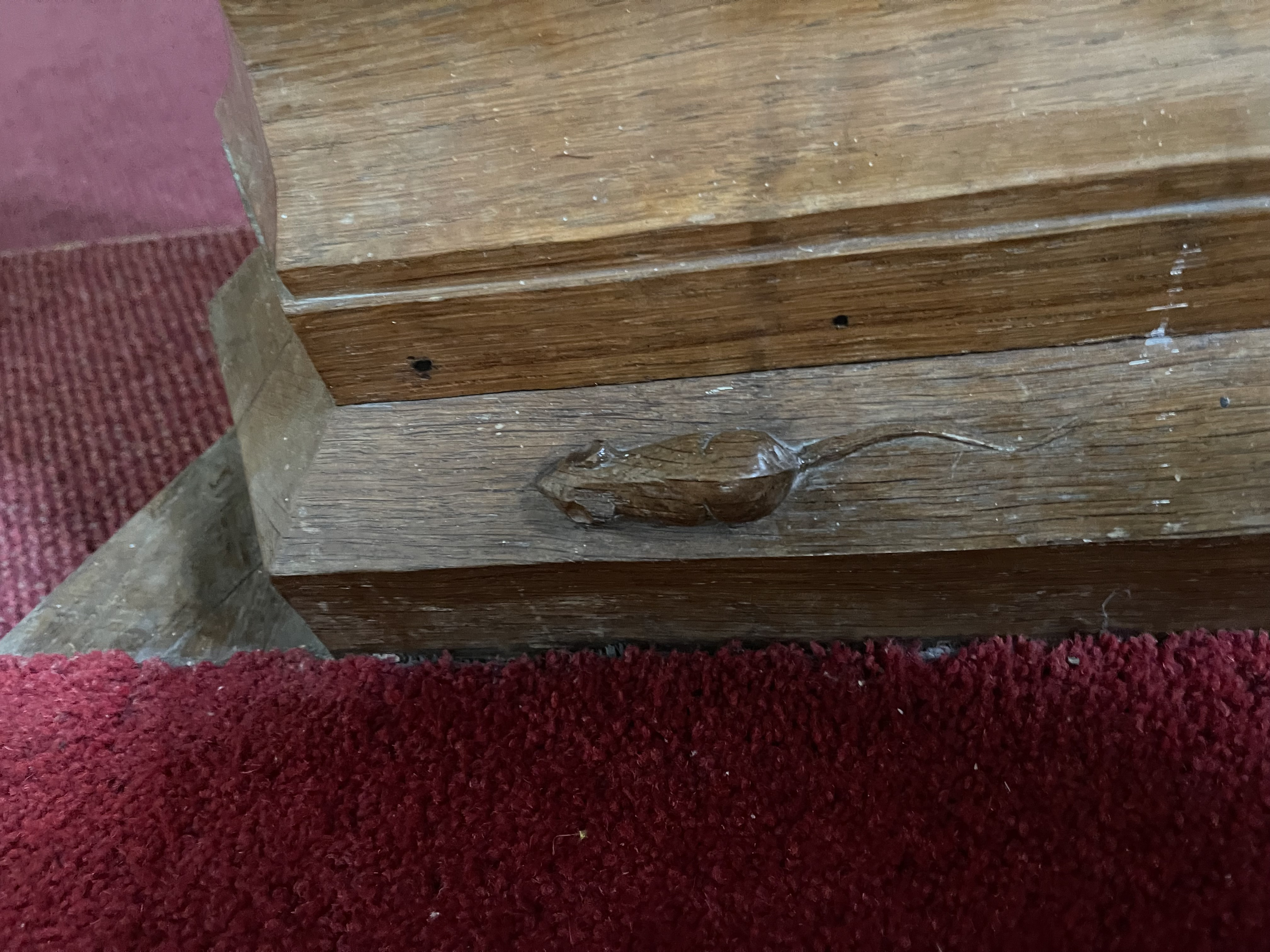
Lectern - St Nicholas' Church, Adare

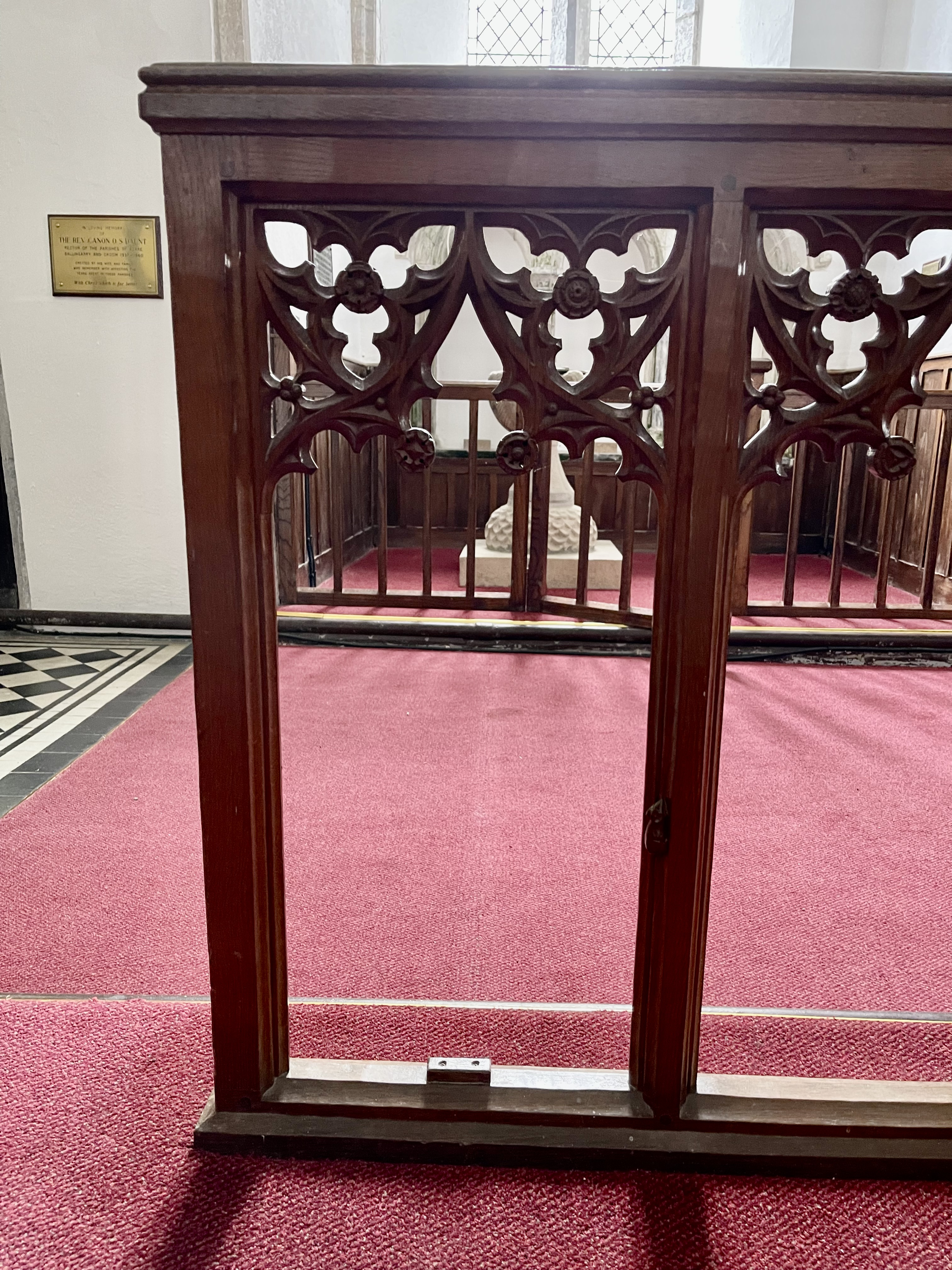
Railing - St Nicholas' Church, Adare

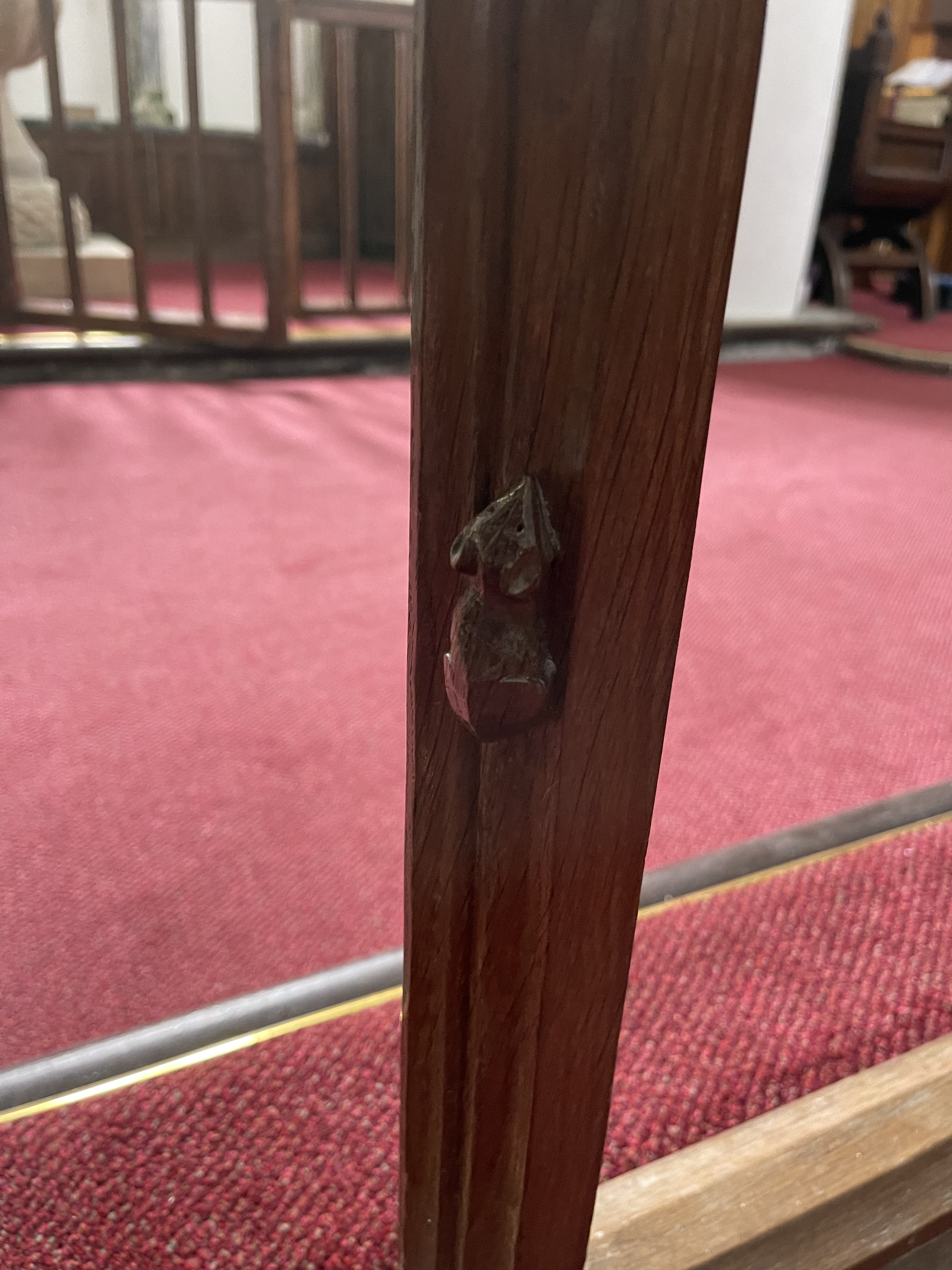
Railing - St Nicholas' Church, Adare

== Where to see "Mouseman" furniture ==
- Mouseman Visitor Centre: Showroom, Viewing Gallery and Office
- Church of St Michael and All Angels, Hubberholme
- All Saints Church, Allesley
- St Mary's RC Church, Leyland, Lancashire
- Bangor Cathedral
- St Mary's Church, Beverley
- Parish Church of St John and St Martin, Beverley
- Craven Museum & Gallery
- The Museum of North Craven Life; The Folly, Settle, North Yorkshire
- St Nicholas' Church, Stevenage, pews (1964)
- The Peacock at Rowsley, Derbyshire
- Immaculate Conception, Sicklinghall LS22 4BD, pews (1960's)
- Ampleforth Abbey
- St Nicholas' Church, Adare, Co Limerick, Ireland
- St Margaret's Church, Ridge, Hertfordshire
- Pluscarden Abbey, Moray, Scotland
- All Saints' Church, Helmsley, North Yorkshire
- Worksop College, Worksop, Nottinghamshire
- All Saints’ Church, Bolton Percy, North Yorkshire
- St Peter’s Church, Harrogate, North Yorkshire
- Church of St Matthias, Malvern Link, Worcestershire; Lady Chapel screen walls.
- The Star at Harome, North Yorkshire
- St Mary's Church, Burley in Wharfedale
- St Helen's Church, Sefton
