= Grape Island (Essex County, Massachusetts) =

Island in Essex County, Massachusetts, United States

Coordinates: 42°43′10″N 70°47′43″W

Grape Island, sometimes known as Grape Island, Ipswich, is a part of Plum Island, in Ipswich, Massachusetts, in the United States. For nearly two centuries, Grape Island was a small, but thriving community of fishermen, farmers, and clam diggers, until the land was purchased by the US Government and turned into a wildlife refuge in the middle of the 20th century. Its last resident was Lewis Kilborn, who lived his entire life on the island until his death in 1984.

== Geography ==
Though often considered a part of Plum Island, Grape Island is separated from the larger barrier island by a creek. It can be seen from Ipswich's "Great Neck" which provides an excellent view across Plum Island Sound. It can still be accessed by boat, or perhaps less easily by land at low tide from the marshes of Plum Island State Park.

== History ==
Local histories record that fishermen and farmers settled on Grape Island throughout the 18th Century, and like Plum Island, Grape Island had a somewhat sizeable population by the 1870s. By the late 1800s there was a hotel, operated by the MacKinney Family, a school where Grape Island's children attended class from April to November, and a number of small cottages and houses owned by seasonal and year-round residents. Some of the more prominent families on the island were the Smalls, Baileys, MacKinney's and Kilborns. Summer on the island saw additional seasonal residents and the island and its surroundings were popular with duck hunters, fishermen, lobstermen, and clammers.

The island witnessed considerable decline beginning in the 1920s as more and more families left for the towns of Ipswich, Rowley, Newbury, and Newburyport and elsewhere. By the 1930s, only the Kilborn Family and one other family remained and soon thereafter the Department of the Interior took possession of the island and it became part of the Parker River National Wildlife Refuge. John Kilborn and his son Lewis Kilborn refused to leave however and paid the Government monthly rent of $10.00 a month to stay on the island. John Kilborn died in 1946, and for the next 38 years the only residents on Grape Island were Lewis Kilborn and the area's wildlife.

Well known in the area, and sometimes referred to as the "Hermit of Grape Island" (a reference he hated), Lewis Kilborn continued to live on the island much like earlier generations had, collecting rain for his water supply, heating his house with a wood stove, fishing, and heading into town in his boat for groceries. He listened to the world's events through a transistor radio and would read any and all books and newspapers that friends and relatives would bring him. He died in March 1984.

== Modern times ==
Little remains of the houses, cottages, school and the hotel on Grape Island. What wasn't torn down, or removed by the Government was long ago reclaimed by nature. Numerous magazine and newspaper articles about Grape Island have appeared in Yankee Magazine, and the local papers, some of them written by former Representative John F. Dolan of Ipswich (Lewis Kilborn's nephew) who lived there as a boy in the 1920s.
