= List of Protestant missionaries in China =

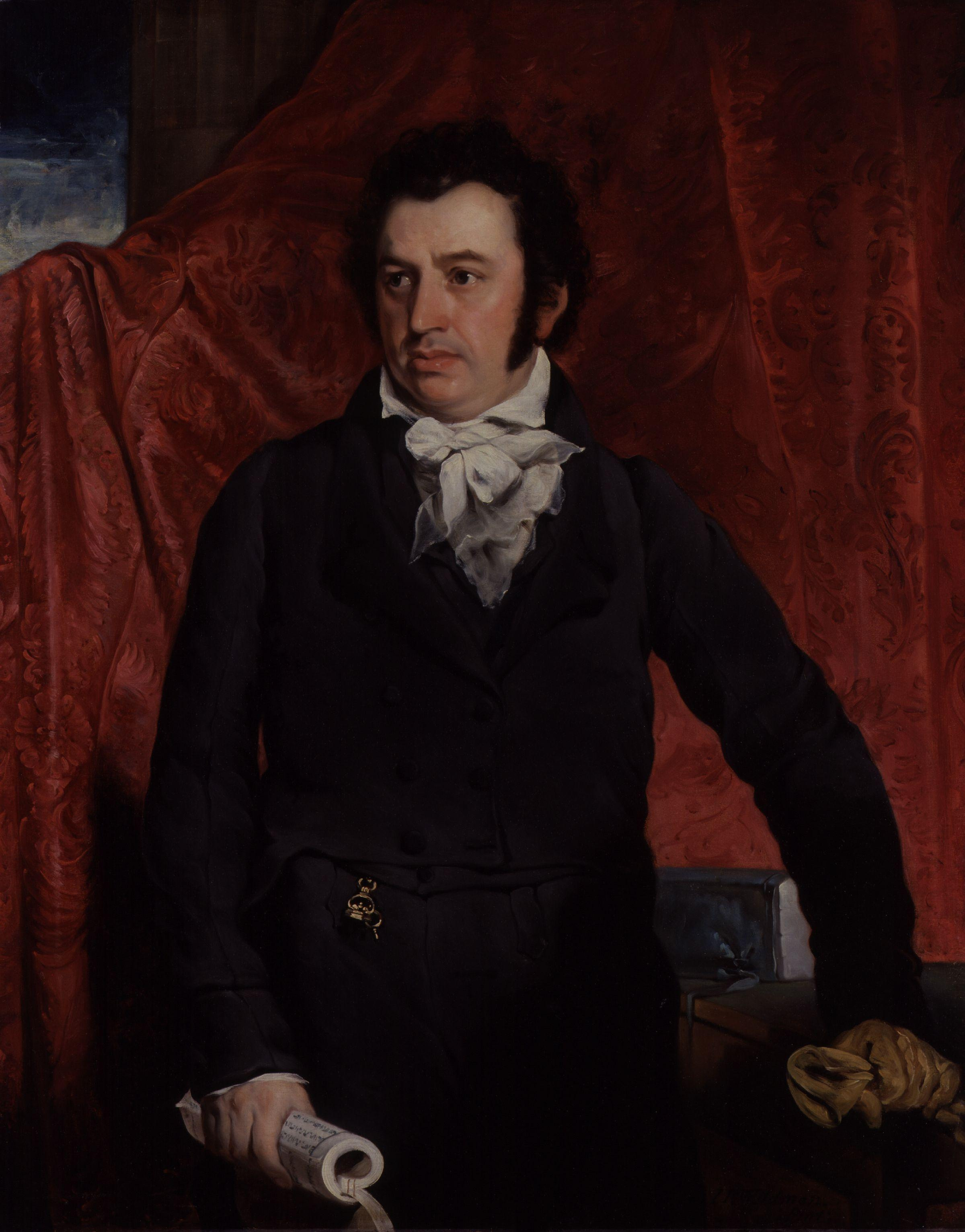
Robert Morrison was the first Protestant missionary in China.

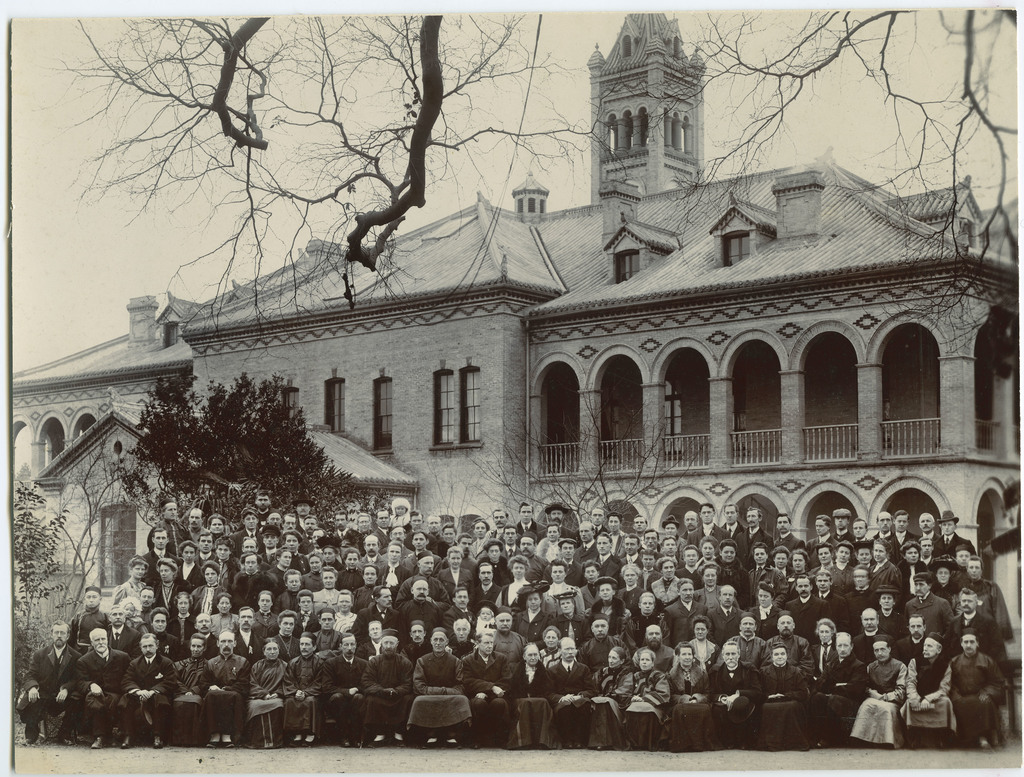
Missionary Conference, Chengdu, 1908

This is a list of notable Protestant missionaries in China by agency. Beginning with the arrival of Robert Morrison in 1807 and ending in 1953 with the departure of Arthur Matthews and Dr. Rupert Clark of the China Inland Mission, thousands of foreign Protestant missionaries and their families, lived and worked in China to spread Christianity, establish schools, and work as medical missionaries.

== Statistics ==
Year	Number of Missionaries
1807	1
1840	20
1858	81
1865	189
1874	436
1893	1,324
1906	3,833
1918	6,395
1926	8,325
1928	4,375
1930	6,346
1953	0

In 1900, with a Protestant missionary presence in China of about 2,500, 1,400 of the missionaries were British, 1,000 were Americans, and 100 were from continental Europe, mostly Scandinavia. By 1926, about one half of the Protestant missionaries were American. The United Kingdom provided most of the remaining one-half with substantial numbers from Canada, Australia, Germany, and Scandinavia. Approximately 160 Protestant missionary societies were present in China with a variety of functions including education and medicine as well as proselytizing. Only about a dozen of the missionary societies had a large presence.

1926 was the peak year for the number of Protestant missionaries assigned to China. About 8,000 missionaries were in the country. Latourette estimates that in 1926, 3,000 Protestant missionaries were men, 2,400 were wives, and 2,600 were unmarried women. Of that 8,000 about 1,500 were on leave in their home countries, leaving about 6,500 missionaries in-country at that time. Civil war and internal strive caused a reduction in their numbers after 1926.

The Protestant missionaries began with a base of zero converts to Chistianity in 1807 which increased to about 500,000 Chinese converts in the 1930s. By contrast, Roman Catholic missionaries in China totalled about 3,100 and they had about two million converts. Catholic missionaries had been working in the country since the 16th century. There was little contact between the Protestant and Catholic missionaries.

== Notable missionaries and missionary organizations ==
=== American Board of Commissioners for Foreign Missions ===
Name	Chinese name	Born	Died	Arrived in China	Province(s) stationed
William Scott Ament	梅子明（梅威良）	September 14, 1851	January 8, 1909	1877	Zhili, Beijing
Irenaeus J. Atwood	文阿德	1849	1913	1882	Shanxi
Caleb Cook Baldwin	摩嘉立	1820	1911	1848	Fujian
Dyer Ball	波乃耶	June 3, 1796	1866	1841	Macao, Hong Kong, Canton
Harlan Page Beach	毕海澜	April 4, 1854	March 4, 1933	1883	Beijing
Willard Livingstone Beard	裨益知	1865	1947	1894	Fujian
Edward Bliss	福益华	December 10, 1865	January 22, 1960	1893	Fujian
Henry Blodget	白漢理	1825	1903	1854	Shanghai, Tianjin, Beijing
Elijah Coleman Bridgman	裨治文	April 22, 1801	November 2, 1861	1830	Hong Kong, Guangdong; Shanghai
Eliza Jane Gillett Bridgman	裨爱利莎	May 6, 1805	November 10, 1871	1845	Hong Kong, Guangdong; Shanghai; Beijing
James Granger Bridgman		December, 1820	December 6, 1850	1844	Guangdong
Samuel William Bonney		March 8, 1815	July 27, 1864	1845	Hong Kong; Guangdong
Seneca Cummings	簡明	1817	1856	1848	Fujian
Justus Doolittle	盧公明	1824	1880	1850	Fujian
Charles Robert Hager	喜嘉理	October 27, 1851	July 13, 1917	March 30, 1883	Guangdong, Hong Kong
Charles Hartwell	夏察理	1825	1905	1853	Fujian
Arthur William Hummel, Sr.	恒慕义	1884	1975	1914	Shanxi
Stephen Johnson	杨顺	1803	1886	1847	Fujian
Walter Henry Judd	周以德	September 25, 1898	February 13, 1994	1925	Fujian
Daniel Jerome MacGowan		1815	1893		Zhejiang
Luella Miner		1861	1935	1888	Zhili
Peter Parker	伯駕	1804	1888	1834	Guangdong
Watts Orson Pye	裴万铎	1878	1926	1907	Shanxi
Gertrude Chaney Pye	裴钱闺德	1885	1966	1909	Shanxi
Lyman Burt Peet		March 1, 1809	January 11, 1879	1846	Fujian
Horace Tracy Pitkin	毕得经	1869	1900	1897	Zhili
Arthur Henderson Smith	明恩溥	July 18, 1845	August 31, 1932	1872	
Charles Alfred Stanley	山嘉利	1835	1910	1862	Tianjin
Edwin Stevens		August 1802	January 5, 1837	1832	Guangdong
Martin Luther Stimson	冕路德	1856	1935	1881	Shanxi
Charles Daniel Tenney	丁家立	June 27, 1857	March 14, 1930	1882	Shanxi
Elwood Gardner Tewksbury		1865	1945	1890	Beijing Tongzhou
Ira Tracy		January 15, 1806	November 10, 1875	1833	Guangdong, Singapore
Percy Theodore Watson	万德生	July 7, 1880	1963	1909	Shanxi
Samuel Wells Williams	衛三畏	September 22, 1812	1884	1833	Guangdong

=== American Presbyterian Mission ===
Name	Chinese name	Born	Died	Arrived in China	Province(s) stationed
Pearl S. Buck	賽珍珠	June 26, 1892	March 6, 1973	late 1892	Jiangsu, Nanjing
Calvin Norris Caldwell		1861	1937	1888	
Eleanor Chestnut				1905	Lien Chow, Canton, China
Richard Cole				1844	Shanghai
Ira Miller Condit			April 24, 1915	1860	San Francisco, California, USA Chinese in US
Hunter Corbett	郭顯德	December 8, 1835	January 7, 1920	1864	Yantai, Shandong
Jonathan Fisher Crossette				1870	Tongzhou
Michael Simpson Culbertson		January 18, 1819	August 25, 1862	1844	Shanghai, Zhejiang
John Marshall Willoughby Farnham	法納姆			1850	Shanghai
Courtenay Hughes Fenn	芳泰瑞	April 11, 1866	1927	1893	Beijing
George F. Fitch (and wife, Mary)				1870	Shanghai, Suzhou
John Booth French				1846	Guangdong
Mary H. Fulton	富马利	1854	1927	1884	Guangzhou
William Gamble	姜别利			1858	Zhejiang, Shanghai
Samuel R. Gayley	蓋利			1858	Shandong
James Robert Graham III		1898	1982	1921	Jiangsu, Shanxi
Andrew Patton Happer	哈巴安德			1844	Guangdong
Milo Arthur Van Norman Hogan		April 20, 1891	August 4, 1980	1919	Lianzhou
Elias B. Inslee				1857	Shanghai
Asher Raymond Kepler				1901	Xiangtan, Hunan, China
Eliza Ellen Leonard		November 16, 1866	October 17, 1924	1895	Beijing
Ralph Charles Lewis			Sept 14,1991	1933-1952	
	嘉約翰	1824	1901	1854	Guangdong
Augustus Ward Loomis				1844	
Reuben Lowrie				1854	Shanghai
Walter Macon Lowrie	婁理華			1842	
Samuel Newell D. Martin				1850	Zhejiang
William Alexander Parsons Martin	丁韙良	April 10, 1827	1916	1850	Zhejiang, Shanghai, Beijing
Calvin Wilson Mateer	狄考文	1836	1908	1863/4	Shandong
Henry M. McCandliss				1885	Hainan
Divie Bethune McCartee	麥嘉締	1820	July 17, 1900	1844	Zhejiang
Paul Whiting McClintock		January 12, 1869	March 18, 1947	1892	Hainan
Rebecca Ewing McClintock		September 20, 1869	March 7, 1968	1892	Hainan
Margaret Ray Melrose				1890	Hainan
Charles Rogers Mills	梅理士				Shandong
Wilson Plumer Mills					
Mary Margaret Moninger				1915	Hainan
John Livingstone Nevius	倪維思	1829	1893	1853	Zhejiang, Shandong, Korea
Harriet Newell Noyes	那夏理			1867/8	Guangdong
John Parker (physician)					
Charles Finney Preston			17 July 1877	1854	Guangdong
John Winn Quarterman				1846	Zhejiang
Richard Quarterman					Zhejiang
Henry Van Vleck Rankin				1848	Zhejiang
Anna Cunningham Safford					
James Metcalf Shaw		1849	1876	1874	Penglai, Shandong
Robert Elliott Speer	史畢爾	1867	1947		
William Speer				1846	
Ernest Black Struthers	杜儒德	28 April 1886	22 May 1977	20 February 1913	Hong Kong, Jinan
Joseph Clarke Thomson		10 April 1853	18 Nov 1926	November 1881	Guangdong, Macao
Matilda S. Thurston	德本康	1875	1958	1902	Changsha, Nanjing
R. Q. Way				1844	
J. K. Wight				1848	Shanghai
John Elias Williams	文懷恩	1871	March 24, 1927	1899	Nanjing
Katherine L Schaeffer	謝高福	March 1, 1867	April 8, 1931	1894	Hainan

=== American Southern Presbyterian Mission ===
Name	Chinese name	Born	Died	Arrived in China	Province(s) stationed
Lemuel Nelson Bell	鍾愛華	1894	1973	1916	Jiangsu
Francis Wilson Price	毕范宇	1895	1974	1923	Nanjing
Absalom S. Sydenstricker	賽兆祥	August 19, 1852	August 31, 1931	1881	Jiangsu
John Leighton Stuart	司徒雷登	1876	1962		Nanjing
John Walker Vinson	闻声	1880	1931	1907	Jiangsu

=== American Methodist Episcopal Mission ===
Name	Chinese name	Born	Died	Arrived in China	Province(s) stationed
Paul Bagley					
Stephen Livingstone Baldwin	保灵	1835	1902	1858	Fuzhou
James Whitford Bashford	柏锡福	1849	1919	1904	Beijing
Joseph Beech	畢啟	1867	1954	1899	Sichuan
William Nesbitt Brewster	蒲魯士				
Lucinda L. Coombs					
Ailie Gale		1878	1958	1908	Jianxi, Anhui, Sichuan, Shanghai
Francis Dunlap Gamewell	贾腓力	1857	1950		
Otis Gibson					
George Richmond Grose	谷卓志	1869	1953	1924	
Robert Samuel Maclay	麥利和				
Erastus Wentworth	万为	August 5, 1813	May 26, 1886	1854	Foochow
L.N. Wheeler	裴来尔				
John Wherry	韋利				
Moses Clark White	懷特				
Isaac William Wiley	怀礼	29 March 1825	22 November 1884	1851	Foochow
Marquis Lafayette Wood	1829–1893	1860–1866	Shanghai		
Beulah Woolston	娲标礼	August 3, 1828	October 24, 1886	1859	Foochow
Perry Oliver Hanson	韓丕瑞	1875	1967		Shandong
Hiram Harrison Lowry	劉海瀾				

=== American Southern Methodist Mission ===
Name	Chinese name	Born	Died	Arrived in China	Province(s) stationed
Young John Allen	林樂知				Shanghai
David L. Anderson	孙乐文	1850	1911	1882	Suzhou
John W. Cline	葛贲恩	1868	1955	1897	Suzhou
William G.E. Cunningham	耿惠廉			1852	
John Burrus Fearn	斐尧臣	1871	1926	1895	Suzhou, Shanghai
Laura Askew Haygood	海淑德	1845	1900		Shanghai
Benjamin Jenkins	秦右	1815	1871	1848	Shanghai
James William Lambuth	藍柏				
Walter Russell Lambuth	藍華德				
Fred P. Manget	孟杰	1880	1979	1909	Huzhou
Walter Buckner Nance	文乃史	1868	1964	1896	Suzhou
William Hector Park	柏乐文	1858	1927	1882	Suzhou
Alvin Pierson Parker	潘慎文	1850	1924	1875	Suzhou
John Abner Snell	苏迈尔医生	1880	1936	1907	Suzhou
Hubert L Sone	宋煦伯			1920	Suzhou, Huzhou, Nanjing
Charles Tayor	戴乐安(戴作士)	1819	1897	1848	Shanghai

=== American Southern Baptist Mission ===
Name	Chinese name	Born	Died	Arrived in China	Province(s) stationed
A. B. Cabaniss					Shanghai
Tarleton Perry Crawford	高第丕	May 8, 1821	1902	1852	Shandong
Thomas T. Devan				1844	Hong Kong, Canton
James T. Dickenson					
Charles Washington Gaillard			July 1862		Macau, Guangdong
Rosewell Hobart Graves					
J. L. Holmes	花蘭芷				Jiangsu, Shandong
Sophie Stephens Lanneau		August 19, 1881	June 4, 1963		
Lottie Moon	慕拉第	December 12, 1840	December 24, 1912	1873	Shandong
Cicero Washington Pruitt	蒲其維	January 31, 1857	December 27, 1946	1882	Huangxian, Shandong
Anna Seward Pruitt	蒲安娜	May 16, 1862	June 20, 1948	1887	Huangxian, Shandong
Ida Pruitt	蒲愛德	1888	July 24, 1985	1888	Huangxian, Beijing
Alanson Reed					
Frank J. Rawlinson	樂靈生				
John Griffith Schilling					Hong Kong
Henrietta Hall Shuck	叔何顯理	October 28, 1817	November 27, 1844	September 1836	Hong Kong
Jehu Lewis Shuck	叔未士	1812	1863	September 1836	Hong Kong, Guangzhou, Shanghai
Matthew Tyson Yates	晏瑪太	1819	1888	1847	Shanghai

=== China Inland Mission ===
Name	Chinese name	Born	Died	Arrived in China	Province(s) stationed in
David R. Adam		c. 1864	1915	1887	
W.H. Aldis		1871	1948	1897	
David Howard Adeney	艾德理	1911	1994	1934	China, Singapore
Paul Ernest Adolph		1901		1929	
Gordon Hudson Aldis		1905	1988	1931	
Benjamin Bagnall	貝格	c. 1844	1900	1873	
Frederick W. Baller	鮑康寧	November 21, 1852	August 12, 1922	November 5, 1873	Anhui, Jiangsu
Mary (Bowyer) Baller	包瑪莉	c. 1843	1909	September 30, 1866	Zhejiang
Stephen Paul Barchet	巴克敵	1843	October 5, 1909	July 24, 1865	Zhejiang
Susan Barnes				September 30, 1866	Zhejiang
David Barratt		c. 1872	1900	1897	
Howard G. Barrie		c. 1871		1903	
Harold Dewey Hayward		1989	1991		Xinjiang
Mrs. (Helen) Hayward		1897	1989		Xinjiang
Mary Elizabeth Bausum		October 15, 1849	August 3, 1926	September 30, 1866	Zhejiang
Ivor Cuthbert Beauchamp	章愛甫	1900	1971	1929	Sichuan
Montagu Proctor-Beauchamp	章必成	1860	1939	1885	Baoning, Sichuan
George A. Birch, Canadian		c. 1905			Mission headquarters in Shanghai in 1934
Emily Blatchley	巴愛梅	c. 1842	July 26, 1874	September 30, 1866	Zhejiang, Jiangsu
Rudolf Alfred Bosshardt	薄復禮 (Bo Fuli)	January 1, 1897	November 6, 1993	1922	Guizhou
E. A. Barclay Botham		c. 1861	1934	1884	
John Brock	博春臣	c. 1866	1942	1887	
Albert Hudson Broomhall	海國祿	August 31, 1862	August 19, 1934	1884	Taiyuan, Shanxi; Hebei
Alfred James Broomhall	海恒博	December 6, 1911	May 11, 1994	1938	Yunnan, Thailand, Philippines
Theodora Janet (Churchill) Broomhall		June 13, 1913	November 15, 2000		Yunnan, Thailand, Philippines
Amelia Gertrude Broomhall (Hoste)	海寬愛	May 18, 1861	April 12, 1944	1884	Taiyuan, Shanxi
Edith Elizabeth Broomhall (Ritchie)	海懿德	October 23, 1867	1973	1889	Shanxi
Edith Marjory Broomhall	海寬厚	September 7, 1895	June 3, 1984	1924	
Marshall Broomhall	海恩波	July 17, 1866	October 24, 1937	1890	Anhui, Shanxi
Mrs. F. W. Broumton					
James F. Broumton	包蘭頓	c. 1850	1910	1875	
Elizabeth Burton		c. 1872	1900	1898	
Alice Mildred Cable	蓋群英	February 21, 1878	April 30, 1952	1902	Shanxi, Gansu, Xinjiang
James Cameron	賈美仁	c. 1845	1892	1875	
John Edwin Cardwell	高學海	1830	1918	1868	Shanghai
William Wharton Cassels	蓋士利	1858	1925	1885	Baoning, Sichuan
Grace Ciggie Stott	曹雅直夫人		January 24, 1922	1870	Zhejiang
George W. Clarke		c. 1849	1919	1875	
Mrs. (Rossier) Clarke					
Samuel R. Clarke	記載了	c. 1853	1946	1878	Yunnan, Guizhou
Mrs. (Fausett) Clarke					
T. A. P. Clinton	寧鮑秀珍	c. 1873	1909	1894	
William Cooper	顧正道	1858	1900	1881	Anking, Anhui
Florence Corderoy (Broomhall)	海恩波太太	1871	1957	1894	
John Joseph Coulthard	郭豁達	1859	1956	1879	Zhenjiang
George A. Cox	計安全	c. 1862	1939	1888	
Anna Crickmay		1852	1908	1878	Shanxi
George Crombie	甘比治			1865	Zhejiang
Robert Cunningham	顧福安 / 顧福華	1883	1942	1907	Kangding, Sichuan
Louise Desgraz	伙樂義		November 28, 1907	September 30, 1866	Zhejiang
Henry Dick				1883	
Adam C. Dorward			1888	1878	
A. W. Douthwaite	稻惟德				
Frederick Charles Henry Dreyer	丁良才	1872	1953	1895	
George Duncan	童跟福		February 12, 1873	September 30, 1866	Zhejiang
Gordon Dunn				1931	
Marvin Dunn			Dec 23, 1989	1932	Anhwei
Miriam Jessie Dunn (Toop)		Jan 11, 1913	Dec 5, 1999	1940	Anhwei
George F. Easton	義世敦	1853	1938	1875	
James Huston Edgar	葉長清	1872	1936	1898	Kangding, Sichuan
W. L. Elliston					
Arthur Henry Faers		1863	July 28, 1951		Sichuan, Shandong
Emil Fischbacher	巴富羲醫生	1903	1933	1932	Xinjiang
Annie (née Bell, formerly Bohannon) Fishe		April 22, 1844	March 26, 1926	March 3, 1868	Zhejiang, Taizhou
Charles Thomas Fishe			June 24, 1928	November 10, 1869	
Edward T. Fishe		1846	September 18, 1877	March 3, 1868	Guizhou
William S. Fleming	明鑑光	1867	1898	November 4, 1898	Guizhou
James O. Fraser	富能仁	1886	September 25, 1938	1910	Yunnan
Evangeline Frances "Eva" French	馮貴珠	1869	July 8, 1960	1893	Shanxi, Gansu, Xinjiang
Francesca Law French	馮貴石	December 12, 1871	August 2, 1960	1893	Gansu, Xinjiang
Archibald Edward Glover	蓋落窪	1861	1954	1897	Shanxi
Robert Hall Glover		1871	1947	1894	
Athelstan Goold		September 19, 1865	October 6, 1943	1891	Chefoo (Yantai), Shandong
Emma Goold (Steele)		February 22, 1867	October 16, 1916	1890	Chefoo (Yantai), Shandong
Harry G. Gould	高立德				
Adam Grainger		c1867	1921	1889	Sichuan
Rhoda Grainger (Broman)		c1867			Sichuan
Jessie Gregg	賈貴安				
Gershom Whitfield Guinness	金純仁	1869	1927	1897	
Henry Guinness					
Mary Geraldine Guinness	金樂婷	December 25, 1865	June 6, 1949	1888	Henan
Pauline Hamilton			April 9, 1988	1947	
Brook Hannah		September 28, 1874	January 21, 1961		Sichuan
J. Charles Harlow		1876	1957	1905	Shanxi
Edith Harlow		1875	1954	1905	Shanxi
George Kaufelt Harris		1887	1962		Gansu
Arnolis Hayman		1890	January 1971	1913	Guizhou
Adolf Hermann		1880	August 1967	October 23, 1905	Hebei
Celia Horne					
Dixon Edward Hoste	何斯德	July 23, 1861	May 11, 1946	1885	Shanxi; Henan others
Frank Houghton	華福蘭	1894	1972	December 19, 1920	Sichuan
Henry Hunt	而洪亨利				
Mrs. Hunt					
George Hunter	胡進潔	1861	1946	1889	Ningxia; Xinjiang
Josiah Alexander Jackson	蔡文才		1909	September 30, 1866	Zhejiang
Anna Sofie Jakobsen		November 8, 1860	1913	1885	Shanxi
Francis James	秀耀春	1851	June 20, 1900	1876	
Alfred Jennings					
Charles Henry Judd	祝名揚	c. 1842	October 23, 1919	March 3, 1868	
James Herbert Kane		1910	1988	1935	Anhui
Duncan Kay		c. 1863	1900	1884	
Frank A. Keller	葛蔭華	c. 1863	1945	1897	
Rose Sarah Rasey		1896	1992	1929	Shanghai
		1907	1880		
Miss Kidd					
George King	金輔仁	c. 1857		1875	Shaanxi
Mrs. (Snow) King					
Margaret King	金寶恩				
John Kuhn	楊志英				Yunnan
Isobel Miller Kuhn	楊宓貴靈	1901	1957		Yunnan
Leslie Theodore Lyall	賴恩融	1905	1996	1929	Shandong; Shanxi
Percy C. Mather	馬爾昌	1884	1933	1910	Anhui; Xinjiang
Robert Arthur Mathews	馬良箴	1912	1978	1938	
Robert Henry Mathews		1877	1970	1908	Henan, Anhui, Sichuan, Shanghai
Wilda Mathews					
John McCarthy	麥加弟	c. 1840	June 21, 1911	February 23, 1867	Yangzhou, Zhejiang
Jessie McDonald	美德純	1888	1980	1913	
Stewart McKee	紀長生	c. 1863	1900	1884	
Elizabeth (Rose) Meadows			November 3, 1890	September 30, 1866	Zhejiang
James Joseph Meadows	宓道生	September 1, 1835	December 12, 1914	May 24, 1862	Zhejiang
George Edgar Metcalf		March 3, 1879	January 15, 1956	October 23, 1906	Yunnan
Elizabeth Mary (Donnelly) Metcalf		January 19, 1891	August 25, 1966	November 28, 1917	Yunnan
Alice Amelia Miles (Broomhall)	海國祿太太	February 22, 1864	May 20, 1953		Shanxi
Marianne Murray		1852	1931	1884	
George Nicoll	李格爾			1875	
Mrs. Nicoll					
Archibald Orr-Ewing	榮晃熙	1857	1930	1886	Pingyao, Shanxi
Rose Palmer					
F. S. Parker					
George Parker	巴格道		1931	1876	
Mrs. Parker					
Frank Ernest Parry	巴貝山	1889	1950		
Edward Pearse	貝貽士				
Arthur Twistleton Polhill-Turner	杜明德	1862	1935	1885	Sichuan
Cecil Henry Polhill-Turner	寶耀庭	1860	1938	1885	Sichuan, Qinghai
Sam Pollard	柏格理	April 20, 1864	September 16, 1915	1885	Yunnan
Gladstone Porteous	张尔昌	1874	1944	1904	Yunnan
Henry Reid	李愛恩			1867	Jiangsu
Arthur TF Reynolds	林得时	1909	2001	1933	Shanxi, Sichuan
R Joy Reynolds (Callis)		1923	1995	1946	Sichuan
Gilbert Ritchie	芮明哲	1872	1957	1894	
Hattie Rice	賴海蒂	1858	July 13, 1900	1893	Shanxi
Harry French Ridley		June 1862	1944	November 13, 1890	Qinghai, Xinjiang
John Morris Rockness		1911	1998	1936	Yunnan
Mary (Bell) Rudland	En-Sing	April 22, 1844	October 23, 1874	September 30, 1866	Zhejiang, Taizhou
William David Rudland	路惠理	February 1839	January 10, 1921	September 30, 1866	Zhejiang, Jiangsu
Alexander R. Saunders	索行仁	c. 1862	1934	1887	
Charles Schmidt				1867	Jiangsu
R. Harold A. Schofield	賜斐德	1851	1883	1880	Yantai, Shandong
Otto F. Schoerner	石愛樂	1906	2008	1931	Xinjiang, Gansu
Stanley Peregine Smith	司米德	1861	1931	1885	Shanxi
Henry Soltau	索樂道			1875	
Betty Stam	史文明	February 22, 1906	December 8, 1934	1931	Shandong
John Stam	師達能	January 18, 1907	December 8, 1934	1932	Shandong
Florence Mary Hannah (Tapscott) Steven		March 26, 1866	May 11, 1936	April 1, 1886	Jiangxi; Shanghai
Frederick Arthur Steven		June 13, 1858	March 6, 1931	April 17, 1883	Yunnan; Jiangxi; Shanghai
John Whiteford Stevenson	范明德	1844	1918	February 6, 1866	Zhejiang; Shanghai
George Stott	曹雅直		April 21, 1889	October 1865	Zhejiang
Charles Studd	施達德	1860	1931	1885	Shanxi
Priscilla Stewart (a.k.a. Priscilla Studd)	施達德夫人		1929	1887	Shanxi
Frederick Howard Taylor	戴存義	November 25, 1862	August 15, 1946	September 30, 1866	Anking, Anhui
Henry Taylor	戴亨利			1873	Henan
Herbert Hudson Taylor	戴存仁	April 3, 1861	June 6, 1950	September 30, 1866	
James Hudson Taylor	戴德生	May 21, 1832	June 3, 1905	March 1, 1854	Zhejiang, many others
Jennie Faulding Taylor	福珍妮	October 6, 1843	July 31, 1904	September 30, 1866	Zhejiang, many others
Maria Hudson Taylor	瑪利亞	February 3, 1867	September 28, 1897	1884	Zhenjiang
Maria Jane Taylor	瑪利亞	January 16, 1837	July 23, 1870	1852	Zhejiang, Jiangsu
Peter Torjesen	葉永青	November 28, 1892	December 14, 1939	1919	Shanxi
Thomas Torrance		1871	1959	1895	Sichuan
(Miss) E. E. Turner					
Joshua J. Turner	德治安	1854	1937	1876	Shanxi
Joan Wales		November 29, 1916	November 15, 2016	October 1945	Sichuan, Thailand
Robert Walker		c. 1892	1975	1919	Henan
James Williamson	衛養生	c. 1838	1896	September 30, 1866	Fenghua, Zhejiang
Miss E. Wilson					
Marcus F Wood				c1882	Anhui
Florence Young		October 10, 1856	May 28, 1940	1891	

=== Church Missionary Society ===
Name	Chinese name	Born	Died	Arrived in China	Province(s) stationed in
Frederick Boreham	羅四維	1888	1966	1917	Mianyang, Sichuan
John Shaw Burdon	包爾騰	1826	1907		Shanghai
Robert Henry Cobbold	柯播義				Zhejiang
William H. Collins					Shanghai, Beijing
Arthur William Cribb	金亞德				Fujian
Vyvyan Donnithorne	董宜篤	1886	1968		Sichuan
John Fryer	傅蘭雅	1839	1928	1861	Hong Kong, Beijing, Shanghai
Frederick Foster Gough	高富，岳牧師				Zhejiang
John Hobson					Shanghai
John Holden	侯禮敦	1882	1949		Sichuan, Guangxi, Hunan
James Heywood Horsburgh	何詩白	1852	1935	1883	Sichuan, Zhejiang
Montagu Robert Lawrence		1885	1971	1921 or 1922	Paoning & Mienchu, Sichuan
John Howard Lechler	路景雲	1883	1977		Sichuan
David Duncan Main		1856	1934	1881	
Edward Candish Millard		1868	1900	1891	Fuzhou
Edward Theophilus Russell Moncrieff					Hong Kong
Arthur Evans Moule	慕雅德	1836	1918	1861	Zhejiang, Shanghai
George Evans Moule	慕稼谷	1828	1912	1858	Zhejiang
Sydney James Nightingale		1871	1953	1899	Fujian
David Macdonald Paton					
William Armstrong Russell	祿賜悦理	1821	1879		Zhejiang
Douglas Noel Sargent		1907	1979		
George Smith	施美夫	June 19, 1815	December 14, 1871	September 25, 1844	Hong Kong
Hubert Gordon Thompson	唐普森医生	1878	1953	1906	Guangxi (Beihai), Yunnan (Kunming), Zhejiang (Hangzhou), Shanghai
Jarvis Downman Valentine				1864	Zhejiang
William Welton	温敦				Fujian
John Richard Wolfe		1832	1915	1861	Fujian (Fuzhou)

=== English Presbyterian Mission ===
Name	Chinese name	Born	Died	Arrived in China	Province(s) stationed
Thomas Barclay	巴克禮	November 21, 1849	October 5, 1935	1875	Taiwan
William Chalmers Burns	賓惠廉	April 1, 1815	April 4, 1868	1847	Jiangsu, Fujian, Guangdong
John Carnegie					
Carstairs Douglas	杜嘉德	December 27, 1830	July 26, 1877	1855	Fujian
James Laidlaw Maxwell	馬雅各	March 18, 1836	March 1921	1864	Taiwan
James Laidlaw Maxwell, Junior	馬雅各二世				
John Preston Maxwell	馬士敦				
Campbell Naismith Moody					
George Smith					
James H. Young					
Margaret Ross			1938	1897-c.1926	Amoy

=== London Missionary Society ===
Name	Chinese name	Born	Died	Arrived in China	Province(s) stationed
Marjory Causer M.Sc.		January 27, 1910	May 13, 2010	1938	Chongqing, Nanjing and Sichuan
James Anderson				December 27, 1865 – May 5, 1870	Canton
Thomas Beighton					
Evan Bryant		April 22, 1839	March 28, 1918		
Hedley Bunton	潘 頓 牧 師	January 18, 1906	October 23, 1997	1933	Guangzhou, Hong Kong
J. R. Carmichael				1862	Guangdong, Shandong
John Chalmers					
John Fullerton Cleland		1821	November 29, 1901	1845 or 1846	
Thomas Cochrane, 1866-1953					
David Collie					
Hugh Cowie - Amoy - his two daughters Annie S M Clowie and Helena Margaret Cowie were born there					
Evan Davies		1805	June 18, 1864		Penang, Singapore
Robert Dawson					
George Douglas		Before 1890		Before 1901	Liaoyang, Manchuria
John Dudgeon		1837	1901	December 1863	Beijing
Maria Tarn Dyer		ca. 1808	October 21, 1846		Penang, Malacca, Singapore
Samuel Dyer	台約爾	January 20, 1804	October 24, 1843	1843	Penang, Malacca, Singapore
Joseph Edkins	艾約瑟	December 19, 1823	April 23, 1905	July 22, 1848	Shanghai, Beijing
John Evans					
William Fairbrother					
Robert Fleming					
Arnold Foster					
Samuel Kidd					
James Gentle					Jiangsu
William Gillespie					
Thomas Gillfillan					
James Gilmour	季雅各	June 12, 1843	May 21, 1891	1870	Mongolia
Samuel Lavington Hart					
James Henderson					
James Humphreys					
George H. Huttman					
Henri Julius Hinschberg					
Benjamin Hobson	合信				
Thomas Hall Hudson	胡德邁				
James Hyslop					
John Ince		August 20, 1795	April 24, 1825		Penang, Malacca
Griffith John	楊格非	December 14, 1831	July 25, 1912	September, 1855	Hubei, Hunan, Sichuan, Hubei
Battison Kay					
William Lea					
Jonathan Lees				1862	Tianjin
James Legge	理雅各	December 20, 1815	November 29, 1897		
Mary Isabella Legge					
Eric Liddell	李愛銳	January 16, 1902	February 21, 1945	Born in Tianjin; arrived as missionary in 1925	Tianjin, Hebei
William Lockhart	雒魏林				
John Macgowan	麦高温	July 23, 1835	March 17, 1922	1860	Xiamen
John Kenneth MacKenzie		August 25, 1850	April 1, 1888	1875	Hankow, Tianjin
Walter Henry Medhurst	麥都思	April 29, 1796	January 24, 1857		
Rachel Cowie Milne					
William Charles Milne					
William Milne	米憐	1785	1822	1813	Macau, Guangdong
Samuel Milton					
Robert Morrison	馬禮遜	January 5, 1782	August 1, 1834	September 4, 1807	Guangdong, Macau
John Robert Morrison	摩利臣	1814	October, 1843	(born in Macau)	Guangdong, Hong Kong
Mary Morton					Guangdong, Macau
William Muirhead	慕維廉				
Maria Newell Gützlaff					
George Sydney Owen and Emma Owen		24 January 1843	8 February 1914	5 February 1866	Shanghai, Peking, Tianjin
Fred C. Roberts		September 9, 1862	June 6, 1894	September 1887	Tientsin
James Sadler					
John Slater					
John Smith					
Benjamin Southwell					
Alexander Stronach					
John Stronach	施敦力				
Robert Jermain Thomas	로버트 토머스				(Korea)
Jacob Tomlin					
Claudius Henry Thomsen	湯生				
F. S. Turner					
Bernard Upward					
Alexander Williamson	韋廉臣	December 5, 1829	September 1890		
James Williamson					
Robert Wilson					
Samuel Wolfe					
Dr Richard Wolfendale LRCP&S Edin		June 25, 1866 Tutbury Staffs England	March 29, 1921 Luchow China	November 1896	Chungking (Chongqing) and Luchow (Luzhow)
Alexander Wylie	偉烈亞力	April 6, 1815	February 10, 1887		
William Young					

=== Mission Covenant Church of Sweden ===
Name	Uyghur or Chinese name	Born	Died	Arrived-departed	Province(s) stationed
Gustaf Ahlbert		1884	1943		Xinjiang
Albert Andersson					Xinjiang
Gerda Gemina Bernhardina Andersson					Xinjiang
Oscar Fabian Konstantin Andersson					Xinjiang
Gustaf Adolf Arell		26 May 1886	1976		Xinjiang
Johanna Katarina Arell (née Larsson)		3 January 1890	1984		Xinjiang
Johannes Aveteranian		30 June 1861	11 December 1919	1892–1897	Xinjiang
Magnus Bäcklund		12 December 1866	26 June 1903		Xinjiang
Maja Bergquist		1897	1987	1928–	Xinjiang
Adolf Bohlin		9 March 1873			Xinjiang
Vendla Gustafsson					Xinjiang
David Walter Gustavsson					Xinjiang
Kristian Hermanrud				1929–1933	Xinjiang
Greta Hermanrud				1931–1933	Xinjiang
Adelia Hermansson				1924–1930	Xinjiang
Gunnar Hermansson				1924–1930	Xinjiang
Oskar Hermansson		1889	1951		Xinjiang
Lars Erik Högberg		1858	1924		Xinjiang
Sigrid Högberg		1868			Xinjiang
Nils Fredrik Höijer		1857	20 November 1925	1892	Xinjiang
Elisabeth Höök		1902	18 September 1991	1931–	Xinjiang
Ivar Höök		1903	1944	1931–	Xinjiang
Ester Johansson				1929–	Xinjiang
Obed Simon Johnson		1881	1970	1909	Canton
Ingrid Kangstrom				1929–	Xinjiang
Petrus Kangstrom				1929–	Xinjiang
Frida Lundell		6 March 1899	29 August 1934	1925–1934	Xinjiang
Stina Mårtensson					Xinjiang
Josef Mässrur					Xinjiang
Anna Mässrur (née Nyström)					Xinjiang
Anna Maria Mobeck					Xinjiang
Sigfrid Persson-Moen		1897	1989	1925–	Xinjiang
Ester Moen (née Aronsson)				1925–	Xinjiang
Hilda Lovisa Nordquist		6 April 1881			Xinjiang
John Norstedt			1932	1924–1932	Xinjiang
Helena Nyström					Xinjiang
Rikard Nyström		1884	1943		Xinjiang
Lisa Persson (née Gahns)			1936	1929–1936	Xinjiang
Carl Persson					Xinjiang
Gösta Raquette		1871	1945		Xinjiang
Hanna Raquette					Xinjiang
Elin Roberntz née Jansson				1929–	Xinjiang
Georg Roberntz					Xinjiang
Stina Rydberg					Xinjiang
Ellen Soderberg				1924–	Xinjiang
Elin Karolina Svensson					Xinjiang
Naemi Terning (née Ryden)				1928–	Xinjiang
John Törnquist					Xinjiang
Rachel O. Wingate				1924–1928	Xinjiang

=== Protestant Episcopal Church Mission ===
A list of missionaries of the Episcopal Church (United States) a member province of the worldwide Anglican Communion that served in China from 1835.

In 1912, Episcopal Church missionary activities in China were reorganized with Anglican mission initiatives of the Church of England and other Anglican provinces under the banner of the Chung Hua Sheng Kung Hui.

Name	Chinese name	Born	Died	Arrived in China	Province(s) stationed
William Jones Boone	文惠廉	1 July 1811	17 July 1864	1842	Shanghai
William Jones Boone, Jr.		17 May 1846	5 October 1891		Shanghai
James M. (Ida) Cotter		January 17, 1889	October 1, 1964	1912–1921	
Lydia Mary Fay		1804	5 October 1878	1851	Shanghai
Frederick Rogers Graves		24 October 1858	17 May 1940	1881	Shanghai, Jiangsu
Francis Hanson		27 March 1807	21 October 1873	1835	Canton, Batavia (Indonesia)
James Addison Ingle	殷徳生	11 March 1867	7 December 1903		Hankow
Emma G. Jones			1879	1845	Shanghai
Cleveland Keith			July 1862	1851	
John Liggins		11 May 1829	8 January 1912	1856	Shanghai, Nagasaki (Japan)
Henry Lockwood			November 1883	1835	Canton, Batavia (Indonesia)
Mary J. Morse			March 1879	1845	Shanghai
Robert Nelson		30 November 1819	15 July 1886	1851	Shanghai
Henry M. Parker		1831	October 1861	1859	
John Tevis Points		1830	1860	1851	Shanghai
Francis Lister Hawks Pott	卜舫濟	22 February 1864	7 March 1947		Shanghai
Logan Hebert Roots		27 July 1870	23 September 1945	1896	Wuchang, Hankow
Samuel Isaac Joseph Schereschewsky	施約瑟	6 May 1831	15 October 1906	1859	Shanghai
Edward W. Syle		17 February 1817	5 October 1890	1845	Shanghai, Yokohama (Japan)
Channing Moore Williams		17 July 1829	2 December 1910	1856	Shanghai, Japan
Mary Elizabeth Wood		22 August 1861	1 May 1931	1899	Wuchang

=== English Baptist Missionary Society ===
Name	Dates in China	Province(s) stationed
Alfred G. Jones	1877–1905	Shandong
Arthur Gostick Shorrock BA	1890–1925	Sianfu, Principal of Bible School
Maud Mary (née Doulton) Shorrock BA	1900–1925	Sianfu, Principal of Girls' School
Moir Black Duncan MA, LLD	1892–1906	Sianfu, Shansi
Jessie Chalmers Duncan (née Lister)	1892–1906	Sianfu, Shansi
Evan Morgan MA LLD	1896–	Sianfu, Shansi, Shanghai
F Madeley MA	1889–	Sianfu, Shantung
Miss Jennie Beckingsale BA	1898–1913	Sianfu
JAC Smith MB ChB	1899–1905	Sianfu
C Cheeseman	1903–1904	Sianfu
Miss Evelyn Minnie Russell	1903–	Sianfu
JC Keyte MA	1904–	Sianfu, Shantung, Peking
Dr Herbert Stanley Jenkins MD FRCS	1904–1913	Sianfu
John Bell ATS	1905–	San Yuan
Miss KM Franklin	1905–	Sianfu, Women's work
Andrew Young LRCP&S	1905–1923	San Yuan
George Andrew Young	1924–1951	Beijing, Shaanxi
J Watson	1906–	Sianfu, Principal of Secondary School
Ernest F Borst-Smith	1906–	Sianfu, Shantung and Shanghai
George A Charter LRCP&S	1908–1919	Sianfu
Mrs Helen Mackay-Scollay (née Watt)	1908–1917;1918–1925	Sianfu
Dr Thomas Scollay	1913–1917; died Ontario, Canada 1918	Sianfu
William Mudd	1909–	Fu Yin Tsun
E J Ellison BSc	1909–1912	Sianfu, Shantung, Kuling
Dr Cecil Frederick Robertson FRCS	1909–1913	Sianfu
W Comerford	1909–	Sianfu, Shantung
H H Stanley	1910–1912	Sianfu
Donald Smith MA	1910–1912	Sianfu, Yenanfu

== Protestant missionaries affiliated with other agencies ==
Name	Chinese name	Birth-Death	Arrived-Departed China	Province(s) stationed	Affiliation
David Abeel	雅裨理	American Reformed Mission			
Mary Ann Aldersey	艾德錫	(independent)			
Roland Allen	羅亞倫	Society for the Propagation of the Gospel			
William Ashmore		American Baptist Missionary Union			
Gladys Aylward	艾偉德	(independent)			
Margaret E. Barber	和受恩	(independent)			
Henry Cornelius Bartel		China Mennonite Mission Society			
Miner Searle Bates	貝德士	United Christian Missionary Society			
Johann Georg Bausum		(independent)			
Robert Pierce Beaver		Evangelical and Reformed Church			
Bernt Berntsen	賁德新	1863–1933	1904–1933	Hebei, Guangxi	Independent
John Birch		World Baptist Fellowship			
Doris Marie Brougham	彭蒙惠				
Arthur Judson Brown		Presbyterian			
M/Mme Bonhoure		Paris Protestant Mission			
Louisa Jane Bryer	布萊爾女士	1878–1958	1891–1926	Fujian	Church of England Zenana Missionary Society
Margaret E. Burton					
Solomon Carpenter		Seventh Day Baptist Mission			
Dugald Christie		Scottish United Presbyterian Mission			
Judson Dwight Collins	柯林斯	Methodist			
Josiah Cox		English Wesleyan Mission			
Alexander Robert Crawford		Irish Presbyterian Mission-Manchuria			
William Dean		American Baptist Missionary Union			
James Dixon		Canadian Presbyterian Mission			
William Taylor Dixon		1879–1959	1909–1912	Guangzhou	Independent
Elihu Doty		American Reformed Mission			
William Arthur Douthwaite					
Dr. Jean Isabelle Dow		Canadian Presbyterian Mission			
Hampden Coit DuBose		American Southern Presbyterian Mission			
August William Edwins		China Mission Society			
Ernst Johann Eitel	歐德理	Basel Mission			
Robert B. Ekvall (1898–1978)		Christian & Missionary Alliance (Gansu, Tibet)			
James Gareth Endicott		United Church of Canada			
Ernst Faber					
Adele M. Fielde		American Baptist Missionary Union			
George Ashmore Fitch		YMCA			
Robert Coventry Forsyth					
Thomas Crosby Fulton		Irish Presbyterian Mission			
Ferdinand Genahr		Rhenish Missionary Society			
William Gillespie		United Presbyterian Mission			
Robert Hall Glover (1871–1947)		Christian & Missionary Alliance			
Josiah Goddard	高德	American Baptist Missionary Union			
Jonathan Goforth	古約翰 or 顧約拿單	Canadian Presbyterian Mission			
Alicia Morey Graham	葛慕義	American Baptist Foreign Mission Society			
David Crockett Graham	葛維漢	American Baptist Foreign Mission Society			
Karl Gützlaff	郭士立 or 郭實臘	Netherlands Missionary Society			
Ronald Owen Hall		Church of England			
William N. Hall		Methodist New Connexion			
Antonius Hambroeck		Dutch Reformed Church			
Theodore Hamberg	韓山文	Basel Mission			
E.H. Hamilton		Southern Presbyterian Mission			
August Hanspach		Berlin Missionary Society			
Victor E.W. Hayward		American Baptist Missionary Union			
David Hill	李修善	English Wesleyan Mission			
Joseph Charles Hoare	霍約瑟主教				
Leonora Howard King		Woman's Foreign Missionary Society			
Miss Gertrude Howe	昊格矩	Woman's Foreign Missionary Society			
William Edwin Hoy		Reformed Church in the United States			
Thomas Hall Hudson		General Baptist Mission			
Edward Hicks Hume	胡美醫生	Yale-in-China Mission			
Arthur W. Hummel, Sr.					
Samuel Hutton		English Wesleyan Mission			
John Innocent		Methodist New Connexion			
Robert A. Jaffray (1873–1945)	翟輔民	Christian & Missionary Alliance (Guangxi)			
Horace Jenkins		American Baptist Missionary Union			
John Jones		Chinese Evangelization Society			
Hendrick Z. Kloekers		Netherlands Chinese Evangelization Society			
Miles Justice Knowlton		American Baptist Missionary Union			
Carl T. Kreyer	金楷理	American Baptist Missionary Union			
Richard Frederick Laughton		Baptist Missionary Society			
Rudolph Lechler	黎力基	Basel Mission			
William G. Lennox					
Wilhelm Lobscheid	羅存德	Chinese Evangelization Society			
Edward Clemens Lord		independent American Baptist Mission			
Jemima (Bausum) Lord		Baptist			
David Willard Lyon	來會理	YMCA			
Donald MacGillivray		Canadian Presbyterian Mission			
George Leslie Mackay	偕叡理 or 馬偕	Canadian Presbyterian Mission			
William Edward Macklin	马林	Foreign Christian Missionary Society			
John Magee	馬驥				
Donald Matheson					
Elizabeth McKechnie		Woman's Union Missionary Society of America			
John Kenneth Mackenzie					
Marie Monsen		Norwegian Lutheran Mission			
William H. Murray		Scottish Bible Society			
Daniel Nelson		Norwegian-American Lutheran Mission Society			
Asta Nilsson	艾喜德	Swedish Free Baptist Church			
Frank Lushington Norris		Society for Propagation of the Gospel			
Frederick W.S. O'Neill		Student Volunteer Movement			
Alvin Ostrom		American Reformed Mission			
George Sidney Owen and Emma Owen		London Missionary Society			
Päivö Parviainen		Hunan, later Taiwan (Finnish Evangelical Lutheran)			
John Parker		Scottish United Presbyterian Mission			
William Parker		Chinese Evangelization Society			
Harry Parsons		United Methodist Church			
George Piercy	俾士	English Wesleyan Mission			
Victor Guy Plymire		Assemblies of God			
William John Pohlman		American Reformed Mission			
Philip Rees (medical missionary)		English Wesleyan Mission			
Karl Ludvig Reichelt		Christian Mission to Buddhists			
Gilbert Reid	李佳白	Mission Among the Higher Classes			
Timothy Richard	李提摩太	Baptist Missionary Society			
Susanna Carson Rijnhart		Disciples of Christ Mission to Tibet			
Johan Alfred Rinell		sv:Svenska Baptistsamfundet (Swedish Baptist Society)			
Issachar Jacox Roberts	羅孝全	American Baptist Missionary Union			
Roy Robertson	羅德聖	The Navigators, sent under the auspices of Youth For Christ			
Halvor Ronning		China Mission Society			
John Ross		Scottish United Presbyterian Mission			
Herman Röttger		Netherlands Missionary Society			
Warren Bartlett Seabury					
Grace Service					
W. Scarborough		English Wesleyan Mission			
Wilhelm Scheid					
David Herbert Schmidt	石大伟	Rhenish Missionary Society			
Charles Ernest Scott					
Charles Perry Scott		Church of England			
Albert Shelton		Foreign Christian Missionary Society			
William Wallace Simpson		Assemblies of God			
Nathan Sites	薛承恩				
Hubert Lafayette Sone		American Southern Methodist Episcopal Mission			
William Edward Soothill	蘇慧廉	United Methodist Free Church			
Frederick Porter Smith		English Wesleyan Mission			
Samuel Joseph Smith		English Wesleyan Mission			
Jacob Speicher		American Baptist Missionary Union			
Edward Burnard Squire					
Eugene Stock					
John Van Nest Talmage	打馬字	American Reformed Mission			
E. H. Thomson					
John Lawrence Thurston					
Elisha Townsend		Canadian Methodist Church			
Minnie Vautrin	魏特琳	United Christian Missionary Society			
Jack Vinson		Southern Presbyterian Mission			
Carl Johannes Voskamp		Berlin Missionary Society			
Abbe Livingston Warnshuis		American Reformed Mission			
Corydon M. Wassell					
Katherine Watney		Church of England Zenana Missionary Society			
Hyla S. Watters					
Andrew Weir		Irish Presbyterian Mission			
Knut B. Westman		Church of Sweden (Lutheran)			
Alexander Williamson		Society for the Diffusion of Christian and General Knowledge Among the Chinese			
Henry Raymond Williamson		Baptist Missionary Society			
Robert Orr Wilson		The University of Nanjing Hospital			
Phillip Winnes		Basel Mission			
Sally Wolfe		English Wesleyan Mission			

== See also ==
- List of Protestant missionary societies in China (1807–1953)
- Church Missionary Society in China
- List of Roman Catholic missionaries in China
- List of Christian missionaries
- Timeline of Christian missions
- Chefoo School
- Lammermuir Party
- Thomas Richardson Colledge
- Grace Dyer Taylor
- Murders of John and Betty Stam
- Kenneth Scott Latourette
- George S. Benson
- China Centenary Missionary Conference
