= Mabel Williamson =

American missionary

Mabel Ruth Williamson (July 1, 1907 - April 18, 2002) was an American missionary to China. She served under the auspices of the China Inland Mission, later known as the Overseas Missionary Fellowship.

Williamson wrote a thesis for Wheaton College "The indigenous church in the New Testament and its relation to the missionary" in 1952.

Williamson is best known for her book Have We No Rights.

Williamson was born in Charles Mix County, South Dakota.

== Bibliography ==
Mabel Williamson, Have We No Rights, Chicago: Moody Press (1957)
