= Lanzhou Shanzishi Church =

Church in Lanzhou, Gansu, China

Lanzhou Shanzishi Church (simplified Chinese: 兰州山字石教堂; traditional Chinese: 蘭州山字石教堂; pinyin: Lánzhōu Shānzìshí Jiàotáng; lit. 'Lanzhou 山 character church'), or Shanzishi Church for short, is a Christian Protestant church located on the bank of the Yellow River in the northeast corner of the Central Square in Lanzhou City, capital of Gansu Province. The church was founded by the China Inland Mission in 1885 and is now the largest church of Lanzhou City and even the whole Northwest China.

== History ==
In 1877, two missionaries from the China Inland Mission introduced the gospel to Gansu. In 1878, the first mission church in Gansu Province was established in Qinzhou (today's Tianshui City).

In 1885, British pastor Baghdaugh preached in Lanzhou. He bought land on Shanzishi Street and built a chapel "Gospel Church of Inland Mission" there.

In 1921, the China Inland Mission invested more than 4,000 silver dollars to build a church on the original site of Shanzishi Street. The architectural style was a two-entry courtyard. The church was completed in 1923 and named "Shanzishi Church".

In 1945, there were 245 believers in Shanzishi Church, and by 1949, it had grown to 600 to 700.

During the Cultural Revolution (1966-1976), Shanzishi Church was forced to close and stop all worship activities. After China's reform and opening up in 1978, worship services were resumed. As the number of believers continued to increase, the church building space could hardly meet the needs of gatherings.

In 1998, Shanzishi Church was rebuilt on the original site and put into use in 2000. The new church had a construction area of 5,000 square meters and could accommodate more than 2,000 people worshipping at the same time. However, due to the unfinished ancillary projects of the church, the dedication ceremony was suspended.

In April 2017, the church started the basement and other legacy projects again and repaired and renovated buildings. It was completed seven months later, and on May 19, 2018, a grand dedication ceremony attended by nearly 4,000 people was held.

Shanzishi Church currently has about 3,500 believers. In addition to Sunday worships, there are Bible studies, prayer meetings, weddings, retreats, and many other activities. And the choir has visited sister churches in other places of the county, including Beijing and Shenzhen.

== Architecture ==
Shanzishi Church is located at No. 88 Zhangye Road, Chengguan District, Lanzhou City. It adopts the architectural style of a two-entry courtyard with a hall in the middle. With a construction area of about 5,000 square meters and a 6-story building, it is the largest church in Lanzhou and can accommodate more than 2,000 people worshiping at the same time.

The architecture of the church combines Chinese and Western styles, with Chinese flying horns and brackets, Western columns, arched-shaped windows, and a circular clock with a diameter of 1.5 meters. On top of the pointed roof is a red cross more than 4 meters high. The interior of the main hall is stepped and two-storied, similar to a grand theater. In addition, there are exquisite carving decorations.
