= American Reformed Mission =

American Protestant missionary society

American Reformed Mission was an American Protestant Christian missionary society of the Dutch Reformed Church (now the Reformed Church in America), that was involved in sending workers to countries such as China during the late Qing Dynasty.

== See also ==
- Protestant missionary societies in China during the 19th Century
- Timeline of Chinese history
- 19th-century Protestant missions in China
- List of Protestant missionaries in China
- Christianity in China
