= Anna Sofie Jakobsen =

Norwegian missionary to China

Anna Sofie Jakobsen (Chinese: 鄭安娜, Pinyin: Zhèng ānnà, 8 November 1860 in Kristiansand, Norway – 1913 in China), also named Anna Cheng, was a Norwegian missionary to China belonging to the Evangelical Lutheran Free Church and later with the China Inland Mission.

== Life ==
Jakobsen was a maid for a businessman named Christian Rasmussen, and in 1879 both of them established contact with the English China Inland Mission. Four years after, the Swedish-American evangelist and missionary friend Fredrik Franson came to the city and held meetings in Rasmussen's home. Anna Jakobsson was one of those who answered the call, and in 1884 she participated in the first evangelist course held by Franson in Christiania. Later that year she went to England, where she was accepted by the China Inland Mission. She sailed with Sophie Reuter to China on 18 November 1885 as one of the first Norwegian missionaries to china. She was placed in the province of Shanxi, where she worked at the county of Huozhou.

When Jakobsen announced her intention to marry a Chinese Christian evangelist, Cheng Xiuqi, there was subsequently a fierce campaign against her in the North-China Herald and she was forced to resign from the China Inland Mission. Such marriage were not then accepted by the missionary leadership and Western community. The couple then started an independent mission called "Anna Cheng's Mission" in Zezhou (泽州) (now Jincheng) in Shanxi Province. Jakobsen was very disappointed with the welcome her husband received by some Christians in Kristiansand when they were on vacation there in 1900. Their Mission nevertheless received financial support from Norway, which persisted even after Jakobsen's death.

== Memory ==
In the Autumn of 2010, a plaque was unveiled on the wall of Jakobsen's house in Kristiansand where both she and Sophie Reuter worked before they left for China.

== Sources ==
- Dehlin, Harald Stene. 1985. Pionerer i skjørt: høsten 1885 forlot de unge norske kvinnene Sofie Reuter og Anna Jakobsen London med Kina som reisemål, Oslo: Norsk Luthersk Forlag.
- Benson, Linda. Fall 2001. Muslims, Missionaries and Warlords in Northwestern China, Oakland University Journal. (pg. 14.)
