= Peter Torjesen =

Norwegian missionary to China

Peter Torjesen (Chinese: 叶永青) (28 November 1892 – 14 December 1939) was a Norwegian missionary to China with the China Inland Mission.

He was born in Kristiansand to parents who were devout Christians and he decided to devote his life to Jesus when he was twelve years old.

When he was 18, he heard the call to evangelize China. That day, he not only emptied his wallet into the collection plate, but included a small note with the words, "And my life."

After leaving school he studied at a business college, then took an office job for two years. In 1911 he travelled to the US to prepare to become a missionary, studying in Minnesota and then at the Moody Bible Institute before returning to Norway for military service. In 1918 he returned to the US and was ordained by the Evangelical Free Church in Brooklyn, New York. He then travelled to China where he took the Chinese name of Ye Yongqing, meaning “Leaf Evergreen”.

While in Norway, he had become engaged to Valborg, a trainee nurse. After completing her training, she studied at Bible school in Oslo and then at CIM in London. She then travelled to China and she and Peter were married on 17 January 1923 in Lan Xian. They went on to have four children.

During the Second Sino-Japanese War Peter and Valborg opened their home and church premises in Hequ, Shanxi, to shelter up to 1,000 refugees.

Torjesen died on 14 December 1939, the result of a Japanese bombing raid at Hequ, Shanxi. Valborg and the children spent 1941 to 1945 in a Japanese prison camp; after the war, they lived in the US for a time. Valborg returned to Norway and ran a CIM mission home, then went on to work in Taiwan and Minneapolis; she died in Norway on December 12, 1970.

== Legacy ==
Torjesen's family was informed by Hequ county officials in 1988 that Peter was on the county's list of "people's martyrs", and that the county wanted to erect a monument on the 50th anniversary of his death. The marble monument, with Peter's story engraved in gold characters, was unveiled in August 1990.

In 1993, Torjesen's grandson Finn moved to Taiyuan, Shanxi, as part of a group which set up the Evergreen organization, where Christian professionals from several countries work with local partners for economic and spiritual development.

== Bibliography ==
- Malcolm, Kari Torjesen. We Signed Away Our Lives: How One Family Gave Everything for the Gospel, ISBN 0-87808-780-X
