= Scottish United Presbyterian Mission =

Scottish United Presbyterian Mission was a Scottish Presbyterian missionary society that was involved in sending workers to countries such as China during the late Qing dynasty.

== Scottish United Presbyterian Mission work in China ==
The United Presbyterian Missionary Society of Scotland sent its agents to China in 1864. Work was commenced at Ningbo, and afterwards extended to Yantai, but these stations were left, and Manchuria become the special sphere of the Society. The Rev. Alexander Williamson, LL.D., was the patriarch of the Mission, having been in China since 1855, working in various departments. He devoted himself entirely to literary work, and prepared some books of Christian history and doctrine. The Revs. J. Ross and J. Mclntyre, who went out in 1872, were at the head of the two great centers of operation, Hai-chung and Moukden. A medical hospital was in operation in each of these places. Mr. Ross completed a translation of the New Testament into the Korean language. In 1890 there were seven missionaries employed, one lady agent, fourteen native helpers, and about eight hundred communicants reported.

== See also ==
- United Presbyterian Church of Scotland
- Protestant missionary societies in China during the 19th Century
- Timeline of Chinese history
- 19th-century Protestant missions in China
- List of Protestant missionaries in China
- Christianity in China
