= Francis James (missionary) =

Francis Huberty James or in Chinese: Xiu Yaochun 秀耀春 (born Francis James, 1851–1900) was a British Christian Missionary who went to China in 1876 as part of the China Inland Mission (CIM) founded by J. Hudson Taylor (1832–1905).

He was influential in the early translation of the Chinese Language, wrote many manuals on the teaching/learning for elementary students of the Chinese Language and became a University of Peking professor. He was killed during the Boxer Rebellion on 20 June 1900 and is considered a Christian martyr.

== Early years ==
Francis James was born in June 1851 in Upton, Berkshire. He was the third child of five born to John James (born about 1824 also in Upton, died 1897) and Sarah Mitten (born about 1818 in Robertsbridge, Sussex and died in 1889), who were married in 1847. He came from a long line of the James family all living at The Forge (Blacksmith) in the small village of Upton in Berkshire. His great-grandfather, Francis James born 1763, and his grandfather, Richard James born 1797, were both the village blacksmiths, but his father John started up the business of a grocers and bakery together with Francis’ brothers John, Joseph and Matthew. His sister, Martha, also worked in the new village store whilst her husband Richard Bellamy took over the job of blacksmith. In the early 1900s the store also became a post office in the hands of John. Francis followed suit and became a baker in the family business when was age 20. From his mother he inherited his sympathetic disposition, and from his father the tenacity of purpose and strength of will which were his chief characteristics. Little is known of his movement between 1871 and 1876 when he left England for China.

== Work in China and the United States ==
James was brought to China in 1876 by the China Inland Mission (CIM) to be a missionary. James and Joshua J. Turner were the first Protestant Christian missionaries in Shanxi and begin to help out victims of the disaster and famine. James worked in Honan and in the north of the country for the following two years. He became fluent in Chinese, and taught at a university. He and two companions set out in 1876 with over 4000 Gospels and other books, as well as religious tracts. They travelled 1,700 miles in three months. On their travels in 1877-78, they found widespread famine, which killed about one third of the population of one province. The accounts of the famine published by James and a few other missionaries brought famine relief from around the world. He resigned the CIM in 1881, along with many other young members. In 1878 he married a CIM member, Marie Huberty, a French speaking Belgian (born about 1846 in Liège, Belgium and died in Santa Cruz, California, United States, date unknown). She was a graduate of French Protestant School, Liege. He took her maiden name as his own middle name. After a return to England in 1881, James joined the English Baptist mission group in Shantung, China. James resigned the Baptist group in 1892. He became a Theist about 1894. He lived for several years in the United States, where in 1895 he was awarded the Lowell Lectureship in Boston, and lectured on the history, beliefs and philosophies of China. He returned to China in 1897, having taken the post of translator at the Imperial Arsenal, near Shanghai. This position he held for about a year, and he was then invited to join and accepted a place and was appointed a professor at the Imperial University in Peking. which appointment he held at the time of his death. He left his wife and children in the U.S. in 1893 to further the education of the children. They had two sons, Hubert Carey James, (born in Shanxi, China in 1879 and died 1953 in San Mateo, California), who became an accountant and Harold Francis James, (born in Berkshire, England in 1881 and died 1957 in Calhoun, Illinois) who studied at the Academié Julian in Paris with Jean Paul Laurens (1838–1921) a French painter and sculptor and Harold became an artist, an artistic author and a college teacher. Harold was profiled posthumously in "Who Was Who in American Art, 1564-1975" edited by Peter Hastings and published in 1999. He was also one of the artists included in "Biographical Directory of Kansas Artists Active Before 1945" compiled by Susan Craig and published in 2006.

In 1900, during the siege of Peking (the Boxer Rebellion), when many Christian churches and premises were burnt, and many native Christians were being killed, James secured refuge in Prince Su's palace, just across a canal from the besieged foreign legations, for about 3,000 endangered Chinese Christians. On 20 June 1900, James left the relative safety of the British legation, and was captured by Chinese soldiers. Some sources state that he was decapitated and his head was stuck on a spear for public viewing, by orders of General Ronglu (Jung Lu) (1836–1903), who was directing the siege of the foreign legations. Others state that he was shot. His killing was the second of an eminent foreigner following the declaration of war by the Chinese government, the first being Clemens von Ketteler, the German Minister. Thousands of Christians were killed in the uprising, including 182 Protestant missionaries. The term China Martyrs of 1900 was used by Protestant churches thereafter to describe the slayings.
