= August William Edwins =

August William Edwins (August 12, 1871 – July 2, 1942) was the American founder of the Augustana Evangelical Lutheran Church mission in the Xuchang, Henan, China.

== Early life ==
August William Edwins was born August 12, 1871, in Ogden, Boone Co., Iowa. His parents had emigrated from Sweden in 1868 to Swede Valley, Iowa. August was the fourth of eleven children. Due to poverty, at 16, he left home to earn money for his education. He graduated from Augustana Academy (Augustana College), Rock Island, Illinois, as valedictorian of both his college and his seminary classes. His gift as a scholar and affinity for linguistics became important for his missionary career. He graduated from Augustana Seminary in 1902 and was ordained that year at the Synod convention held in Ishpeming, Michigan. His first call was to serve the congregation at Trinity Lutheran Church, Stillwater, Minnesota.

It was while serving as a pastor at Trinity that Pastor Edwins was first approached about serving as a missionary in China. In 1904 the China Mission Society (CMS), a group of Augustana members interested in establishing mission work in China, called him to serve as its first missionary to China. He was hesitant, but in 1905, when no one responded to a call for volunteers for the China Mission Society (formed in 1901), Edwins himself volunteered and accepted the Society's call. After one year of language studies, Pastor Edwins, in the company of his Chinese teacher and two Norwegian Lutheran missionaries, set out in the spring of 1906 to explore the possibilities for a CMS field in the Honan province. It proved to be an arduous trip with attacks by angry crowds, military escorts, and revised routes of travel. Pastor and Mrs. Edwins set out for the new mission field in Hsuchang on September 2, 1906.

== Mission ==
Commissioned for China, Edwins married Alfreda Anderholm and sailed from Seattle, arriving in Shanghai in October 1905. After one year of language studies in the Fancheng district of Xiangfan, Hupeh (Hubei) Province, Pastor Edwins, in the company of his Chinese teacher and two Norwegian Lutheran missionaries, set out in the spring of 1906 to explore the possibilities for a CMS field in the Honan province. It proved to be an arduous trip with attacks by angry crowds, military escorts, and revised routes of travel. Pastor and Mrs. Edwins set out for the new mission field in Hsuchang on September 2, 1906. In consultation with missionaries of the China Inland Mission and others, Edwins was directed to an unoccupied field in central Honan. Moving to Hsu-ch'ang (Xuchang) in 1906, Edwins obtained a foothold in Loyang (Luoyang), Jiaxian, and other strategic centers, where land and property were purchased and groundwork was laid for future expansion. In 1910 the first nine converts were baptized in Xuchang. In addition, he was professor at the Union Theological Seminary in Shekow, near Hankou from 1922 to 1942. Pastor Edwins and the mission started a school in 1909 after requests from local people, but this school closed in 1911 due to inadequacies in the curriculum, faculty, and facilities. Another attempt to open a school occurred in 1913, but this school was discontinued after a year because Pastor Edwins was having to spend many days away from the school supervising building work at the other stations.

== Final years and death ==
Pastor Edwins' last twenty years in the mission field were spent teaching at the Union Theological Seminary at Hankow. Among other accomplishments, Edwins started a union language school for new missionaries, initiated a Chinese Lutheran church paper, promoted indigenous literature, and taught dogmatics in the Union Lutheran Theological Seminary near Wuhan, Hupeh (Hubei), while also serving as the schools President. In March 1941, due to an increasingly tense political situation in China, Pastor Edwins sent his wife and children home to the United States. After the Japanese attack on Pearl Harbor and the subsequent declaration of war on Japan by the United States, American citizens living in China were interned by the Japanese. Since Shekow, where the seminary was located, was in occupied territory, Pastor Edwins became one of those interned. He was interned by the Japanese shortly after Pearl Harbor. Pastor Edwins and others received word in April 1942 that an exchange of American and Japanese nationals was to take place. On June 5 Pastor Edwins and other internees boarded a Japanese steamer that took them to Shanghai. While in Shanghai, Pastor Edwins suffered a stroke and was placed in the China Inland Hospital. He stayed there until he was transferred to the ship that would take him home. The S.S. Conte Verde left Shanghai on June 29 and on July 2 Pastor Edwins died after suffering another stroke late in the evening. He was buried in the South China sea 160 miles due east of Hanoi on July 3 after a brief service attended by fellow missionaries.

== See also ==
- Lutheran Church of China
