= John Oswald Sanders =

New Zealand missionary and author (1902-1992)

John Oswald Sanders (October 17, 1902—October 24, 1992) was a general director of Overseas Missionary Fellowship (then known as China Inland Mission) in the 1950s and 1960s. He authored more than forty books on the Christian life. Sanders became an elder statesman and worldwide conference speaker from his retirement until his death.

== Biography ==
Sanders was born in Invercargill, New Zealand and gained a law degree in 1922. He attended the Bible Training Institute in Auckland and joined its staff in 1926. In 1931, he married Edith Mary Dobson.

Sanders left a promising law practice in his native New Zealand to serve as an instructor and administrator at the Bible College of New Zealand.

In 1954, he became general director of the China Inland Mission and led the reorganization of the CIM into the Overseas Missionary Fellowship. He was instrumental in beginning many new missions projects throughout East Asia. Upon his retirement in 1969, he continued to teach worldwide and to write prolifically, with many of his books being translated into German, Chinese, Korean, Spanish, and French, among other languages.

One of Sander's most notable works was Heresies Ancient and Modern, later published as Cults and Isms (1962). This work is notable for its criticism of Theosophy.

== Works ==
- 105 Days with John (1976)
- 31 Days on the Life of Christ (2001)
- A Spiritual Clinic (1958)
- A Sufficient Grace (2003)
- At Set of Sun (1993)
- Bible Men of Faith (1965)
- Cameos of Comfort (1973)
- Certainties of Christ's Second Coming (1982)
- Christ Incomparable (1952)
- Christ Indwelling and Enthroned (1938)
- Christ's Solitary Throne (1986)
- Consider Him (1976)
- Cultivation of Christian Character (1965)
- Cults and Isms (1962)
- Divine Art of Soul-Winning
- Dynamic Spiritual Leadership
- Effective Evangelism (1999)
- Effective Prayer (1961)
- Enjoying Growing Old (1981)
- Enjoying Intimacy With God (1980)
- Enjoying Your Best Years (1993)
- Every Life Is A Plan Of God (1992)
- Expanding Horizons (1971)
- Facing Loneliness (1988)
- For Believers Only (1976)
- From Kadesh to Canaan (n.d.)
- God's Purpose for Us
- God's Way of Victory, or New Covenant Victory (1950)
- Heaven: Better By Far (1994)
- Heresies Ancient and Modern (1948)
- How Lost Are the Heathen (1966)
- In Pursuit of Maturity (1986)
- Incomparable Christ: Person and Work of Jesus Christ (1952)
- Just Before Heaven (1994)
- Just the Same Today (1975)
- John the Baptist
- Light on Life's Problems (1944)
- Lonely But Not Alone (1991)
- Men from God's School (1965)
- Mighty Faith (1964)
- Moving Men Through God
- New Edition (1976)
- On to Maturity (1962)
- Overcoming Tension and Strain (1980)
- Paul the Leader (1983)
- People Just Like Us (1978)
- People You Should Know (1993)
- Planting Men in Melanesia (1978)
- Prayer Power Unlimited (1993)
- Problems of Christian Discipleship (1958)
- Promised Land Living (1984)
- Robust in Faith (1965)
- Satan No Myth (1975)
- Seen and Heard in China (1948)
- Sessions at the Pastor's Enrichment Congress (1985)
- Shoe-Leather Commitment: Guidelines for Disciples (1990)
- Some Modern Religions (1956)
- Spiritual Discipleship (1994)
- Spiritual Leadership (1967)
- Spiritual Lessons (1944)
- Spiritual Maturity (1962)
- The Best I can Be (1965)
- The Best We Can Be For God (1991)
- The Christian's Promised Land: Studies in Joshua (1984)
- The Divine Art of Soul-Winning (1937)
- The Holy Spirit and His Gifts (1970)
- This I Remember (autobiography) (1982)
- The Joy of Following Jesus (1994)
- The Menace of Mormonism (193?)
- The Missionary Call (n.d.)
- The Potter and Other Verses (1992)
- The Power of Unconscious Influence (1985)
- The Racket of Russellism (1933)
- The Strategic Place of Prayer (1983)
- The Subtlety of Seventh Day Adventism (n.d.)
- The World's Greatest Sermon: A Devotional Exposition of the Sermon on the Mount (1972)
- What of the Unevangelized? and Effective Evangelism: What Happens to Those Who Have Never Heard the Gospel (1966)
- When Victory Changed to Defeat (1950)
- World Prayer: Powerful Insights from Four of the World's Great Men of Prayer (1999)
- Your Thorn My Grace: The Resources of God (198?)

Religious titles
Preceded by Frank Houghton	Director of the China Inland Mission; 1954-1969	Succeeded by Michael C. Griffiths
