= Murders of John and Betty Stam =

1934 murders of Christian missionaries in China

John Cornelius Stam (January 18, 1907 – December 8, 1934) and Elisabeth Alden "Betty" Stam (née Scott; February 22, 1906 – December 8, 1934) were American Christian missionaries to China, with the China Inland Mission (CIM), during the Chinese Civil War. The missionary couple were executed by Communist Chinese soldiers in 1934.

== Early Lives ==
Betty Stam grew up in Tsingtao (today called Qingdao), a city on the east coast of China, where her father, Charles Scott, was a missionary. In 1926, Betty returned to the United States to attend college. While a student at Moody Bible Institute in Chicago she met John Stam, who was also a student at Moody. Betty returned to China in 1931. When John arrived in Shanghai in 1932, they unexpectedly met again. They married in 1933. In November 1934, John and Betty moved to their mission station at Tsingteh (now Jingde) in Anhui Province with their three-month-old daughter, Helen.

== Kidnapping and ransom demanded ==
On December 6, a messenger from the town's magistrate came to the Stams at 8:00 am and warned them that the Communists were approaching the city. At 9:30 am, they received a message that the Communists were within 4 miles (6 km) of the city. After John confirmed this, the Stams prepared to leave. However, the Communists quickly overran the city, came to where the Stams were staying and broke open the gates to the compound. They demanded all the money the Stams had and it was handed over. The Communists then arrested John and took him to the city prison. They left Betty, baby Helen, the maid and the cook in the Stams' house. Later that morning, the soldiers came back and took Betty and Helen. The maid and cook begged to go along, but the soldiers threatened they would be shot if they did. Betty and Helen were taken to be with John in the prison. That night, John Stam wrote a letter to CIM authorities, but it was never delivered. The letter was found later bundled up in some of Helen's clothes. It stated that the Stams were being held by the Communists for a ransom of $20,000. John Stam also wrote to the mission authorities of how he and his wife had been captured, then wrote, "Philippians 1:20: 'May Christ be glorified whether by life or death.'"

John, Betty and Helen were then taken to the local prison where some of the prisoners were released to make room for the Stams. In the midst of hustle and bustle, Helen started crying, and a soldier suggested that they kill her, since she was only bothering them. Then one of the prisoners who had just been released asked why they should kill the innocent baby. The soldiers turned to him and asked if he was willing to die for the foreign baby. The man was hacked to pieces in front of the Stams. Helen was allowed to live.

== Martyrdom at Miaoshou ==
The next morning, the Stams were forced to march 12 miles (19 km) west with the soldiers, to the town of Miaoshou (which is just under 9 miles (14 km) due west of Jingde).

Miaoshou [25 miles Northeast of Mount Huangshan]
- Location within China
- Coordinates: 30.29748809920154°N 118.4012536574288°E

The group stopped for a night and Betty was allowed to tend to Helen, but in fact, she hid her daughter in the room inside a sleeping bag. The next morning, John and Betty were marched down the streets of Miaoshou to be executed. Curious onlookers lined both sides of the streets. A Chinese shopkeeper stepped out of the crowd and talked to the Communists, trying to persuade them not to kill the Stams. The soldiers ordered the man back into the crowd, but he wouldn't step back. The soldiers then invaded his house where they found a Chinese copy of the Bible and a hymnbook. He was led alongside the Stams to be executed for being a Christian. After marching for a short while longer, John Stam was ordered to kneel, and was beheaded. His wife and the shopkeeper were killed moments later.

== Rescue of baby Helen, and aftermath ==
The baby, Helen, was found two days later by a Chinese pastor who took her home and took care of her. The Reverend Lo Ke-chou and his wife then took the baby girl to her maternal grandparents, the Reverend Charles Ernest Scott and his wife, Clara, who were also missionaries in China. The Stams' daughter later came to the United States and was raised by her aunt and uncle, George and Helen Mahy.

John and Betty Stam's bodies were found by a small group of Christians, and they buried them on a hillside. The Stams' gravestones read:

John Cornelius Stam, January 18, 1907, "That Christ may be glorified whether by life or by death." Philippians 1:20

Elisabeth Scott Stam, February 22, 1906, "For me to live is Christ and to die is gain." Philippians 1:21

December 8, 1934, Miaosheo, Anhui, "Be thou faithful unto death and I will give thee a crown of life." Revelation 2:10

The story of their martyrdom was widely publicized and inspired many to become missionaries.

== Red Army unit responsible for the deaths ==
At the time of the murders, the area was controlled by the Kuomintang-led Nationalist Government. The Nationalist forces were prevailing in the Chinese Civil War, and the forces of the Chinese Workers' and Peasants' Red Army (Red Army) had started their Long March. The Red Army's 19th Division, under commander Xun Huaizhou and political commissar Nie Hongjun, passed through the town of Tsingteh on December 6, 1934, where they captured the Stams. They forced the Stams to march with them, until the executions on December 8.

After the executions, the 19th Division turned south to join a main Red Army force—the 10th Army Group. The 10th Army Group was defeated on December 14 by a brigade from the Nationalist force, and commander Xun was killed in that battle. A few weeks later, on January 27, 1935, the entire 10th Army Group was annihilated by Nationalist forces. Of the officers responsible for the Stam murders, only political commissar Nie survived.

== See also ==
- Historical Bibliography of the China Inland Mission
- List of China Inland Mission missionaries in China
