= Archibald Edward Glover =

Archibald Edward Glover (1859–1954) was a British Protestant Christian missionary in China. He served with the China Inland Mission from 1896 to 1900, when he returned to England with his two children after his wife and youngest daughter died during their flight from the Boxer Rebellion.

His memoir A Thousand Miles of Miracle in China was published in 1904 and was widely read in the United States. It went through 22 printings and, according to Andrew T. Kaiser, "colored and even defined the Boxer events for generations of Western readers."

== Bibliography ==
- Archibald E. Glover (1904). A Thousand Miles of Miracle in China.
- Pat Barr, To China with Love: The Lives and Times of Protestant Missionaries in China, 1860-1900 (1972)
- A. J. Broomhall, Hudson Taylor and China's Open Century, vol. 7 (1989)
- Marshall Broomhall (1901). Martyred Missionaries of the China Inland Mission: With a Record of the Perils & Sufferings of Some who Escaped. Morgan & Scott.
- Norman H. Cliff, "Archibald Edward Glover" in Biographical Dictionary of Missions
- See also the CIM periodical China's Millions for the years 1900–1904.
