= Leslie Theodore Lyall =

British Protestant missionary

Leslie Theodore Lyall (14 November 1905, Chester, England – 14 February 1996, Tunbridge Wells, England) was a British Protestant Christian missionary in China. He also authored several books about China. He served with the China Inland Mission.

Lyall was born in Chester, England, the son of an itinerant evangelist, James Lyall, who died when Leslie was five years old. Educated at Emmanuel College, Cambridge, Lyall was a leader of the Cambridge Inter-Collegiate Christian Union in the period that the Inter-Varsity Fellowship of Evangelical Unions was coming into being.

== Bibliography ==
- Leslie Lyall, John Sung (1954, ret 1961), Come Wind, Come Weather: The Present Experience of the Church in China (1961)
- The Church Local and Universal (1962)
- Urgent Harvest (1962)
- A Passion for the Impossible: The Continuing Story of the Mission Hudson Taylor Began (1965, ret 1976)
- Red Sky at Night (1969)
- A World to Win (1972)
- Three of China's Mighty Men (1973)
- New Spring in China: A Christian Appraisal (1979)

== Sources ==
- Obituaries: The Independent, 24 February 1996; Daily Telegraph, 19 February 1996; The Guardian, 16 February 1996
- Douglas Johnson, Contending for the Faith: A History of the Evangelical Movement in the Universities and Colleges (1979)

== See also ==
- List of China Inland Mission missionaries in China
