= Frida Lundell =

Swedish missionary

Frida Lundell (6 March 1899 – 19 August 1934) was a Swedish missionary. She served with the Swedish Missionary Society in Chinese Turkestan (present day Xinjiang).

Lundell was born in Valö in Uppland, Sweden. She worked as a nurse midwife in Yarkand for around 7 years in periods during the years 1925 to 1934. She died in Yarkand 1934 of typhoid at the age of 35.
