= Rikard Nyström =

Swedish missionary

Rikard Nyström (1884–1943) was a Swedish missionary. He served with the Mission Union of Sweden in Chinese Turkestan (present day Xinjiang).

== Bibliography ==
- Notes about the Tungan people, 1937
- The unrest in Eastern Turkestan, 1935
