= Sigfrid Persson-Moen =

Swedish missionary

Sigfrid Persson-Moen was a Swedish missionary for the Mission Covenant Church of Sweden in Xinjiang, China, between 1925 and 1938. His pictures and writings are one of the main sources of information about the Swedish Mission in China.

He was a skilled photographer and took many pictures during his time in Xinjiang, pictures that are archived in the National Archives of Sweden (Riksarkivet). He was also very familiar with the Uyghur language, and wrote down and translated many Uyghur poems and stories. These were later published in "The Moen collection of eastern Turki (New Uighur) popular poetry".
