= Mary Margaret Moninger =

American missionary (1892-1950)

- Born: September 23, 1892; Iowa
- Died: March 21, 1950 (aged 57); Marshalltown, Iowa
- Education: Grinnell College
- Occupation: Presbyterian missionary

Mary Margaret Moninger (1892–1950) was an American missionary.

Moninger was born near Marshalltown, Iowa on September 23, 1892. As an undergraduate was a member of the Student Volunteer Movement for Foreign Missions. She received her Masters degree from Grinnell College in 1922.

In 1915 Moninger began her missionary work in China under the auspices of the Presbyterian Board of Foreign Missions. She served the Hainan province as a girls’ schools teacher and administrator in various locations for over twenty years. She also collected botanical specimens which she sent back to the United States and the Philippines.

In 1937, during the Second Sino-Japanese War, the Hainan province was invaded by the Japanese. Movement by Moninger and her fellow missionaries was severely restricted and at times she was held under house arrest. In 1942 Moninger was sent back to the United States as part of an exchange of noncombatants. She wrote about her experience in an essay entitled Internment and Repatriation from the United States View. She settled back in Iowa.

Moninger died on March 21, 1950 in Marshalltown, Iowa.
