= Cecil Frederick Robertson =

English baptist missionary (1884– 1913)

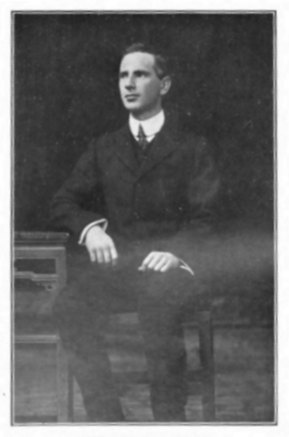
- Born: 9 April 1884; Clapham, England
- Died: 6 March 1913 (aged 28); Xi'an, China
- Education: Regent's Park College; Middlesex Hospital Medical School; University of London

Cecil Frederick Robertson FRCS (9 April 1884 – 16 March 1913) was an English Baptist missionary and a fellow of the Royal College of Surgeons of England who helped operate the Sianfu (Xi'an) Hospital, later renamed the Jenkins–Robertson Memorial Hospital, in the Shaanxi Province of China. Robertson was best known for his treatment of civilians and rebel soldiers in the 1911 Revolution, as well as his aid in the establishment of a Red Cross league and a hospital for disabled soldiers in Shaanxi.

== Background and education ==
=== Early life ===
Robertson was raised in a religious household. During his childhood, Robertson's parents had hoped that at least one of their three children would become a missionary. In 1897, at the age of thirteen, he and his brother decided to devote themselves to Christianity at Christ Church under the ministry of F. B. Meyer.

As a child, Robertson was described as "a bright and happy boy" with a "distinguished career that lay before him". He was enrolled in the Mercers' School in September 1895, where he was elected a Foundation Scholar in 1897. In 1898, he passed the Junior Cambridge Local.

=== Higher education ===
Robertson began attending the University of London in 1900 and left in 1901 after passing its Preliminary Scientific (M.B.) Examination. In September 1901, Robertson entered the Middlesex Hospital Medical School, where he was a Brodrip Scholar and Prizeman. That same year he began studying theology at the Regent's Park College. In 1907 he passed the Middlesex Hospital Medical School's medical examination and became MRCS. Following his graduation, Robertson began working as a house surgeon under Sir Alfred Pearce Gould at the University of London and became FRCS in June 1909.

== Personal life ==
Robertson was the third child of his mother and father, who worked as a bank manager. He had one brother and one sister, Grace, who married the Presbyterian Reverend A. E. Hubbard. Robertson himself did not marry.

== Missionary work ==
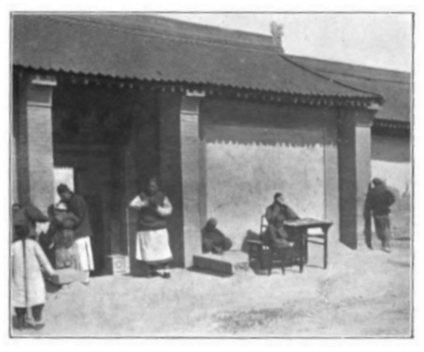
Sianfu Hospital, later renamed the Jenkins–Robertson Memorial Hospital

In addition to studying theology and medicine, Robertson prepared for his missionary career by studying Chinese at King's College London. He was adopted by the Baptist churches of East London, who would support his missionary work. On 12 October 1909, he set sail aboard the Prince Ludwig, beginning his journey to Xi'an, China.

=== Early work at Sianfu Hospital ===
Robertson arrived in Xi'an in December 1909 and began working with Dr. Herbert Stanley Jenkins, Dr. Andrew and Dr. Charlotte Young, Dr. Russell and Mrs. J. Watson, and Reverend A. G. and Maud Shorrock. During his first year in China, Robertson primarily studied Chinese and looked after the local boys' school. He saw outpatients at the Sianfu Hospital once a week and looked after recovering opium patients.

=== Experience at Yan'an ===
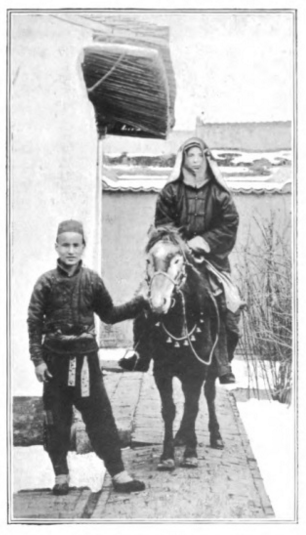
Cecil Frederick Robertson (right) travelling to Yan'an, China from Xi'an

Robertson left Xi'an for Yan'an in northern Shaanxi in February 1911. At Yan'an, he underwent six weeks of medical training that prepared him for the remainder of his career as a medical missionary. A Baptist Missionary Society station had been founded there the previous year by Rev. and Mrs. Watson, but it had no doctor. Opium addiction was particularly prevalent in northern Shaanxi and thus became a priority for treatment. Upon his arrival, Robertson arranged for an opium refuge to be set up in the back of a church for those seeking recovery from addiction. He additionally took over the small dispensary at Yan'an and visited patients in their homes.

While at Yan'an, Robertson earned the praise and recognition of local government officials, including the head mandarin of the prefecture, the prefect, the county magistrate, and the head military mandarin. His relationships with local officials in Yan'an prepared him for future interactions with other officials during his missionary career.

=== 1911 revolution ===
In May 1911, Dr. Jenkins went home on furlough, leaving Robertson to take charge of the Sianfu Hospital. In September that year, the missionary received reports of the 1911 Chinese Revolution beginning. The revolution reached Shaanxi on 22 October, leaving approximately 15,000 Manchus dead in Xi'an. While several missionaries left Shaanxi during this period, Robertson insisted on staying and helping the wounded. He organised ambulances and treated wounded soldiers both on the battlefield and in the hospital. During the months of the revolution an estimated 2,000–3,000 patients passed through the Sianfu Hospital, which was run by only two doctors with the aid of the local Chinese Red Cross Society.

The Qing emperor Puyi abdicated the throne in February 1912, and the fighting in Xi'an ended soon after.

=== Work following the revolution ===
In April 1912, the other doctor at the Sianfu Hospital, Dr. Young, fell ill with appendicitis. Robertson operated on Young and saw to his recovery while running the hospital himself. In June, Robertson began working with the provincial governor to establish an institute for disabled soldiers, which was later founded as the Pity the Wounded Hospital.

== Death ==
On 11 February 1913, Robertson received a message from a missionary in the province of Gansu requesting travel aid to bring his two-year-old son to Robertson for smallpox treatment. Robertson made the four days' journey to Gansu himself immediately and arrived in two days. He treated the child, who did not have smallpox, and returned in three days' time. Upon his return he wrote to his mother that the journey had "shown me that I am far fitter than I thought I was." However, somewhere along that journey, Robertson contracted typhus. On 5 March, he was confined to bed rest with a fever of 104 degrees. On the morning of 6 March, he entered a coma; Robertson died later that day.

== Legacy ==
Beyond his work at the Sianfu Hospital, Robertson made significant contributions to Xi'an during his service, including the establishment of an institute for disabled soldiers, the Pity the Wounded Hospital. He was also credited with the success and training of the newly founded Red Cross league in Shaanxi during and after the 1911 Revolution.

Robertson was well-respected by local authorities of both the imperial and republican governments. Upon his death, he was given the distinction of a funeral with full military honours by the provincial military governor. After he and Dr. Jenkins had died, the Sianfu Hospital was renamed the Jenkins–Robertson Memorial Hospital in their honour.
