= Gustaf Adolf Arell =

- Missionary to East Turkestan
- Born: 26 May 1886; Eneboga, Lilla Malma Parish, Södermanland, Sweden
- Died: Unknown
- Spouse: Johanna (Hanna) Katarina Arell nee Larsson

Gustaf Adolf Arell (26 May 1886 – ??) was a Swedish missionary and linguist. He served with the Mission Union of Sweden in Chinese Turkestan (present day Xinjiang).

On 16 October 1915 he married Johanna Katarina Arell.

== Bibliography ==
- J. Lundahl (editor), På obanade stigar: Tjugofem år i Ost-Turkestan. Stockholm, Svenska Missionsförbundet Förlag, 1917
