= William Taylor Dixon =

American independent faith missionary to China

William Taylor Dixon (1879-1959) was an independent faith missionary to China and minister in the United States.

== Early life ==
He was born in Snow Camp, North Carolina, to Quaker parents Milo and Rosa Dixon on June 23, 1879. He married educator Bertha Teresa Pinkham, daughter of Evangelical Friends leader William Penn Pinkham and Emma Cecilia Curry on June 23, 1904. Bertha was principal of the Training School for Christian Workers in Los Angeles, California, which later became Azusa Pacific University located in Azusa, California.

== Missionary work in China ==
Influenced by early 20th century missionary movements, the Dixons left for China in 1909 with their two young children, Wendell and Gertrude. They were assisted in part by China Inland Mission's Cecil Pohill, one of the Cambridge Seven missionaries to China

Bertha Pinkham Dixon later published her memoirs, A Romance of Faith, which included their experiences in China. Her narrative recorded their arrivals in Shanghai and Hong Kong where they were associated with early Pentecostal missionaries Alfred and Lillian Garr, Robert and Aimee Semple (later evangelist Aimee Semple McPherson), and Chinese pastor Mok Lai Chi, who later pioneered an indigenous Christian movement.

In 1910 the Dixons transferred to Guangzhou (Canton). Guangzhou was the center of rising Chinese revolution at that time and civil unrest prevailed. Disease outbreaks occurred of which the two Dixon children died in 1911. They were buried in homemade coffins outside the city in a Chinese Christian burial ground.

== Missionary work in the United States ==
The Dixons returned to San Francisco in 1912 following a ministry in Zhaoqing (Shiu Hing), serving with the Edmund J. Clinton family whose son Clifford Clinton later founded the Clifton's Cafeterias and Meals for Millions. Although the Dixon's time in China was shortened, they and their co-workers left behind a continuing work in China

During their remaining years, the Dixons served churches in Snow Camp, North Carolina, and San Jose, Santa Ana, Gilroy, Morgan Hill, Santa Rosa, Redlands, and Los Angeles, California. Among these pastorates was the Pisgah Home after the death of founder Finis Yoakum.

== Death ==
Bertha Dixon died in 1947, followed by William Dixon in 1959. They were survived by five children and eight grandchildren. ˜˜˜˜
