= Sally Wolfe =

Christian medial missionary (1885–1975)

- Born: 25 December 1885; Ireland
- Died: 15 July 1975 (aged 89); Cork, Ireland
- Known for: Medical missionary work

Sarah "Sally" Christine Wolfe (25 December 1885 – 15 July 1975) was a medical missionary who served in China from 1915 to 1951. She came from a devout Methodist family and upon leaving Ireland, became part of the Methodist Missionary Society. When she arrived in China, Wolfe joined the Jubilee Women's hospital at the English Wesleyan Mission in Hankou, where she worked among other European missionaries and ran Bible classes for women and children.

Wolfe's time in China was marked by much political strife, as she arrived four years after the 1911 Revolution and witnessed the Chinese Civil War, which began in 1927. In 1951, after serving her mission for nearly forty years, Sally Wolfe left China due to strong xenophobia towards foreign missionaries and conflict between Communists and the Kuomintang (Chinese Nationalist Party).

== Early life and education ==
Sally Wolfe was born on Christmas Day, 1885 to John Joseph and Marion Wolfe in Ireland. She was the second child and eldest daughter among her five siblings. During her early childhood, Wolfe's family moved from their home to The Grove, a house on the outskirts of Skibbereen (County Cork, Ireland) that once belonged to her maternal grandmother. There, the Wolfes lived a relatively comfortable life and had close ties with the Methodist Church, as John Joseph and Marion were both raised in heavily Methodist families.

As a child, Wolfe attended the Ladies’ School in Skibbereen and later attended Mr. Storey's Intermediate School. After entering and graduating from Alexandra College in Dublin, Ireland, Wolfe attended University College Cork in 1908 to study medicine with the intention of becoming a medical missionary. While she was there, she was honored for her academic achievements, as she earned the titles of First Exhibitioner in Science (1907-1908) and Second Year Exhibitioner (1909) and was honored with fourth and fifth year scholarships of £28 and £30, respectively. Wolfe graduated from Cork University in 1913 and subsequently began working at the Royal Samaritan Hospital in Glasgow, Scotland. There, she was appointed resident house surgeon in 1913 and ultimately, in June 1913, was promoted to a paid position under a surgeon named Dr. A.W. Russell.

Due to differences and dissatisfaction with the Royal Samaritan Hospital and Dr. Russell in particular, Wolfe resigned from her position at the hospital on 30 November 1913.

== Work in China ==
Around April 1915, Wolfe moved to China in response to what she believed was God's calling for her to become a medical missionary. In concordance with a promise she made her father, she waited until she was thirty before leaving for China. Upon arriving in the country, Wolfe worked in Jubilee Women's Hospital (affiliated with the English Wesleyan Mission) in Hankou. There, she worked with other European women as well as Chinese nurses and treated conditions such as lockjaw, cholera, malnutrition, while also serving as an obstetrician and surgeon. In addition to working in the hospital, Wolfe made house calls throughout the Chinese countryside in order to unbind young girls’ feet, as foot binding was considered a sign of beauty and necessary for marriage.

In addition to working at Jubilee Women's Hospital, Wolfe also spent time in Zhongxiang, where she worked in an outpatient department around 1931; she also worked in Hway Chin Tiang, where she helped provide medical care for destitute women and children and in 1937, worked at Methodist General Hospital in Zhongxiang.

While as a medical missionary in China, Wolfe intermittently took four furloughs, which took place in 1921–1922, 1927, 1934–1935, and 1941.

During her time in China, Wolfe was highly regarded by her Chinese colleagues, who presented her with scrolls reading "’She healed the entire globe and jewels are made more precious by her virtue,’" and "’Her name is known throughout China and foreign countries and her virtue enriches gold."’ (Wright 120)

In his book entitled, China, My China, Harold B. Rattenbury also lauds Wolfe, as he recalls seeing her in the Women’s Hospital across the street from his Hankou home. Rattenbury praises her work ethic, saying, "When or how that doctor slept I never could discover. She seemed to be on call at all hours of the day and night…" (120) Rattenbury also speaks highly of Wolfe's character, calling her "brilliant, sincere, straight, and childlike," while depicting her as a heroic presence in China and emphasizing her love and understanding of the Chinese people.

Ultimately, Wolfe applied for an exit permit and left China in 1951 after deciding that her presence was doing more harm than good; she and other foreign missionaries collectively felt that their affiliation with the Chinese Christians placed the Chinese Church in Communist disfavor, and therefore, danger.

=== Political context ===
During her time in China, Wolfe witnessed significant political turmoil, as she arrived four years after the 1911 Revolution. Also known as the Xinhai Revolution, the event resulted in the overthrow of the Qing dynasty by revolutionaries and the subsequent establishment of the Republic of China.

Because of the political disorder in China, Wolfe at times lived in significant danger. During Wolfe's stay in Cheungsiang in 1931, one of Chiang Kai-shek’s armies attacked the region and killed several of Wolfe's colleagues. During the same instance, a red soldier searched the home in which Wolfe was a guest, but failed to see her. The day after Wolfe left the residence, the house was searched thoroughly.

In another instance, Wolfe was brought before a firing squad, presumably of the Communist Party. According to Wolfe, a member of the squad saved her life by coming forward and saying that she had once cared for him and therefore, should not die.

Overall, Wolfe stayed in China throughout four stages of conflict, as she witnessed the control of China by various warlords during the Warlord Era, war between the Communists and Kuomintang, a combined effort by the Communists and Kuomintang against Japan during World War II, and resumed civil war between the Communists and Kuomintang after World War II.

=== Adopting children ===
While in China, Wolfe adopted three Chinese children. Suteh, Wolfe's oldest daughter, was adopted around early January 1925 after Suteh's biological mother and leader in Wolfe's Bible group died after childbirth. Shortly after adopting Suteh, Wolfe adopted a second child, a boy named Johan, whose biological mother, also a Bible woman, died during childbirth. About three years after adopting Johan, Wolfe adopted her third child, a daughter named Futeh, whose biological parents deserted her.

After Wolfe's departure from China in 1951, she never heard from or about her children again, as the Communists in power stopped letters from being sent to the West.

=== Religious work ===
While working as a medical missionary, Wolfe remained grounded in her Methodist beliefs and led a Bible group in Hankou, a weekly prayer meeting, and taught Sunday school in Hway Chin Tiang.

== Post-China life ==
After leaving China in 1951, Wolfe spent a year in Dublin in the home of Betty, her eldest niece. When Betty's family moved to Kenya, Wolfe moved to and stayed in Canada until 1957. While in Canada, she worked along the Alberta-Saskatchewan border at Cold Lake Hospital for a summer and occasionally helped run Hollandia House, a nursing home in Elk Point, Alberta. While at her youngest brother Tom's house in Elk Point, Wolfe fell and broke her hip; after a young surgeon erred in the setting of Wolfe's hip, she was left with limited function in one her legs.

In 1975, Wolfe left Canada and returned to Cork, as she reportedly wished to die in her native land. After living in a flat next to her sister Fan and subsequently living with her cousin Marie Kingston, Wolfe eventually moved into St. Luke's Home in Cork. There, Wolfe fell, broke her hip again, and consequently, became bedridden.

Wolfe died on 15 July 1975, at the age of ninety.
