= Lyman Burt Peet =

American missionary to China (1809–1878)

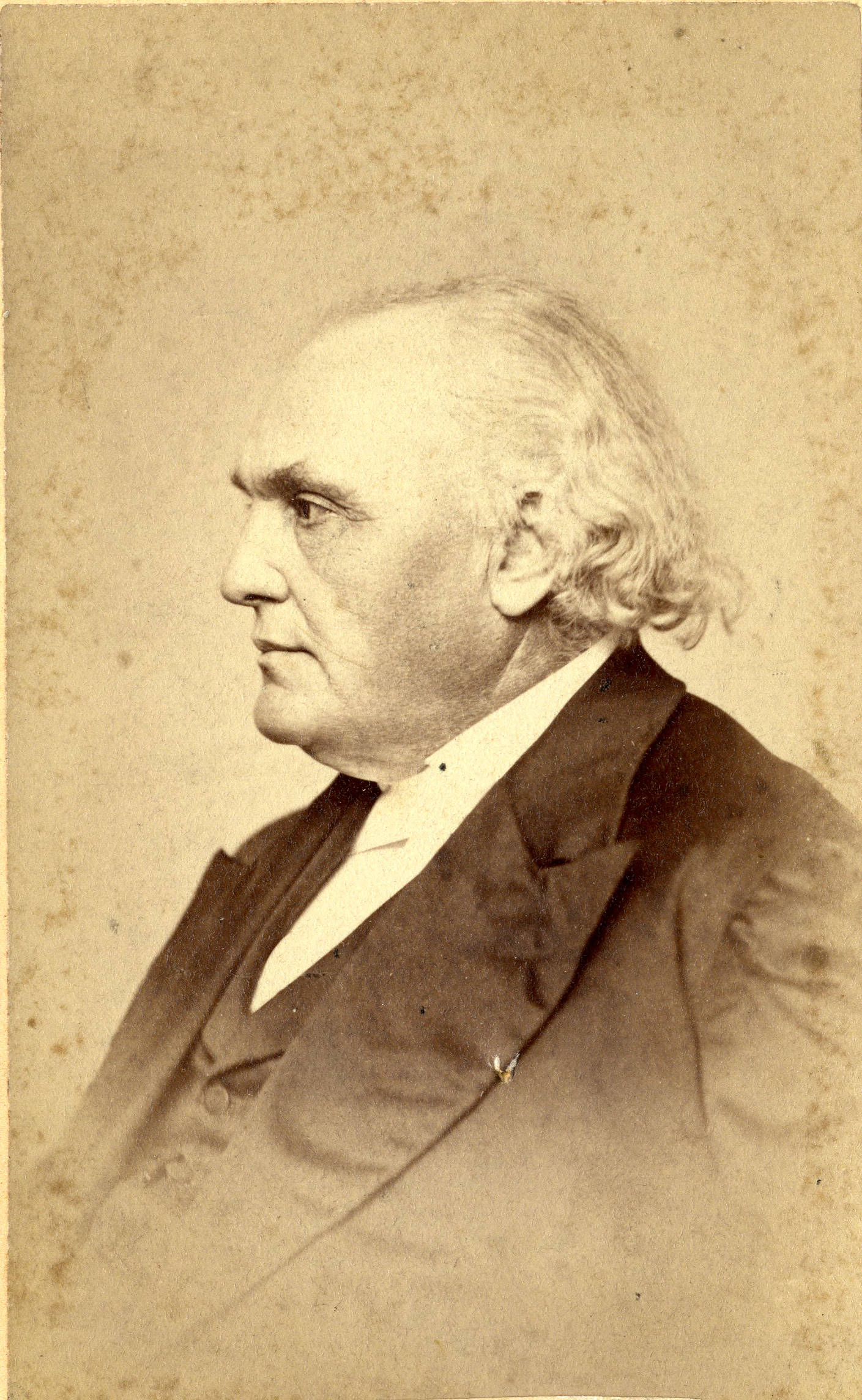
- Missionary to China
- Born: March 1, 1809; Cornwall, Vermont
- Died: January 11, 1878 (aged 68); West Haven, Connecticut

Lyman Burt Peet (March 1, 1809 – January 11, 1878; Chinese: 弼利民 or 弼來滿; Pinyin: Bì Lìmín or Bì Láimǎn; Foochow Romanized: Bĭk Lé-mìng or Bĭk Lài-muāng) was one of the first Congregationalist missionaries to Fuzhou, China.

== Life ==
Lyman Burt Peet was born on March 1, 1809, in Cornwall, Vermont to Lemuel and Roxalany (Stebbins) Peet. He graduated from Middlebury College in 1834. He then studied at Andover Theological Seminary and graduated in 1837. On December 13, 1837, he was ordained in South Dennis, Massachusetts, and sailed as a missionary of the A.B.C.F.M. for Siam on July 6, 1839. In August 1846 he was transferred to Fuzhou and reached there in September 1847. Peet retired in 1871, and resided in West Haven, Connecticut until he died of dysentery on January 11, 1878.

== Family ==
Peet married twice. In 1839 he married his first wife, Rebecca Clemence Sherrill, who died in Fuzhou in 1856. On June 6, 1858, he married Hannah Louisa Plimpton, who, after Peet's death, married to another ABCFM missionary in Fuzhou, Charles Hartwell. Peet and Hannah had a daughter named Ellen; she married Rev. George Hubbard and they served together as missionaries in Foochow. Peet also had two sons, Lyman Jr (a missionary in Foochow) and Edward (a doctor).

== Publications ==
During his years in Fuzhou, he helped translate several portions of the Bible including the Book of Psalms, the Proverbs, and the Book of Job into the local Fuzhou dialect.

His papers are held at Yale Divinity Library.
