= Hilda Lovisa Nordquist =

- Missionary to East Turkestan
- Born: 6 April 1881; Norunga Parish, Älvsborg County
- Died: 16 October 1935 (aged 54); Moscow, Russia

Hilda Lovisa Nordquist (6 April 1881–16 October 1935) was a Swedish missionary. She served with the Mission Union of Sweden in Chinese Turkestan (present day Xinjiang).

Nordquist was a qualified nurse; however the MUS saw evangelism and preaching as a priority and wished her to focus on spiritual work.

== Bibliography ==
- J. Lundahl (editor), På obanade stigar: Tjugofem år i Ost-Turkestan (Stockholm, Svenska Missionsförbundet Förlag, 1917) Swedish
