= OMF International =

International Christian missionary organization

- Founded: 25 June 1865
- Founder: Hudson Taylor
- Type: Evangelical Missions Agency
- Purpose: Unreached People Groups, discipleship, church planting
- Headquarters: Shanghai (formerly) Singapore (1950s-Present)
- Location: East Asia
- Origins: China Inland Mission (till 1964)
- Region served: East Asia & East Asians globally
- Key people: Hudson Taylor, DE Hoste, JO Fraser, A.J. Broomhall, Patrick Fung, Cambridge Seven,
- Website: https://omf.org
- Formerly called: China Inland Mission

OMF International (formerly Overseas Missionary Fellowship and before 1964 the China Inland Mission) is an international and interdenominational Evangelical Christian missionary society with an international centre in Singapore. It was founded in Britain by Hudson Taylor on 25 June 1865.

== Overview ==
The non-sectarian China Inland Mission was founded on theologically conservative principles by James Hudson Taylor in 1865. From the beginning it recruited missionaries from the working class as well as single women. The original goal of the mission that began dedicated to China has grown to include bringing the Gospel to East Asia. Following the departure of all foreign workers in the early 1950s, the China Inland Mission redirected its missionaries to other parts of East Asia. The name was changed to the Overseas Missionary Fellowship in 1964, and then to the current name in the 1990s.

== History ==
=== Missiological Distinctives of the CIM ===
1. Priority is given to unreached inland provinces while seeking to evangelize the whole of China.

2. No solicitation of finance, or indebtedness; looking to God alone; pooling support in life of corporate faith
3. Identification with Chinese by wearing Chinese dress and queue (pigtail), worshipping in Chinese houses
4. Indigenization through training Chinese co-workers in self-governing, self-supporting and self-propagating principles
5. Recruitment of missionaries not based on education or ecclesiastical ordination, but spiritual qualification; deployment of single women in the interior and Christian professionals
6. Interdenominational-International Membership

7. Headquarters on the field, director rule; leaders and workers serving shoulder to shoulder

—

"We wish to see churches and Christian Chinese presided over by pastors and officers of their own countrymen, worshipping the true God in the land of their fathers, in the costume of their fathers, in their own tongue wherein they were born, and in edifices of a thoroughly Chinese style of architecture."

— J. Hudson Taylor,

=== Origins ===
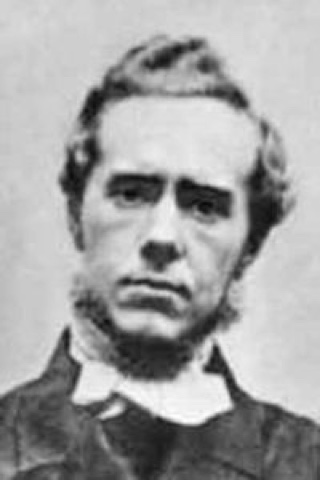
Hudson Taylor c. 1865

Hudson Taylor made the first decision to found the China Inland Mission at Brighton, England during his first furlough from China. Like his missionary forebear Karl Gützlaff and contemporary William Chalmers Burns, Taylor was convinced that Chinese clothing should be worn when engaged in missionary work in inland China. On 3 October 1865, Taylor sent John and Anne Stevenson and George Stott to China, where they arrived on February 6, 1866. Including the five missionaries previously sent to Ningbo -James Joseph Meadows, Jean Notman, Stephen Paul Barchet, and George and Anne Crombie, these eight were already in China when Taylor returned in 1866. On 26 May of that year, Taylor accompanied the largest group of missionaries that had ever sailed to China on the Lammermuir. There were 16 missionaries as well as Hudson, his wife, Maria and their 4 children that became known as the Lammermuir Party. This journey took 4 months.

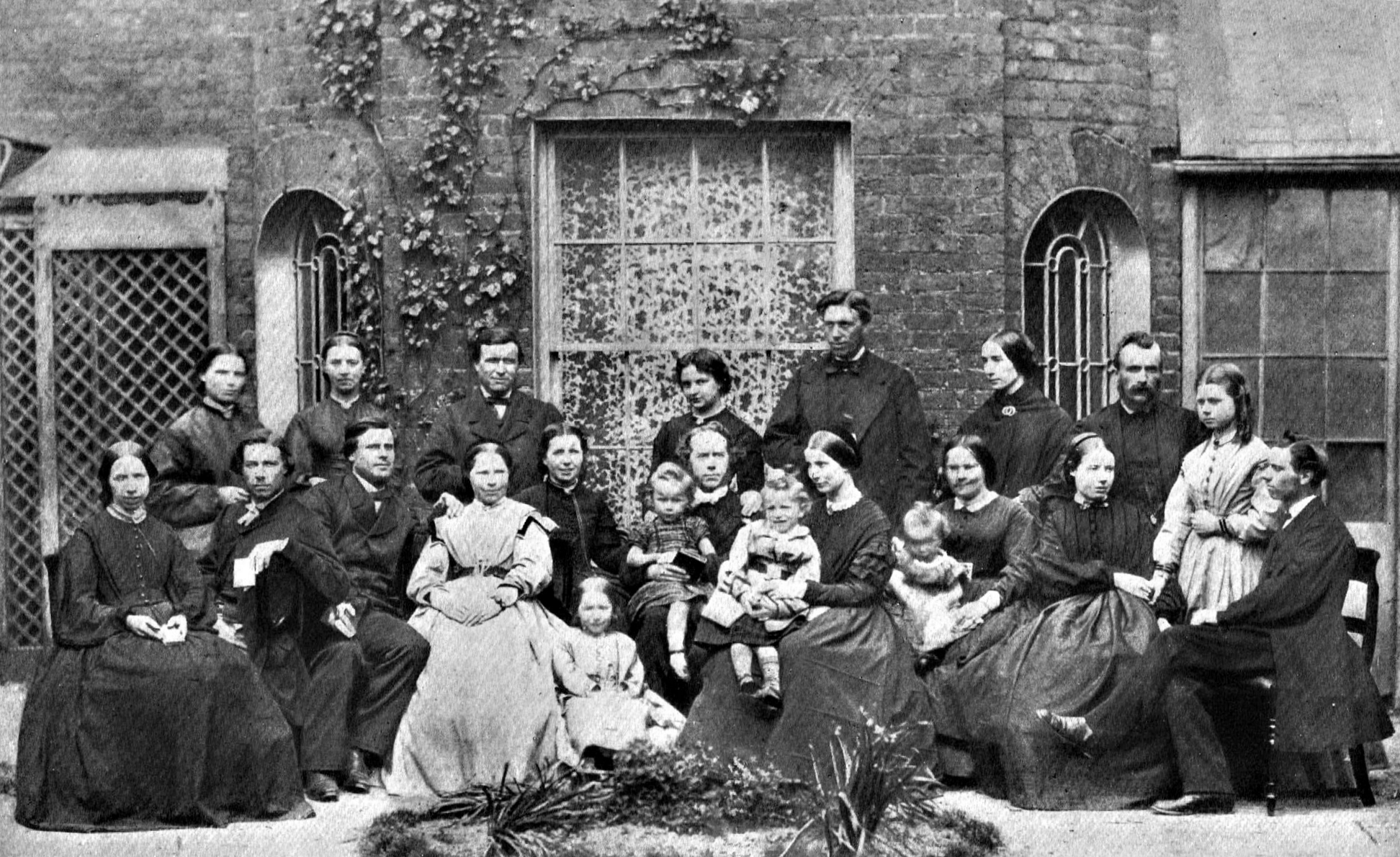
The Lammermuir Party sailed on 26 May 1866.

=== Inland pioneering ===
In 1872, the China Inland Mission's London council was formed. In 1875, it began to evangelise China systematically. Taylor requested 18 missionaries from God for the nine provinces which were still unreached. In 1881, he requested a further 70 missionaries, and, in 1886, 100 missionaries. In 1887 "The Hundred missionaries" were sent to China. Taylor travelled across several continents to recruit for the China Inland Mission. By the end of the nineteenth century, the CIM was well known around the world. Richard Lovett wrote about the practices of the missionaries in 1899. He noted that they were humble and not from the upper classes and they were having good success because they were willing to "rough it". That year Henrietta Soltau set up a training home for women missionaries in North London. She was secretary of the ladies' council of the CIM and hundreds were trained there.

China Inland Mission's focus on China's interior substantially expanded rural China's exposure to Protestantism.

=== Boxer Crisis of 1900 ===
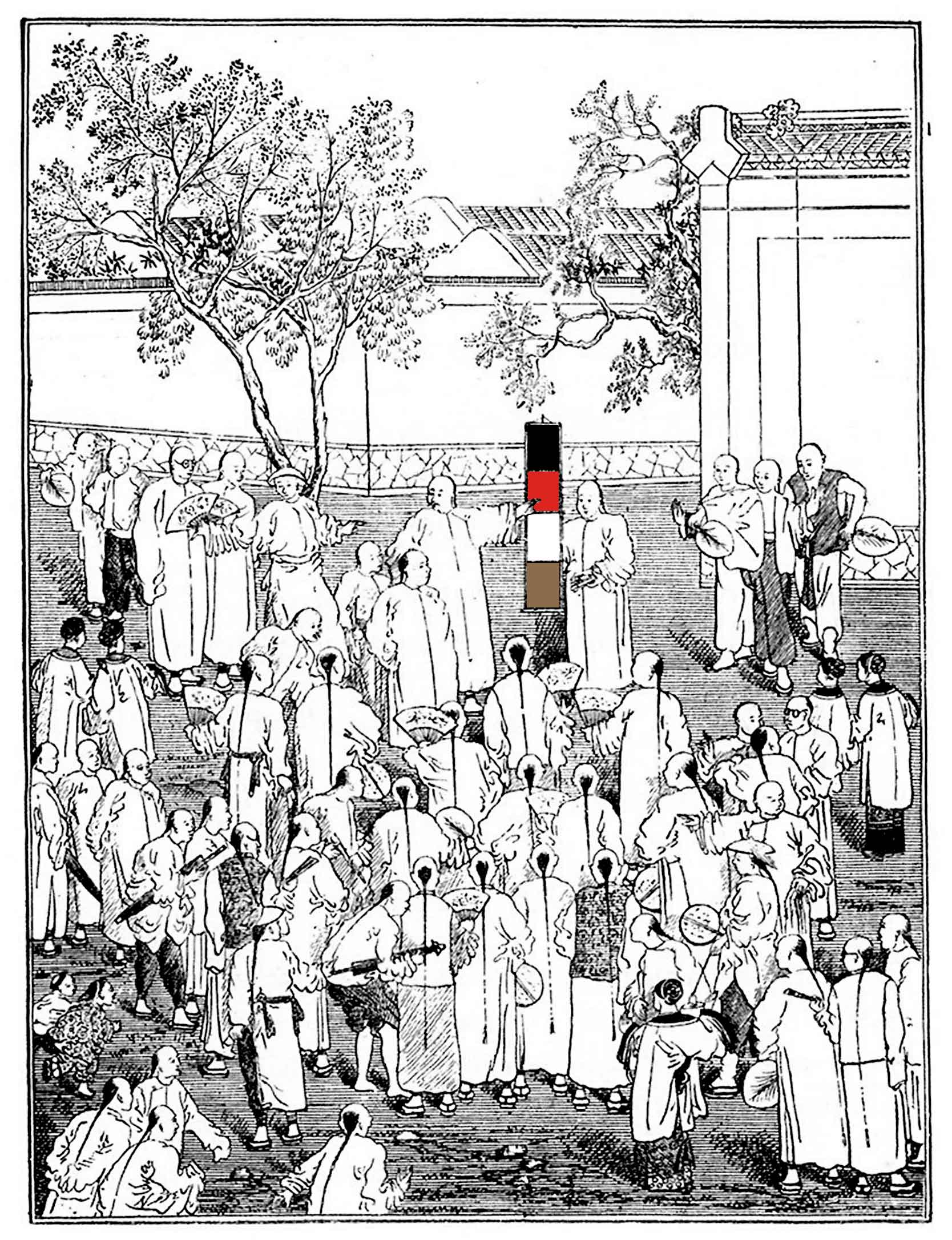
Missionary preaching in China using The Wordless Book

In 1900, attacks took place across China in connection with the Boxer Rebellion which targeted Christians and foreigners. The China Inland Mission lost more members than any other agency: 58 adults and 21 children were killed. However, in 1901, when the allied nations were demanding compensation from the Chinese government, Hudson Taylor refused to accept payment for loss of property or life in order to demonstrate the meekness of Christ to the Chinese. In the same year, Dixon Edward Hoste was appointed to the directorship of the mission.

=== Growth amid war and revolution ===
The early 1900s saw great expansion of missionary activity in China following the Boxer Rebellion, during the Revolution of 1912 and the establishment of the Chinese Republic. William Whiting Borden, wealthy heir of the Borden, Inc. family, who graduated from Yale University in 1909, left behind a comfortable life in America to respond to the call for workers with the Muslims of northwest China. He died in Egypt while still in training.

A musician and an engineer named James O. Fraser was the first to bring the Gospel message to the Lisu tribes of Yunnan in southwest China. This resulted in phenomenal church growth among the various tribes in the area that has endured to the 21st century.

The Warlord period brought widespread lawlessness to China and missionary work was often dangerous or deadly. John and Betty Stam were a young couple who were murdered in 1934 by Communist soldiers. Their biography, "The Triumph of John and Betty Stam", inspired a generation of missionaries to follow in the same steps of service despite the trials of war and persecution that raged in China in the 1930s and 1940s.

The Japanese invasion further complicated efforts as the Japanese distrusted anyone with British or American nationalities. When the Japanese invaded China in Second Sino-Japanese War, the China Inland Mission moved its headquarters upstream the Yangzi River to Chongqing. Many missionaries were put into concentration camps, such as Weifang, which lasted until the end of the war. The entire Chefoo School run by the mission at Yantai was imprisoned at a concentration camp. As the children and teachers were marched off they sang:

God is our refuge and strength,

A very present help in trouble. Therefore we will not fear…. The Lord of Hosts is with us,

The God of Jacob is our refuge. (Psalm 46:1,7)

Despite the hardships, the number of Christians in China increased from 100,000 in early 1900s to 700,000 by 1950. The Chinese church was beginning to develop into an indigenous movement, with the assistance from key leaders such as John Sung, Wang Ming-Dao, Watchman Nee and Andrew Gih.

== From CIM to OMF ==
Phyllis Thompson wrote that between 1949 and 1952 in the immediate aftermath of the Chinese Communist Revolution, there was a "reluctant exodus" of all of the members of the China Inland Mission. The leaders met at Bournemouth, England to discuss the situation and the decision was made to redeploy all of the missionaries into the rest of East Asia. Headquarters were moved to Singapore, and work commenced in Japan, Taiwan, Hong Kong, the Philippines, Thailand, Malaysia, Singapore, Vietnam, Cambodia, Laos and Indonesia. In addition to reducing some languages to written form, the Bible was translated, and basic theological education was given to neglected tribal groups. The publication and distribution of Christian literature were prioritized among both the rural tribes people and the urban working classes and students. The goal remained for every community to have a church in East Asia and thereby the Gospel would be preached "to every creature". The proclamation of the Christian message also included medical work. Three hospitals were opened in rural Thailand as well as a leprosy control programme. Many of the patients were refugees. In the Philippines, community development programs were launched. Alcoholic rehabilitation began in Japan, and rehabilitation work among prostitutes was begun in Taipei and Bangkok.

In 1980, Hudson Taylor's great grandson James Hudson Taylor III was appointed General Director for the mission work. According to Taylor in 1989,

"The fellowship has no desire to re-establish itself there (in China) in the form it used to have", but he also affirmed that "OMF is still deeply committed to the Chinese people. We can never forget that we came into existence as the China Inland Mission. Ever since our ‘reluctant exodus’ we have called the church worldwide to prayer for our brothers and sisters in China, and to share in proclaiming the gospel and nurturing millions of new believers through radio broadcasts and the provision of Bibles and Christian literature."

Dr. Patrick Fung, a Chinese Christian appointed in 2006, is the first Asian to lead the mission. The work continues to the present day.

== The old London headquarters building ==
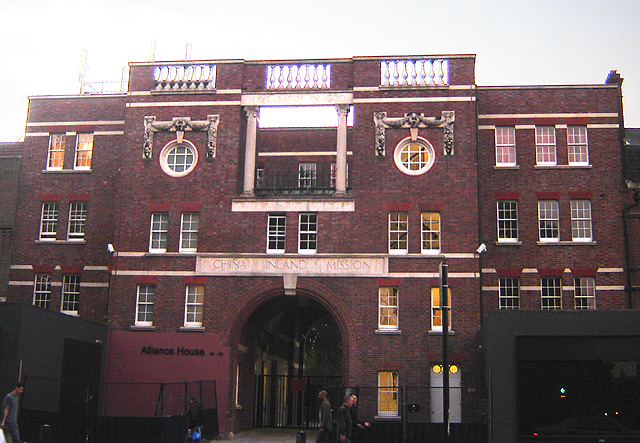
The China Inland Mission, one of two Grade II listed buildings on Newington Green. (October 2005).

The original headquarter was located at Newington Green in North London. By the late 19th century, when the CIM building was commissioned, what was once a rural village had long been subsumed into the metropolis. Newington Green had grown up around a core of English Dissenters and their famous academies. The CIM headquarters sits between two other listed buildings on the green, Newington Green Unitarian Church (1708), and the oldest brick terrace in London, 52-55 the Green, where the notable minister Richard Price lived.

The building was refurbished by Haworth Tompkins. Now known as Alliance House, it is run by Sanctuary Students as accommodation for City University.

== Chronology ==
=== 1860s ===
- China Inland Mission founded, 25 June 1865 in Brighton Beach, Sussex, England

Taylors and missionary candidates in 1865

- "China's Spiritual Need and Claims" by Hudson Taylor published, October 1865 in London
- The Occasional Paper of the China Inland Mission, January 1866 is first published, in London
- Lammermuir Party Sailed to China May 1866
- Lammermuir party arrived, December 1866 in 1 Xin Kai Long (New Lane), Hangzhou, Zhejiang, China
- 1866 Zhejiang - Hangzhou: (Hudson Taylor opened mission station as his headquarters).
- 1866 Zhejiang - Fenghua: George Crombie opened mission station.
- 1866 Zhejiang - Shaoxing: John Stevenson & his wife Ann opened mission station.

A map showing the nine Chinese provinces in black that were considered unreached by the Gospel message in 1865

- 1867 Zhejiang - Xiaoshan: Lewis & Eliza Nicol, James Williamson opened mission station.
- 1867 Zhejiang: John Sell dies of smallpox
- 1867 Zhejiang - Hangzhou: Grace Dyer Taylor, eldest daughter of Hudson and Maria, dies of meningitis
- 1867 Zhejiang - Taizhou: James Joseph Meadows, Josiah Jackson opened mission station.
- 1867 Jiangsu - Nanjing: George Duncan opened mission station.
- 1867 Lewis & Eliza Nicol dismissed due to conflict with Hudson Taylor
- 1868 Jiangsu - Yangzhou: Hudson Taylor opened mission station.
- 22 August 1868: Yangzhou riot
- 1868 Jiangsu - Huzhou: John McCarthy opened mission station.
- 1869 Anhui - Anqing: James Meadows, James Williamson opened mission station.
- 1869 Jiangxi - Jiujiang: John Edwin Cardwell and wife opened mission station.

=== 1870s ===
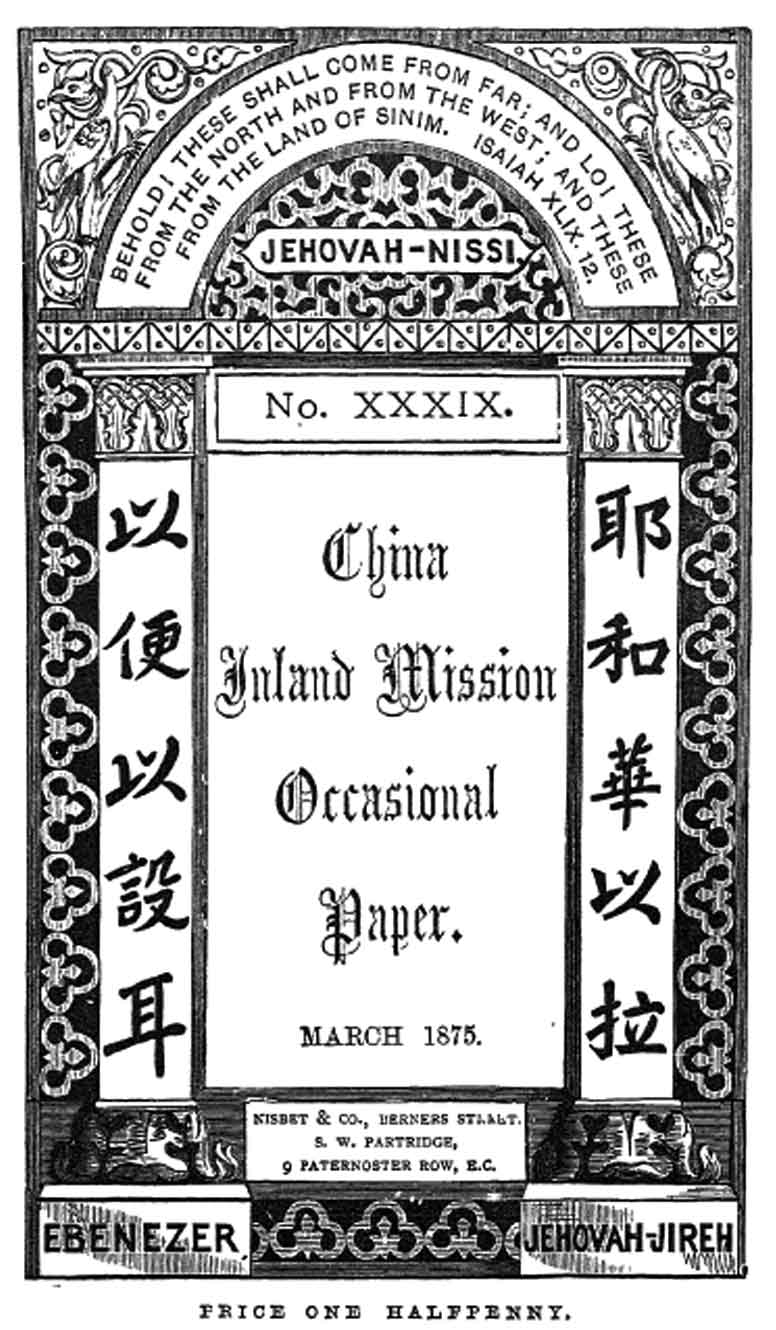
Cover of the Occasional Paper of the China Inland Mission in 1875

- Maria Jane Dyer "Mother of the Mission" died 23 July 1870 in Zhenjiang, Jiangsu, China
- 1871-1875 Jiangxi - Dagutang: J. E. Cardwell and wife opened mission station.
- 1874 Hubei - Wuchang: Hudson Taylor & Charles Judd opened mission station.
- An appeal for eighteen workers is published January 1875 in London
- China's Millions Vol. 1, No. 1, published July 1875 in London
- 1875 Henan: Henry Taylor is the first Protestant Christian to work in one of the 9 provinces of China so far considered unaware of the Gospel message.
- 1875 Hunan: Charles Henry Judd and Adam C. Dorward are the first Protestant Christian missionaries there and later the two travelled 1,500 miles across China from 1880-1882.
- 1876 Shanxi: Francis James and Joshua J. Turner are the first Protestant Christian missionaries there and begin to help out victims of the disaster and famine.
- 1876 Shaanxi: Frederick W. Baller, George King are the first Protestant Christian missionaries to work there.
- 1876 Gansu: George F. Easton and George Parker are the first Protestant Christian missionaries to work there.
- 1876 Sichuan: James Cameron is the first itinerant Protestant Christian missionary to work there. George Nicoll settles there after itineration (see also Protestantism in Sichuan).

Dixon Edward Hoste and fellow China Inland Mission missionaries in native dress

- 1877 Guizhou: Charles Henry Judd and James F. Broumton are the first Protestant Christian missionaries there. Broumton later pioneered work among the Miao and Yi people minority groups.
- 1877 Guangxi: Edward Fishe is the first Protestant Christian missionary there. He died the same year.
- 1877 Yunnan: John McCarthy traveled on foot from Zhenjiang to Hankou, via Sichuan, Guizhou and Yunnan to Bhamo in Myanmar; the trip lasted 7 months with preaching along the way. He was the first European to cross China by foot from east to west as well as the first Protestant Christian missionary to enter Yunnan Province.
- 1877 Tibet: James Cameron walked from Chongqing to Batang, the first to bring the Gospel to the Tibetan people. He then went on to Dali and Bhamo, then via Guangdong back to Chongqing, a journey covering 17 out of the then 18 Chinese provinces.
- 1878 Shaanxi: Jennie Taylor is the first female Christian missionary to travel in inland China, distributing relief for those affected by the Great North China Famine of 1877-78.
- 1879 Shaanxi: George and Emily Snow King are the first married missionary couple to settle in Hanzhong.
- 1879 Sichuan: M. A. Howland Nicoll is the first female Christian missionary to live in Chongqing.

=== 1880s ===
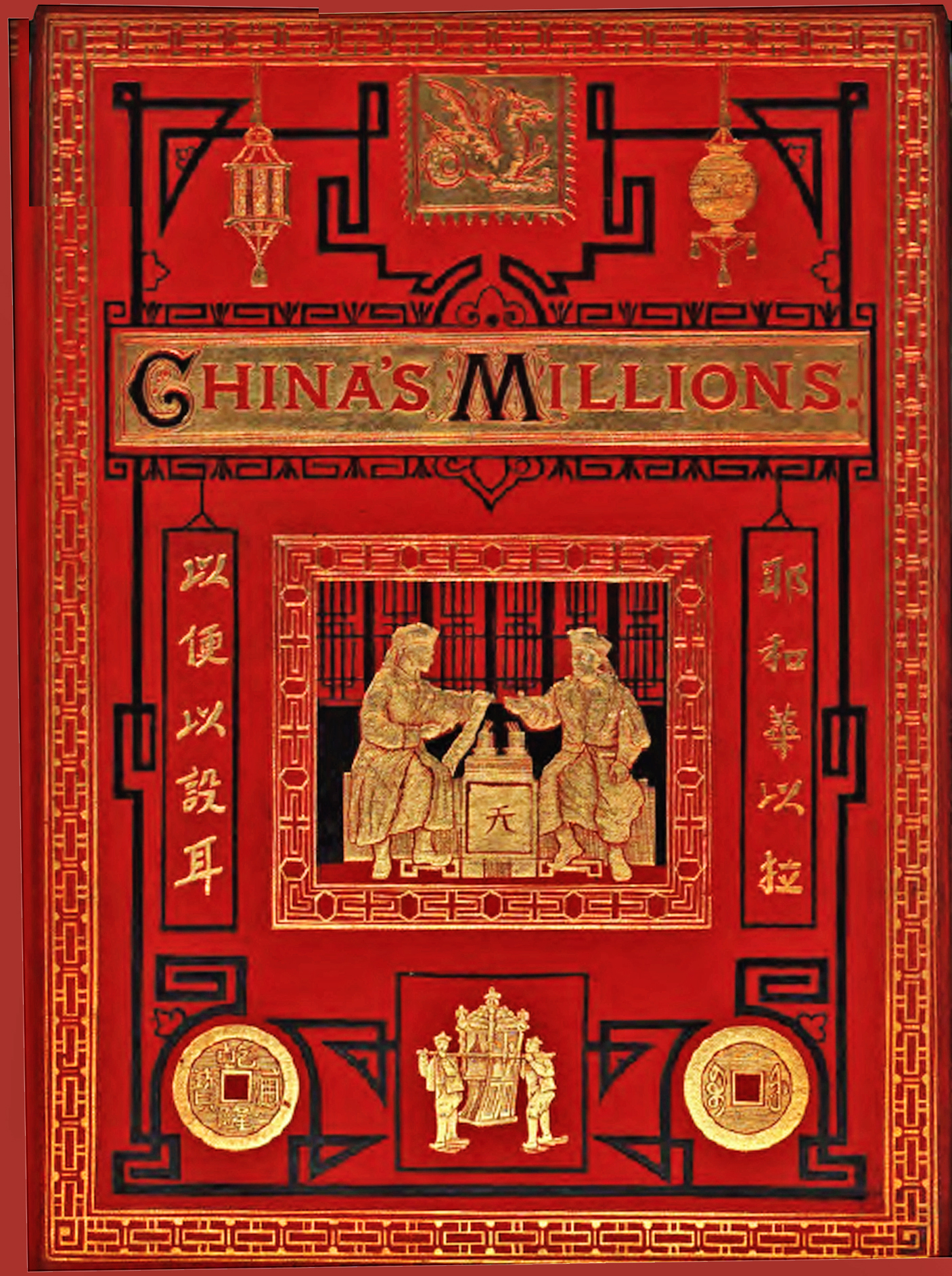
Cover of China's Millions for 1885

- 1880 Shanxi: Harold A. Schofield established the first China Inland Mission Hospital at Taiyuan.
- 1880 Gansu: Elizabeth Wilson, granddaughter of Elizabeth Hanbury, is the first female Christian missionary there.
- 1880 Guizhou: George Clarke and his wife Fanny settle to work there.
- 1881 Yunnan: John Stevenson and Henry Soltau travelled 1,900 miles in 86 days on foot from Bhamo, Kunming, Chongqing, Wuchang to Shanghai, setting a record from west to east.

First Party of Americans to join the CIM in 1888

- 1881 Yunnan: George and Fanny Clarke settle to work in Dali.
- 1881 Shandong: Chefoo School begun at Yantai (originally "The Protestant Collegiate School")
- Cambridge Seven arrived 3 March 1885 in China.
- The Hundred missionaries sent out in one year 1887.
- Benjamin Broomhall launches National Righteousness, an Anti-Opium Campaign periodical in 1888.
- First party of American missionaries arrived 30 October 1888 in Shanghai, China.
- 1889: North America Home Council formed.

=== 1890s ===
The China Inland Mission Headquarters in Shanghai. Late 1800s.

- Shanghai Headquarters at Wusong Road 1890.
- 1890 Australia Home Council for CIM formed.
- First party of Australian missionaries arrived in 1890.

First Party of Australians to join the CIM in 1890

- New Zealand Home Council formed.
- Newington Green office headquarters in London 1895.

=== 1900s ===
- Boxer Rebellion of 1900 claims 58 missionaries and 21 children killed from the China Inland Mission.
- In 1901 Hudson Taylor refused to accept compensation payment from the Chinese government for loss of property or life, to show the 'meekness and gentleness of Christ'
- 1901, A council was set up, headquartered in Philadelphia, to supervise the mission's work in the United States
- Dixon Edward Hoste appointed acting General Director in 1901

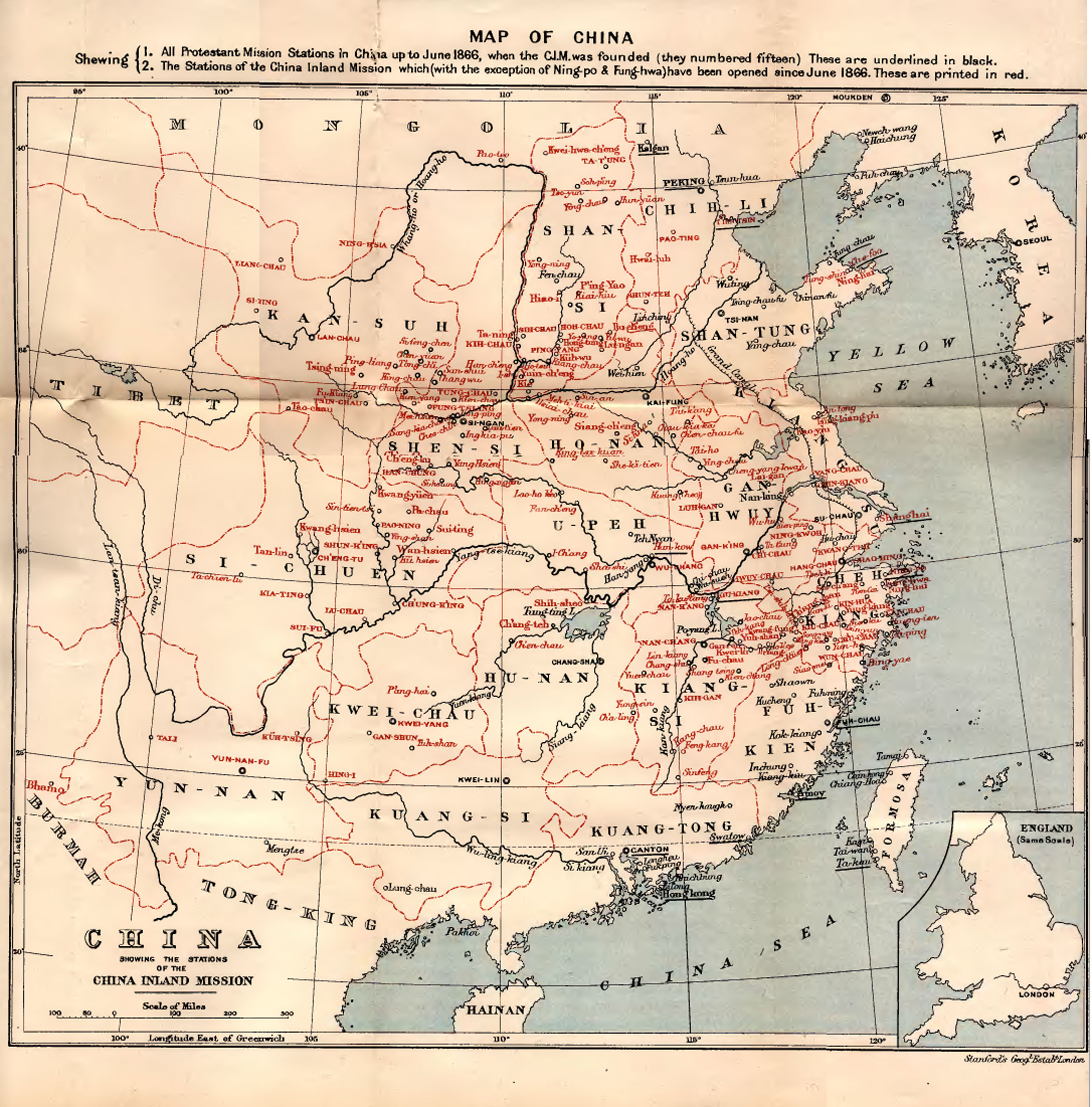
CIM missions as of 1902

- James Hudson Taylor resigned as Director of the China Inland Mission November 1902
- 1904 Xinjiang: George Hunter opens a mission station
- James Hudson Taylor died 3 June 1905 in Changsha, Hunan, China
- Empress Dowager dies in 1908
- China Inland Mission sent relief team to flood and famine in Jiangsu, Anhui and Henan

=== 1910s ===
- J. O. Fraser arrived in China in 1910
- 60,000 Christians in West Yunnan, China tribal region
- 1911 Benjamin Broomhall died after his Anti-Opium Campaign succeeds
- Chinese Republic established in 1912
- In 1912 membership in the China Inland Mission exceeds 1,000, then the largest mission agency working in China
- 1915 1,063 workers were working at 227 stations.

=== 1920s ===
- 1925 Gustav Burklin arrives in China
- 1927 The Chinese Civil War forced a temporary evacuation of nearly all of the missionaries
- 1929-1932 The China Inland Mission is This was part of 'The Forward Movement' as the Missionaries moved back to their stations. The 'Call for Two Hundred New Workers' was issued in March 1929 and shared in China's Millions in May 1929

=== 1930s ===
- Headquarters in Shanghai move to Sinza Road in 1930
- By 31 December 1931 the last of the Two Hundred New Workers had sailed.
- 1934 1,368 missionaries were serving at 364 stations. The mission staff also included hundreds of Chinese pastors, teachers, colporteurs, chapel keepers and Bible women.
- John and Betty Stam executed in South Anhui in 1934
- World War II forced many of the missionaries further inland – or they were captured by the Japanese and detained until the end of the war
- By 1939, 200,000 Chinese and Minority people had been baptised by CIM workers

=== 1940s ===
- 1942, 1,263 missionaries. The headquarters was evacuated out of Shanghai to escape the Japanese army. An emergency headquarters was set up in Chongqing, the same city where the Chinese government had relocated.
- November 1942 China Inland Mission School at Chefoo (Yantai) is closed and all students and staff imprisoned.
- 1943, South Africa Home Council formed
- August 1945 China Inland Mission School at Chefoo (Yantai) is liberated by American paratroopers
- 1945, The staff moved back to Shanghai
- 1 October 1949 Mao Zedong proclaims People's Republic of China in Beijing
- Werner Bürklin. son of Gustav and Lina Bürklin was born in Wuhu, Province Anhui

=== 1950s ===
- After "The Christian Manifesto", the China Inland Mission began to withdraw its missionaries ending in 1953
- 1950, 1,104 missionaries, of whom 757 were in China. CIM home council started in Switzerland
- 1951 Three-Self Patriotic Movement launched allowing government control of Christian assembly
- In November 1951, a new headquarters was set up in Singapore, and the organisations name was changed to The China Inland Mission Overseas Missionary Fellowship
- 1951, A temporary headquarters was set up in Hong Kong, mainly to oversee the withdrawal of the missionaries.
- 14 October 1954, The mission was reorganised at a meeting of the mission's overseas council. The council reaffirmed the need for the mission, but changed its structure so that non-Western Christians could become full members and set up home councils in their own countries. The main emphasis of the OMF was to continue to be evangelism, but support would also be given to a literature programme, medical services, radio and TV outreach, student work and linguistic work.
- Re-deployment of all missionaries to East Asia

=== 1960s ===
- China Inland Mission renamed Overseas Missionary Fellowship in 1964
- Chinese Cultural Revolution 1966–1972: all Christians silenced including the Three-Self Patriotic Movement
- Medical work begun in rural Thailand
- 1965 Japan, Singapore and Malaysia Home Councils formed
- 1966 Hong Kong and Philippines Home Councils formed
- 1967 German and Netherlands Home Councils formed
- 1969 The council for North America was dissolved and the U.S. and Canadian councils became completely autonomous.

=== 1970s ===
- 1975 Merger with Borneo Evangelical Mission (BEM)

=== 1980s ===
- 1980-1990 James Hudson Taylor III served as seventh General Director.
- Chinese Church reaches 21.5 million baptised members, over 52 million including Christian families and adherents
- Werner Bürklin, born in China, returns to China in 1980 to start a teaching ministry, first in Nanchang, Jiangxi and then in many cities across China. He founded China Partner, a mission organisation to facilitate this. Later his son Erik alongside his daughter Linda continued this ministry.

=== 1990s ===
- Overseas Missionary Fellowship renamed OMF International
- 1993 First OMF workers enter Mongolia
- 1994 AIDS ward opens at Manorom Hospital, Thailand
- 1995 OMF establishes web presence
- 1999 OMF workers involved in relief operation after Taiwan earthquake

=== 2000s ===
- 2004 OMF involved in relief after Asian tsunami
- 2006 Dr Patrick Fung is appointed as General Director, the first Asian to hold this position in OMF.
- 2008 OMF involved in relief work, including counselling, after the 2008 Sichuan earthquake.

=== 2010s ===
- 2011 OMF involved in relief, counselling and visiting temporary housing following 2011 Tōhoku earthquake and tsunami
- 2014 OMF reopens its OMF Southern Africa centre, based in South Africa
- 2015 OMF Celebrates 150 years: 1865-2015.
- 2016 OMF joins the Faith2Share network of mission agencies.
- OMF International has 1400 workers from over 40 nations, serving globally.

== List of General Directors of CIM & OMF International ==
| Name | Information | Years in office |
|---|---|---|
| James Hudson Taylor | Married to Maria (née Dyer, d. 1870), Jennie (née Faulding) | 1865-1902 |
| Dixon Edward Hoste | Married to Gertrude (née Broomhall) | 1902-1935 |
| George W. Gibb | Married to Margaret (née Emslie, d. 1936), E. G. (née Kendon) | 1935-1940 |
| Frank Houghton | Married to Dorothy (née Cassels) | 1940-1951 |
| The Directorate | During these transition years, the Mission was led by the Directorate made up of the following directors of the Mission: Arnold J. Lea (Overseas Director), J. Oswald Sanders (Home Director for Australia and New Zealand) Rowland J. R. Butler (Assistant Overseas Director), Ford L. Canfield (Assistant Overseas Director), H. M. Griffin (Home Director for North America), and Fred Mitchell (Home Director for Great Britain). | 1951-1954 |
| John Oswald (J.O) Sanders | Married to Edith (née Dobson, d. 1966), Mary (née Miller) | 1954-1969 |
| Michael C. Griffiths | Married to Valerie | 1969-1981 |
| James Hudson Taylor III | Married to Leone. Taylor was the great grandson of Hudson Taylor | 1981-1991 |
| David Pickard | Married to Sue | 1991-2001 |
| David Harley | Married to Rosemary | 2001-2006 |
| Patrick Fung | Married to Jennie | 2006–2023 |
| Joseph Chang | Married to Lori | 2024-present |

== See also ==
- Hudson Taylor
- Cambridge Seven
- James O. Fraser
- John Oswald Sanders
- William Thomas Berger
- Benjamin Broomhall
- Rudolf Alfred Bosshardt
- Arthur Glasser
- Norman Howard Cliff
- Tony Lambert
- Leslie Theodore Lyall
- Mildred Cable
- Africa Inland Mission
- Australian Inland Mission
- School of Oriental and African Studies in London
- List of Protestant theological seminaries in China

== Archives ==
The papers of the China Inland Mission are held by SOAS Archives, the Billy Graham Center for Evangelism at Wheaton College , the OMF International Center in Singapore , the Hong Kong Baptist University, and several regional offices.

== Selected publications ==
- China Inland Mission (1886). J. HUDSON TAYLOR (ed.). China's millions. HAZELL, WATSON, AND VINEY, LD., PRINTERS, LONDON AND AYLESBURY: China Inland Mission. LONDON : MORGAN AND SCOTT, 12, PATERNOSTER BUILDINGS, E.C. Original from the New York Public Library Digitized Aug 15, 2006.
- Frederick William Baller; China Inland Mission (1912). Lessons in elementary Wen-li. China Inland Mission. p. 128.
- Frederick William Baller; China Inland Mission (1900). Mandarin primer: prepared for the use of junior members of the China Inland Mission (4 ed.). China Inland Mission. p. 350.
- Frederick William Baller; China Inland Mission (1921). An idiom a lesson: a short course in elementary Chinese (3 ed.). Morgan and Scott Ltd. pp. 106.
- Robert Henry Mathews; Frederick William Baller (1938). Kuoyü primer: progressive studies in the Chinese national language. China inland mission. p. 5.
- Frederick William Baller; China Inland Mission (1900). An analytical Chinese-English dictionary. China inland mission and American Prebysterian mission press. p. 637.
- China Inland Mission (1887). A primer in the Mandarin dialect: containing lessons and vocabularies, and notes on Chinese constructions and idioms; also a dialogue on Christianity; translations of passports, leases, boat agreements, etc. Interleaved, and with large map of China. Prepared for the use of junior members of the ... China Inland Mission; and American Presbyterian Mission Press. p. 250.
- China Inland Mission (1906). The Shansi tune book. China Inland Mission. p. 30.(Princeton University)
