= Frederick W. Baller =

Frederick William Baller
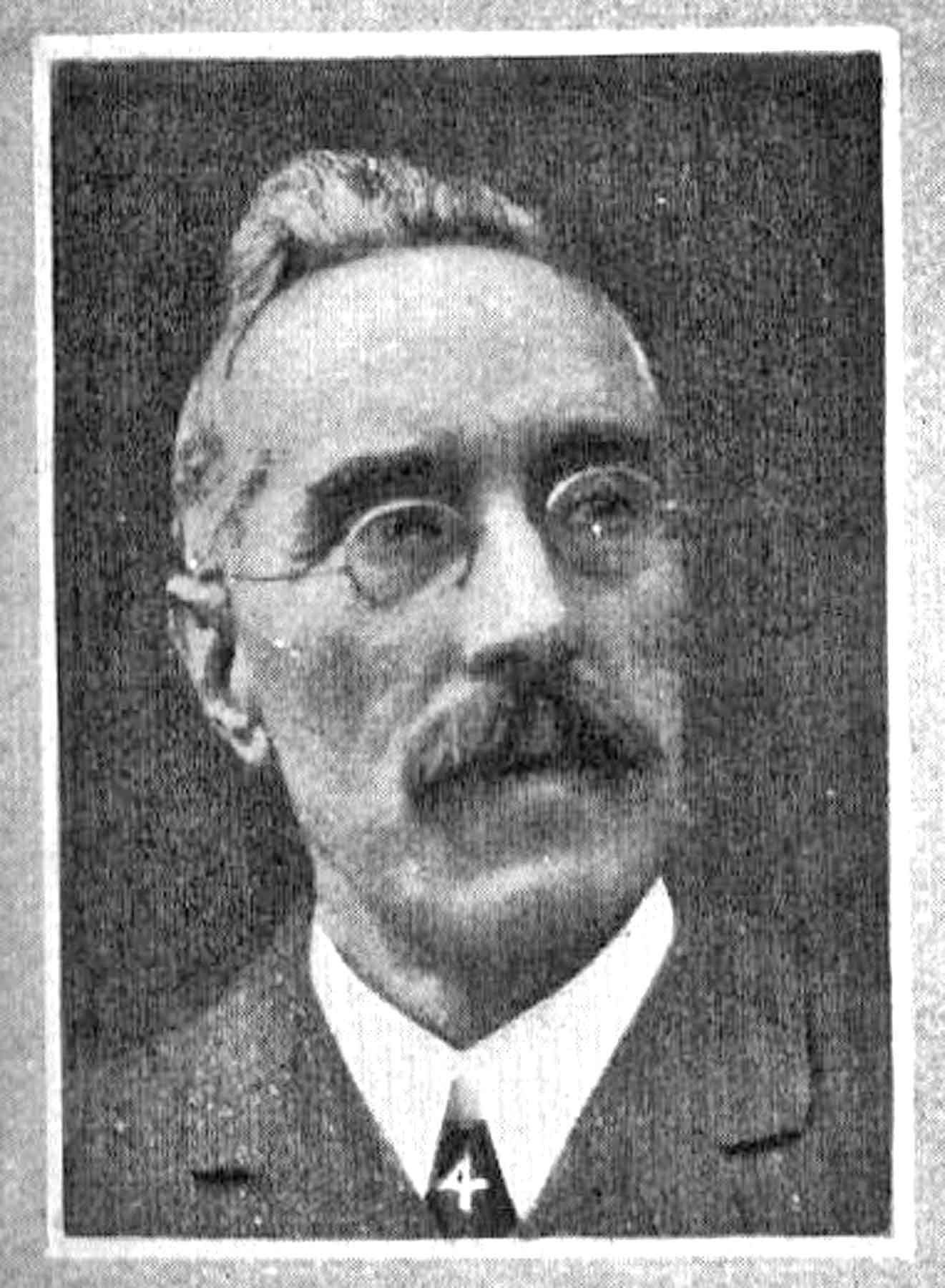
- Missionary to China
- Born: 21 November 1852; England
- Died: 12 August 1922 (aged 69); Shanghai, China

Frederick William Baller (21 November 1852 – 12 August 1922) was a British Protestant Christian missionary to China, Chinese linguist, translator, educator and sinologist.

== Missionary career ==
Following his conversion to Christianity at age 17, Baller was one of the first students of the Missionary Institute established in the East End of London by Henry Grattan Guinness.

Baller applied to the China Inland Mission (CIM) and left England on 3 September 1873 with Charles Henry Judd, M. Henry Taylor, and Mary Bowyer. They arrived at Shanghai on 5 November 1873. The following year, he and Mary Bowyer were married at Shanghai, on 17 September. Mary was a veteran missionary to China who had ventured out with Hudson Taylor on the Lammermuir (clipper) in 1866, at the beginning of the China Inland Mission. She had been baptised by Taylor, along with some others, en route at the Sunda Strait.

Baller studied the Chinese language in Nanking (Nanjing), then just recently liberated from the ravages of the Taiping rebels. Baller was then appointed superintendent of missions in Anhui and Jiangsu with the China Inland Mission. He went to Shanxi in 1876, with George King, to distribute famine relief. Due to the continued famine in 1878, he returned to Shanxi with Taylor's wife Jane Elizabeth Faulding and single women missionaries Horne and Crickmay. Baller took a China Inland Mission party through Hunan, facing anti-foreign opposition, to Guiyang in 1880, visiting the capital of Guizhou. He was appointed secretary to the first China Inland Mission China Council in 1885.

Mary (Bowyer) Baller.

== Writing and teaching career ==
In 1896, he was appointed principal of the new training home for CIM male missionaries at Anqing and Sichuan. There he not only helped train missionaries in the Chinese language but also published his lectures in Letters, from an Old Missionary to His Nephew (1907).

In 1897, he began his extensive literary work. From 1900 to 1918 he served on the committee to revise the Mandarin Bible as a member of the Union Mandarin Bible Revision Committee at Beijing, for the New Testament in 1907, and the Old Testament 1907–1918. He was one of the translators of the Christian Union Version of the Bible, along with Calvin Wilson Mateer, Cheng Jingyi and George Owen.

Among his many books, the best known are An Anglo-Chinese Dictionary, The Mandarin Primer (at least 14 editions), An Idiom a Lesson, An Analytical Vocabulary of the New Testament, Lessons in Wenli, An English Translation of the Sacred Edict, and The Life of Hudson Taylor.

After the death of his first wife, Baller married H. B. Fleming on 23 January 1912.

Due to his work with the Chinese language, in 1915 he was made a Life Governor of the British and Foreign Bible Society; he was also a vice-president of the National Bible Society of Scotland; and a Life Member of the American Bible Society.

In 1919, Baller went on furlough after nineteen years of uninterrupted service in China.

Baller died in 1922 and was buried in Shanghai shortly after completing his book on Taylor.

== Works authored or translated ==
- Frederick William Baller (1912). Lessons in elementary Wen-li. SHANGHAI: China Inland Mission. p. 128.
- Frederick William Baller (1900). Mandarin primer: prepared for the use of junior members of the China Inland Mission (4 ed.). SHANGHAI: China Inland Mission. p. 350.
- Frederick William Baller (1921). An idiom a lesson: a short course in elementary Chinese (3 ed.). SHANGHAI: Morgan and Scott Ltd. pp. 106.
- Robert Henry Mathews; Frederick William Baller (1938). Kuoyü primer: progressive studies in the Chinese national language. China inland mission. p. 5.
- Frederick William Baller (1900). An analytical Chinese-English dictionary. SHANGHAI: China inland mission and American Prebysterian mission press. p. 637.
- Life of C. H. Spurgeon Translated into Mandarin
- A Retrospect by J. Hudson Taylor (translated into Chinese)
- An analytical Chinese-English dictionary : compiled for the China Inland Mission (1900)
- 'An analytical vocabulary of the New Testament (1907)
- A Mandarin primer (1911)
- An idiom a lesson; a short course in elementary Chinese (1921)
- Frederick William Baller (1907). An analytical vocabulary of the New Testament (2 ed.). SHANGHAI: China Inland Mission and American Presbyterian Mission Press. pp. 418.(Harvard University)
- Frederick William Baller (1893). An analytical vocabulary of the New Testament. SHANGHAI: China inland mission and American Presbyterian mission press. pp. 264.(Harvard University)
- Frederick William Baller (1913). The A.B.C. of Chinese writing ... China inland mission. p. 70.(Princeton University)
- Frederick William Baller (1892). The Sacred edict. SHANGHAI: American Presbyterian Mission Press. pp. 216.(Columbia University)
- Frederick William Baller (1892). A vocabulary of the colloquial rendering of the Sacred edict. SHANGHAI: American Presbyterian mission press. pp. 217.(the University of California)
- Frederick William Baller (1907). The sacred edict: with a translation of the colloquial rendering (2nd, reprint ed.). American Presbyterian Mission Press. pp. 216.
- Frederick William Baller (1924). The Sacred edict: Shen yü kuang hsün, with a translation of the colloquial rendering (6th ed.). China Inland Mission. p. 216.(the University of Michigan)

== See also ==
- Christianity in Anhui
- Christianity in Jiangsu
- Protestantism in Sichuan

== Bibliography ==
- Broomhall, Alfred (1985). Hudson Taylor and China's Open Century: Assault On The Nine. London: Hodder and Stoughton.
- Broomhall, Marshall (1915). The Jubilee Story of the China Inland Mission. London: Morgan and Scott.
- Guinness, Mary Geraldine (1893). The Story of the China Inland Mission vol II. London: Morgan and Scott.
- Taylor, Dr. and Mrs. Howard (1918). Hudson Taylor and the China Inland Mission; The Growth of a Work of God. London: Morgan and Scott.
