= Charles Judd (missionary) =

British Protestant missionary

Charles Henry Judd
- Missionary to China
- Born: 1842; Loughborough, Leicestershire, England
- Died: 23 October 1919 (aged 76–77); London, England

Charles Henry Judd (1842 – 23 October 1919) was a British Protestant missionary to China with the China Inland Mission. He was among the first to bring news of the Gospel to Guizhou, Hunan, and Hebei during the late Qing dynasty when travel was limited to walking or river boat journeys.

== Missionary experiences ==
Charles Henry Judd, was the son of Robert Judd and (Mrs.) Jane Judd. He was born prior to 26 July 1842.

Judds first occupation was as a bank clerk in Loughborough. He later enrolled at the Church Missionary Society College, Islington, London, in preparation to joining the Church Missionary Society. His convictions regarding believer baptism (as opposed to infant baptism) changed his plans, however. Judd attended meetings at Welbeck Street and was acquainted with the CMS missionary Frederick Foster Gough. After the Lammermuir Party had sailed for China, Judd became aware of the writings of Henry Grattan Guinness, and met Thomas John Barnardo at Gough's home in Bow, East End of London. As a result, he became interested in James Hudson Taylor's mission and his book "China's Spiritual Need and Claims". Soon Judd ceased attending the CMS training institute. For several months he lived with William Thomas Berger at Saint Hill Manor, near East Grinstead, Sussex, serving as a tutor in English.

Judd married Elizabeth Jane Broumton in October 1867. The newly married couple left for China with Mrs. Ann Bohannan, John Edwin Cardwell and wife, and Edward Fishe. The party arrived in China on 3 March 1868. In 1868 Judd was assigned to Yangzhou, Jiangsu. It was here that the couple saw what hardships possibly awaited them in China, arriving not long after the Yangzhou riot had nearly claimed the lives of Taylor and his family and fellow missionaries.

Charles and Elizabeth Judd

In 1869 the Judds were stationed at Zhenjiang, Jiangsu. They returned to England on furlough in 1872 and came again to China in 1873. In 1874 Judd was at Wuchang, Hubei, with J. Hudson Taylor opening a mission station. In 1875, with Adam C. Dorward and two Chinese going into the "unreached" interior of China for the first time for any missionary in Hunan, they rented a house at Yuezhou (now Yueyang), but were forced out by local Chinese.

In 1877 Judd and his brother-in-law James F. Broumton traveled through Hunan province to become the first Protestant Christian missionaries in Guiyang, Guizhou. Broumton later pioneered work among the Miao and Yi people minority groups. Only the British explorer William Mesny had attempted the introduction of Christianity earlier in Guizhou. While Broumton remained at Guiyang, Judd returned to Wuchang via Chongqing, Sichuan.

In 1879 Judd was doing missionary work at Yantai [or Chefoo], Shandong, before the CIM "Chefoo School" and sanatorium were established there.

Adam Dorward and Judd traveled on an evangelistic journey 1500 miles across China from 1880 to 1882.

Judd left China again between 1885 and May 1887. He returned, then left again in May 1894. Judd died in London, England, on 23 October 1919. Elizabeth Judd died in 1926. They had several children: George H. Judd, Edwin Judd, Frederick Hudson Judd, Charles H. Judd Jr. and Ross Judd.

== See also ==
- Historical Bibliography of the China Inland Mission
- List of China Inland Mission missionaries in China
