= Grace Dyer Taylor =

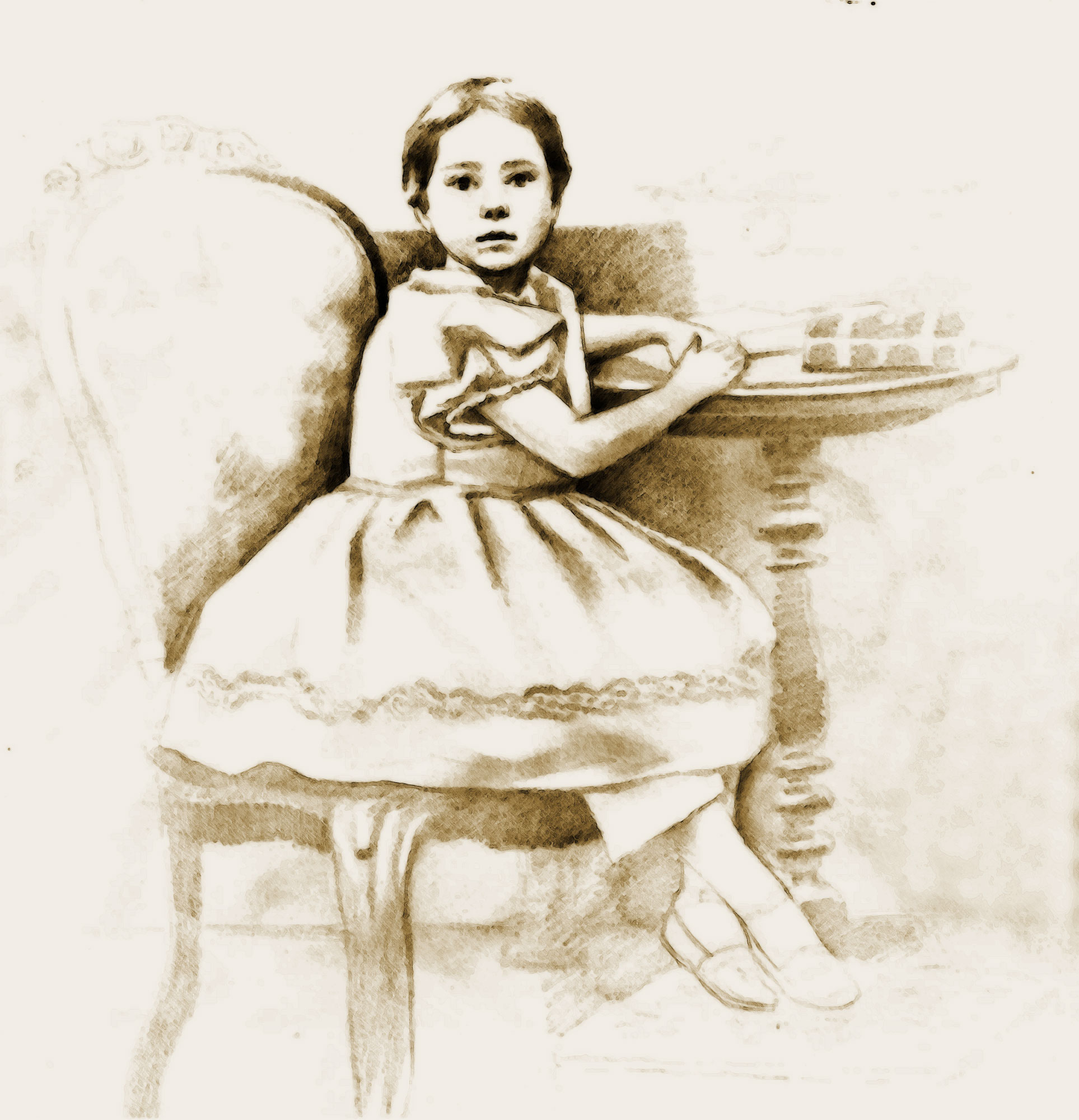
- Gracie Taylor in 1866
- Born: 31 July 1859; Ningbo, Zhejiang, China
- Died: August 23, 1867 (aged 8) near Hangzhou, China

Grace Dyer Taylor (31 July 1859 – 23 August 1867) was the eldest surviving daughter of James Hudson Taylor and Maria Jane Dyer, Christian missionaries to China. The event of her death of meningitis at the age of eight near Hangzhou has been cited by mission historians such as Ruth Tucker, Roger Steer, and John Pollock as being a turning point in the history of the China Inland Mission.

== A short life ==
Grace was born in Ningbo during the Second Opium War, the day after rioting broke out in parts of the city. The Taylors had only one means of escape if the church building where they lived ever came under attack: a rope hanging from a second story window down to the narrow canal behind their home. The last instance that they came close to needing it was the day before Grace was born.

The oldest station of the China Inland Mission was the Bridge Street church in Ningbo where Grace was born

At the back of the premises in Ningbo there was a rope tied to a window for escape in case of a riot

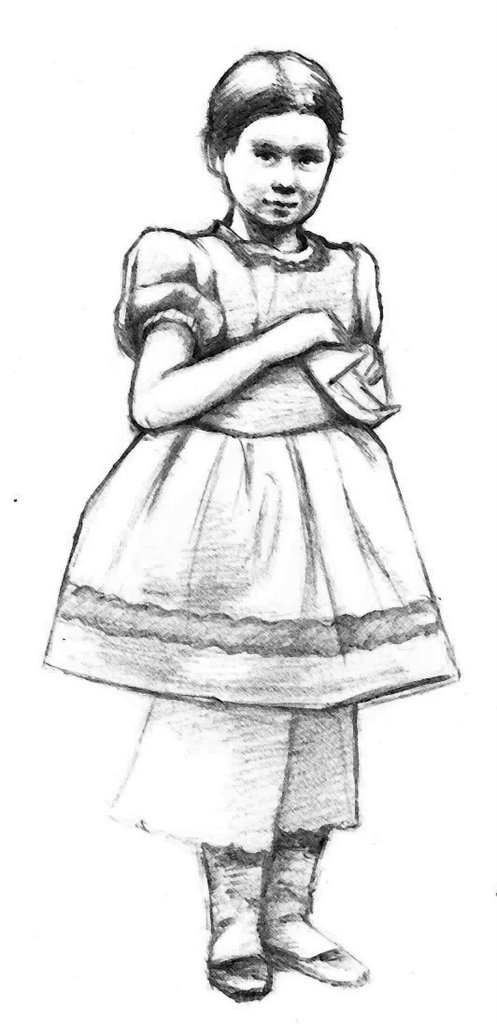
Grace at about age 5 in London

In 1860 her parents took her on a furlough to England with them and while there, her father founded the China Inland Mission in 1865. She spent the next six years in London where three younger brothers joined the family.

In 1866 Grace was one of the four Taylor children to journey with the "Lammermuir Party", the largest group of Protestant missionaries that had ever sailed, returning to China in 1866.

Her father was criticized for taking unmarried women missionaries into China, and replied in this way,

I am taking my children with me, and I notice it is not difficult to remember that they need breakfast in the morning, dinner at midday and supper at night. Indeed, I could not forget them if I tried. And I find it impossible to think that our heavenly Father is less tender and mindful of His children than I, a poor earthly father, am of mine. No, He will not forget us!

On board the tea clipper Lammermuir, Grace shared a cabin with Emily Blatchley, who was in charge of teaching the Taylor children. Jennie Faulding was one of the first to take note of Grace's apparent conversion to Christianity along with a number of the crew while they sailed across the Indian Ocean. The Lammermuir was almost wrecked by two typhoons before arriving in battered shape at Shanghai. There were no deaths, but the passengers and crew were weary and exhausted on their arrival.

In China during 1867 the young missionary agency was troubled by internal divisions that nearly frustrated the mission. Grace's father's policy that all should wear the native Chinese clothing—missionaries and children alike—was controversial among the Protestant British in China. During the critical first year of the China Inland Mission in Hangzhou, Grace suffered from a fever and died. Her death shook the Taylor family severely, but it also aroused sympathy for and brought a realization among the missionaries and the Chinese that no cost was too great to the Taylors in bringing the Gospel to China. Internal differences among the missionaries were shortly resolved and the work continued in scope.

Tucker writes:

The price was high, but the mission was saved. During the heat of the summer of 1867, a year and a half after the missionaries had arrived in China, eight-year-old Gracie Taylor...became ill. For days Taylor sat beside her, giving her the best medical attention he was capable of giving, but her situation did not improve. The climate had taken its toll on others; and during his vigil with Gracie, he was called away to treat Jane McLean, one of the missionaries who had strongly opposed him, Her illness was not as serious as supposed, and she soon recovered; but Taylor's delay in returning home to Gracie proved critical. He diagnosed water on the brain, but he was too late to be of any help. Her death was... heartrending...but it saved the CIM. The grievances were forgotten, and the outpouring of sympathy brought the missionaries back together...

Hudson recalled his daughter's Christian faith for years afterward. His memory of taking Grace and Bertie, Freddie and Sammie for a walk shortly before her death is repeated in several biographies. Hudson had wanted to have some quiet prayer with them under a shady tree in the heat of summer. He held Grace's hand as they were walking into the woods up a steep stony path made for the Buddhist pilgrims. Soon they came upon a man making an idol by the side of the path. Grace asked him if he were really making one of the idols that they would worship instead of God. When he told her that it was- she said “Oh papa, that man does not know Jesus! He would never make an ugly idol like that if he knew Jesus. Do tell him about Jesus!” Hudson stopped and spoke kindly to the man about Grace's request. The man went on finishing his idol and did not seem to care. Taking Grace's hand again, they went on walking. Even when she looked back- the man was still at his work. When they stopped under a big tree, Hudson asked, “What shall we sing, Gracie, dear?” She said, “Let us have “Rock of Ages, cleft for me". Her father recalled the moment decades later:

We sung a hymn, and then I said, ‘Will you pray first?’ She did so and never had I heard such a prayer. She had seen the man making an idol; her heart was full, and she was talking to God on his behalf. The dear child went on and on, pleading that God would have mercy upon the poor Chinese and would strengthen her father to preach to them. I was never so moved by any prayer. My heart was bowed before God. Words fail to describe it.

Grace's younger siblings that survived went on to become missionaries in China: Herbert Hudson Taylor, Frederick Howard Taylor, and Maria Hudson (Taylor) Coulthard.

In a letter dated Thursday 29 August 1867, Hudson Taylor wrote to William Thomas Berger in England:

Beloved Brother-The Lord has taken our sweet little Gracie to bloom in the purer atmosphere of His own presence. Our hearts bleed; but ‘Above the rest this note shall swell - Our Jesus has done all things well.' The Gardener came and plucked a rose.

Grace's remains were buried in an above-ground tomb in the rock-garden on the property of the China Inland Mission compound in Hangzhou. Wang Laijun spent several weeks making her a heavily lacquered wooden coffin. Her funeral was held on the anniversary of the Lammermuir Party's arrival in Shanghai. However, due to fears that human remains being interred on the premises might create misunderstandings and possibly violent conflict with local sensibilities, her remains were moved by boat on the Grand Canal to Zhenjiang, where her mother and two brothers had been laid to rest not long after her death. The small Protestant cemetery where she was buried in Zhenjiang was where Hudson wanted to be laid to rest as well. He followed his wife and four children there in 1905. The cemetery itself was destroyed during the Chinese Cultural Revolution by Red Guards in China as part of the Destruction of the Four Olds campaign. Today there are industrial buildings over the site.

== Chronology ==
1859-1860

- born 31 July 1859 in Bridge Street, Ningbo (Ningpo), Zhejiang, China
- sailed to England (via Cape of Good Hope) with her parents aboard the Jubilee (clipper) Wednesday 18 July 1860 – sailed 19 July
- the Jubilee arrived Monday 20 November 1860 anchor off Gravesend, England: 4 months & 3 days (126 days aboard)

1861-1865

- moved with parents Tuesday 9 April 1861 in #1 Beaumont Street, London
- moved with parents Wednesday 6 October 1864 in #30 Coborn Street, London

1866-67

- Sailed to China (via Cape of Good Hope) aboard the Lammermuir (clipper) (part of the "Lammermuir Party", with her parents Saturday 26 May 1866
- 13 August 1866: evident to Maria & Hudson that Grace is converted to Christ
- September 1866: sailing through 2 typhoons in the East China Sea & Pacific Ocean
- The Lammermuir arrived 29 September 1866 in Wusong, China
- 27 October 1866 departure from Shanghai along the Grand Canal of China
- 22 November 1866 Arrival in Hangzhou
- Died of meningitis at Pengshan Temple 8:50pm Friday, 23 August 1867: 8 years & 24 days old

== Notes ==
=== Further reading ===
- Historical Bibliography of the China Inland Mission
