= Emily Blatchley =

British Protestant missionary to China (c. 1842 – 1874)

- Missionary to China
- Born: unknown England
- Died: 26 July 1874; London, England

Emily Blatchley (c. 1842 – 26 July 1874) was a British Protestant Christian missionary to China with the China Inland Mission. She pioneered the work of single women missionaries in China and served as personal secretary to the founder of the mission, Hudson Taylor.

== Biography ==
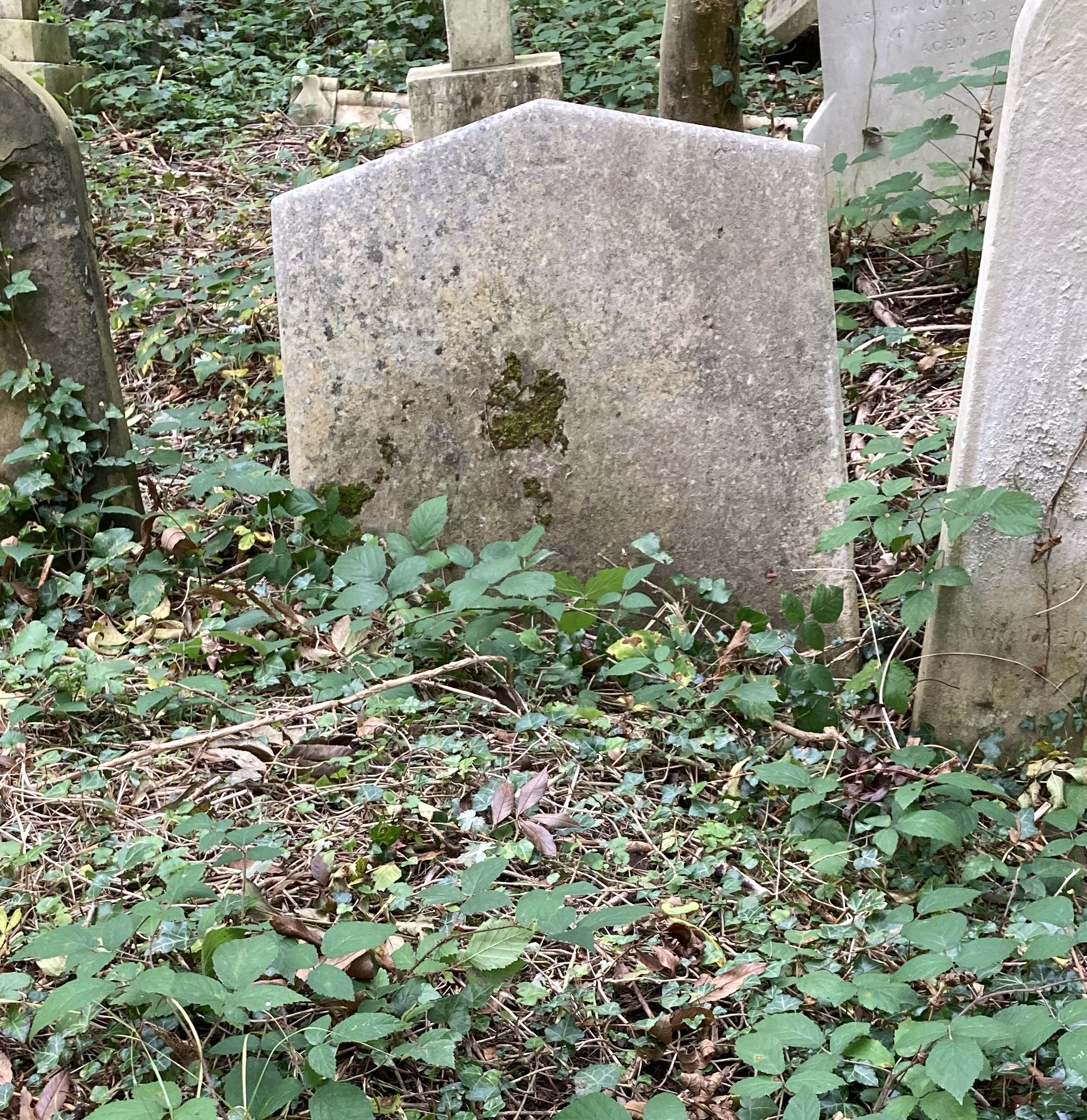
Grave of Emily Blatchley in Highgate Cemetery

Emily Blatchley in Chinese dress

Blatchley lost her mother and father before her experience as a missionary. She was an 1865 graduate of the Home and Colonial Training College along with her friend Jane Elizabeth Faulding. Hudson Taylor's family unofficially adopted her as one of their own. Her attendance at the weekly prayer meeting for China at Coborn Street in Bromley-by-Bow, East End of London (as well as Taylor's book "China's Spiritual Need and Claims") soon led to her volunteering to join the largest party of Protestant missionaries to ever yet set sail for China, the Lammermuir Party, in 1866.

In China, she dressed in Chinese clothes along with the rest of the China Inland Mission (CIM) missionaries, including all of the single women. Blatchley was a governess for the Taylor children: Grace Dyer Taylor, Herbert Hudson Taylor, Frederick Howard Taylor, and Samuel Dyer Taylor. She taught them daily lessons and freed Maria Taylor to participate in more missionary work with her husband. She was also the "right hand secretary" of the mission and took charge of much of the correspondence with William Thomas Berger at the home headquarters in England.

Blatchley traveled with the Taylors as a fellow pioneer missionary and survived the Yangzhou riot in 1868. She struggled with tuberculosis throughout the last period of her life. In 1870, at the request of Hudson and Maria Taylor, she chaperoned the Taylor children back to England for their own health and safety; she also assumed many responsibilities of an acting home-director (a "guardian secretary") in England of the China Inland Mission while Taylor was still in China.

After the death of Maria Taylor (from tuberculosis) she once privately hoped that Taylor would seek her hand in marriage. However, her health deteriorated and she died of the same illness as her friend in 1874. She died on July 26, 1874, and was buried in the eastern side of Highgate Cemetery on one of the narrower north/south paths. The inscription on her grave (plot no.20165) has completely worn away.

== Quotations ==
Blatchley holding one of Hudson Taylor's children

From: Hudson Taylor and the China Inland Mission, Growth of a Work of God: A Quote from The Christian eulogizing Blatchley:

Emily Blatchley, though unknown to the world, was a true heroine, and an instance of this noble, Christ-like self-sacrifice for the good of others. Her memory is fragrant, for her life was consecrated to Christ and the salvation of the heathen. For his sake she took care of a little flock, the children of the Rev. J. Hudson Taylor of the China Inland Mission. She tended them in health and in sickness, at home and abroad, for years; and as long as health permitted was their only teacher. This she did to help forward the evangelisation of China, by -setting Mr. and Mrs. Taylor as free as possible for directly missionary work. Not content with caring for Mr. Taylor's children, she became a Secretary of the Mission. She wrote in its interest thousands of letters; she kept its accounts; she edited its Occasional Papers; she helped to bear its burdens; she worked long hours, and often far into the night. She not only toiled with head and hand, but with her heart too, for she prayed for the Mission. She daily remembered its missionaries by name at the Throne of Grace, and pleaded continually its cause with God. She suffered too. She `endured hardness.' when in China and on long journeys, putting up with much discomfort. She ministered to her fellow-missionaries, and nursed them when they were sick. She bore the trial of her faith and that of love as well, for in the cause of missions she sacrificed her heart's affections. And all this she did in a quiet, unpretending way, and with a calm perseverance which continued to the end of life. None could have given more to the work of God among the heathen than she did, for she gave all she had-herself.' Blessed be God for the grace bestowed upon her, and for the everlasting rest into which she has entered: for the grace which caused her to toil for Jesus, and then to sleep in Him.

Faithful friend of a feeble but heroic Mission, would that all its helpers were like-minded with thee ! Would that all those who have ministered to it of their substance had as constant a memory of its wants as thine! The China Inland Mission has no eloquent advocate of its claims. It has no denomination for its, support. It has no great names on which to rely. It is, therefore, cast the more on God, and on the faithful love and help of the comparatively few who can appreciate the simplicity, faith, and devotedness which characterise its work in the interest of China's millions. But let those few remember that it is no small honour to be enabled to recognise and minister to the Master when He appears in the garments of poverty and weakness.

Friends of the China Inland Mission, a precious helper has just been removed from our midst; let us close our ranks and seek to fill the gap. That Mission now needs our help more than ever; let us prove ourselves worthy of the occasion. Let us help the work afresh; and let us Persevere in helping it. Here, around this newly opened grave, let our interest in this work revive; and help Thou, 0 Lord! Is not Thy Name inscribed upon its banner? Is not its song Ebenezer, and-its hope Jehovahjireh? Bless, then, this Mission, and let the little one become a thousand for Thy glory's sake."

After the Lammermuir party survived two typhoons she noted:

The feeling of our hearts when the storm subsided was that we had been brought back from the verge of the grave that we might devote ourselves afresh to God. . . . May we live as those who are alive from the dead.
