= Lammermoor =

Lammermoor or Lammermuir may refer to:

- The Lammermuir or Lammermoor Hills in southern Scotland
- The Lammermoor Range of hills in southern New Zealand, named after the Scottish hills
- Lammermoor, Queensland, a locality in Central Queensland, Australia
- The Bride of Lammermoor, a novel by Sir Walter Scott
- Lucia di Lammermoor, an opera by Gaetano Donizetti based on Scott's book
- Lammermuir Party, a British group of Protestant missionaries who travelled to China in 1866 aboard the tea clipper Lammermuir, accompanied by James Hudson Taylor, the founder of the China Inland Mission.
