= Faulding =

Faulding may refer to:

- F. H. Faulding & Co
- Faulding Florey Medal
- Jennie Faulding Taylor born Jane Elizabeth Faulding
- William Faulding Scammell (1920–2001), 11th Chancellor of the University of Adelaide

== See also ==
- Fauld (disambiguation)
