= Herbert Hudson Taylor =

Herbert Hudson Taylor (3 April 1861 – 6 June 1950), British Protestant Christian missionary to China, author, speaker and eldest son of James Hudson Taylor, founder of the China Inland Mission and Maria Jane Dyer. He served there for over 50 years – the last three as one of the prisoners of the Japanese at the Weihsien internment camp during World War II along with Eric Liddell and 1500 others.

Herbert Taylor was four when his father founded the China Inland Mission. He had been born in London during his parents’ first furlough in England together. At the time of his birth, they were living with his aunt and uncle Amelia and Benjamin Broomhall at 63 Westbourne Grove, in Bayswater. In 1866 at the age of five Herbert and his parents, three siblings and sixteen other missionaries sailed to China aboard the Lammermuir (clipper) as part of the famous Lammermuir Party. During the four-month-long voyage the ship was nearly wrecked by two typhoons.

On arrival in China, the family adopted Chinese clothing and food and set off to find a place to establish a mission center in Zhejiang. On the way, Herbert almost drowned when he fell overboard into the Grand Canal of China during their travels. Another scare happened shortly afterward when he was bitten by a dog on the face. His sister, Grace Dyer Taylor died of meningitis near Hangzhou within the first year. When he was six the family was nearly killed by a rioting mob during the Yangzhou riot in 1868. Finally in 1870 he was sent home with his surviving siblings with Emily Blatchley to live in London, separated from his parents. His mother died in China soon after they arrived home.

Like his father, he enrolled in the Royal London Hospital medical college. After two years he decided to return to China to become one of the charter teachers at the newly founded China Inland Mission Chefoo School at (Yantai). After marrying a fellow missionary, Jeanie Gray, they endured tumultuous years in China, including the Boxer Rebellion, the fall of the Qing dynasty, the Warlord era, and the Second Sino-Japanese War (1937).

In 1930 the China Inland Mission published "Ren Ch'eng-Yüan, A Tamarisk Garden Blessed with Rain. Or the Autobiography of Pastor Ren. Translated and edited by Herbert Hudson Taylor & Marshall Broomhall."

At the age of 80 he was interned by the Japanese at the Weihsien or Weifang concentration camp after Japan had entered the war in 1941. Everyone at Weifang were liberated in 1945 by American paratroopers.

Descendants of Herbert Hudson Taylor continued his full-time ministry today in the communities in Hong Kong and Taiwan. Grandson, the late Rev. James Hudson Taylor III (1929–2009) and his son Rev. James Hudson Taylor IV in Taiwan. Another of Herbert Taylor’s grandchildren is Mary Previte who served in the New Jersey General Assembly representing the 6th legislative district from 1998 to 2006.

== See also ==
- Norman Howard Cliff

== Notes ==
=== Further reading ===
- Historical Bibliography of the China Inland Mission
