= Frederick Gough =

Frederick Gough may refer to:

- Frederick Gough (MP for Horsham) (1901–1977), British Territorial Army officer, company director and politician
- Frederick Gough, 4th Baron Calthorpe (1790–1868), British peer and MP for Hindon, and for Bramber
- Frederick Foster Gough (c. 1825–1889), Protestant Christian missionary

== See also ==
- Frederick Gough School, a community secondary school in Scunthorpe, England
