= Maria Jane Taylor =

British missionary

Maria Jane Dyer
- Maria Jane (Dyer) Taylor
- Born: 16 January 1837; Straits Settlement of Malacca
- Died: 23 July 1870 (aged 33); Zhenjiang, Qing China

Maria Jane Taylor (née Dyer, 16 January 1837 – 23 July 1870) was a British Protestant Christian missionary to China, and "Mother" of the China Inland Mission with her husband, founder James Hudson Taylor. She was a pioneer missionary and educator there for 12 years (from 1852 to 1860 and 1866 to 1870). In 1858, she married Taylor and was an invaluable assistant and influence to him. In her time with the CIM, she was instrumental in training single women to be missionaries in China, when opportunities for women to serve had been previously dependent on having a missionary husband.

== Background ==
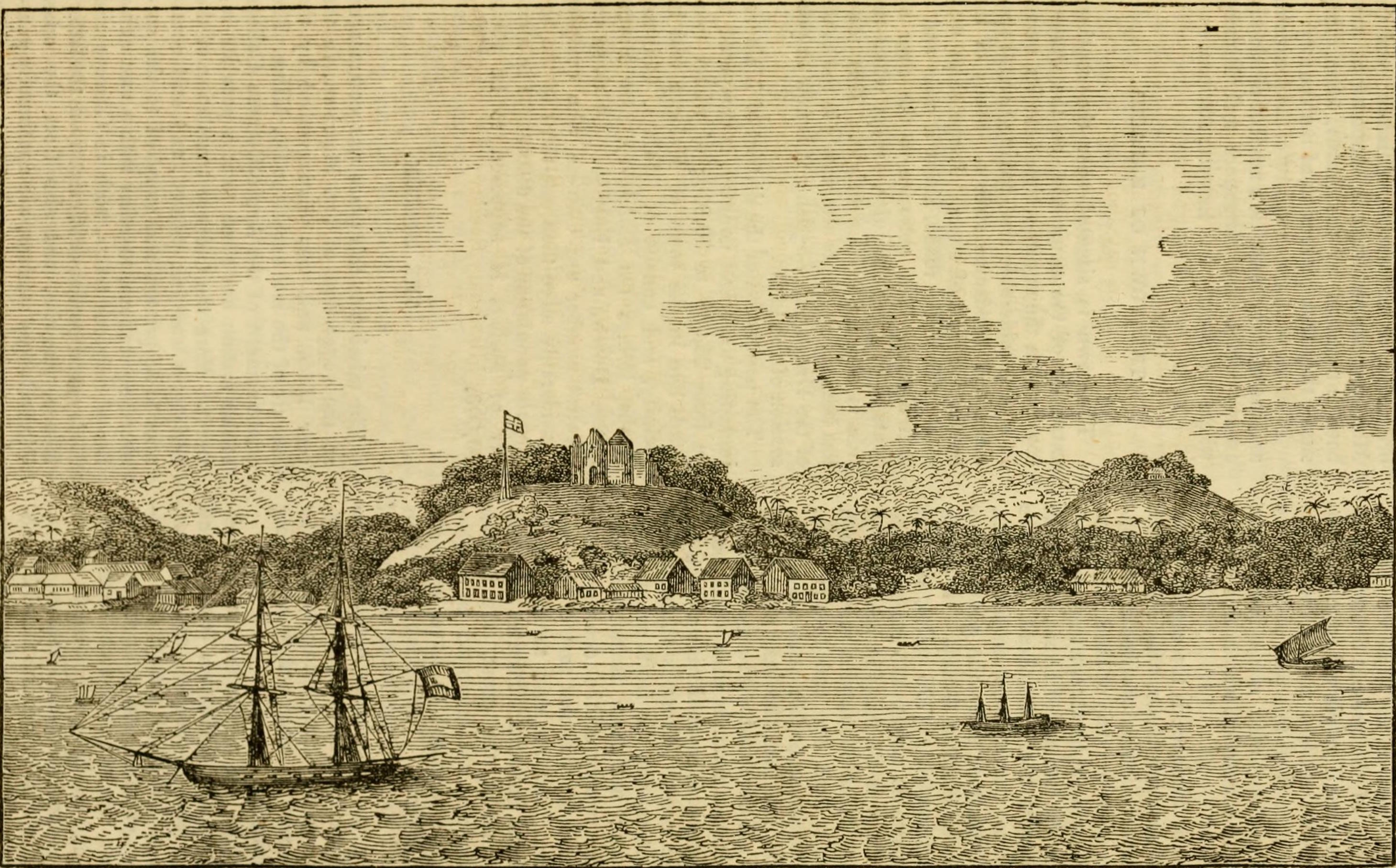
Maria Dyer was born in the British Straits Settlements of Malacca. This shows the harbor in 1831 just before she was born.

Maria & Hudson Taylor.

Maria & Hudson Taylor in 1865.

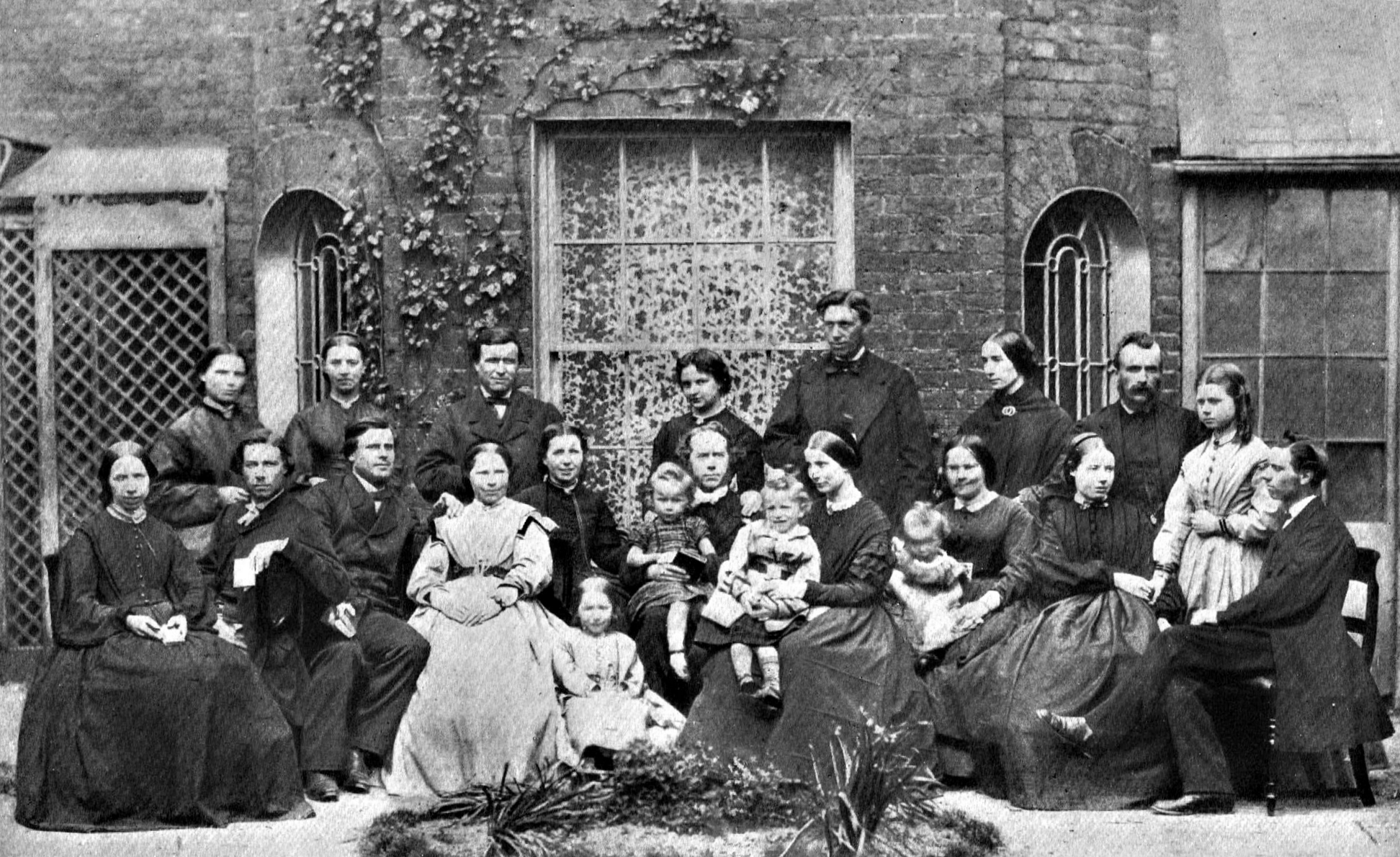
Maria and Hudson are pictured in the center of the "Lammermuir Party" photo in 1866.

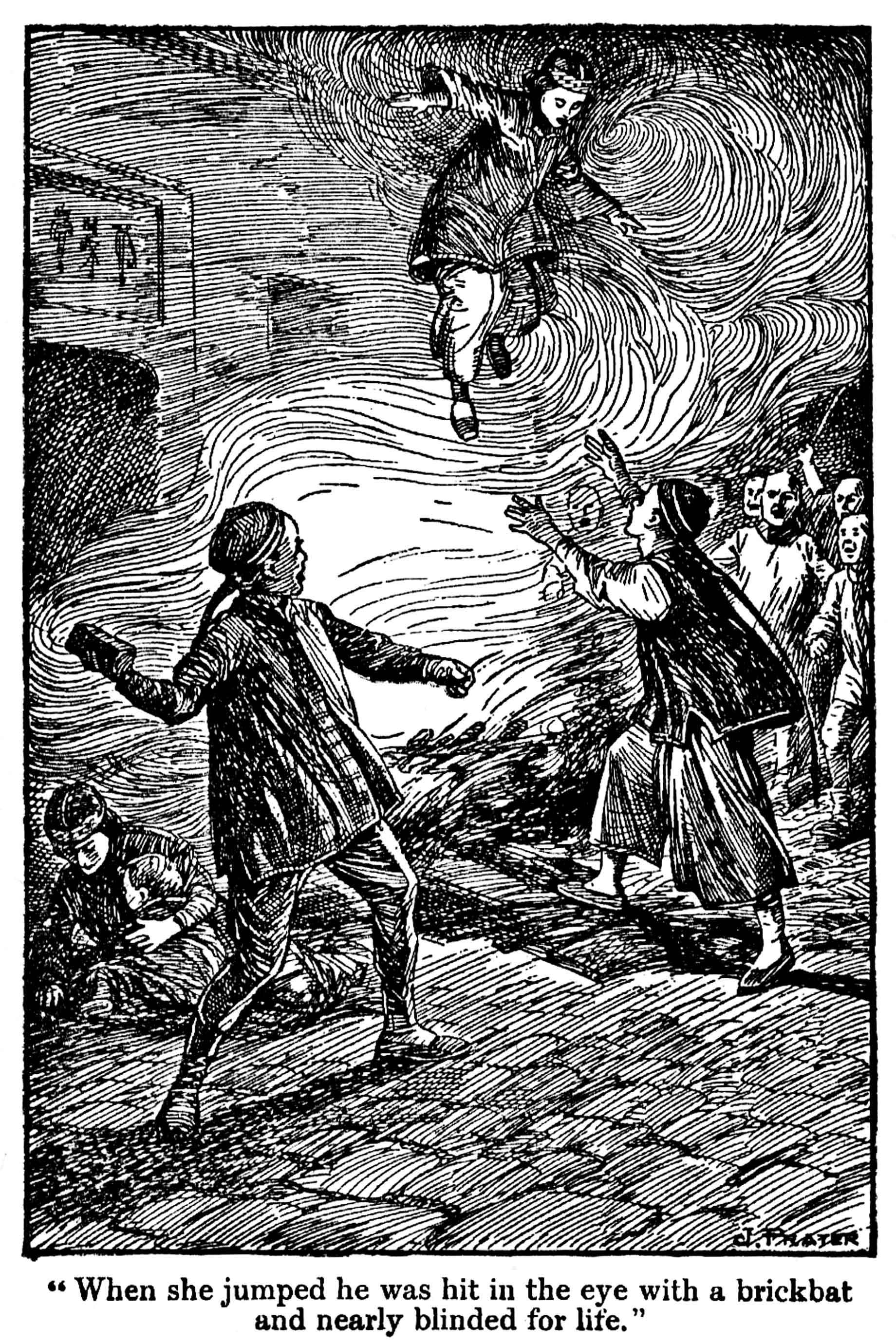
Maria jumped from the burning house in Yangzhou in 1868.

Maria was the youngest and second surviving daughter of the Rev. Samuel Dyer and his wife Maria Tarn of the London Missionary Society, who had been pioneer missionaries to the Chinese in Penang, Malaysia and Malacca, where she was born. Both of her parents died before she was ten. Born in Malacca, she did not see England until she was two years old. Even then the stay was brief and she called China her home. Her father died while away in Macau in 1843 when Maria was only six years old. Her mother married again but she also died in the mission field at Penang in 1846. Maria and her brother and sister lived in England after the death of their parents. All three children were raised in England by their mother's brother and they all eventually dedicated their adult lives to missionary work in China.

== Life in Ningbo ==
In 1853, aged 16, Maria traveled to China with her sister, Burella, and they lived and worked at a school for girls in Ningbo which was run by one of the first female missionaries to the Chinese, Mary Ann Aldersey, an old friend of their mother. It was there that she met and, in 1858, married Hudson Taylor, despite Aldersey's complete opposition.

Maria Taylor was better educated than her husband and from a different social background. She was so fluent in Ningbo that she could read a book in English and simultaneously sight-translate it for a class. Her Ningbo dialect fluency meant that she was immediately able to start a small primary school. As a married couple, the Taylors also adopted a girl called Lanfeng and took care of an adopted boy named Tianxi in Ningbo in addition to five Chinese boys that Taylor was helping. They had a baby of their own that died late in 1858. Their first surviving child, Grace Dyer Taylor, was born in 1859. Shortly after she was born, the Taylors took over all of the operations at the hospital in Ningbo that had been run by Dr. William Parker. In addition to this, they cared for a young Chinese girl named Ensing and five other Chinese boys.

In 1860, the Taylors went to England so that Hudson could regain his health. But for Maria, China was still her home.

Their second child, a son, Herbert Hudson Taylor, was born in London in 1861. More children were born to the Taylors: Frederick Howard Taylor, 1862; Samuel Dyer Taylor, 1864; and Jane Dyer Taylor, 1865 (died at birth).

In London, Maria helped Hudson to write China's Spiritual Need and Claims, which had an enormous impact on Christian missions in the 19th century.

== Return to China ==
On 26 May 1866, after over five years of working in England, Maria and Hudson Taylor and their four children set sail for China with their new team of missionaries, the Lammermuir Party, aboard the Lammermuir (clipper). The party included Jennie Faulding Taylor who was a friend of Maria's and who would go on to become Hudson's second wife. A four-month voyage was considered speedy at the time. While in the South China Sea and also the Pacific Ocean, the ship was nearly sunk but survived 2 typhoons. They arrived safely in Shanghai on 30 September 1866.

The arrival of the largest party of missionaries ever sent to China – as well as their intent to be dressed in native clothing – gave the foreign settlement in Shanghai much to talk about and some criticism began for the young China Inland Mission. The party donned Chinese clothing—even the women missionaries (Maria for the first time)—which was deemed semi-scandalous by some Europeans. They traveled down the Grand Canal to make the first settlement in the war-torn city of Hangzhou. Another daughter was born to them in China (Maria Hudson Taylor).

Their eldest daughter, Grace, died during their first year in China. Maria felt the loss deeply, and poured out her emotions in poetry, as she had done earlier in life after the death of her parents.

Amid the struggle of the first year back in China, she wrote:

As to the harsh judgings of the world, or the more painful misunderstandings of Christian brethren, I generally feel that the best plan is to go on with our work and leave God to vindicate our cause.

When young women CIM missionary recruits arrived to join the work in China, Maria was able to train them in understanding Chinese, adaptation to Chinese culture, and missionary work.

The year 1868 brought another child (Charles Edward Taylor) to the Taylor family, and, in 1870, Hudson and Maria made the difficult decision to send their older three surviving children (Bertie, Freddie, and Maria – Samuel died earlier that year) home to England. That same year, Noel was born, though he died of malnutrition and deprivation two weeks later due to Maria's inability to nurse him. Maria died several days later at their home in Zhenjiang, with the official cause of death being cholera. The small Protestant cemetery where she was buried in Zhenjiang was where Hudson wanted to be laid to rest as well. He followed her there in 1905. The cemetery itself was destroyed during the Chinese Cultural Revolution by Red Guards in China as part of the Destruction of the Four Olds campaign. Today there are industrial buildings over the site.

Maria's death shook Hudson Taylor deeply, and in 1871 with his own health deteriorating, he returned to England to recuperate and take care of business items involved with the mission work; it was during this trip that he married Jennie Faulding.

Of Maria's and Hudson's nine children, three died at birth and two in childhood. The four who reached adulthood all later became missionaries with the China Inland Mission. In 1897 Hudson's and Maria's only surviving daughter, Maria Hudson Taylor, the wife of John Joseph Coulthard, died in Wenzhou, leaving four little children and her husband in sorrow. She had been instrumental in leading many Chinese women to Christianity during her short life.

== Epitaph ==
Her marker read:

SACRED TO THE MEMORY OF MARIA JANE,
THE BELOVED WIFE OF THE REV. J. HUDSON TAYLOR,
OF THE CHINA INLAND MISSION,
AND DAUGHTER OF THE LATE REV. SAMUEL DYER OF PENANG.
SHE WAS BORN IN MALACCA JAN. 16TH 1837,
ARRIVED IN CHINA IN 1852,
AND FELL ASLEEP IN JESUS IN CHINKIANG JULY 23RD 1870.
AN EARNEST CHRISTIAN AND DEVOTED MISSIONARY,
A FAITHFUL AND AFFECTIONATE WIFE AND TENDER MOTHER,
A SINCERE AND WARM HEARTED FRIEND,
TO HER TO LIVE WAS CHRIST, AND TO DIE WAS GAIN,
HER MEMORY IS EMBALMED
IN THE HEARTS OF THOSE WHO KNEW AND LOVED HER.
‘FATHER, I WILL THAT THEY ALSO WHOM THOU HAST GIVEN ME
BE WITH ME WHERE I AM’
ALSO OF THE FOLLOWING CHILDREN OF THE ABOVE,
JANE DYER TAYLOR
BORN AND DIED IN ENGLAND IN 1865,
GRACE DYER TAYLOR
BORN IN NINGBO JULY 31ST 1859 DIED AT HANGCHAU AUG. 23RD 1867,
SAML. DYER TAYLOR
BORN IN ENGLAND JUNE 24TH 1864, DIED AT CHINKIANG FEB. 4TH 1870,
NOEL TAYLOR
BORN IN CHINKIANG JULY 7TH, DIED JULY 20TH 1870
‘SUFFER THE LITTLE CHILDREN TO COME UNTO ME’

== Legacy ==
Descendants of Hudson & Maria Taylor continued their full-time ministry in Chinese communities in Hong Kong and Taiwan including Rev. James Hudson Taylor III (戴紹曾牧師) and his son Rev. James Hudson Taylor IV (戴繼宗牧師).

=== Writing ===
- Siao Veng-teh [Little Catechism] (in Wu), Ningbo: unknown, 1860, pp. 36. This small work contains elements of Christian teaching in catechismal form, divided into seven sections.

== Chronology ==
Early Years and Orphanhood

- 1837 Maria Jane Dyer born in Malacca
- 1839 Arrives in England with parents, Samuel and Burella
- 1841 Leaves for Singapore with parents, Samuel, Burella and Miss Buckland
- 1842 Arrives in Singapore with parents who rent the mission-house of American Board of Commissioners for Foreign Missions (Memoir p 240); Ebenezer, baby brother, born (Memoir p 232, 235)
- 1843 Father leaves with John Stronach for London Missionary Society Conference in Hong Kong; Father dies in Macau (Maria is 6 years of age)
- 1844 Moves with her mother, Samuel and Burella to Penang; Mother takes over Chinese Girls' School for which her father had bequeathed money. There was no talk of the family returning to Britain (Not Less Than p 25)
- 1845 Mother marries Johann Georg Bausum, a German missionary based in Penang
- 1846 Mother dies in Penang (Maria is 9 years of age)

England and China

- 1847 Goes to England with Samuel and Burella in care of guardian, William Tarn (uncle); Enters Polam Hall School in Darlington, Durham, NE England with Burella
- 1852 Leaves England (at age 15) with Burella (age 17) with Mr. & Mrs. Cobbold (Church Missionary Society) for Mary Ann Aldersey's girls' school in Ningbo;
- 1853 Arrives in Shanghai; goes on to Ningbo to teach in Mary Ann Aldersey's Girls' School
- 1854 Hudson Taylor arrives in China
- 1856 Meets Hudson Taylor the day after his arrival in Ningbo; Declines Robert Hart's proposal
- 1857 Mary Ann Aldersey forces Maria to decline Taylor's proposal

Maria receives guardian's approval to marry Taylor

Married Life

- 1858 Married to James Hudson Taylor at Presbyterian Compound, Ningbo; Sister, Burella dies of cholera in Shanghai, age: 23 years; Brother, Samuel Jr. emigrates to New Zealand
- Baby Taylor born and died in Ningbo Mission House, "Wu-gyiao-deo" Lake Head or Bridge Street, Ningbo
- 1859 Grace "Gracie" Dyer Taylor born in Ningbo Mission House, "Wu-gyiao-deo" Lake Head or Bridge Street, Ningbo
- Moved to Dr. William Parker's hospital, outside Salt Gate, Ningbo
- Ensing adopted, before 1860 in Ningbo
- 5 Chinese boys adopted, before June 1860 in Ningbo, Zhejiang, China
- 1860 Taylors moved for 2 weeks, to home of John Shaw Burdon, Shanghai

Life in London 1860 to 1866

- Sailed to England (via Cape of Good Hope) on furlough aboard the tea clipper Jubilee, with Hudson, Grace and Wang Laijun
- The Jubilee arrived, 20 November 1860, in Gravesend, England
- Settled at 63 Westbourne Grove, Bayswater, London
- 1861 Herbert "Bertie" Hudson Taylor born at 63 Westbourne Grove, Bayswater, London
- Moved, to 1 Beaumont Street, London
- 1862 Frederick "Freddie" Howard Taylor born at 1 Beaumont Street, London
- 1864 Samuel "Sammie" Dyer Taylor born in Barnsley, Yorkshire, England
- Moved to 30 Coborn Street, London
- 1865 Assisted in the writing of "China: Its Spiritual Need and Claims" with Hudson Taylor, in London
- Daughter Jane Dyer Taylor died at birth at 30 Coborn Street, London

Return to China 1866 to 1871

- 1866 Sailed to China (via the Cape of Good Hope) aboard the tea clipper Lammermuir with Hudson and four children, in East India Docks, London
- Arrived in China aboard the Lammermuir, 29 September 1866, in Shanghai, China
- Settled with the Lammermuir party, December 1866 in 1 Xin Kai Long (New Lane), Hangzhou, Zhejiang, China
- 1867 Maria "Marie" Hudson Taylor born in 1 Xin Kai Long (New Lane), Hangzhou
- Daughter Grace Dyer Taylor died, 23 August 1867, in temple at Pengshan, near Hangzhou
- 1868 Moved with Hudson in Yangzhou, Jiangsu, China
- Survived Yangzhou riot
- Moved with Hudson, to Zhenjiang, Jiangsu, China
- Moved with Hudson in Yangzhou
- Charles Edward Taylor born in Yangzhou, Jiangsu, China
- 1869 Moved with Hudson to Ningbo Mission House, "Wu-gyiao-deo" Lake Head or Bridge Street, Ningbo, Zhejiang, China
- Family holiday with Hudson in Putuo Island, Zhejiang, China
- 1870 Son Samuel Dyer Taylor died aboard a boat in the Yangtze River near Zhenjiang, Jiangsu, China
- Moved with Hudson to Zhenjiang
- Noel Taylor born in Zhenjiang
- Son Noel died 13 days after birth in Zhenjiang
- Maria Jane (Dyer) Taylor died in Zhenjiang

== See also ==
- List of China Inland Mission missionaries in China
- Sir Robert Hart, 1st Baronet who proposed to marry her in 1858 before Hudson Taylor

=== Further reading ===
- Historical Bibliography of the China Inland Mission
