= Lammermuir Party =

British group of Protestant missionaries to China

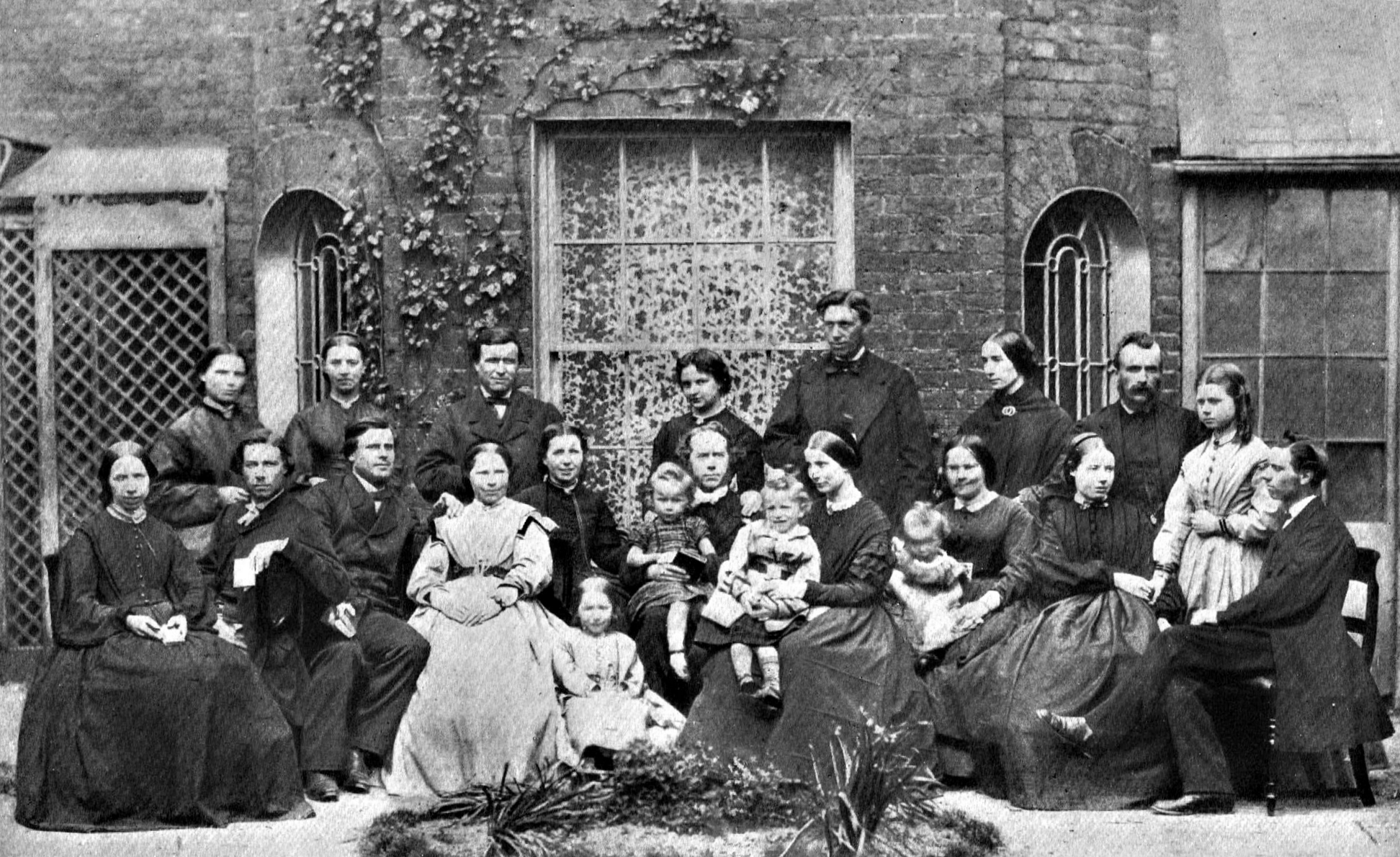
The Lammermuir Party. Standing, from left to right: Jane MacLean, Susan Barnes, James Williamson, Emily Blatchley, George Duncan, Louise Desgraz, John Robert Sell, Mary Elizabeth Bausam. Sitting, from left to right: Elizabeth Rose, William David Rudland, Lewis Nichol, Eliza Nichol, Jane Elizabeth Faulding, James Hudson Taylor, Maria Jane Taylor, the four Taylor children (Grace Dyer kneeling, Herbert Hudson, Frederick Howard, and Samuel Dyer seated on Mary Bell's lap), Mary Bell, Mary Bowyer, Josiah Alexander Jackson.

The Lammermuir Party was a British group of 18 Protestant missionaries and four children who travelled to China in 1866 aboard the tea clipper Lammermuir.

== Overview ==
The party was led by Hudson Taylor, the founder of the China Inland Mission (CIM). Historians have cited this event as a turning point in the history of Protestant missionary work in China in the 19th century. This was the largest group of Protestant missionaries to date to arrive at one time to China. Moreover they were atypical of missionaries. None of the members of the party was an ordained minister; only two had any previous overseas experience; and most came from the British working class. Among them were nine unmarried women traveling to a place where single European women were rare. Taylor required the CIM missionaries, both male and female, to dress in Chinese fashion which was much derided by the foreign community living in China.

The accomplishments of the Lammermuir Party were more symbolic than quantifiable. Many of the missionaries died or left the CIM shortly, and dissention among its members caused problems. However, the Lammermuir Party was prominent in the public eye and inspired a much larger effort on the part of Christian missionaries to work in China and attempt to convert Chinese to Christianity. The CIM became the largest Protestant missionary organization in China.

== Voyage on Lammermuir ==
On 26 May 1866, 34 sailors, 18 missionaries and four children boarded the Lammermuir, which lay tied up at London's East India Docks. Lammermuir was a two-year-old clipper ship with three masts and square-rigged sails. Grace Stott was to have sailed, but she was left behind for medical reasons. A voyage halfway around the world would take four months; a fast trip compared to the six-month duration of some of the older ships of the previous decade.

Henry Grattan Guinness wrote a hymn in honor of their departure that echoed Taylor's 1865 book China's Spiritual Need and Claims:

Over the dark blue sea, over the trackless flood,

A little band is gone in the service of their God;
The lonely waste of waters they traverse to proclaim
In the distant land of Sinim, Immanuel’s saving Name.
They have heard from the far-off East the voice of their brothers’ blood:

A million a month in China are dying without God.

The Lammermuir was nearly wrecked by two typhoons before limping into the Shanghai harbour in late September.

Taylor recalls the most perilous time in the voyage:

The appearance of things was now truly terrific. Rolling fearfully, the masts and yards hanging down were tearing our only sail... and battering like a ram against the main yard. The deck from forecastle to poop was one scarcely broken sea. The roar of the water, the clanging of chains, the beating of the dangling masts and yards, the sharp smack of the torn sails made it almost impossible to hear any orders that might be given.

Taylor writes after twelve days of this experience:

And for three days after that the danger only increased, as the ship was making water fast. Fires were all out and cooking was impossible. For a time no drinking water was obtainable, and the women as well as the men worked at the pumps. But through it all prayer was so wonderfully answered that no lives were lost or serious injuries sustained.

The badly damaged ship caused a local stir in Shanghai. Emily Blatchley notes:

Our broken and dismantled condition made us an object of general curiosity; but we, in our hearts, thanked GOD for the great deliverance He had wrought for us in sparing the lives of all on board in such unusual peril-peril arising not only from the oversweeping waters themselves, but from the frequent falling of splintered yards, etc. But although Mr. Taylor had plenty of surgical practice with severe bruises and such-like hurts, not one life was lost, nor were any limbs broken. It is needless to say there were many narrow escapes. A vessel came in soon after we did, which had passed through the same typhoon, but only six lives remained out of twenty-two; sixteen had been drowned! It was well that we got in on the day we did, for they had some terribly stiff gales outside, which in our disabled condition we could scarcely have weathered.

== Dissention ==
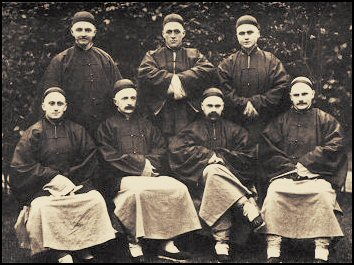
CIM missionaries in China dress.

Troubles for Taylor began during the ocean voyage. Prior to the arrival of the Lammermuir Party in China, missionaries in China were ordained and usually well-educated. The missionaries on the Lammermuir were not ordained, and most were from the British working-class. For example, Jackson was a carpenter, Nicol was a blacksmith, and Duncan was a mason. During the ocean voyage, those three had complained that the clothing Taylor provided to them was inferior to that given Presbyterian missionaries going to China.

On their arrival in Shanghai, described as an "unlovely place...on the edge of alluvial mud flats", the foreign community was scandalized by the intent of Taylor and the CIM missionaries to wear Chinese clothing and embark into the interior of China with single women. This led to the CIM being derisively referred to as "The Pigtail Mission". Chinese men customarily had their hair braided. Taylor had the heads of the men partially shaven, and they were given an artificial pigtail until such time as their hair grew long enough to form a natural pigtail. The North China Herald raged about the "cruelty of forcing foreign women to wear Chinese gowns" and called Taylor "either a fool or a knave." Taylor's belief was that the Christianity being dispensed to the Chinese by missionaries had a cultural gap that would not be bridged unless missionaries looked and acted more like Chinese. He was influenced in this by the legacy of pioneering German missionary Karl Gützlaff, and over time more and more missionaries would come to agree with him.

The Lammermuir Party had been welcomed to Shanghai by Anglican missionary George Moule, but Moule quickly turned against Taylor. Moule believed that wearing of Chinese clothing by missionaries was inappropriate and that the shared quarters of Taylor and the unmarried women in the Lammermuir Party was scandalous. A year after the arrival of the party, the North China Herald proclaimed, "This happy family has, we learn, exploded. The ladies were required to dress in Chinese costume and eat chow-chow, and rebelled against both edicts." In 1868, five members of the Lammermuir Party resigned or were dismissed. The survivors, also decimated by several deaths, reaffirmed their adherence to Taylor's rules.

== Members ==
Maria & Hudson Taylor in 1865

- James Hudson Taylor (1832-1905)
- Mrs. Maria Jane Taylor (Maria Jane Dyer) (1837-1870) (died of cholera)
  - Grace Dyer Taylor (1859-1867), (died of meningitis)
  - Herbert Hudson Taylor (1861-1950)
  - Frederick Howard Taylor (1862-1946)
  - Samuel Dyer Taylor (1864-1870), (died of tuberculosis)
- Lewis Nicol, Arbroath, Aberdeen (c. 1842-1910), blacksmith. 1867 Xiaoshan outrage, sent back to England. 1868 dismissed from CIM.
- Mrs. Eliza Calder Nicol, Aberdeen c. 1840-1909), wife of Lewis Nicol. Dismissed from CIM.
- George Duncan, Banff, Scotland (died 1873), stonemason. Assigned to Nanking & Tsing-kiangpu (traditional spelling). Married Catherine, 1868 in Shanghai.
- Josiah Alexander Jackson (died 1909), Kingsland, carpenter/draper. Assigned to Taizchou and Wenzchou. Married Francis Wilson (also a CIM missionary) in 1872. They had a daughter Emily. Francis died 1878. Jackson returned to England for the first time in 14 years. Married Francis Hine in 1881. She died in China 1882. Jackson left CIM 1884. Returned to Shanghai as a hotel proprietor, married Sarah Gatrell in 1898. Died in Shanghai, China.
- William David Rudland, Little Eversden (1839-1912), blacksmith, evangelist, supervised printing press. Translated New Testament and most of the Old testament to the Romanized Taizchou dialect. Last surviving adult member of the Lammermuir Party. Daughter Grace joined CIM 1895 in China.
- John Robert Sell, Romford (died 1867) (died of smallpox in the first year)
- James Williamson, Arbroath (died 1896), carpenter. married his sweetheart 1873 in Scotland. died in Scotland. His daughter Mary joined C.I.M. in 1896 in China.
- Susan Barnes, Limerick, Resigned from C.I.M. to join London Missionary Society, 1868.
- Mary Elizabeth Bausum, Walthamstow, step-sister of Maria Taylor, on her way to join their mother, Mrs. Lord in Ningpo. m. Dr. Stephen Barchett in 1868.
- Emily Blatchley (1842-1874), London, Secretary to Hudson Taylor, Editor of the Occasional Papers, and governess for the Taylor children. Died in London from tuberculosis.
- Mary Bell (1844-1874), [Great Waltham, Essex], Governess for the Taylor children on board ship and in China. m. William D. Rudland, 25 December 1867. Her work with women in the Taizhou district opened doors to the district expansion. She died in London from remittent fever.
- Mary Bowyer (?-1909), Mildmay-London, worked at school in Hangzchou. m.F.W. Baller, 1875.
- Louise Desgraz (?-1907, Liverpool & Switzerland, Started a children's home in Hangzchou. She adopted several abandoned children using her own funds. m. Edward Tomalin, 1878. She directed the Chefoo school. Died in China.
- Jane Elizabeth Faulding (1843-1904), London. Started a school near Hangzchou. m. Hudson Taylor 1871. Died in Switzerland.
- Jane McLean, Inverness. Engaged to John Sell in 1867. After his death she resigned CIM in 1868 to join London Missionary Society in Shanghai.
- Elisabeth Rose, Barnsley (?-1890), joined the group to marry James Meadows. m.1866. Daughters Louise joined C.I.M. in 1893 and Minnie joined C.I.M. in 1895.

== Legacy ==
The attrition rate of the Landermuir Party was high. By 1875, of the 18 missionaries and four children in the original party, Taylor and his second wife were back in England because of his poor health and two of his four children were dead. Five of the 18 missionaries had died of disease, two had been dismissed, and three had left the China Inland Mission. Only eight out of the 18 remained in China, although Taylor and wife would soon return. The Landermuir Party was soon augmented by additional CIM missionaries. By 1875, CIM had sent 53 missionaries to China but only 22 remained. Of those, Taylor said "only four of five men and three or four women were much good...some lack ability, others reliability."

Failures and attrition notwithstanding, Taylor's message that "a million a month in China are dying without God," ignited a missionary movement in Britain and America that saw men and women rush to China for romance, sacrifice, and danger as well as Christian piety. Within a few years, "the evangelization of the world in this generation" would become the watchwords of an ambitious missionary effort to conquer China for Christianity. By the time of Taylor's death in 1905, CIM would have 825 missionaries in China scattered throughout all eighteen provinces of the country.

== Chronology of voyage ==
- 26 May 1866: Depart East India Docks, London
- Last sight of England is Start Point lighthouse, Devon
- 3 June: near Cape Finisterre
- 12 June: near Canary Islands
- 18 June: near Cape Verde Islands
- June Atlantic Ocean doldrums
- c. 7 July: near Trinidad Island
- pass The Great Tea Race of 1866 Fiery Cross, Taeping, Ariel, Serica, and Taitsing (later 3 others) bound for London
- pass Belted Will, Flying Spur bound for London
- sight Cape Town lighthouse
- pass the Min and Falcon bound for London
- conversion of many of crew to Christianity
- 3 August: early morning Taylor wakes several to tell of First Mate Brunton's conversion
- 4 August: heavy seas–sternsail boom breaks and hits William Carron. Jennie Faulding talks with Grace Taylor and it is evident that she has had a Christian conversion experience
- c. 14 August: near Amsterdam Island
- sight flying fish in Indian Ocean
- 27 August: Sunda Strait past Mt. Krakatoa
- 28 August: Anjer Roads, Java: shore leave & baptism service
- 31 August: Selat Gelasa (Gaspar Strait), past wrecks of other ships including the first Lammermuir, wrecked in 1863
- 1 September: South China Sea cross Equator
- 10 September–14 September: first typhoon in the East China Sea
- 14 September–19 September: stormy detour around Taiwan
- 18 September: near Fujian coast
- 20 September–24 September: second typhoon in Pacific Ocean nearly wrecks the ship
- 21 September: bulwarks gone
- 22 September: all three topmasts gone
- 23 September: Hudson Taylor kisses children and then goes out in storm to help crew
- 28 September: near Ma-an Liedao (Saddle Islands)
- 29 September: The Lammermuir arrives near Wusong, China
- 30 September 1866: arrives Shanghai
