= Frederick Howard Taylor =

British pioneer Protestant Christian missionary

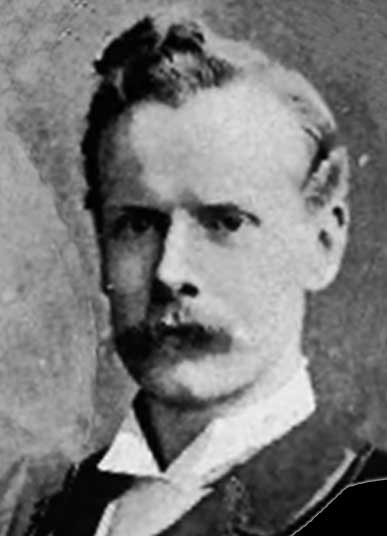
- Missionary to China and Author
- Born: 25 November 1862; London, England
- Died: 15 August 1946 (aged 83); Tunbridge Wells, Kent England
- Education: Royal College of Surgeons
- Title: MRCS
- Spouse: Mary Geraldine Guinness (m. 1894)
- Parents: Hudson Taylor; Maria Jane Taylor

Frederick Howard Taylor a.k.a. F. Howard Taylor (25 November 1862 – 15 August 1946), was a British pioneer Protestant Christian missionary to China, author, speaker and second son of James Hudson Taylor, founder of the China Inland Mission, and Maria Jane Dyer.

== Beginnings ==
Howard and Geraldine in Chinese Dress

Howard Taylor was three when his father founded the China Inland Mission. He was born in London during his parents’ first furlough in England together. He was named after his parents' friend and fellow missionary Frederick Foster Gough. In 1866 at the age of four he was taken with his parents, 3 siblings and sixteen other missionaries to China aboard the Lammermuir (clipper) as part of the famous Lammermuir Party. During the 4-month long voyage the ship was nearly wrecked by 2 typhoons. His sister, Grace Dyer Taylor, died of meningitis the first year. When he was six the family was nearly killed by a rioting mob during the Yangzhou riot in 1868. Finally in 1870 he was sent home with his surviving siblings with Emily Blatchley to live in London, separated from his parents. His mother died in China soon after they arrived home in 1870.

Like his father, he enrolled in the Royal London Hospital medical college, completing his diploma in 1888. Hudson Taylor lived to see his son, Howard, follow in his footsteps to become a medical missionary to China. He received a Doctor of Medicine from London University and subsequently became a Fellow of the Royal College of Surgeons as well as a Member of the Royal College of Physicians. He was an extremely capable student and received three high honors in his postgraduate studies.

Howard Taylor always had a close relationship with his father. 1888 was a special year for both men. Hudson Taylor was on his first tour in North America sharing the missionary needs in China. Howard Taylor had taken three months leave to go along, having just ended his year of medical and surgical appointments. Howard Taylor showed a deep interest to go to China long term. Hearing his father speak at various meetings, particularly to young students, had a profound influence on Howard. On 15 October 1889, at a Missionary Convention organized by the Students Foreign Missionary Union more than 1500 students attended. Of these, 152 signed the pledge, "it is my earnest hope, if God permit, to engage in foreign missionary work." The first name in the book of members reads, " Taylor, F Howard, MD, MRCP, FRCS (England), the London Hospital."

He later noted:

It was suggested by some of my fellow students that I was taking a rash step, that I was perhaps making a mistake in going and burying myself, as they said, amongst the heathen of China. I did not think so; I did not believe that any one who undertook to go forth and serve the Lord Jesus Christ would be found in the long run to be making a mistake, and I am thankful to be able to say now that it is better than I hoped.

On 3 November 1889 Howard Taylor, accompanying his father, arrived at Gothenburg, where they were met by Mr. Josef Holmgren, the Secretary of the Swedish Mission in China, who invited them over for special meetings to mobilize the Swedish Christians for China. He had arranged the whole of their tour and was their companion and interpreter throughout the trip. Twenty towns were visited, including Stockholm, Uppsala and Christiania, and 50-60,000 people were addressed, even Queen Sophia invited Mr. Taylor to a private audience in Stockholm. Hudson Taylor was already 57 at that time, and no longer enjoying the same vigor as his son. Yet his insistence on traveling third class and carrying his own suitcase continued to give the young soon-to-be missionary a model of servanthood.

Howard Taylor departed for China on 23 January 1890 from England as a single man. On 24 April 1894 he married Mary Geraldine Guinness, a childhood friend from his youth in Bromley-by-Bow in the East End of London. Her father was Henry Grattan Guinness, the famous evangelist and preacher. He was sent to Henan and his leadership was displayed with the opening of the ministry in the province, including the significant medical work which continued into the next 30 years. Howard was the first missionary to visit Zhengzhou in Henan. As such, he was the only trained physician south of the Yellow River among 20 million Chinese. In the spring of 1895 a mission station was opened as the result of the medical work for the previous three years at the invitation of Yuan Shikai, a rising political figure who later became President of China. Yuan, from Henan himself, called Howard Taylor one day to attend to his mother, dying of cancer. In recognition of his service, Li Hongzhang presented Howard Taylor with an honorific tablet.

Howard spoke with strong convictions about what he believed to be his calling:

We were sent to work in a new district. In the providence of God we had the privilege of opening up two new stations - the city of Zhengzhou and the adjoining city, one day's journey away, of Taikang. We were the first missionaries to reside at these places, hence, speaking broadly, none of the people knew intelligently about the Lord Jesus Christ. Of course the very foundations of the work had to be laid, and they were laid, and laid deeply, at some cost. The medical work was a means which the Lord used very greatly in enabling us to get at the hearts and the affections of the people in those two cities and the surrounding districts. The work, of course, was of a very varied nature- a great many minor cases, a considerable sprinkling of major cases that required great thought and care and much prayer, for the danger of failure can hardly be over-estimated. If we undertook to operate, for instance, on a case of cataract, and failed, it would very likely go abroad that we had taken away the patient’s eye or the patient’s sight- something out of the patient’s eye in order to make medicine, and the result might be that our lives would pay the forfeit. Such work is always carried on at considerable cost.

Together Howard Taylor and his wife authored several books:

== Published works ==
- These Forty Years 1908
- Hudson Taylor and The China Inland Mission Vol. 1 Hudson Taylor in Early Years: The Growth of a Soul 1911
- Hudson Taylor and The China Inland Mission Vol. 2 The Growth of a Work of God 1918
- Hudson Taylor's Spiritual Secret 1932

== Continued service ==
Mary Geraldine Guinness was a noteworthy missionary in her own right with a love of writing. She joined the CIM in 1888 and became one of the key biographers for the CIM. She served in Hunan before they were married. She was already the author of a few books including "The Story of the China Inland Mission" and "In the Far East".

Howard Taylor took risks to serve the mission in China. In 1898, for nine months he was acting superintendent in Henan while suffering from intractable dysentery. When he asked to be replaced and freed to get proper treatment, his father, Hudson Taylor, confessed that he had no one available to take over. He urged Howard to stay on and Howard Taylor did.

In 1901, when the Student Volunteer Movement invited Howard Taylor and his wife to be the speakers among the colleges and universities. Ten years after his service began in China, in 1900, he and his wife made a special tour of the American colleges, again at the invitation of the Student volunteer Missionary Union. This was considered one of the most notable campaigns ever conducted among North American institutions by secretaries of the Student Volunteer Movement on overseas missions. They began the mobilization tour in November 1900, continuing with some interruptions, until April 1901.

In less than 5 months, between November 1900 and April 1901, Dr Howard Taylor visited 77 different institutions of learning, including 40 medical schools, 10 theological seminaries, 21 universities and colleges, and six other schools. His aim was to present to medical students the opportunities for service on the mission field, so that only those other colleges could be visited that were in or near the largest cities. This work necessitated about 4000 miles of travel, as far north as Montreal and Minneapolis, and as far south as Baltimore and Nashville. Mrs. Taylor went to the women’s colleges of the eastern states. By January they were traveling together on Canadian and western tours. In all, Mrs. Taylor visited nearly as many institutions as did her husband. Their contribution was so much appreciated that the Student Volunteer Movement invited them to become traveling speakers for a whole year in 1912.

On Saturday, 3 June 1905, Howard and Geraldine were there when Hudson Taylor died at Changsha. They had been traveling with him since April visiting the different mission stations along the Yangtze, calling at various ports, to Hankow, then by rail into Henan, and finally to Changsha, the capital of Hunan. At the memorial service held at the China Inland Mission Hall in Shanghai on 13 June, Dr. Howard Taylor spoke about his father’s life, quoting from Hudson Taylor and how his father constantly challenged him,

Does it not say that we ought to lay down our lives for the [Chinese] brethen?

In February 1922, Howard and his wife were kidnapped by a bandit leader in Yunnan named Pu Shuming. They were subsequently released. Geraldine recorded the events of the ordeal in "With P’u and His Brigands".

Howard spoke about medical missionary work in China:

The first then, and incomparably the most important qualification for Medical missionary service is love; love that can be felt, that practises as well as preaches.
