= Evan Davies (missionary) =

Welsh Protestant Christian missionary

Evan Davies (1805 – 18 June 1864) was a Welsh Protestant Christian missionary in the Congregationalist tradition. He served with the London Missionary Society and worked among the Chinese in Malaysia in Penang.

Davies was born in Hengwm, Lledrod, Cardiganshire, Wales. He was educated at the academy at Neuaddlwyd and also at the Western Academy at Exeter. After completing college, he settled at Great Torrington, Devonshire. In 1835 he was ordained at Wycliffe Chapel, London and commissioned to be a missionary to the Chinese. He and his wife and a Rev. S. Wolfe sailed for the "British Straits Settlements" aboard the Duke of Sussex on 8 May that year. They arrived at Penang on 11 September.

He served alongside other pioneer missionaries such as Samuel Dyer and his wife, Maria (Tarn) Dyer. Davies established a boarding school for Chinese boys and trained them in the English language as well as other "European instruction". After serving as a missionary in Penang for four years, failing health caused him to travel to Singapore in 1839 and in September of that year returned to England aboard the Appoline with his wife and children. They arrived in London on 13 February 1840.

Back in England he was appointed to be inspector of the Missionary School at Walthamstow in 1842. In 1844 he moved to Richmond, Surrey where he served as pastor of the Congregational church for 13 years.

Davies' impact on Christian missionary work in China is often understated. His book "China and Her Spiritual Claims" (1845) was a blueprint in many ways for the book by Hudson Taylor, China's Spiritual Need and Claims, which moved hundreds to pursue missionary work in China, especially for the China Inland Mission.

He died at Llanstephan, near Carmarthen. Davies lies buried at Abney Park Cemetery in London.

== Works authored or edited ==
- An appeal to Reason and Good Conscience of Catholics
- China and Her Spiritual Claims (1845)
- Memoirs of Rev. Samuel Dyer; London : Snow, 1846
- Letters of Rev. Samuel Dyer to his children (Ed. By Evan Davies) (1847)
- Rest. Lectures on the Sabbath
- Lectures on Christian Theology (2 vols.) (1850) by George Payne (Ed. By Evan Davies)
- Revivals in Wales. Facts and correspondence supplied by the Pastors of the Welsh Churches; London : J. Snow, 1859. 96 p.
- Works of the late Rev. Edward Williams of Rotherham. 4v; Edinburgh : Ballintyre, 1862. (Ysgrifennodd nodiadau ar Bechod Gwreiddiol a Bedydd a welir yng ngwaith Dr Williams, editor)
