= Geraldine Taylor =

Author and Missionary to China

Mary Geraldine Guinness
- Mrs. Howard Taylor: Missionary and Author
- Born: 25 December 1862; Liverpool, Lancashire, England
- Died: 6 June 1949 (aged 86); Tunbridge Wells, Kent, England
- Spouse: Frederick Howard Taylor (m. 1894; died 1946)
- Parent(s): Henry Grattan Guinness; Fanny E. Guinness

Mary Geraldine Guinness (Chinese: 金樂婷; 25 December 1862 – 6 June 1949), often known as Mrs. Howard Taylor, was a British Protestant Christian missionary to China, and author of many missionary biographies on the history of the China Inland Mission (CIM).

== Life ==
She was born in 1865. She was the daughter of revivalist preachers and authors Fanny Grattan Guinness and Henry Grattan Guinness. Her father was a friend of James Hudson Taylor, founder of the CIM. She became Taylor's daughter-in-law when she married his son, fellow CIM missionary Frederick Howard Taylor.

== Single woman and missionary ==
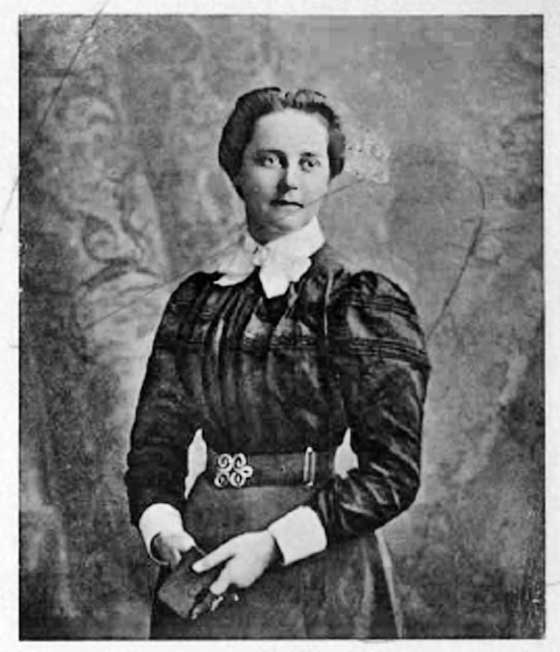
Mrs. Howard Taylor

In her youth, Taylor taught a Bible class for "factory-girls" in Bromley-by-Bow in the East End of London where they lived. She attended meetings at "Berger Hall" named after William Thomas Berger.

At the age of 23, she joined the China Inland Mission and made plans to go to China as a missionary.

She left London for China as a second-class passenger on the P&O vessel Kaisar-i-Hind I in January, 1888, age 22. The Hundred missionaries had all sailed to China the previous year. Among the 25 passengers (16 men, 5 ladies [sic]) aboard the steam ship with her were Miss Mary Reed (daughter of Mrs Henry Reed and sister of Mrs Harry Guinness), Mr and Mrs Hunt (travelling to Hanzhong) and the Pigott family of The Sheo Yang Mission (who were eventually killed during the Boxer Rebellion).

As recorded in In the Far East (1889), the Kaisar-i-Hind took a route passing Gibraltar (10:30pm, 31 January 1888), calling at Naples and then passing the Straits of Messina, stopping for a day at Aden and then onward to Colombo, Ceylon.

At Colombo the missionary party boarded the P&O vessel S.S. Deccan, bound for Shanghai. A stop in Penang, Malaysia, allowed Geraldine a first contact with many Chinese who came on board. Then a stop at Singapore followed. Her first time on Chinese soil was later at a stop at Hong Kong where she was received by Dr and Mrs Chalmers of the London Missionary Society, who introduced them also to Mr and Mrs Bender of the Basel Mission. Shanghai was reached next. But Shanghai was not their final destination. Staying only long enough to exchange their European clothes for the national Chinese costume, the missionaries started on again, leaving this first station of the China Inland Mission behind them and travelling on the boat Fuh-ho ("Happy Harmony") in the substantially cheaper Chinese accommodations up the Yangtze River to Zhenjiang. Lastly on to a barge some 6 hours to Yangzhou, finally arriving at Yangzhou on 23 March 1888.

She wrote to her sister after a short time in China:

Oh! if English Christians only knew the need and the longing willingness of these dear souls to hear the glad tidings, and the joy, the unspeakable joy of a missionary's life, they would surely cry from the depths of yearning hearts, "Lord, here am I, send me, send me."

After training in China, Geraldine was eventually stationed in Henan Province.

While in China, she met up with Frederick Howard Taylor, a medical doctor who had also travelled to Asia with CIM; they got engaged and were married in 1894.

She had an ability for writing and was asked to write a history of the CIM and a biography of her father-in-law; she went on to write over 20 books about missionaries in China.

== Published works ==
- In the Far East (1889)
- The Story of the China Inland Mission (1893)
- One of China's Scholars: The Early Life and Conversion of Pastor Hsi (1900)
- Peru: Its Story, People and Religion (1909)
- Hudson Taylor In Early Years; The Growth of a Soul (1911)
- Though War Should Rise (1914)
- Hudson Taylor and the China Inland Mission; The Growth of a Work of God (1918)
- Pearl's Secret (1920)
- With P’u and His Brigands (1922)
- The Call of China's Great North-West or Kansu and Beyond (1923)
- Borden of Yale '09 (BordenofYale.com) (1926)
- Guinness of Honan (1930)
- Hudson Taylor's Spiritual Secret (1932)
- Faith's Venture (1932)
- Margaret King’s Vision (1934)
- The Triumph of John and Betty Stam (1935)
- By Faith: Henry W. Frost and the China Inland Mission (1938)
- The Untroubled Heart (1939)
- Sirs, Be of Good Cheer (1941)
- A Story Without End
- Behind the Ranges: Fraser of Lisuland (1944)
