= Fauld =

Faulds or Fauld could refer to different subjects:

- Faulds (plate armour), part of a medieval suit of armour
- RAF Fauld explosion, a disaster during World War II
  - RAF Fauld, the site where the above explosion took place
