= Wang Laiquan =

Chinese Protestant Christian pastor and missionary in Hangzhou, Zhejiang, China

- Pastor and Missionary
- Born: unknown Ningbo, China
- Died: unknown possibly Hangzhou, China

Wang Laiquan or Wang Laijun (王来俊) (1835-) was a Chinese Protestant Christian pastor and missionary in Hangzhou, Zhejiang, China in the late 19th century. "One of China's great, if unsung Christians, after Pastor Xi Shengmo... he was perhaps the most notable Chinese connected with the China Inland Mission."

== Beginnings ==
Wang was a painter and skilled artisan living in his native Ningbo when he was hired by the pioneer Christian missionary Hudson Taylor to work in his home. As he was working one day on a ladder he overheard a local basket-maker, Feng Ninggui, who had professed faith in Jesus Christ, explaining why he no longer made incense containers that were used for idol worship. Wang was soon converted to Christianity as well under the ministry of Taylor in the days before the founding of the China Inland Mission.

After his baptism in 1859, Taylor met with Wang individually to instruct him in Christian teaching from the Bible and Wang joined the small congregation of believers that was growing in Ningbo.

Wang put his new faith into immediate service and worked at the local mission hospital that Taylor had taken charge of - with no promise of income other than what he believed that the Lord would provide as needed.

Wang soon learned from Taylor how to read and write the Romanized Ningbo dialect and began teaching others what he had learned about God from the Scriptures.

== England ==
In 1860 Taylor’s health was deteriorating and Wang accompanied the Taylor family to London, England in 1860 as a helper and language tutor for new missionaries. He also assisted Taylor, his wife, Maria and Frederick Foster Gough. He took on ministry work and revised the Ningbo dialect New Testament in Romanized colloquial for the Bible Society. Wang’s native language expertise assured that the final translation would be accurate and trustworthy.

While in England, Wang became part of the Taylor family in many ways: helping with laundry, helping Maria take care of the little children, and joining with Taylor in close personal discipleship training and even medical studies. Taylor took him to meet the famous London Baptist preacher, Charles Spurgeon at the Metropolitan Tabernacle. Together they influenced Spurgeon to promote the cause of missionary work in China with his sermons and writings. Taylor also brought Wang to meet the Bristol orphanage founder George Muller who would later fund one third of the China Inland Mission budget in the following years of 1866-1871.

Taylor promoted Wang's abilities as a preacher even in England and acted as interpreter for him when he spoke to English congregations.

== Return to China ==
He returned to China in 1864 and worked with the United Methodist Free Church. He was then appointed pastor of the church in Hangzhou begun by the China Inland Mission in 1866-1867. He served as a pastor for 40 years.

== Family ==
He had a wife and one son.

== See also ==
- Historical Bibliography of the China Inland Mission
