= Lammermuir (1856 clipper) =

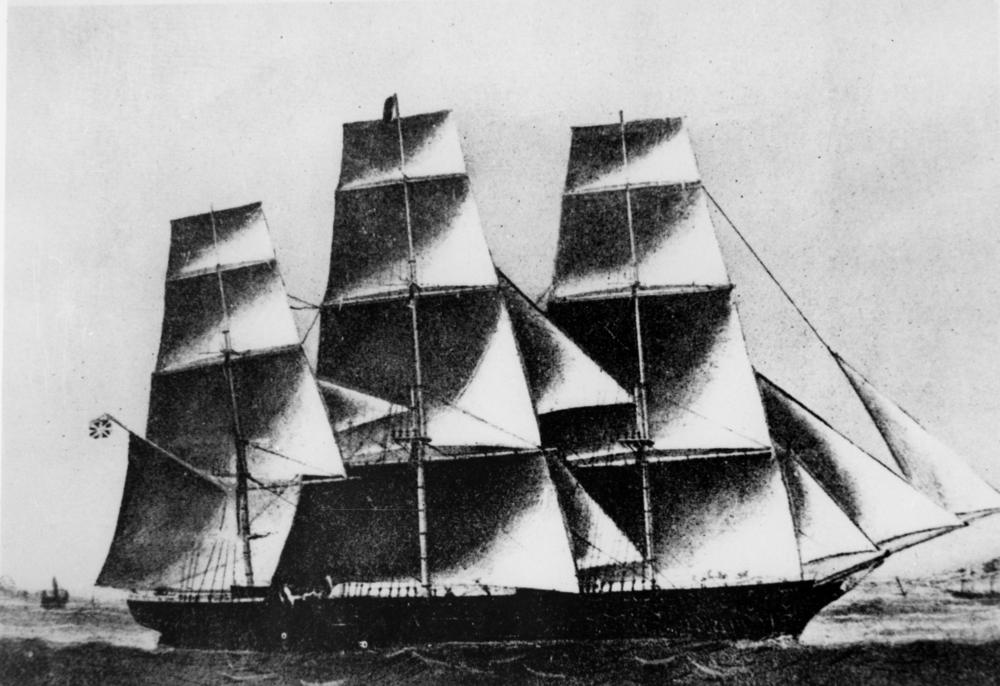
- Lammermuir, built in 1856.

History

United Kingdom
- Name: Lammermuir
- Namesake: Lammermuir Hills
- Owner: John Willis
- Port of registry: London
- Builder: Michael Byers & Co, Monkwearmouth
- Launched: 8 January 1856
- Completed: 20 February 1856
- Identification: UK official number 13717
- Fate: Wrecked 31 December 1863
- Notes: designed by William Pile

General characteristics
- Type: Tea clipper
- Tonnage: 952 NRT
- Length: 178.0 ft (54.3 m)
- Beam: 34.0 ft (10.4 m)
- Depth: 22.0 ft (6.7 m)
- Sail plan: full-rigged ship

Lammermuir, named for the Lammermuir Hills, was a tea clipper designed by William Pile. She was the first clipper owned by Jock Willis Shipping Line. She was a fast sailer, being the second ship home in the 1858-59 tea season. She was a favourite of John Willis senior.

== Building ==
Michael Byers & Co built Lammermuir at his Strand Street shipyard in Monkwearmouth, launching her on 8 January 1856 and completing her on 20 February. She had a wooden hull. Her registered length was 178.0 ft (54.3 m), her beam was 34.0 ft (10.4 m), her depth was 22.0 ft (6.7 m) and her tonnage was 952 NRT. She had three masts. She did not set any sails above royals, but she did have a great spread of sail.

John Willis registered the ship at London. Her UK official number was 13717.

== Loss ==
Lammermuir was wrecked on the Amherst Reef in the Macclesfield Channel, Gaspar Strait, on 31 December 1863.

Jock "White Hat" Willis commissioned a replacement Lammermuir, which was launched in 1864 and completed in 1865. The wreck of the first Lammermuir was still visible above the water line in August 1866 when the second Lammermuir sailed past en route to China, and also subsequently in 1874.

== Bibliography ==
- Broomhall, Alfred James, 1983, Hudson Taylor and China's Open Century, Volume Four: Survivors' Pact, London, Hodder & Stoughton and Overseas Missionary Fellowship ISBN 9780340349229
