= Frederick Foster Gough =

Frederick Foster Gough (bapt. 7 February 1825 – 1 June 1889) was an Anglican Christian missionary who served with the Church Missionary Society during the late Qing Dynasty in China.

The second son of Ralph and Catharine Gough of Gosbrook House (later Gorsebrook House), Bushbury, Staffordshire, he was christened on 7 February 1825 at the church of Saint Peter, Wolverhampton, Staffordshire. He was educated at St John's College, Cambridge, where he obtained a BA in 1847 and his MA in 1853.

In 1848, he became a curate of St. Luke's, Birmingham.

In 1849, he travelled to Hong Kong to work with George Smith (bishop of Victoria); Smith instructed him to join William Russell and Robert Henry Cobbold in Ningbo (Ningpo), where they were working with Mary Ann Aldersey.

In 1861, he returned to London where he, Hudson Taylor and Wang Laiquan worked on the romanized translation of the New Testament into Ningbo; he returned to China in 1869 and stayed for 12 years before retiring to London.

He died on 1 June 1889 in Wolverhampton, Staffordshire.

His papers are held at the Church Mission Society Library in Oxford.

== Family ==
He married Mary Vigars LeMare, at Christ Church, Salford, Lancashire, on 4 April 1854, and they had one child named Ellen; he was widowed seven years later when his wife died in London in early 1861. Ellen Gough married Joseph Hoare (bishop of Victoria) and they had six children.

On 15 November 1866 in London, he married Ann Marie, the widow of the Reverend John Jones who had been a missionary in Ningbo; she died in November 1877.

In 1882 he married again in Islington, London; the bride was Emily Bear, a missionary and governess who had looked after his children.

Hudson Taylor’s son Frederick was named after Gough.
