= Jennie Faulding Taylor =

English missionary in China (1843–1904)

Jane Elizabeth Faulding
- Jennie Taylor
- Born: 6 October 1843; England
- Died: 31 July 1904 (aged 60); Les Chevalleyres, Switzerland

Jane Elizabeth "Jennie" Faulding Taylor (6 October 1843 – 31 July 1904), was a British Protestant missionary to China with the China Inland Mission. She pioneered the work of single women missionaries in China and eventually married the founder of the mission, James Hudson Taylor, after the death of his first wife, Maria Jane Dyer. As Taylor's wife, she assumed many roles within the mission agency when Taylor was overseas - acting at times as a home director for the mission. She encouraged women, both married and unmarried, to participate in the work of the China Inland Mission in ways that had previously only been reserved for male missionaries.

== Early life in London ==
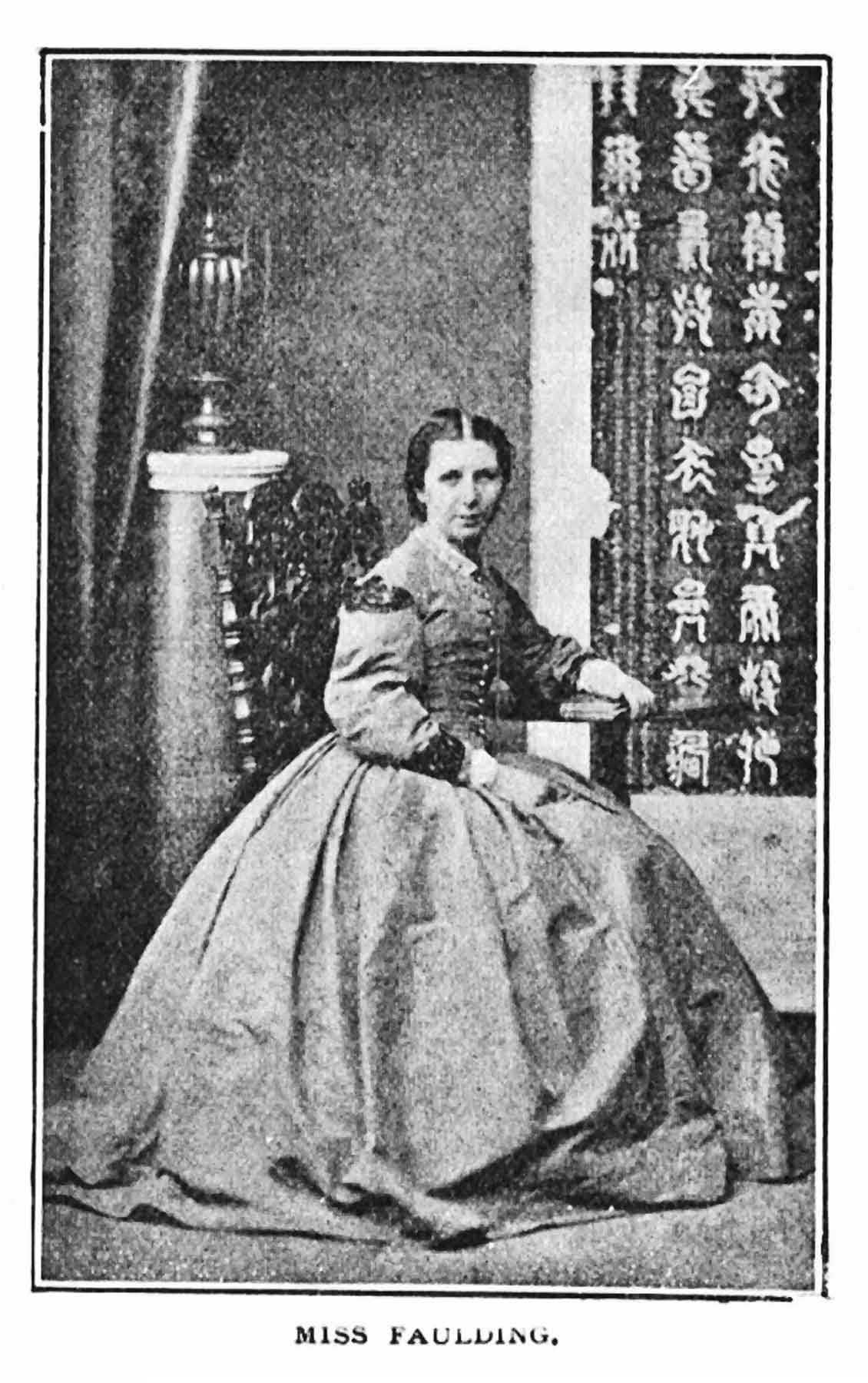
Jennie Faulding in 1866

Jane Elizabeth Faulding was the daughter of a piano manufacturer in London. She was an 1865 graduate of the Home and Colonial Training College along with her friend, Emily Blatchley. She had met Taylor when she was nine and attended the weekly prayer meeting at the home of Hudson and Maria Taylor in the East End of London in 1865; she helped to proofread the Taylors' book "China's Spiritual Need and Claims", and was influenced by this work which spoke of the desperate need for the Gospel message to be brought to the Chinese before they died "without God and without hope in the world".

== The youngest missionary ==
When the Taylors were recruiting missionaries to go with them back to China, Faulding and Blatchley volunteered to accompany the 14 other candidates who were all as inexperienced as themselves. Faulding was the junior member of the Lammermuir Party, the largest party of Protestant missionaries ever to sail to China in 1866, but she quickly proved herself useful.

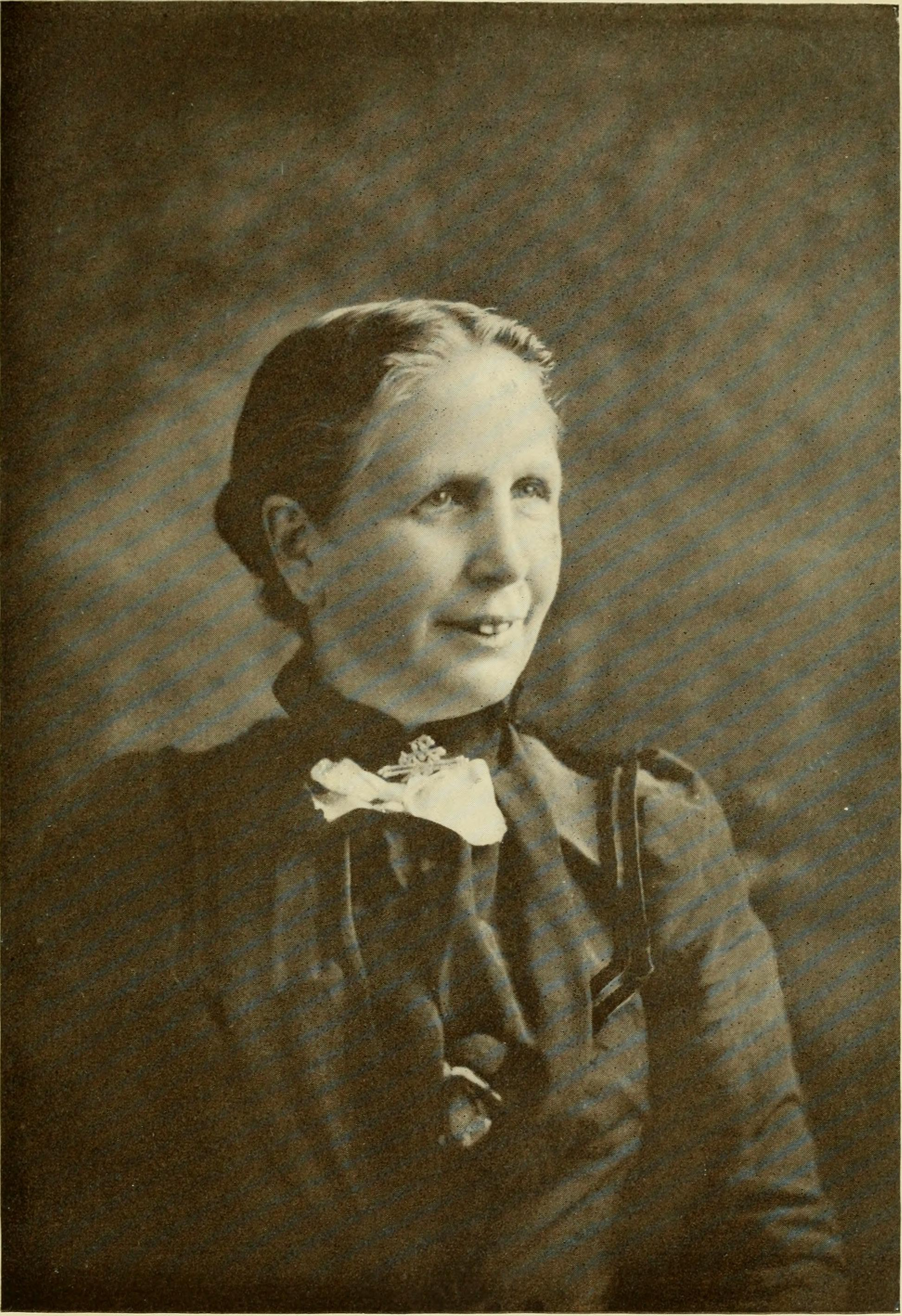
Jennie Taylor (née Faulding)

== Pioneering work among women ==
On the journey, they weathered two typhoons and a near shipwreck. Once in China, they donned Chinese clothes and ventured down the Grand Canal, looking for a place to settle down to mission work. It caused a scandal among the other Westerners in China to see a young single woman like Faulding adopt the Chinese dress, which was considered a compromise with an idolatrous culture. However, Taylor was undeterred in encouraging his missionaries to "adopt all things not sinful that were Chinese in order to save some".

In Hangzhou, Faulding proved the value of being an unmarried female, as her daily walks around the neighborhood gave her opportunities to be invited in by the Chinese women, who did not feel threatened as they might have by a foreign man. She met with many local women and established a school in Hangzhou.

During her time in China, she lived and worked with Hudson Taylor's wife, Maria, who taught her the Chinese language. Maria died in 1870.

After she had been in China for five years, Faulding was given a furlough at the request of her parents. Taylor accompanied her home in 1871. She had keenly felt the loss of Maria Taylor, her friend and mentor, the year previously. On the way back to England, Hudson proposed marriage. She accepted on the condition of her parents' approval, which was not easily obtained. In November of the same year they were married. She became the stepmother to Taylor's four surviving children and a successor to Maria as the "Mother of the Mission". Together, they had two children of their own and adopted Millie, an orphaned daughter of a missionary.

== Famine relief and later years ==
The news of the terrible Great North China Famine of 1877–78 in Shanxi Province motivated Faulding to go there with two single women as part of a relief team - when no men could be spared to accompany them on their journey and her husband could not go himself. She began an orphanage in Taiyuan, and distributed aid to the starving people there. She also worked as assistant editor to the quarterly journal China's Millions.

Faulding worked alongside her husband until the end of her life. They traveled across the globe many times recruiting missionaries and visiting mission stations in China. She died of breast cancer in Les Chevalleyres, Switzerland in 1904. Hudson remained with her at the end of her life.

== Chronology ==
Jane Elizabeth Faulding was born on 6 October 1843 in England to William Joseph and Harriet Faulding. On 26 May 1866 she sailed from the East India Docks, London, aboard the Lammermuir with James Hudson Taylor and the rest of the Lammermuir Party, travelling via the Cape of Good Hope. The party arrived in Shanghai on 29 September 1866 and settled in December 1866 at 1 Xin Kai Long (New Lane), Hangzhou, Zhejiang, China.

In August 1871 Faulding sailed with Hudson Taylor from Shanghai to Guangzhou aboard the MM Volga, then onward to Marseille via Saigon, Ceylon, Aden, and Suez aboard the MM Ava. She arrived in England on 25 September 1871, travelling from Marseille via Paris to London. She married James Hudson Taylor on 28 November 1871 at Regent's Park Chapel, London, and the couple moved on 15 January 1872 to 6 Pyrland Road, Islington, London.

They returned to China on 9 October 1872, sailing from Marseille aboard the MM Tigre and arriving in Shanghai on 28 November 1872. On 13 April 1873 Faulding gave birth to stillborn twins a son and a daughter in Nanjing, Jiangsu, China.The family sailed back to England on furlough on 30 August 1874, arriving on 15 October 1874. During this period in England, Ernest Hamilton Taylor ("Dai Cun-xin") was born on 7 January 1875 at 2 Pyrland Road, Islington; Amy H. Taylor was born on 7 April 1876 in Islington; and Mary Jane Bowyer Duncan was adopted before 25 December 1877.

Faulding sailed to China without Hudson Taylor on 2 May 1878 for famine relief work, and by approximately September 1878 she had led the advance of women missionaries to the far interior of Shanxi, China. She was reunited with Hudson Taylor on 8 May 1879 in Yantai (Cheefoo), Shandong, and sailed back to England on 13 October 1880.

In subsequent years the couple undertook extensive international travel in support of the mission. Faulding was reunited with Hudson Taylor on 21 December 1890 in Shanghai. In March 1892 they arrived together in Vancouver, British Columbia, Canada, and sailed to England via Canada on 10 May 1892, arriving on 26 July 1892. On 14 February 1894 they sailed from Liverpool and Queenstown aboard the RMS Germanic, arriving at Ellis Island, New York on 24 February 1894, and reaching Shanghai on 17 April 1894. After returning to England after July 1894, they left China for India in February 1896, returning to China in April 1896. They sailed to Italy aboard the Oceania (MM Oceanien) on 2 May 1896, arriving at Brindisi, Italy, and visiting Germany en route to England, where they arrived on 17 June 1896.

The couple visited Switzerland together around July 1897, then sailed to the United States on 24 November 1897, arriving on 18 December 1897. They reached Shanghai on 15 January 1898. A conference with Hudson Taylor took place on 16 January 1899 in Chongqing, Sichuan. On 25 September 1899 they sailed to Australia, and on 5 January 1900 they sailed from Australia to New Zealand. On 20 March 1900 they sailed to the United States from New Zealand, arriving in San Francisco, California, on 5 April 1900, and sailing to England on 9 June 1900, arriving on 19 June 1900.

After their return to England in June 1900, Faulding and Hudson Taylor retired to Davos, Switzerland. She died on 31 July 1904, aged 60, at Les Chevalleyres, Switzerland, and was buried at La Chiesaz church cemetery, near Vevey, Switzerland.
