= William Thomas Berger =

Christian manufacturer

- Missionary Director and Rice Starch Manufacturer
- Born: 1815; England
- Died: 9 January 1899 (aged 83–84); Cannes, France

William and Mary Berger.

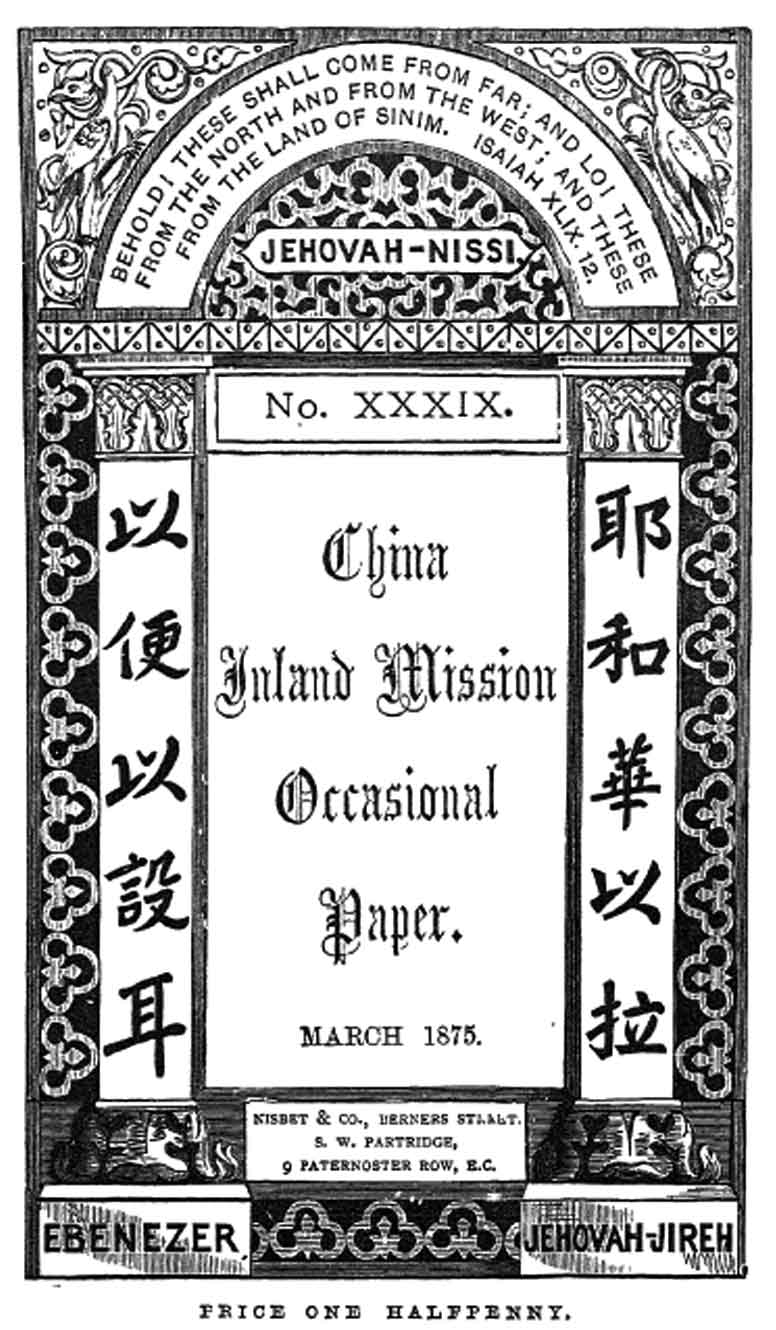
Cover of the Occasional Paper of the China Inland Mission in 1875.

William Thomas Berger (1815–1899) was a manufacturer and devout Christian who became the first home (England) director of the China Inland Mission with James Hudson Taylor in 1865. He was also the owner of Samuel Berger & Co., a patent rice starch manufacturer.

At this time the headquarters of the mission agency was located at Saint Hill Manor in East Grinstead, England. As the Home Director he was responsible for editing the Occasional Paper of the China Inland Mission and carrying on the work of sending more missionaries to follow Hudson Taylor to China.

At the time of the Yangzhou riot that brought unwelcome notoriety to the mission activity in China, Berger had to defend Taylor and his group from the attacks of the British press. Often, he had to assume this role with little or no knowledge of the current events in China due to the delay in communication with the missionaries overseas.

Berger resigned in 1872. This was due to failing health and his personal convictions. His beliefs were similar to Andrew Jukes regarding the eternal punishment of non-Christians (in conflict with the traditional Christian principles of the China Inland Mission). He remained a faithful supporter of the mission and a friend of Hudson Taylor until his death.

== See also ==
- List of China Inland Mission missionaries in China
- Christianity in China
- Benjamin Broomhall
- Historical Bibliography of the China Inland Mission
