= Lammermuir (1864 clipper) =

British Vessel

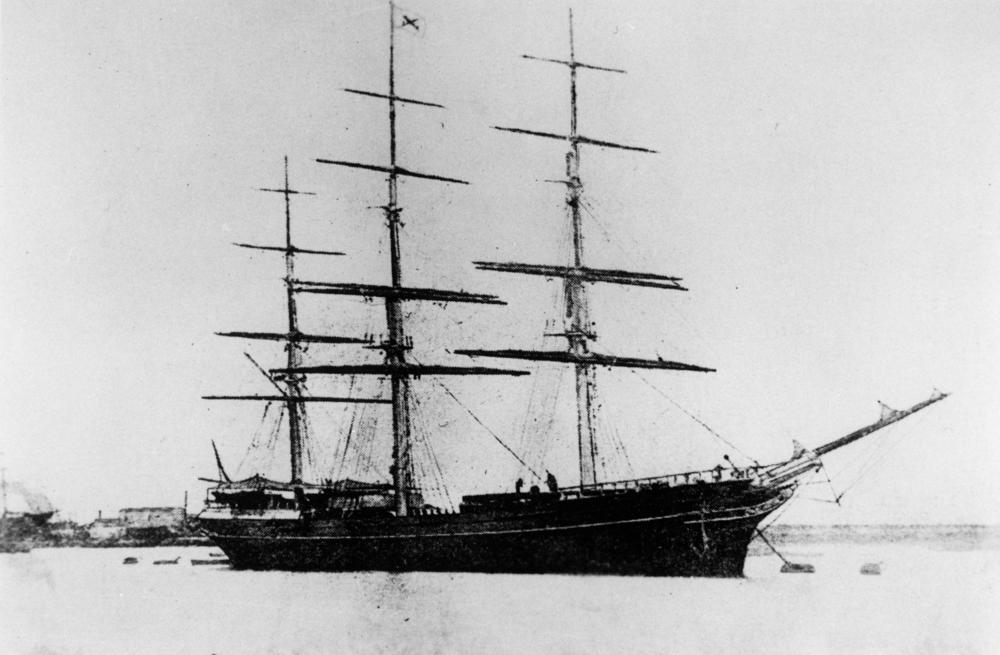
- Lammermuir, built in 1864

History

United Kingdom
- Name: Lammermuir
- Namesake: Lammermuir Hills
- Owner: J&R Dunbar Willis
- Port of registry: London
- Builder: Pile, Spence & Co, West Hartlepool
- Yard number: 60
- Launched: 23 July 1864
- Completed: 2 February 1865
- Identification: UK official number 50192; code letters HCVW
- Fate: Missing at sea 1876

General characteristics
- Type: Tea clipper
- Tonnage: 1,054 NRT
- Length: 200.4 ft (61.1 m)
- Beam: 35.5 ft (10.8 m)
- Depth: 20.9 ft (6.4 m)
- Sail plan: full-rigged ship

Lammermuir was an extreme clipper ship built in 1864 by Pile, Spence and Company of West Hartlepool for John "Jock" "White Hat" Willis & Son, London. She was the second ship to bear the name. The first Lammermuir had been the favorite ship of John Willis, and was wrecked in the Gaspar Strait in 1863.

== Building ==
Lammermuir was built at Swanson Dock in West Hartlepool, launching her on 23 July 1864 and completing her on 2 February 1865. She had an iron hull. Her registered length was 200.4 ft (61.1 m), her beam was 35.5 ft (10.8 m), her depth was 20.9 ft (6.4 m) and her tonnage was 1,054 NRT. She had three masts and was a full-rigged ship.

Willis registered the ship at London. Her UK official number 50192 was and her code letters were HCVW.

== Career ==
Lammermuir was designed for the China tea trade. In 1866 she was almost wrecked in the East China Sea and the Pacific Ocean by two typhoons. Her Master was Captain M Bell, and she carried the famous Lammermuir Party of 18 missionaries and four children of the China Inland Mission outbound to China, arriving in Shanghai on 30 September 1866.

Hudson Taylor recalled the most perilous time in the voyage:

The appearance of things was now truly terrific. Rolling fearfully, the masts and yards hanging down were tearing our only sail... and battering like a ram against the main yard. The deck from forecastle to poop was one scarcely broken sea. The roar of the water, the clanging of chains, the beating of the dangling masts and yards, the sharp smack of the torn sails made it almost impossible to hear any orders that might be given.

In 1873 Lammermuir left London for Adelaide, but without the all-important tool chest for her ship's carpenter. John Willis himself rushed to the docks to see to it that Orient could take the chest along and deliver it to the ship. The captain of Orient bet Willis that he would overtake Lammermuir before it crossed the Equator to transfer the chest at sea, which he did.

The clipper's last voyage was soon after this, from Adelaide to London on 10 November 1876. She never arrived, and was presumed to have been lost at sea.

== Bibliography ==
- Broomhall, Alfred James, (1983), Hudson Taylor and China's Open Century, Volume Four: Survivors' Pact, London, Hodder & Stoughton and Overseas Missionary Fellowship ISBN 9780340349229
- Lubbock, Basil (1921). The Colonial Clippers. Boston: Charles E Lauriat.
- Taylor, F Howard, & Taylor, Mrs, (1918), Hudson Taylor and the China Inland Mission: The Growth of a Work of God, Chapter 6, Morgan and Scott
