= Second Affiliated Hospital of Zhejiang University School of Medicine =

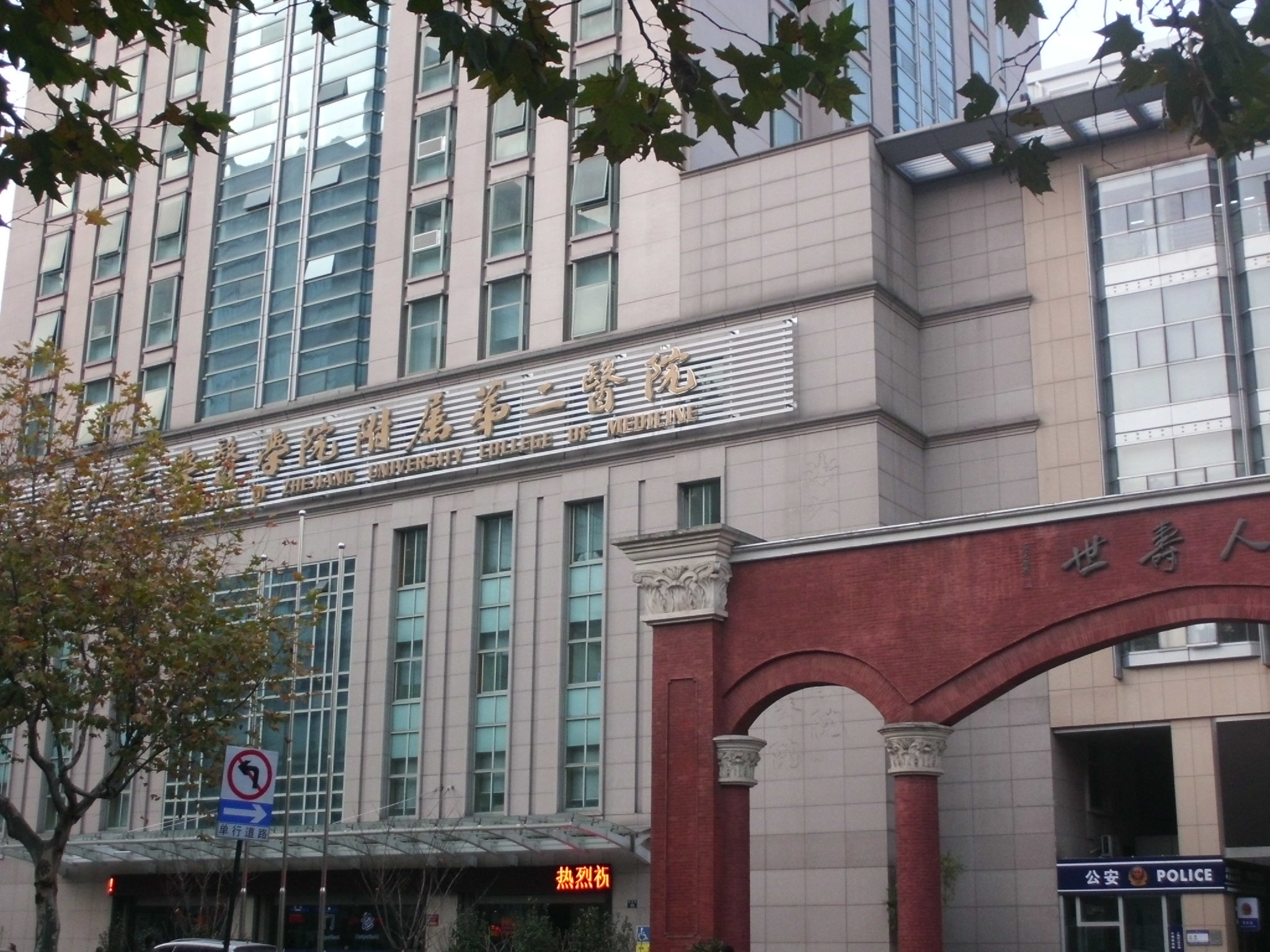
- The exterior of the main building of the hospital on Jiefang Road

Geography
- Location: Hangzhou Binjiang campus: 1511 Jianghong Road, Binjiang District, Hangzhou 310052; Chengdong campus: 300 Juyuan Road, Shangcheng District, Hangzhou 310017; Eye Centre: 1 West Lake Avenue, Shangcheng District, Hangzhou 310009 University Hospital: Zijingang campus, Zhejiang University, 866 Yuhangtang Road, Xihu District, Hangzhou 310058, Zhejiang Province, China
- Coordinates: 30.254997°N 120.176226°E

Organisation
- Care system: Public
- Affiliated university: Zhejiang University School of Medicine

History
- Former names: Kwang Chi Hospital / Hospital of Universal Benevolence / 'British Hospital' (1869-1952); Second Affiliated Hospital of Zhejiang Medical College (1952-1960); Second Affiliated Hospital of Zhejiang Medical University (1960-1998)
- Opened: 1869; 157 years ago

Links
- Website: www.z2hospital.com

The Second Affiliated Hospital of Zhejiang University School of Medicine (浙江大学医学院附属第二医院), known as Kwang Chi Hospital before 1952, is a non-for-profit tertiary care public hospital in Hangzhou, Zhejiang, China. Founded as a drug rehabilitation clinic in 1869 by the British Church Missionary Society, it is one of the oldest hospitals in Zhejiang to offer Western medicine and one of the leading medical centres in China.

== Names ==
Before 1952, the hospital was known as the Hospital of Universal Benevolence in English and Kwang Chi Hospital (traditional Chinese: 廣濟醫院; simplified Chinese: 广济医院) in Chinese. The hospital was more commonly known by the "British Hospital (traditional Chinese: 大英醫院; simplified Chinese: 大英医院)" among the local people as it was run by the British church. From 1883 to 1926, the hospital affiliated a medical college named Hangchow Medical Training College in English and Kwang Chi Medical School (traditional Chinese: 廣濟醫校; simplified Chinese: 广济医校) in Chinese. Kwang Chi is also romanised as Guangji in Pinyin.

After 1952, the hospital became known as the Second Affiliated Hospital of Zhejiang Medical College from 1952 to 1960 and the Second Affiliated Hospital of Zhejiang Medical University from 1960 to 1998. In both periods, the Chinese abbreviation of the hospital remained Zhèyīèryuàn (traditional Chinese: 浙醫二院; simplified Chinese: 浙医二院; lit. 'Zhejiang Medicine Second Hospital'). From the mid-1980s, with the popularisation of Hanyu Pinyin, the postal romanisation of the province, Chekiang, became replaced by its Pinyin form, Zhejiang, which altered the English name of the hospital. After 1998, the Chinese abbreviation of the hospital became Zhèdàèryuàn (Chinese: 浙大二院; lit. 'Zhejiang University Second Hospital') or simply Zhèèr (Chinese: 浙二; lit. 'Zhejiang Second').

== History ==
=== Mission hospital ===
In 1869, James Joseph Meadows, a missionary of the China Inland Mission, rented three houses on Dafangbo Alley (Chinese: 大方伯; lit. 'Chief Secretary') and started a drug rehabilitation clinic with 16 beds in downtown Hangzhou. A year later, the clinic expanded along the alley and a hospital named as the Kwang Chi Hospital, or the Hospital of Universal Benevolence in English, was founded under the leadership of James Galt.

In 1881, David Duncan Main was appointed the director of the hospital by the Church Missionary Society. The hospital became popular under Main's leadership and expanded in 1883 with a leper colony, an orthopedic surgery, a tuberculosis clinic and the Hangchow Medical Training College. The college was the first medical school in Zhejiang, and the second medical colleges in China set up by Westerners after the Department of Medicine of St. John's University in Shanghai. The medical college was also the first missionary school to register with the Chinese government in 1918. By the time Main retired in 1926, the hospital had expanded to have 500 beds, 3 surgery rooms, and hosted around 4,000 in-patients per year. With the help of Main, the hospital received funds from the Leprosy Mission in Edinburgh and the Rockefeller Foundation in the US.

During the May Thirtieth Movement in 1924, a large proportion of the Chinese students at Hangchow Medical Training College withdrew from the student, leading to the closure of the school. The anti-imperialism movement led to personal attacks upon Main and a populist appeal for nationalising his hospital. After 45 years of service in the land, Main left China in 1926. The hospital was then directed by Hubert Gordon Thompson, who allowed wider participation of the Chinese staff in the hospital governance with a half-Chinese, half-Western hospital committee.

After the Northern Expedition in 1927, the hospital was seized by the new local government. Hong Shilü was appointed as the director of the hospital. Zhejiang Provincial Hangzhou Hospital for Infectious Disease became an affiliated hospital of Kwang Chi. In 1928, Kwang Chi was returned to the British church, which was said to be mediated by the First Lady Soong Mei-ling. The infectious disease hospital was independent again, and renamed as the Hangzhou Municipal Hospital for Infectious Disease.

When Thompson resigned in 1928, the hospital was handed over to Stephen Douglas Sturton. Since the Japanese invasion of Shanghai in 1932, the hospital opened a branch hospital to rescue the wounded soldiers from Shanghai and Jianqiao Airbase in Hangzhou, which treated thousands of Chinese soldiers. Gao Zhihang, the first Chinese pilot to shoot down Japanese aeroplane, was treated in the hospital on 15 August 1937. Initiated by Sturton, mediated by the diplomat representatives of the UK, France and the US in Shanghai, the Chinese and Japanese authorities agreed not to open fire within the city of Hangzhou. After the fall of Hangzhou in December 1937, the hospital was also a main shelter for refugees in Hangzhou, which sheltered over 25,000 women and children.

On the evening of 8 December 1941, the Japanese army invaded the hospital, after Japan declared war upon the US and the UK. On the afternoon of 11 November 1942, Sturton was arrested by the Japanese army and sent to a concentration camp in Shanghai. The hospital was then run by the Japanese. Sturton was detained until the surrender of Japan in 1945, after which the Chinese government returned the hospital to him. Sturton left China in 1948.

=== Public hospital ===
The hospital was nationalised under the new Communist government in 1952 and became affiliated with Zhejiang Medical College as its second affiliated hospital. Zhu Yan was appointed the new director of the hospital after the handover. In 1953, Zhu established the first orthopedic clinic in Zhejiang within the hospital. In 1956, Zhu performed the first craniotomy in Zhejiang. In the following year, Zhu established the first neurosurgery clinic in Zhejiang at the hospital, where he provided relevant training to different levels of hospitals in Zhejiang to set up their own neurosurgery clinic. During the Korean War, the hospital staff was recruited to rescue wounded Chinese soldier. The second batch of Chinese medical team for the Korean War was deployed in Nanxun, Zhejiang, where the hospital staff worked for a year and treated over 2,000 wounded soldiers from the battleground. In 1960, as Zhejiang Medical College was upgraded to Zhejiang Medical University, the hospital changed its name to the Second Affiliated Hospital of Zhejiang Medical University.

Since the reform and opening up, the hospital has seen significant expansion. In 1980, No.1 Tower of the hospital was built as the tallest building in Hangzhou. The hospital also introduced the first CT scan and founded the first anesthesia quality control centre in Zhejiang. It was also the first hospital in China to be rated as the Grade A tertiary care hospital, the highest rank of hospitals in China. In 1998, Zhejiang Medical University was merged into Zhejiang University as the School of Medicine. Thus, the hospital adopted its current name - the Second Affiliated Hospital of Zhejiang University School of Medicine. In 2008, the hospital built a new branch in Binjiang. The hospital was accredited as JCI teaching hospital in 2013. In 2016, the hospital received a letter of thanks from the US president Barack Obama for its service during the G20 summit in Hangzhou. In 2018, the hospital signed an agreement with the district government of Xiaoshan to set up a new branch in Shushan Subdistrict.

== Campuses ==
The hospital has five campuses in Hangzhou.

Name	Alternative name	Address	Postcode	Opened
解放路院区 Jiefanglu campus		88 Jiefang Road, Shangcheng district, Hangzhou	310009	1869
滨江院区 Binjiang campus	杭州滨江医院 Hangzhou Binjiang Hospital	1511 Jianghong Road, Binjiang district, Hangzhou	310052	2013
城东院区 Chengdong campus		300 Juyuan Road, Shangcheng district, Hangzhou	310017	2020
浙大院区 University Hospital	浙江大学校医院 Hospital of Zhejiang University	Campuses of Zhejiang University + Qiushi Community & Zijin Wenyuan	310058	
眼科院区 Eye Centre	浙江大学眼科医院 Zhejiang University Eye Hospital	1 West Lake Avenue, Shangcheng district, Hangzhou	310009	2021
博奥院区 Bo'ao campus	心血管院区 Cardiovascular campus	456 Qidi Road, Xiaoshan district, Hangzhou	311202	2022

=== Jiefanglu campus ===
Jiafanglu campus (Chinese: 解放路院区) is the main campus of the SAHZU and is located on the south of the Qingchun campus, or the main campus of First Affiliated Hospital of Zhejiang University School of Medicine. Both hospitals are served by Wan'an Bridge station of Hangzhou Metro. From the 1990s to 2006, the campus saw a significant expansion, during which a series of buildings, namely the General Building for Outpatients, the Emergency Care Centre, the Neurosurgery Centre, the Eye Centre, No. 1 Inpatient Building, No. 2 Inpatient Building, the General Building for Logistics and the International Healthcare Centre, were built. These buildings in total have a land area of 30,800 square metres a floor area of 163,000 square metres, offering 2,200 hospital beds.

=== Binjiang campus ===
Binjiang campus (Chinese: 滨江院区), also known as Hangzhou Binjiang Hospital, was co-founded by Hangzhou Municipal Government, Zhejiang University and the People's Government of Binjiang District in 2013. The campus has 1,200 beds and 453 wards. In addition to the original set of clinics at the SAHZU, the campus offers clinical care for obstetrics and gynaecology clinic and reproductive medicine. The campus is served by Changhe station of Hangzhou Metro.

=== Eye Centre ===
Eye Centre, Second Affiliated Hospital of Zhejiang University School of Medicine (Chinese: 浙江大学第二附属医院眼科中心), also known as Zhejiang University Eye Hospital (Chinese: 浙江大学眼科医院), was set up in 1996 as a specialised eye centre. In May 2017, the centre was further branded as Zhejiang University Eye Hospital, as a joint investment of Zhejiang University, the SAHZU, and Topchoice Medical Corp. In December 2021, the centre was relocated to an ophthalmology-dedicated campus near Hangzhou Railway Station and is connected with Hangzhou Metro's Chengzhan station through Exit D. The new 8-floor eye hospital building is the largest in China, with an utilisable area of 50,000 square metres, which provides most of clinical care for eye diseases, yet the emergency care remains at Jiafanglu campus.

=== University Hospital ===
The University Hospital campus (Chinese: 校医院院区), also known as the Hospital of Zhejiang University (Chinese: 浙江大学校医院), is a direct affiliation of Zhejiang University which came under the management of SAHZU since November 2020. It has 9 clinics on the Yuquan, Zijingang, Xixi, Huajiachi, Zhoushan, Haining and Zhijiang campuses of Zhejiang University, plus the residential areas of the Qiushi Community and Zijin Wenyuan. The hospital treats 600,000 cases per year, with SAHZU experts to provide clinical diagnosis and surgical care every day.

=== Bo'ao campus ===
Bo'ao campus (Chinese: 博奥院区), also known as the cardiovascular campus (Chinese: 心血管院区), is a cardiovascular disease-dedicated campus, located close to the major venues of the 2022 Asian Games in Xiaoshan District. Opened in March 2022, the campus is served by Mingxing Road station of Hangzhou Metro and several bus lines. It has 500 hospital beds and 13 operating rooms, including a hybrid operating room. It has the only vascular interventional robot in Zhejiang.

== Ranking ==
The SAHZU is ranked 11th best hospital in China, according to the Hospital Management Institute, Fudan University. According to the same institute, the SAHZU is the 4th best hospital in East China after Ruijin Hospital, Zhongshan Hospital and the First Affiliated Hospital of Zhejiang University School of Medicine. It is nationwide ranked 10th for general surgery, 10th for neurology, 10th for pulmonology, 4th for neurosurgery, 4th for cardiology, 4th for ophthalmology, 6th for traumatology, 7th for ultrasound medicine, 4th for emergency care, 4th for healthcare management.

== Notable people ==
- James Joseph Meadows, the founder of the drug rehab clinic at Dafangbo Alley, which was the predecessor of Kwang Chi Hospital
- James Galt, the founder and director of Kwang Chi Hospital (1871-1878)
- David Duncan Main, the director of Kwang Chi Hospital (1881-1926), and the founder of Kwang Chi Medical Training College
- Hubert Gordon Thompson, the director of Kwang Chi Hospital (1926-1928)
- Stephen Douglas Sturton, the director of Kwang Chi Hospital (1928-1942, 1945-1948)
- Wu Yun An, a graduate of Hangchow Medical Training College and the Deputy Surgeon General of the Republic of China (1945-1947)

== See also ==
- Zhejiang University School of Medicine
- Zhejiang Medical University
