= Church Missionary Society in China =

Church Missionary Society
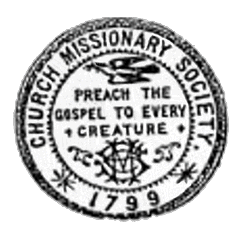
- CMS logo
- Abbreviation: CMS
- Formation: 12 April 1799
- Founder: Clapham Sect
- Type: Evangelical Anglicanism; Ecumenism; Protestant missionary British Commonwealth

The Church Missionary Society in China was a branch organisation established by the Church Missionary Society (CMS), which was founded in Britain in 1799 under the name the Society for Missions to Africa and the East; as a mission society working with the Anglican Communion, Protestant, and Orthodox Christians around the world. In 1812, the organization was renamed the Church Missionary Society. The missions were financed by the CMS with the local organisation of a mission usually being under the oversight of the Bishop of the Anglican diocese in which the CMS mission operated.

== Establishing the mission to China ==
Robert Morrison, of the London Missionary Society, established a mission in Guangzhou (Canton) in 1808; however, the work of Christian missionaries was restricted by the Chinese authorities. After the First Opium War (1839–1842), Hong Kong came under the control of Great Britain and ports on the mainland, including Canton and Shanghai, become open to Europeans. In 1844 the CMS sent the Reverend George Smith (later Bishop of Victoria, H.K.) and the Revd Thomas McClatchie to establish the South China Mission at Shanghai. McClatchie arrived in China, with his family, in 1845 and served nearly forty years until his retirement in 1882; several of his children also stayed in China.

== Expansion of the mission in China ==
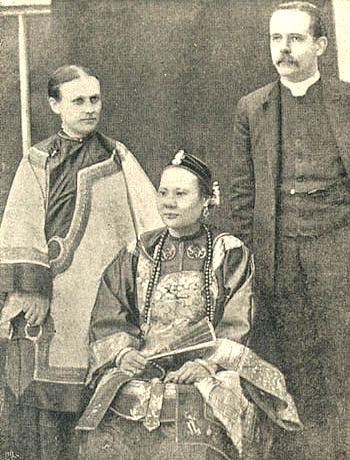
The Revd. and Mrs. Stewart and Mrs. A-hok

The South China Mission was extended to Zhejiang (Cheh-kiang) province at Ningbo (1848), Fujian (Fuh-Kien) province at Fuzhou (Fuh-Chow) (May 1850), Hong Kong (1862), Guangdong (Kwan-tung) province (1878) and later to Sichuan (Si-chuen; see Anglicanism in Sichuan) province in south west China (1890).

The CMS establish hospitals with William Welton beginning work in Fuh-Chow in 1850; followed by Dr B Van Someren Taylor who trained medical catechists. The CMS operated a large number of dispensary hospitals, whose patients included opium addicts at Ningbo, from 1866, and leprosy patients, such as at Beihai (Pakhoi), from 1890, and Hangzhou (Hangchow), from 1892. Dispensary hospitals were established at the major mission stations, such as Kunming (1913) in Yunnan province. Schools were established at the major mission stations; however, the Chinese authorities opposed the missionaries establishing schools at every mission station. The Revd Robert Stewart arrived in 1876 and established a school and college at Fuzhou (Fuh-Chow).

In 1873 the Reverend W. Russell was consecrated as bishop of North China and in 1880 the Reverend George Moule was consecrated bishop of Mid-China (Shanghai and Zhejiang (Cheh-kiang) provinces). As the activities of the Church Missionary Society expanded across China the administration was divided into separate missions: South China (covering Hong Kong, Guangdong (Kwan-tung) and Fujian (Fuh-Kien) provinces); in Mid-China from 1885; and West China (Sichuan (Si-chuen) province) from 1897. Fujian (Fuh-Kien) province was made a separate mission in 1900. In 1911, North China (Guangxi (Kwangsi) and Hunan provinces) also became a separate mission.

== CMS in Shanghai ==
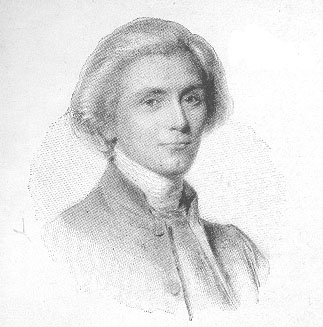
George Smith, Bishop of Victoria (Hong Kong) from 1849 to 1865

The Revd George Smith (later Bishop of Victoria, H.K.) and the Revd Thomas McClatchie were sent by the CMS to establish a mission at Shanghai in 1844.

The Revd John Burdon worked for the Shanghai mission. In March 1874 he was consecrated bishop of the South China diocese of the Anglican Church.

== CMS in Hong Kong ==
The CMS missionaries assisted in establishing St. Paul's College, Hong Kong in 1849. St Stephen's College was established by the CMS in 1902 and CMS missionaries assisted in establishing St. Stephen's Girls' College in 1906.

In 1849 George Smith was made bishop of the new diocese of Victoria (Hong Kong) and warden of St. Paul's College.

St Stephen's Anglican Church was one of three churches founded in Hong Kong by the CMS. It was led by Tsing-Shan Fok (霍靜山), 1851–1918, one of the earliest Chinese clergy in Hong Kong, starting in 1904.

== CMS in Zhejiang (Cheh-kiang) province ==
Anglican priests William Russell and Robert Henry Cobbold began working in Zhejiang (Cheh-kiang) province at Ningbo (Ningpo) in 1847. George Moule (another Anglican priest) arrived at Ningpo in 1848; after which he established a mission at Hangzhou (Hangchow). Additional missions were established in the province. Moule established Trinity College in Ningpo, which was an elementary school and also trained teachers, catechists and pastors. Other schools were established in the province, with the schools surviving into the 1930s. Arthur Moule joined his brother at the mission. He was appointed Archdeacon in the diocese of Mid-China.

The hospital at Hangzhou was established by James Galt in 1871, with the work of the hospital being expanded by David Duncan Main from 1882. Hospitals were also established at Ningpo and Taizhou (Taichow). A medical school was established by Main at Hangzhou in 1908. The Hangchow hospital was commandeered by the Japanese in 1937.

Cobbold (who was made deacon in 1844 and ordained priest in 1845, both times by the Bishop of Norwich) was Archdeacon of Ningpo, 1836–1858; he returned to England, where he was Vicar of Field Dalling (1858–1859) then Rector of Broseley with Linley, Shropshire (1859–1873) At his death on 16 September 1893, he was Rector of Ross-on-Wye and a prebendary of Hereford Cathedral.

== CMS in Guangzhou (Canton) ==
Guangzhou (Canton) became a mission station in 1898. Holy Trinity College opened in 1908 as a boys' school, and was until 1914, also a training college for missionaries. The CMS also established St Hilda's School for Girls, which opened in 1916. These schools operated until the Japanese invasion of Canton in 1938.

== CMS in Guangxi (Kwangsi) province and Hunan province ==
CMS began working in Guilin (Kweilin) in Guangxi province (Kwangsi) from 1899 and in Yongzhou (Yangchow) in Hunan province from 1903. The first bishop of Kwangsi-Hunan, William Banister, was consecrated in 1909. In 1910 the CMS started a mission in Hengyang (Hengchow). The Way of Life Hospital was established in Kweilin in 1910. Following the invasion of China by the Japanese in 1937 many of the missionaries left.

== CMS in Fuh-Kien (Fujian) ==
In May 1850, an English ship turned into the Min river on the south China coast some 400 miles north of Hong Kong. She made her way slowly up the river for twenty miles before arriving at Pagoda Anchorage. Passengers and cargo would have to make the final ten miles to Fuh-Chow (Fuzhou) in junks or sampans. Thus, the Revd W. Welton, a man with medical qualifications, as mentioned in an earlier section, and Revd R. D. Jackson arrived at Fuh-Chow, Fuh-Kien as missionaries of the CMS. American missionaries had preceded them by four years. Five years later Revd F. McCaw and Revd M. Fearnley joined the mission. These early missionaries either died of fever or moved back to England.

The Revd George Smith was the next arrival in 1859 yet only a year later the CMS was considering abandoning Fuh-Chow where not a single conversion had been achieved. However, that year yielded baptisms and in 1862 Revd John Richard Wolfe was appointed as missionary minister in Fuh-Chow. Smith died in 1863 leaving Wolfe alone until Revd A. W. Cribb joined him in late 1864. A small number of other clergy and their wives followed including Revd J. E. Mahood in 1868.

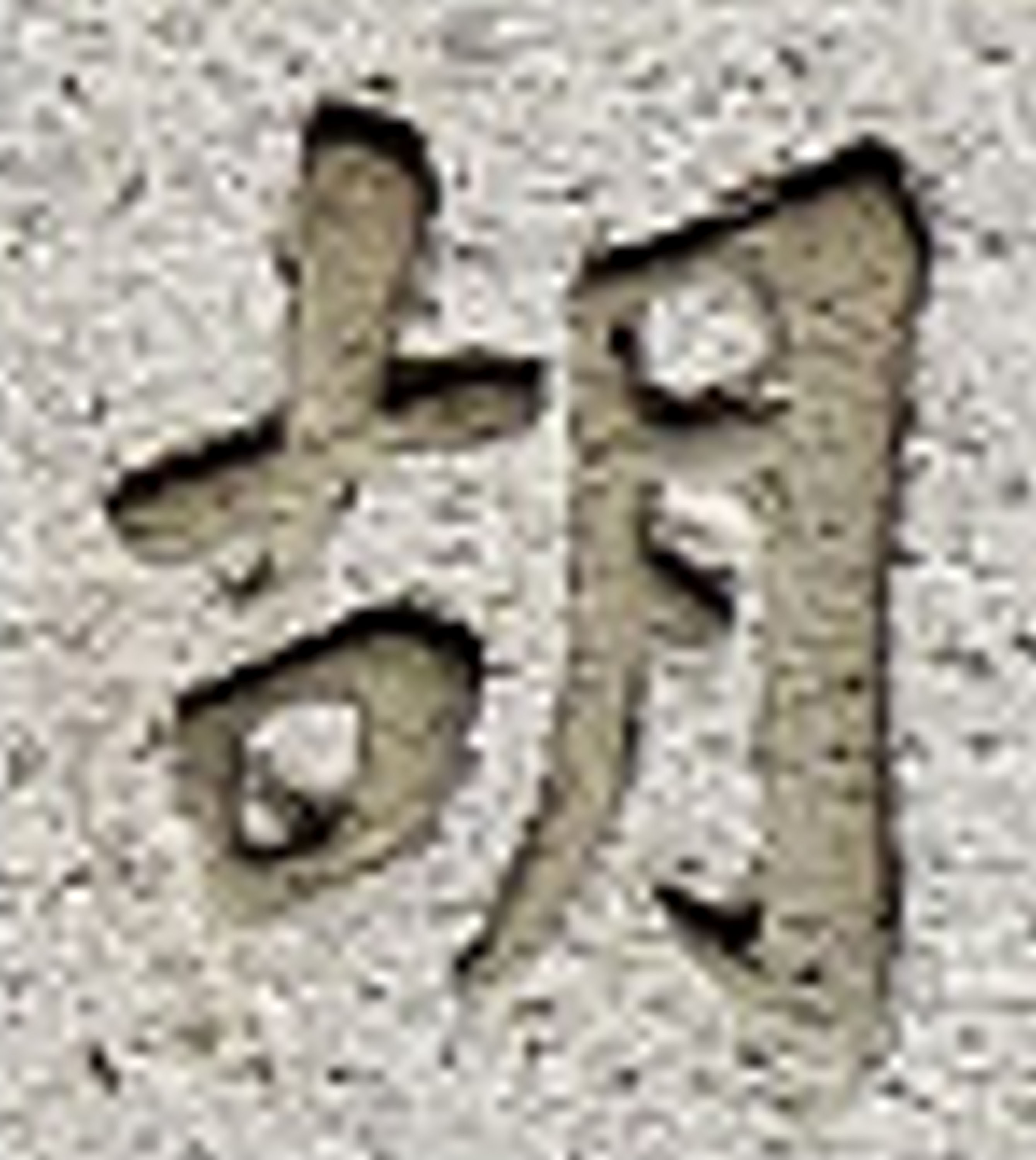
Ancient Moon on dulian right of doorway of Christ Church Cathedral, Fuzhou, China. The sound of Ancient Moon when said in Chinese, sounds very like Wolfe.

Slowly numbers of adherents began to increase, such that within the next fifteen years, three thousand Chinese converts could be counted, many living in country districts such as Lieng-Kong (Lianjiang), Lo-Nguong (Luoyang), Ning Taik (Ningde) and Ku-Cheng (Putian), places Wolfe and Cribb regularly visited, and being considerable journeys (itinerations) of some days from Fuh-Chow.

As well as building churches and/or renting buildings, the missionaries and their wives, like Mary Wolfe, early established both elementary and intermediate level schools for boys and girls. Later, senior boarding schools, for example, Trinity College, which came to have solid reputations were founded. The first CMS church to be opened in Back Street, Fuh-Chow in 1865 was known as All Saints and stood there for about 125 years. Earlier in 1860 St John's Church on Nantai Island had been built by the English trading community.

Later, hospitals were erected and staffed by medical missionaries and nurses. A theological college for training Chinese men also on Nantai Island was opened by Bishop Burdon in 1883. By 1894, the CMS employed 27 medical missionaries worldwide; Isabella Mears was the only female physician medical missionary worldwide and was based at Fuh-Kien.

Wolfe, himself, came to be described as "the chief instrument in the remarkable ingathering in the Fuh-Kien Province" and he remained the senior and longest serving missionary until his death in 1915 having given 53 years to the missionary cause in Fuh-Kien. He was known among the Christian Chinese as the "Fukien Moses."

In an article in the CM Gleaner in 1893, he wrote of the bleak outlook for the Mission in 1862. He further describes the progress such that by 1893 the Mission had extended its operations into five of the largest prefectures or provinces of Fuh-Kien which covered an area half the size of England. Across this area there were 170 churches or places of worship in 17 large counties with nearly 11,000 adherents. Since 1862, 15 Chinese clergy had been ordained. There were also 125 trained catechists and 38 theological students in training. Over all the counties, 106 Chinese schoolmasters were teaching in elementary schools with two or three boarding schools for boys in country stations as well as a high school for advanced students in Fuh-Chow in which young men were training for entrance to the theological college to become future pastors and teachers. The Mission had four boarding schools for girls and three schools for training the wives of catechists, students and other women for Christian work whether as voluntary or as paid Bible women. Also, by 1893, two medical missions were in operation in the prefectures of Fu Ning and Kieng-ning carried out by Dr. B. Van Someren Taylor and Dr. Rigg. They were assisted by Chinese men who they were training.

Medical work expanded further in the next decades with Wolfe, particularly gratified, when a hospital was opened in 1905 near the North Gate of Fuh-Chow. Dr. Wilkinson was in charge, assisted by his wife Amy Oxley/Wilkinson who opened a blind school for boys in which much was achieved through her efforts and for which she was awarded the very rare Chinese Government Order of the Golden Grain in 1917.

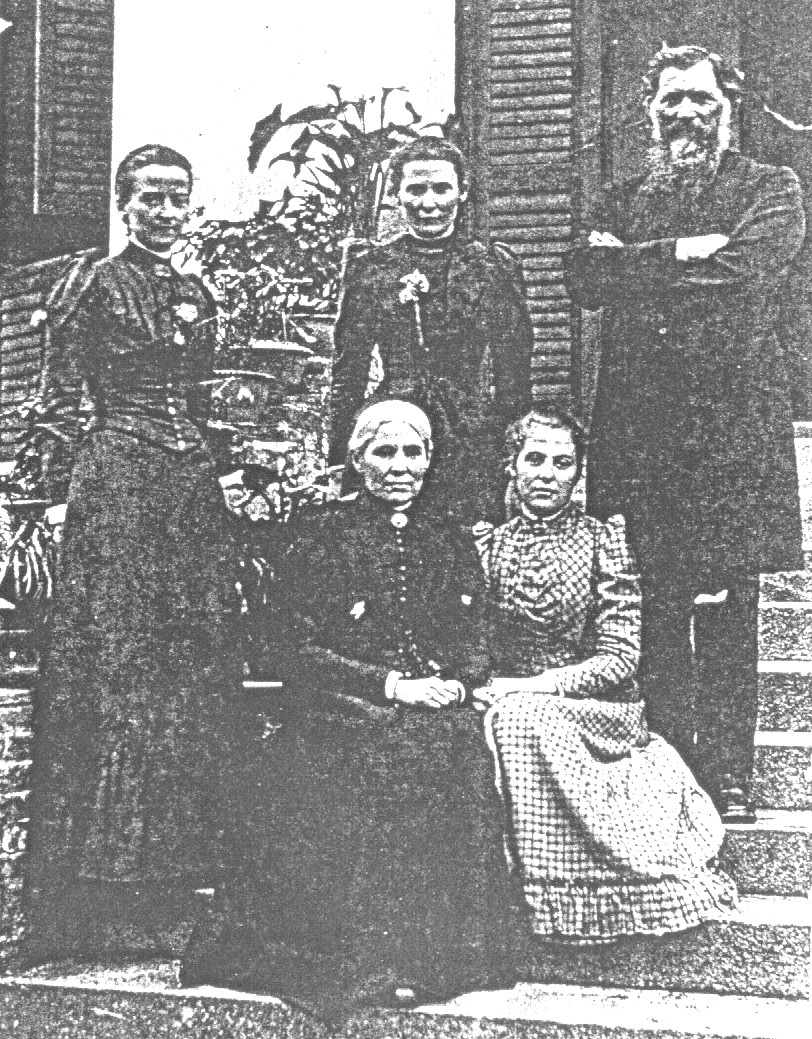
Revd John Richard Wolfe with wife, Mary, and daughters, Minnie, Annie and Amy

Wolfe also reported in 1893 of the women missionaries of the CMS, in the Church of England Zenana Missionary Society (CEZMA) and the Female Education Society (FES), working all over the Mission among women. At that date, five women were evangelising Chinese women in schools and congregations. Miss E. S. Goldie had arrived in 1887, Miss M. D. Boileau, 1889, and sisters Misses J. C. and J. E. Clarke together with Miss Minnie E. Wolfe are listed in 1892. Miss Bushell and Miss Lambert lead the Girls' Boarding School in Fuh-Chow which was to produce Christian wives, teachers, nurses and doctors over many decades.

By 1900 sixteen English clergy, eleven Chinese clergy and 34 CMS women missionaries as well as approximately the same number of CEZMS women were serving in Fuh-Chow and in other prefectures. Among them were eight women who arrived in 1896 undeterred by the Kucheng massacre the year before. The Revd Robert Stewart, his wife, a child and six women missionaries were killed. The dangers and hazards of missionary life were considerable and included health risks arising from insanitary conditions and anti-European feelings expressed in hostile actions towards people and their buildings. The Kucheng massacre was by far the largest of the latter. Missionaries did not cease their preaching and teaching in the area. Later in 1930 two women missionaries, Miss Eleanor Harrison and Miss Edith Nettleton were murdered in Chungan in north west Fuh-Kien.

A year after Archdeacon Wolfe's death in 1915, Revd Llewellyn Lloyd wrote of the many changes taking place in China following the Revolution of 1911 and in the growth of the Mission. The revolution itself, brought many benefits to the status and education of women. He estimated the number of missionaries was fiftyfold what it had been in 1876 and a Provincial Synod complemented Church Councils. He notes that the Fuh-Kien Mission had the largest staff of women missionaries of any CMS Mission in the world. And among these women were three Wolfe sisters, Annie and Amy having joined Minnie.

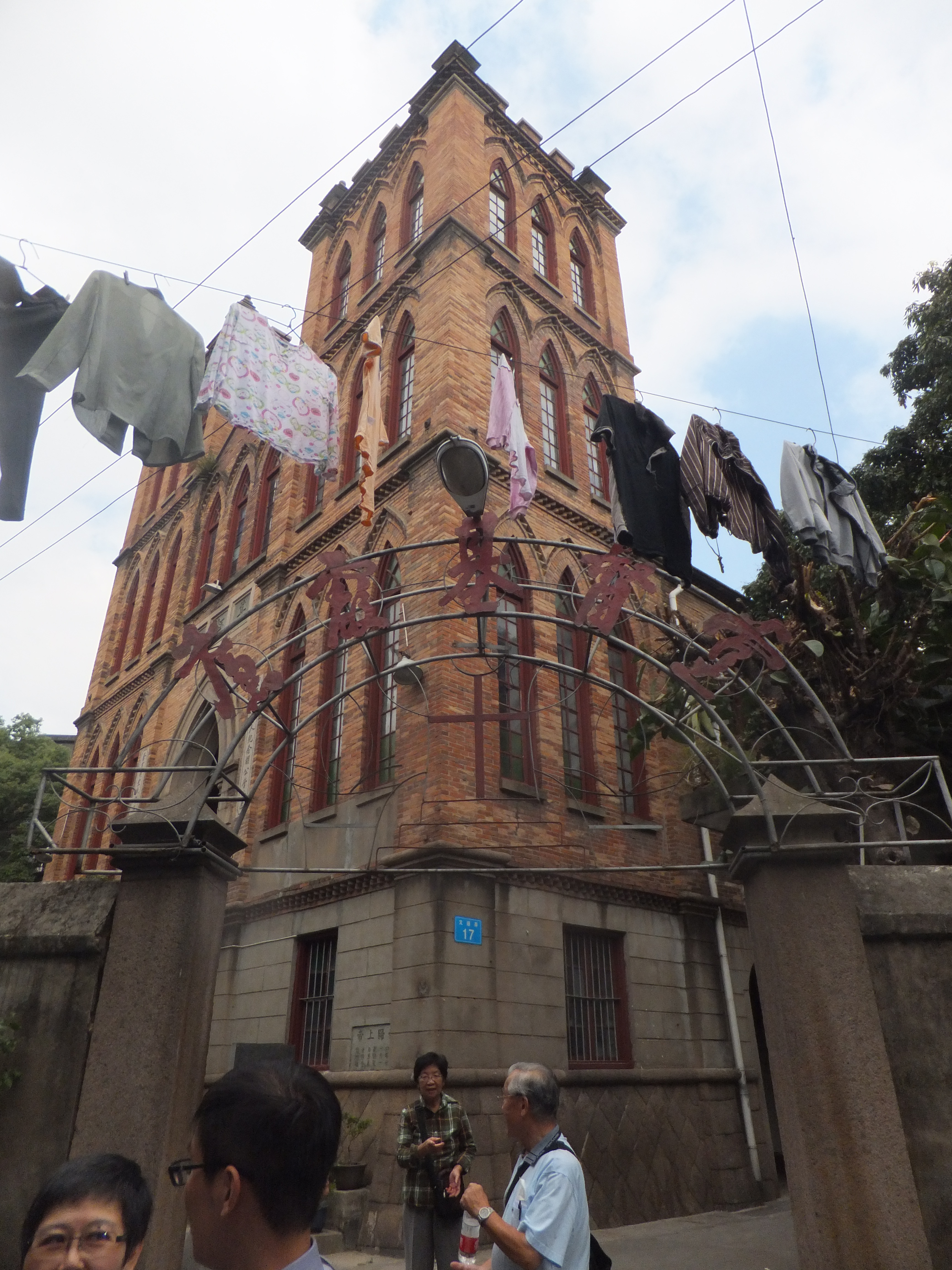
Christ Church Cathedral, also known as Cangxia Church

In 1910 Archdeacon Wolfe was honoured by the CMS making him a Vice President of the Society the first and only Vice President not to be a bishop. He was further honoured at the eighth Synod of Fuh-Kien held in 1917 when money was pledged by European and Chinese delegates to build a cathedral in his memory. Christ Church Cathedral was consecrated on 13 November 1927. On the right hand side of the main entrance an inscription in Chinese characters marked in stone reads in translation as "with the ancient moon shining upon modern men we commemorate Archdeacon Wolfe who ministered here." (John Wolfe's name in Chinese sounded very like the English sounds in ancient moon and became his longstanding nickname.) The church still stands and a Christian congregation worships regularly.

== From Mission to Diocese ==
Up until 1906 Fuh-Kien was known as the South China Mission of the CMS and was an ecclesiastical archdeaconry of the Diocese of Hong Kong, visited by the Bishops of Hong Kong. In that year Revd J. C. Hoare was appointed bishop of Fuh-Kien followed by Bishops Price and Hind who had served as a missionary in Fuh-Kien since 1902. Under Bishop Hind progress continued on the indigenisation of the Church (all meetings for example, had to use the appropriate Fuh-Kien dialect) and some priority was given to the education and position of women in the church. He strongly encouraged the ordination of women as deaconesses.

During his time the CMS passed control of the mission to the diocese and he was a careful organiser and manager of this process. By 1929 only hospitals and dispensaries came under mission control. If Archdeacon Wolfe was father of the mission, Bishop Hind was father of the emerging and strengthening diocese.

Hind had appointed Revd Ding Ing Ong as Archdeacon of Fukien in 1917 and he was later in 1927 to become Assistant Bishop. It was in 1944 that the first Chinese Bishop of Fuh-Kien Revd Michael Chang was consecrated. Only five years later the Communist Government was in power and the church's position equivocal.

The CMS and its people had been present in Fuh-Kien from 1850 until 1949 or shortly thereafter. An often mentioned feature of the Mission is the long service given by many, and also its position as the largest mission of the CMS in China. From uncertain beginnings and through many difficulties, development and consolidation, evangelisation had effected the building of churches, schools, hospitals and a body of European and Chinese people united in an Anglo-Chinese Christian world.

== CMS activities in the 20th Century ==
The Chung Hua Sheng Kung Hui, or Anglican-Episcopal Province of China, was established on 26 April 1912 by the merger of the various mission activities of the Church of England, the Episcopal Church of the United States, Anglican Church of Canada and other Anglican provinces into one autonomous jurisdiction. There was a gradual transfer of responsibility from the CMS to the Anglican church which occurred in the 1920s and 1930s; although it was not until 1937, with the invasion of China by the Japanese, that substantial authority was given to the Chinese clergy.

Some CMS missionaries returned after the end of World War II. CMS missionaries remained active in Fujian, Guangxi and in Hunan and other places until the communist revolution in China after which they all left China.

== See also ==
- Anglicanism in Sichuan
- History of Christian missions
- List of Protestant missionaries in China
- Protestant missionary societies in China during the 19th Century
- Chung Hua Sheng Kung Hui or Anglican-Episcopal Province of China
