= Mary Ann Aldersey =

First female missionary in China

Mary Ann Aldersey (simplified Chinese: 艾迪绥; traditional Chinese: 艾迪綏, 24 June 1797 – September 30 1868) was the first Christian missionary woman (married or single) to serve in China proper (excluding Macau & Hong Kong, where Henrietta Shuck had been working earlier). She founded a school for girls in Ningbo, Zhejiang. Her pioneering the field of mission work for single women in China was the most remarkable outcome of her life.

== Early life ==
Mary Ann Aldersey was born on June 24, 1797, in Hackney London, England. She was the youngest of four children of Joseph and Elizabeth Aldersey; they belonged to a Church of England congregation led by the Rev. John Eyre (one of the founders of the London Missionary Society), but they later joined a Congregational Church under Rev. John Pye-Smith (a fervent abolitionist).

Aldersey was a native of London from a wealthy nonconformist family. Her father, Joseph, was considered a social leader amongst the small episcopal congregation of Dr. Pye Smith. Aldersey joined the congregation as a member at the age of twenty-one and worked as the financial secretary of the Ladies’ Bible Association. When her mother, Elizabeth, died in 1822, she was required to fulfill twice her usual domestic duties.

== Language training ==
In 1824, Robert Morrison moved to East London and taught English women who were interested in missionary work (usually as partners to their husbands) to speak and read Chinese.

Aldersey studied Chinese under Morrison during his two years in London. Also in attendance were Samuel Dyer and his wife Maria Tarn. The friendship that she forged with Maria eventually led to her inviting their orphaned teenage daughters to work with her in China.

In London, Aldersey was still attached to family ties, but she made gifts to the London Missionary Society that enabled Maria Newell to go to Malacca (1827), where Newell met and married pioneer missionary Karl Gützlaff; she also financially supported Martha Wallace’s missionary work in Malacca with the British and Foreign School Society.

== Missionary career ==
In 1837, she herself was able to go to Asia with Rev. Walter Medhurst who was based in Jakarta. She was never an agent of any missionary society, but she did maintain close links with the London Missionary Society.

She travelled to Surabaya where she started a school. She then left Surabaya with Mary Ann Leisk and two local teenagers, Christiana Kit and Ruth Ati, and moved to Hong Kong; when the treaty ports in China were opened (1843), the four of them moved to Ningbo, where she opened a school for girls.

== Matchmaking ==
Several of her teaching staff were Chinese-speaking daughters of missionaries. At least four became missionary wives, including Maria and Samuel Dyer’s daughters, Burella Hunter Dyer, who married John Shaw Burdon (later Bishop of Victoria), and her sister Maria Jane Dyer, who married James Hudson Taylor in 1857 (against Aldersey's wishes); Christiana Kit and Ruth Ati married local converts to Christianity.

In 1848, William Armstrong Russell and Robert Henry Cobbold arrived from England. Mary Ann Leisk married Russell, who was later a bishop in north China.

== Retirement ==
In 1861, Aldersey handed her school over to the Church Missionary Society and retired to Australia, where she lived until her death. She retired to McLaren Vale, South Australia in 1861 to be near her brother and built a house (Tsong Gyiaou) named after a former preaching station; the name is an anglicised form of 'San Ch'iao' (pronounced 'Song Jow'). It is now part of the McLaren Vale & Districts War Memorial Hospital.

== Honourable mention ==
Aldersey is not be confused with Mary Ann Aldersey (1825–1906), an English botanist who also lived in McLaren Vale.

== Bibliography ==
- E. Aldersey White (1932) A Woman Pioneer in China. The life of Mary Ann Aldersey, London, Livingstone Press
- History of the Society for Promoting Female Education in the East, Edward Suter, London 1847
- Missions to the Women of China, E J Whately, James Nisbet & Co, London, 1866
- Joyce Reason, The Witch of Ningpo (Eagle Books, No. 30.) London: Edinburgh House Press, 1940
- The Story of the China Inland Mission Volume I; Mary Geraldine Guinness, Morgan & Scott, 1894
- Hudson Taylor & The China Inland Mission Volume One: In Early Years; The Growth of a Soul; Dr. & Mrs. Howard Taylor, China Inland Mission, London, 1911
- Hudson Taylor's Spiritual Secret; Dr. & Mrs. Howard Taylor, China Inland Mission, London, 1932 (republished in 2007)
- Hudson & Maria; Pioneers In China; John Pollock, 1964
- Hudson Taylor & China's Open Century Volume One: Barbarians at the Gates; Alfred James Broomhall; Hodder and Stoughton and Overseas Missionary Fellowship, 1982
- Hudson Taylor & China's Open Century Volume Two: Over the Treaty Wall; Alfred James Broomhall; Hodder and Stoughton and Overseas Missionary Fellowship, 1982
- Hudson Taylor & China's Open Century Volume Three: If I Had a Thousand Lives; Alfred James Broomhall; Hodder and Stoughton and Overseas Missionary Fellowship, 1982
- From Jerusalem to Iriyan Jaya; Dr. Ruth Tucker, Zondervan
- Hudson Taylor: A Man In Christ; Roger Steer, Paternoster, 1990
- It Is Not Death to Die; Jim Cromarty, Christian Focus, 2001
- Christ Alone - A Pictorial Presentation of Hudson Taylor's Life and Legacy; OMF International, 2005
- Griffiths, Valerie, Not Less Than Everything, Monarch Books & OMF International, Oxford, 2004
