= David Main =

David Main may refer to:

- David Duncan Main (1856–1934), British doctor and missionary
- David Forsyth Main (1831–1880), New Zealand politician
