= Hubert Thompson =

Hubert Thompson may refer to:

- Hugh Thompson (athlete) (Hubert Thompson), Canadian middle-distance runner
- Hubert Gordon Thompson, English surgeon, missionary doctor, author, photographer, and explorer
