= Stephen Douglas Sturton =

English medical missionary

- Born: September 12, 1896; Cambridge, England
- Died: September 28, 1970 (aged 74); England
- Education: Lyndewode House School, Perse School. Emmanuel College, Oxford Centre for Mission Studies
- Known for: Hangzhou medical missionary work, leprosy work, radiology work
- Spouse: Rose Emily Sturton (1921-1960) Olive Gwendolin Clouston (1962-1966)

Stephen Douglas Sturton (1896 - 1970) was an English medical missionary. He worked in Hangzhou, China and was the last of the Church Missionary Society's English missionaries to leave the country. Sturton was a missionary during China's war times, when he worked to protect his hospital, set up refugee camps, and worked on the front line to save wounded soldiers. He received medals for his work and at one point treated General Chiang Kai-Shek. Eventually, Sturton was captured by the Japanese and taken to two concentration camps. After being freed he returned as president of the C.M.S. Hospital, now the Second Affiliated Hospital Zhejiang University School of Medicine. He details his experiences up to being freed from Fengtai Camp in his book From Mission Hospital to Concentration Camp.

== Early life and education ==
Stephen Douglas Sturton was born on September 12, 1896, in Cambridge, England. His parents, Richard Sturton and Mary Emma raised the family of 8 in a Calvinistic Baptist household, although he later joined the Church of England in 1920. He spent his time playing cricket matches, traveling to Sidney College Farm, and sailing.

Sturton's family has a history of missionary work, as 11 members of his family, mostly from his mother's side, were missionaries. 8 of these family members worked in China and 4 of these were with the CMS, which Sturton later joined. His youngest brother, Clement, also became a medical missionary before dying in 1936 in a riding accident. Sturton first became interested in China and overseas missions at age 8 when members of the China Inland Mission came to stay with the Sturton family.

Sturton first studied at Lyndewode House School, Cambridge, then at Perse School. His science teacher encouraged him to become a medical missionary, so he enrolled in Emmanuel College in 1912 to study medicine. He later studied special missionaries at Oxford.

=== Personal life ===
Sturton met his first wife, Rose Emily Jelley while working at the Royal Sussex County Hospital in Brighton. The two married on July 26, 1921, and later that year left for Hangchow, where she also did missionary work as a nurse. On January 7, 1923, she gave birth to their first daughter and on October 14, 1925, she gave birth to their second daughter. Rose Emily Sturton died on June 5, 1960, at the Hong Kong Sanatorium and Hospital.

Sturton met his second wife, Olive Gwendolin Clouston Fisk, while he was a college student. The two attended constituent colleges of the University of Cambridge, Sturton at Emmanuel College and Clouston at Girton College. They later reconnected after the death of their spouses and were married on June 23, 1962. They were married until Clouston's death in 1966.

== Career ==
After graduating from college in 1918, Sturton became a dresser at the First Eastern General Hospital in England. Then, he moved on to become a Surgeon Sub-Lieut., R.N.V.R., in WWI and served in the destroyer H.M.S. Paladin. He was demobilized in January 1919 and then worked at St. Bartholomew's Hospital. He qualified as M.R.C.S. and L.R.C.P. in January 1920, then joined the Royal Sussex County Hospital in Brighton as an Assistant House Surgeon and later became a House Physician.

Sturton had his first experience with missionary work when his hospital sent him to Jamaica and South America to be a medical attendant. After he came back, he went to his hospital's chapel where he realized that “God had definitely called [him] to the mission-field.” Then, after talking with a missionary from the C.M.S. hospital in Hangchow who had returned home, Sturton decided that he would journey to Hangchow. He got married, spent his vacation studying special missionaries at Oxford, then promptly left for China on November 11, 1921, and arrived in Hangchow on Christmas Eve to work at the C.M.S. Hospital.

After arriving in Hangchow, Sturton's first task was to learn Chinese from an assigned teacher. While studying the language, Sturton worked in the C.M.S. Hospital's pathological laboratory, X-ray department, and outpatient department. Around the end of 1922, he was assigned a medical ward in the men's hospital, where his wife was also a part-time nurse. During this time, he also spoke in the hospital's chapel and eventually gave lectures at the Hangchow Medical Training College, which he later became Dean of in October 1923 until the college's closure in 1927.

=== Civil War ===
In 1924, Sturton had his first experience with the Chinese Civil War, where he worked in the hospital's Red Cross unit, going into fighting zones to treat badly wounded soldiers. Also in 1924, Sturton became in charge of and worked to improve the hospital's leprosy ward by creating new rooms, clinics, and a Christian-based treatment system.

On February 1, 1927, Sturton and his family took a leave of absence. They returned to England, and Sturton spent his time researching tropical diseases at the University of Liverpool. Soon after Sturton's return to England, Hangchow fell to the Nationalists, and in March 1927, the C.M.S. Hospital was taken by the Chekiang Provincial Government.

In March 1928, Sturton returned from his leave of absence. He spent his time working with other C.M.S. members to get the hospital back. During this time of negotiations, Sturton was a medical attendant to Hangchow's Anglo-American community.

Sturton then joined a Red Cross unit of 72 people that was sent to Hsuchow. He worked in a field hospital for the badly wounded, and he led the hospital's second branch. While in Hsuchow, General Chiang Kai-Shek of the National Party moved to Hsuchow, and Sturton became the General's and the General's wife's medical attendant when they fell ill. After mentioning how the C.M.S. no longer had control of their Hangchow hospital, the General ensured that the society got their hospital back.

=== Return to Hangchow ===
Sturton returned to Hangchow and the C.M.S. got their Leper Hospital back on June 23 and their main hospital on July 1. On October 1, 1928, Sturton became the hospital's Medical Superintendent. The hospital returned to its normal conditions, minus the medical school.

At the end of 1932, Sturton took his second leave of absence and returned to England. He spent his time working in the Biochemistry lab at Cambridge and doing work on behalf of the C.M.S. At the beginning of 1934, Sturton and his wife returned to Hangchow. Here, Sturton participated in "medical raids", where he and his unit frequently traveled to different locations, up to 60 miles away from Hangchow, to treat patients.

=== World War II ===
At the beginning of WWII, it became obvious that Hangchow would fall to the Japanese. A Red Cross Committee was formed and Sturton was elected Secretary of the Red Cross. The unit opened refugee camps for civilians and treated soldiers in the C.M.S. Hospital. After the Chinese army retreated and Japan entered the village, the Red Cross camps had an estimated 17,000 people.

Sturton also spent his time visiting nearby towns where fighting took place, treating people, and rescuing refugees. Additionally, he went twice a week to a Japanese camp to treat its Chinese patients.

In May 1939, Sturton and his wife went back to England, and Sturton went back to Hangchow in May 1940 without his wife and kids. During this time, he got an infected mosquito bite that resulted in permanent heart damage.

Japan declared war on Britain and the United States, but the Japanese military allowed Sturton to stay and treat patients at the C.M.S. hospital. They treated 200 patients a day until the Japanese had a failed campaign and took the hospital. Sturton was forced to leave the hospital and spent his time doing quiet medical work around the city.

On November 11, 1942, Sturton and his friend were arrested by Japanese soldiers and were taken to the Haiphong Road Camp, where they became “non-working prisoners of war, with rank of sergeants.” Sturton was given medical duties as his job in the camp.

Sturton was later moved to the Fengtai Camp, and in 1945, he was released when American Flying Fortresses found the prisoners. After being released, Sturton rejoined the Hangchow Hospital as Director after it was reclaimed by the C.M.S.

== Later life ==
Sturton stayed in Hangchow until 1952 when the C.M.S. hospital was given to Zhejiang Hospital to become a teaching hospital. It is unclear what happened in the next decade, but in June 1963, he got his Fellowship in Radiology at the Royal College of Surgeons in Ireland.

Soon after, he traveled to the Hong Kong Sanitorium and Hospital in Happy Valley where he worked as a medical practitioner. Here, he was the head of the Department of Radiology. In Hong Kong, he was also a member of the Anticancer Society and Leprosy Mission.

In 1965, he was ordained to the priesthood and assisted at St John's Cathedral. Sturton returned ill to England in 1969 and spent his time writing his second book.

== Death and legacy ==
On September 28, 1970, Sturton died in a hospital at age 74.

In December 2019, during the 150th-anniversary celebration of the hospital Sturton was once president of, Sturton's grandsons were given a Letter of Gratitude from the Foreign Affairs Office of Hangzhou Municipal People's Government. The letter, written to Sturton, says “You are so great a man who has done your part in the battlegrounds with a humanitarian spirit, and you are in our eyes a “just and righteous man” to the city of Hangzhou.”

The National Government of China awarded Sturton a Medal of Honor in the 1930s for saving the lives of more than 1,000 Chinese soldiers during the war with Japan, including the lives of soldiers from the 88th Division from Hangchow.

Sturton is referred to as “杭州的拉貝” (Rabe of Hangchow). Rabe is a reference to John Rabe, who saved 250,000 Chinese citizens during the Japanese invasion.
