= HMS Indian =

Three vessels of the Royal Navy have been named HMS Indian or Indian:

- English ship Indian (1654) was a 44-gun ship captured in 1654 and sold in 1659.
- HMS Indian (1805) was an 18-gun Bermuda-class ship-sloop launched in 1805 and sold in 1817 to become a whaler.
- HMS Indian (1855) was a survey schooner purchased in 1855 and sold in around 1859.

== See also ==
- SS India
