= John Richard Wolfe =

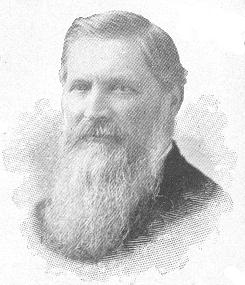
- Wolfe, about 1904
- Born: 1832; Skibbereen, County Cork, Ireland
- Died: 2 December 1915 (aged 82–83); Fuzhou, Fujian, China
- Education: Church Missionary Society College, Islington
- Occupation: Missionary
- Spouse: Mary Ann Maclehose (m. 1864; died 1913)
- Children: 6
- Parent(s): Richard Wolfe & Susan Croston

John Richard Wolfe (1832-1915) was an Irish missionary serving with the Church Missionary Society in Fuzhou, China from 1862 to 1915.

== Biography ==
Wolfe was born in 1832 near Skibbereen, County Cork, Ireland, which at that time was part of Great Britain.

He entered the Church Missionary Society College, Islington, London in 1857. In 1861 he was ordained a deacon at St Paul's Cathedral and in December of that year he sailed for Hong Kong from where he was assigned as a missionary minister to Fuzhou, Fujian. He was ordained a priest at St John's Cathedral, Hong Kong, in 1863.

Wolfe spent the rest of his life in Fuzhou until his death in 1915. He is described as "the chief instrument in the remarkable ingathering in the Fuh-kien Province." He was made Archdeacon of Fuzhou in 1887 and Vice-President of the CMS in 1910. He was the first and only Vice-President not to be a Bishop.

Wolfe translated a number of works into the local dialect including the Book of Common Prayer, several catechisms, the Gospel of St Matthew, and the Book of Joshua. He was responsible for the building of a number of churches and schools in Fuzhou and other centres across Fukien.

In 1864 Wolfe married Mary Ann Maclehose in Hong Kong. She predeceased him in 1913. Of their family of three boys and three girls, the girls Minnie, Annie and Amy all became missionaries and served in Fuzhou. His son Charles received medical training and worked in hospitals in the city.

== See also ==
- Christ Church, Cangxia – former Anglican cathedral in Fuzhou built in honour of Wolfe
