= Robert Henry Cobbold =

Robert Henry Cobbold (Chinese: 哥伯播义) (1816, Eye, Suffolk - 1893 Hereford ) was an Anglican missionary who worked with William Russell at the Church Missionary Society in China in Ningbo, China.

He and Russell left for China in November 1847, arriving in Ningbo, where they started work with the assistance of Mary Ann Aldersey.

== Publications ==
- 1862 The Christian Governess
- Pictures of the Chinese, Drawn by Themselves

Several of his works were printed in Chinese:

- 1856 Exhortations for the Age (pinyin: Ch'uan-shih-wen,)
