= John Eyre (evangelical minister) =

English evangelical clergyman (1754-1803

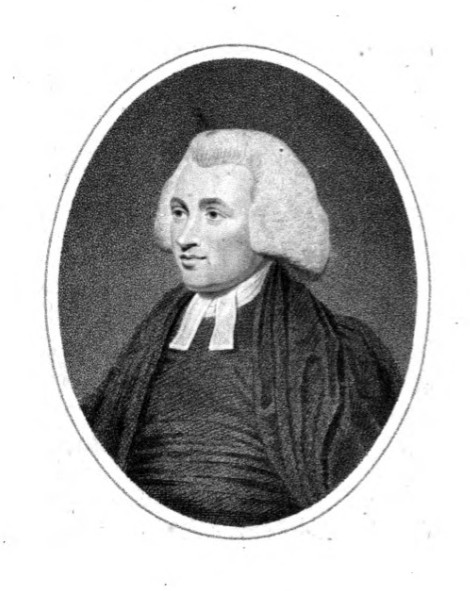
- John Eyre, 1794 engraving

Personal life
- Born: January 1754 Bodmin, Cornwall, England
- Died: March 1803 (aged 48–49) Homerton, London
- Resting place: Homerton Chapel, London
- Spouse: Mary Keene
- Parent: John Eyre (father)

Religious life
- Religion: Evangelicalism

John Eyre (January 1754 – 28/29 March 1803) was an English evangelical clergyman. He helped in establishing some of the major national evangelical institutions.

== Early life ==
The son of John Eyre of Bodmin, he was born there in January 1754, and baptised on 25 February. He was educated in classics by the Rev. John Fisher, master of Bodmin grammar school, and in mathematics by the Rev. Joseph Thorpe, rector of Forrabury and Trevalga, Cornwall, in his private school at Forrabury. When fifteen years old he was apprenticed to Mr. Oliver, a clothier of Tavistock; and soon afterwards began preaching in the town. At the end of his apprenticeship he returned to his father's business at Bodmin, and preached in the town hall.

Eyre's father did not agree with his religious work and expelled him from home.

Through a friend Eyre was able to enter Trevecca College, and with the Countess of Huntingdon's Connexion he ministered at Tregony, Cornwall, Lincoln, and Mulberry Gardens Chapel, London. Working among the dissenters, he also desired to take orders in the Church of England, and he matriculated at Emmanuel College, Cambridge, in 1778. On 30 May 1779 he was ordained deacon by Robert Lowth, and on 19 December 1779 he was advanced to the priesthood by Thomas Thurlow. He was made curate at Weston in 1779, curate of St Giles at Reading in 1781 and Curate of St Luke's Chelsea in 1782.

== In Hackney ==
About the end of 1785 year Eyre was appointed minister of Homerton, often then called Ram's Chapel after its founder. Among the congregation members were Mary Ann Aldersey and her family. Eyre also opened a school at Well Street, Hackney. Robert Aspland was one of his pupils, and Daniel Wilson another.

The Evangelical Magazine was planned by Eyre, and he edited and contributed to its early volumes; profits were used to support ministers’ widows. It was a joint venture of Church of England and dissenting ministers, with the first number appearing in July 1793. He was one of the founders of the London Missionary Society (1794–5). He encouraged Edward Hanson in establishing a dissenting academy at Idle, about 1800. A scheme originated in 1796 by Eyre and others to sending out evangelical preachers into the counties south of London, and from this arose Hackney Theological College, opened in 1803. William Jay noted how Eyre, a Calvinist in theology, was asked to preach at John Wesley's chapel in Moorfields, and gave no offence.

== Death ==
After a long illness Eyre died on 28 or 29 March 1803, and was buried in a vault on the south side of the communion-table in Homerton Chapel, 5 April. His funeral sermon was preached by Rowland Hill. In November 1785 he had married Mary Keene, from near Reading; she died at Well Street, Hackney, 20 June 1827, aged 69, and was buried by her husband's side on 29 June.

Eyre's sermon at the opening of Cheshunt College was published, with related documents, in 1792. A memoir of Eyre by George Collison appeared in the Evangelical Magazine for June and July 1803.

== Publications ==
Union and friendly intercourse recommended among such of the various denominations of Calvinists, and the members of the late Mr. Wesley's societies, as agree in the essential truths of the Gospel (1798)
