= Christ Church, Cangxia =

Former Anglican cathedral in Fuzhou, Fujian

- 苍霞基督堂
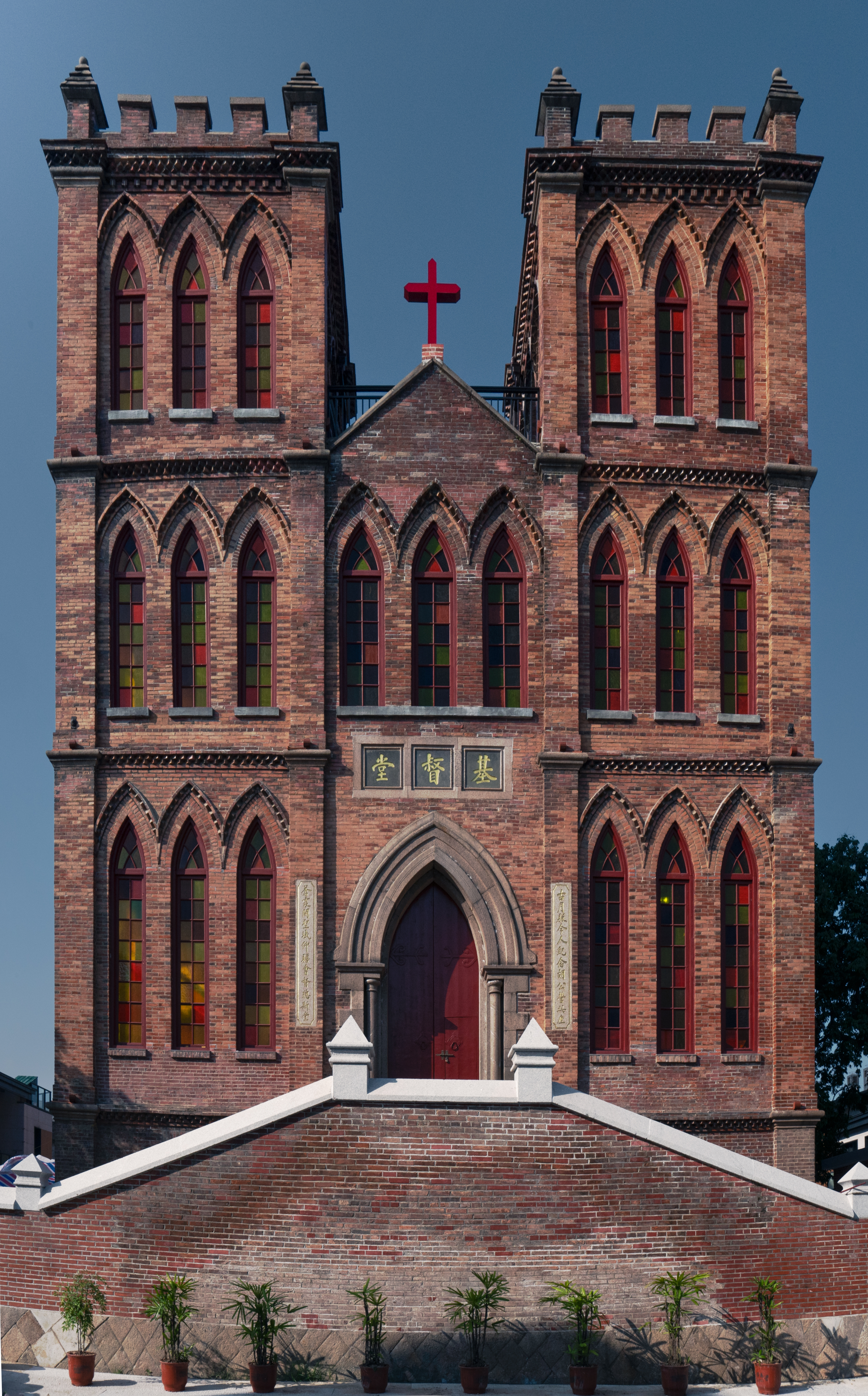
- Front façade of the cathedral in 2024, showing Neo-Gothic design
- Christ Church, Cangxia
- 26°3′10.055″N 119°18′14.724″E
- Country: China
- Denomination: Anglican Church in China (1927–1950s); Protestant (1950s–)

History
- Founded: 1870

Architecture
- Style: Neo-Gothic
- Years built: 1924–1927
- Construction cost: US$100,000

Administration
- Diocese: Diocese of Fukien (1927–1950s)

Christ Church (Note: Chinese: 苍霞基督堂; pinyin: Cāngxiá Jīdū Táng. Also known as Christ Church Cathedral from 1927 to the 1950s.) is a Protestant place of worship in Cangxia, Fuzhou, Fujian, China. Upon its completion in 1927, it became the cathedral of the Diocese of Fukien (Fujian) of the Anglican Church in China. It was closed during the Cultural Revolution and reopened in 1985.

== History ==
Anglicanism first entered Fujian in 1830 during the Qing dynasty. The congregation of Christ Church was first established in 1870. In 1882, the Church of England purchased an old tea storage house at 1 Yixiaqiao (倚霞桥) and turned it into a church building.

In 1906, the Diocese of Fukien (Fujian) was established within the Church of England, with Horace MacCartie Eyre Price as its inaugural bishop. In 1919, the diocesan synod resolved to rebuild the church into its cathedral. John Hind laid the foundation stone on 1 November 1924, and Sa Zhenbing, governor of Fujian, gave an address. The new cathedral was completed on 13 November 1927. The construction cost was US$100,000. According to Frances Slater, the cathedral was also built to commemorate John Richard Wolfe, an Anglican missionary in Fuzhou.

After the People's Republic of China was established in 1949, members of the Diocese of Fukien (Fujian) first signed "The Christian Manifesto" in 1950 at the cathedral. On 30 July 1951, at an evening gathering at the cathedral, the diocese declared to severe its ties with the Church of England. In 1956, Howard Mowll, the Anglican Primate of Australia, led an Australian Anglican delegation to visit the church and attend worship. Parts of the church site was occupied by a local pharmaceutical factory in 1958, and all Christian services halted after the Cultural Revolution began in 1966. During the Cultural Revolution, the church site was entirely used by the pharmaceutical factory.

After the 3rd Plenary Session of the 11th Central Committee of the Chinese Communist Party in 1978, the church was returned to Christian use. It was reopened on 11 August 1985. In 1989, it had a congregation of about 2,000.

== Architecture ==
The church occupies a site of about 1,000 m^{2} (0.25 acres). The site has an entrance at its southeastern corner, and is surrounded by civil housing. The church building is 46.28 m (151.8 ft) long and 20.52 m (67.3 ft) wide, with a total area of 941 m^{2} (10,130 sq ft). It can host a congregation of 1,500 people. It is in Latin cross form, facing 30 degrees to the west of south.

The church is in Neo-Gothic style. It is built with bricks and timber. It has two 20.8 m (68 ft)-tall bell towers, featuring windows with pointed arches in triplets. Above the main entrance, three Chinese characters "基督堂" (lit. "Christ Church") are engraved in stone. The roof of the church is supported by triangular frames, but it used to have English hammer beams. The roof frame is 9.6 m (31 ft) from the floor.

The foundation stone is at the southeastern corner of the church. It bears the inscription:

榮歸上帝 一九二四年十一月一號諸聖日奠基者恆會督約翰

To the Glory of God. On All Saints Day, 1 November 1924. Laid by Bishop John Hind.

== Photo gallery ==
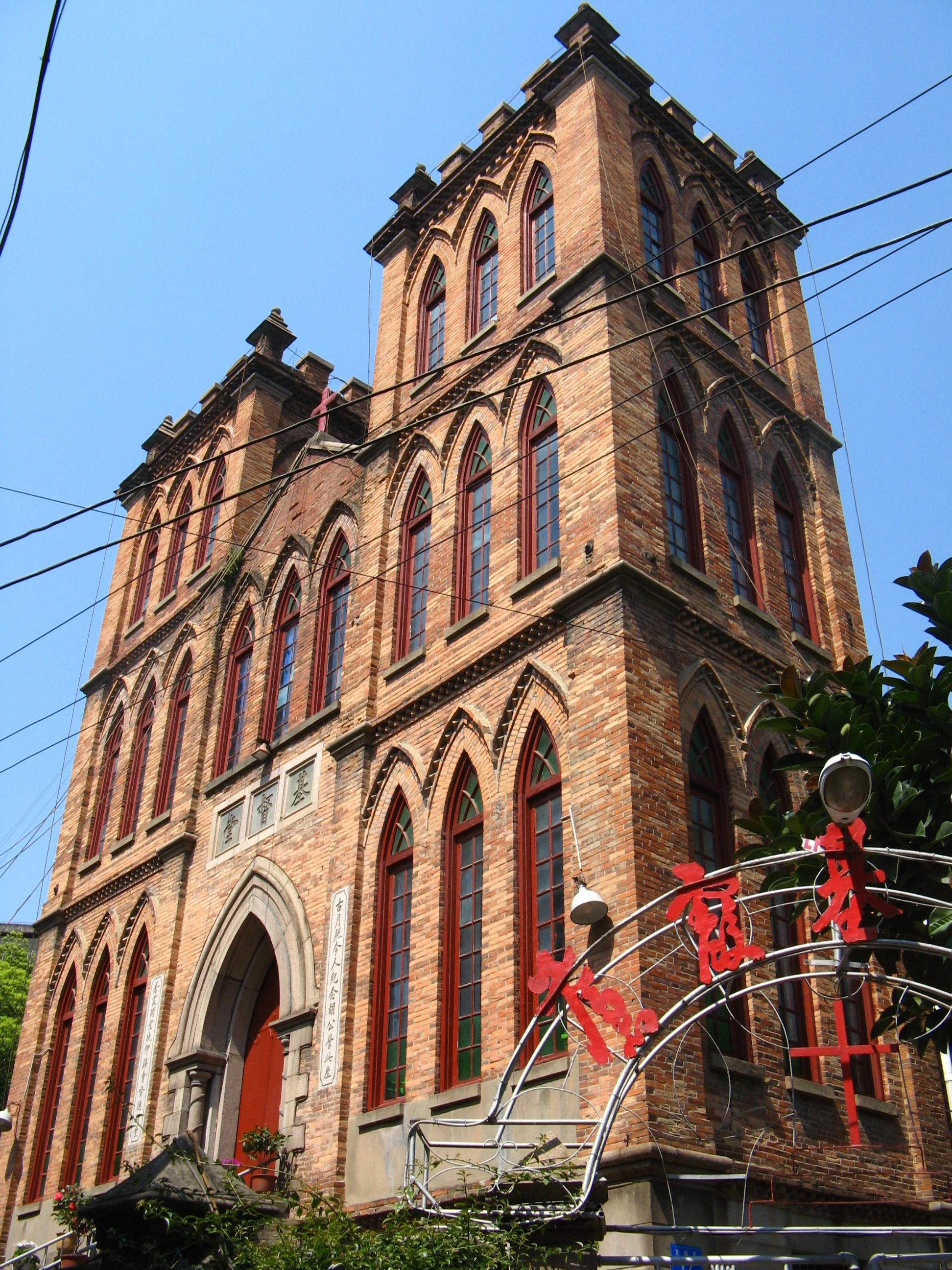
2010

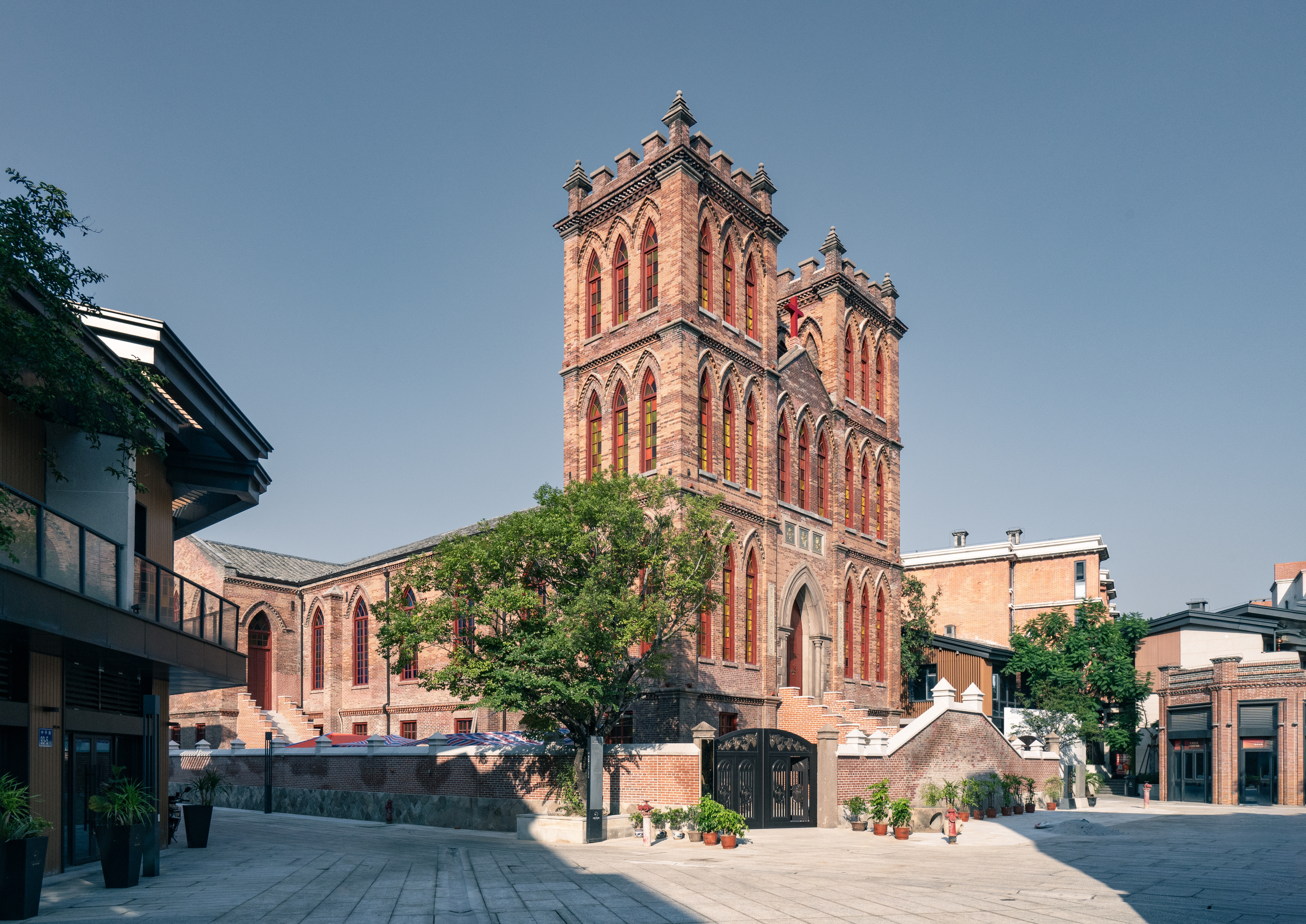
2024
