= Hubert Gordon Thompson =

English surgeon, author, photographer, and explorer (1878–1953)

Hubert Gordon Thompson M.B. Ch.B. M.D. FRCS; FRGS
- Born: 24 February 1878; Liverpool
- Died: 13 February 1953 (aged 74); Appledore, Kent
- Education: University College Liverpool
- Occupations: Surgeon and Missionary Doctor
- Medical career
- Profession: surgeon, missionary doctor, author
- Awards: Gill Memorial Award of the Royal Geographical Society presented 21 June 1926 by King George V Order of Brilliant Jade 1941

Hubert Gordon Thompson (24 February 1878 Tranmere, United Kingdom – 13 February 1953, Appledore) was an English surgeon, medical missionary, author, photographer, and explorer. Thompson established a hospital in Kunming, China, that would eventually before a modern Children's Hospital. While working in Shanghai, he performed significant medical research as well as Red Cross wartime relief work.

For his expedition in Tibet and Inner Mongolia, King George V presented Thompson with the Gill Memorial Award on behalf of the Royal Geographical Society. For his medical work in China, Thompson was awarded The Order of Brilliant Jade by President Chiang Kai-shek in 1941.

== Early life and family ==
Hubert Gordon Thompson was the second of four children born in Tranmere, Cheshire to John Albert Thompson (b. 17 April 1852); and Emma Stubley (b. 2 November 1858). His Great Uncle was Jacob Thompson a Lakeland painter.

Thompson, who called himself as H. Gordon Thompson or HGT, was one of the first "new paperboys" for the Liverpool Echo in the late 19th century. He studied medicine at University College Liverpool, where he qualified as a surgeon. Whilst at Victoria, Thompson wrote a prize-winning essay called "The Canal System of England" for which he received a medal and prize of £100 from the Cobden Club. The essay was later published by the Cobden Club in 1902.

After qualifying, Thompson had a surgical practice in Sefton Park, Liverpool. On 9 December 1909 he qualified with the Royal College of Surgeons as both MRCS and FRCS.

== Medical qualifications ==
- Liverpool College, Victoria University Manchester M.B., Ch.B., 1903
- Liverpool College, Victoria University Manchester Holt Fellow of Physiology, 1903–04
- Gee Fellow in Anatomy, 1904–05, in the University of London Scholarship 26 July 1904
- Assistant Lecturer in Anatomy in the University of Liverpool, 1905
- House Surgeon, General Hospital, Birmingham, 1905
- Liverpool University: M.D. 1906

== Missionary work in China ==
=== Beihai ===
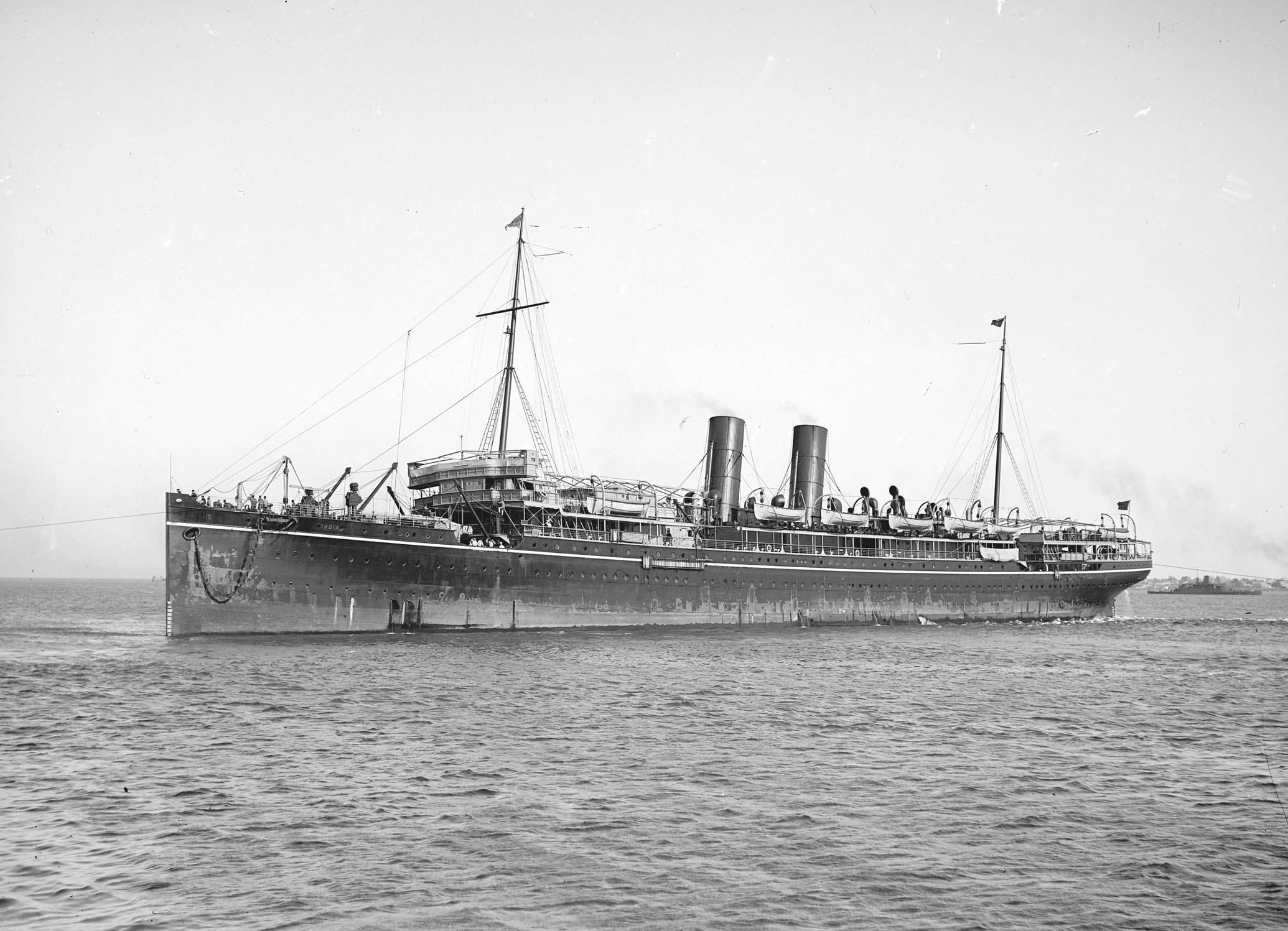
S.S India

In 1906, Thompson signed on as a ship's doctor on the SS India (P&O line) so that he could voyage from London to Hong Kong. During the voyage, he ran into Dr. Neville Bradley, a passenger who was a classmate from medical school in Liverpool

Bradley told Thompson that he needed a surgeon to work with him in Beihai (Pakhoi) in Guangxi province. The Church Missionary Society (CMS) was operating a hospital and Leper Asylum, a settlement village for leprosy patients there. Thompson agreed to take the job. Once the ship docked in Hong Kong, the two doctors travelled to Pakhoi Mission.

Over the years, Thompson's work at the Po Yan (Puren) hospital was described in several published reports to CMS. In January 1912 Thompson presented a paper entitled "Surgical Work In South China" to the Second Biennial Congress of the Far Eastern Association of Tropical Medicine in Hong Kong.

On 1 Jul 1912 Thompson married Amy Constance Bradley at St. Luke's Church in Beihai, one hundred leprosy patients attended the wedding. In 1913 their first son, John Frederick was born in Beihai.

=== Yunnan Fu (Kunming) ===
In 1915, CMS asked Thompson to start a hospital at Yunnan Fu (Kunming) He travelled there first to investigate and later he was joined by his wife Amy and son John. They had to travel by boat to Haiphong in French Indochina and then by train to Yunnan Fu.

Initially Thompson rented an old house in the city. He posted a notice saying that Western medicine was practiced there and immediately started receiving patients. The house was built around two courtyards. The family lived in the inner courtyard. The outer courtyard served as a surgery, where Thompson saw patients.

Thompson's second son, Arthur Gordon, was born in Yunnan Fu in 1915. followed by a daughter, Greta Constance, in 1917 and a son, Peter Hubert, in 1921.

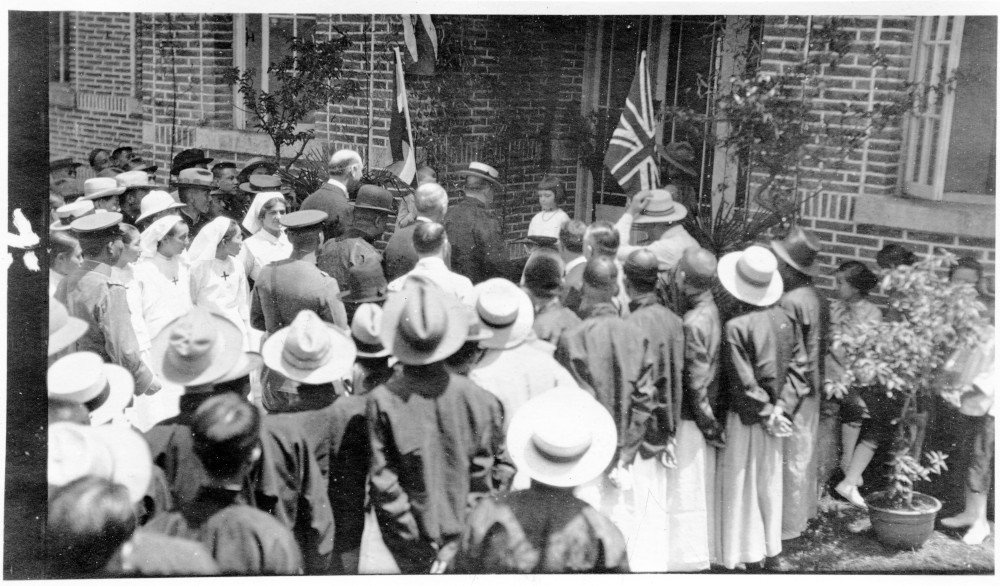
Governor Tang Jiyao arriving at opening of Hui Tien hospital. H. Gordon Thompson's daughter, Greta, aged 4, presenting the key to the hospital.

Thompson eventually bought some land for the hospital outside Yunnan Fu. The new Hui Tien hospital was founded in 1920 and formally opened in 1921 by the Military Governor of Yunnan Tang Jiyao. It is now called the Kunming Children's Hospital.

In March 1922, Thompson, acting on behalf of the French, British and Japanese consuls, sought to negotiate a ceasefire between two local warlords, Marshall Ting Jiyao and General Gu Pinzhen (part of the Yunnan clique). The two men were fighting for control of Yunnan-Fu and the surrounding province.

=== Mianzhou ===
In 1948, CMS asked Thompson to work at a hospital in Mianzhou in Sichuan province, and he and Amy travelled to Hong Kong. Once there, they attended the wedding of their daughter, Greta, and Rev Eric Hague at St John's Anglican Cathedral. From Hong Kong. they travelled overland to Mianzhou.

=== Hangzhou ===
In 1925 CMS asked Thompson was asked by CMS to go to Hangzhou in Zhejiang province to take over the medical school there. It was one of the earliest hospitals and medical schools in China, having been started by Dr David Duncan Main in 1885. Today, it is called the 2nd Affiliated Hospital, Zhejiang University School of Medicine. By1926, the Kwang Chi Hospital was serving 3,000 inpatients and 60,000 outpatients a year with over 1,000 major operations.

In 1926, after a long period of warlord battles, the Thompson family, patients and hospital staff were forced to evacuate to Shanghai and the Kwang Chi hospital was ransacked.

=== Shanghai ===
==== New position ====
As refugees in Shanghai, Thompson and his family first rented a house in Rue Massenet in the French Concession, sharing it with a few other missionaries. They later moved to their own house in the Avenue du Roi Albert, also in the French Concession. The children attended the St John's Anglican Cathedral school.

After arriving in Shanghai, Thompson joined the Henry Lester Institute of Medical Research under the leadership of Dr Herbert Earle and an independent Board of Governors. Thompson was appointed as Director of Surgical Research and Head of Surgery. He led the surgical team and did investigative work on the appendix, its development and its treatment.

In 1927, Thompson briefly returned to Hangzhou to reopen the Kwang Chi Hospital. He also helped organise Red Cross relief work there, including a Red Cross ship that served casualties from both sides.

"Dr. H. Gordon Thompson, the former Medical Superintendent of the hospital, deserves a large measure of praise for his patient and tactful dealing with this serious situation, and it is largely owing to his quiet efforts that the hospital was ultimately restored".

==== Family relocation ====
In 1927 Thompson's wife, Amy, became ill and had to undergo an operation. She returned to England with their two eldest children, John and Arthur, to recuperate. Greta and Peter remained in Shanghai with their father. In 1929, Thompson and the two younger children returned by ship to the United Kingdom. He later returned alone to Shanghai

On his return to Shanghai, Thompson moved into a flat at the YMCA in Shanghai. During his years in Shanghai, he would travel to England once a year on the Trans-Siberian Railway. This involved two weeks on the train, two weeks in England and then two weeks back on the train to Shanghai. Whenever he was in the UK he would give talks and seek to raise funds for medical aid to China.

==== Research work ====
Thompson continued his clinical research work at The Henry Lister Institute. In 1934 he jointly presented a paper on "Some Surgical Complications of Parasitic Diseases" with J. Gray at the 9th Congress of the Far Eastern Association of Tropical Medicine in Nanjing. He also published a paper in the British Medical Journal entitled "The Lymphoid Tissue Of The Alimentary Canal".

The China Inland Mission (C.I.M.) asked Thompson to edit a "Health Manual for Missionaries in China". This manual was sent to every Member and Associate of the C.I.M. and to every CMS missionary and the Church of England Zenana Missionary Society (C.E.Z.M.S.) missionaries.

With the Japanese invasion of China in 1937, Thompson helped organise Red Cross work in Shanghai. Before the year was over, he traveled by train to the United Kingdom.

== Exploration ==
=== Trip to Tibet and Inner Mongolia ===
In 1923 Thompson joined Brig. Gen. George Pereira on a mapping expedition along the borders of Tibet and Inner Mongolia.

The expedition traversed the Mekong River and the Yangtze River, then crossed the Qinghai-Tibetan plateau. On the East side of Kanze (Garzê), Periera died of peritonitis. Thompson decided to continue the expedition, mapping and taking photographs. The party reached the Labrang Monastery, then travelled to Lanzhou. Their next stop was Ningxia, followed by a traverse of the Ordos plateau.

=== Capture by bandits ===
As the expedition was approaching Baotou, Thompson was captured by bandits. The bandits sent out a ransom demand for $10.000 cash, 150 rifles, 50 automatic pistols, four machine-guns, and control of a district. While waiting for an answer, the captors kept moving Thompson to different locations, always traveling at night. At one point, Thompson feigned a hunger strike, saying he could only eat Western food.

The hunger strike ploy managed to alert the military Governor of Ningxia, General Ma Fuxiang and his chief of staff Colonel Chao to Thompson's location. They facilitated his escape from the bandits. After spending two nights travelling along the frozen Yellow River, Thompson reached Baotou.

Thompson then took the train to Beijing. where he reported on his expedition to Sir Ronald Macleay G.C.M.G., the British Ambassador. Thompson then travelled via Shanghai to Hong Kong where he was reunited with his family. From there, they returned to Yunnan-Fu. In total, the journey of about 2,500 miles had lasted 196 days.

== United Kingdom ==
=== Royal Geographical Society ===
In 1925, while in the United Kingdom on furlough, Thompson delivered a lecture about his China expedition to the Royal Geographical Society in London.

In 1926, Thompson's lecture was published in full in The Geographical Journal. His story and many of his pictures were also published in The Illustrated London News.

On 31 March 1926, Thompson was awarded the Gill Memorial Award by King George V on behalf of the Royal Geographical Society.

=== Lord Mayor's Mansion House Fund ===
In December 1937, Thompson helped establish the Lord Mayor's Mansion House Fund for the Relief of Hardship in China, becoming the Hon. Secretary and Treasurer. He travelled across England, Wales, Scotland and Northern Ireland speaking at public meetings to raise awareness and funds. Thompson submitted letters, articles and appeals in many national and local newspapers

In 1939 with the outbreak of World War II, the Lord Mayor's Fund for aid to China was renamed as The British Fund for the Relief of Distress in China. The Lord Mayor remained its Patron and Thompson continued his role of Hon. Secretary.

In February 1940 Thompson spoke at a meeting in support of the Fund that was chaired by the Chinese Ambassador Guo Taiqi. It was attended by E.A. Benians, and W. J. Wing.

In 1941 Thompson was awarded the Order of Brilliant Jade by President Chiang Kai-Shek for his Red Cross work in China and for the relief fund in the United Kingdom.

Thompson spoke on two broadcasts on the BBC Home Service in 1941 and 1942. On the 1941 broadcast, Thompson spoke in support of an appeal by Mme Chiang Kai-Shek whom he had met when she was a nurse in China. The fund raised over £150,000 in addition to donations of ambulances, medical equipment, blankets, and food. These items were shipped to China free of charge

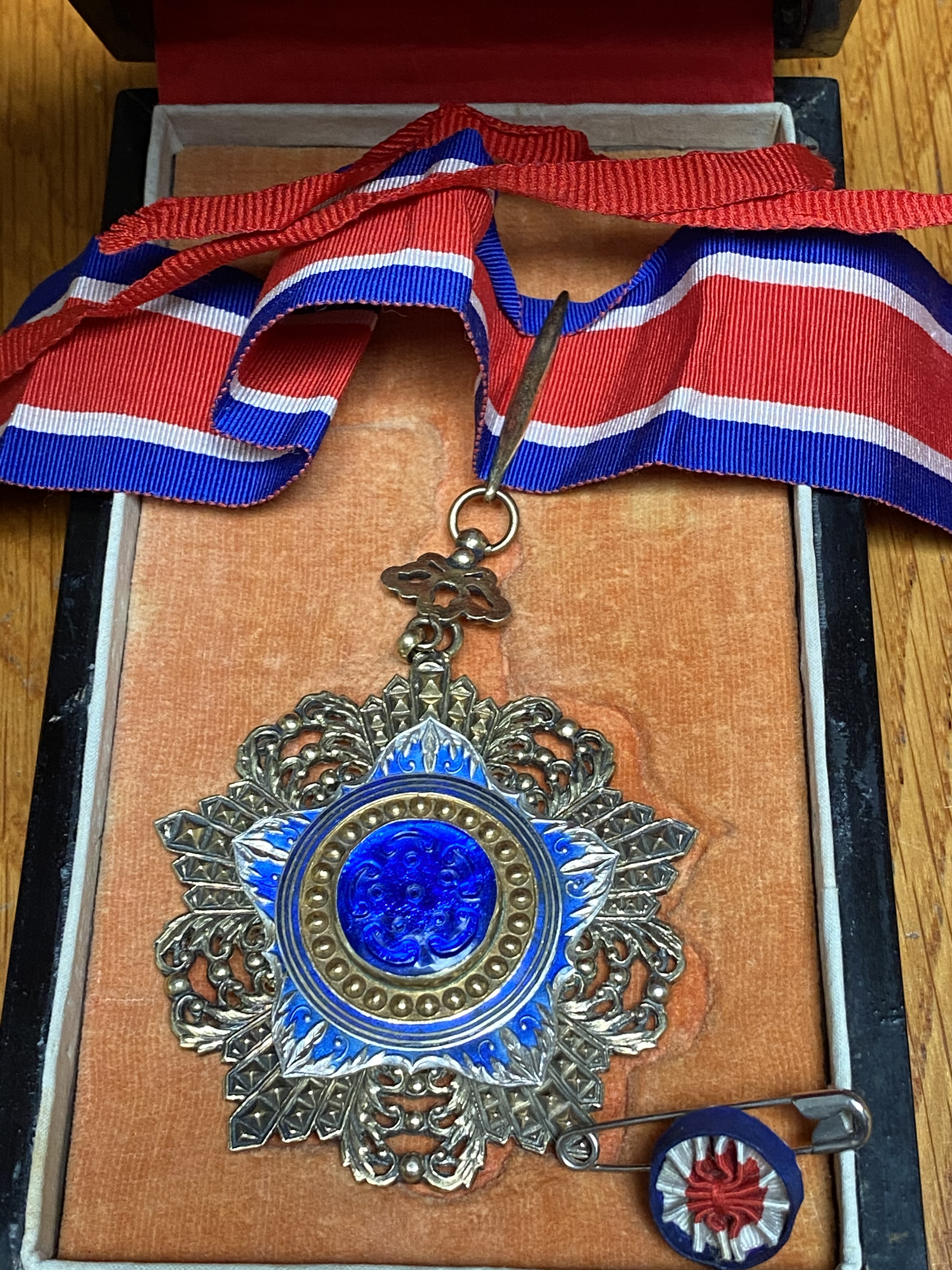
Order of The Brilliant Jade Medal and Lapel Pin

== Legacy and death ==
While in Mianzhou, Thompson was diagnosed with Parkinson's disease. This forced him to return to the United Kingdom in 1950.

Thompson died in 1953 at Appledore, near Ashford in Kent.

== Postscript ==
In 2011, the Beihai People's Hospital (the former Po Yan Hospital), celebrated its 125th anniversary. The hospital invited Thompson's daughter, Dr. Greta Hague, as a guest of honour at the ceremony in Beihai

The ceremony acknowledged H. Gordon Thompson's founding contributions to the Beihai People's Hospital. He was featured in the new hospital museum.

Author Liu Xisong wrote two books on the hospital history.

- The First Domestic Leper Hospital: Rediscovering the History of Pakhoi Po Yan Leper Hospital
- The Smile of the Goddess of Lanterns: A brief history of nursing care in Beihai Puren Hospital
