= Wu Yun An =

Wu Yun An or Yun-An Wu (Chinese: 吳雲庵, October 25, 1897 - April 18, 1993) was a Chinese medical doctor, a Major General in the Chinese Army and Deputy Surgeon General of the Republic of China from 1945 to 1947, under Gen. Dr. Robert Kho-Seng Lim. In addition, from 1926 to 1928, Dr. Wu was head of public health at Whampoa Military Academy (Chinese: 黃埔軍校).

Dr. Wu graduated from Church Missionary Society Kwang Chi Medical School (Chinese: 大英廣濟醫學專門學校) in 1919 with degrees in clinical medicine (MB, ChB).

== See also ==
- List of Christian Hospitals in China
