= Church Missionary Society College, Islington =

Coordinates: 51°32′18.26″N 0°6′7.41″W

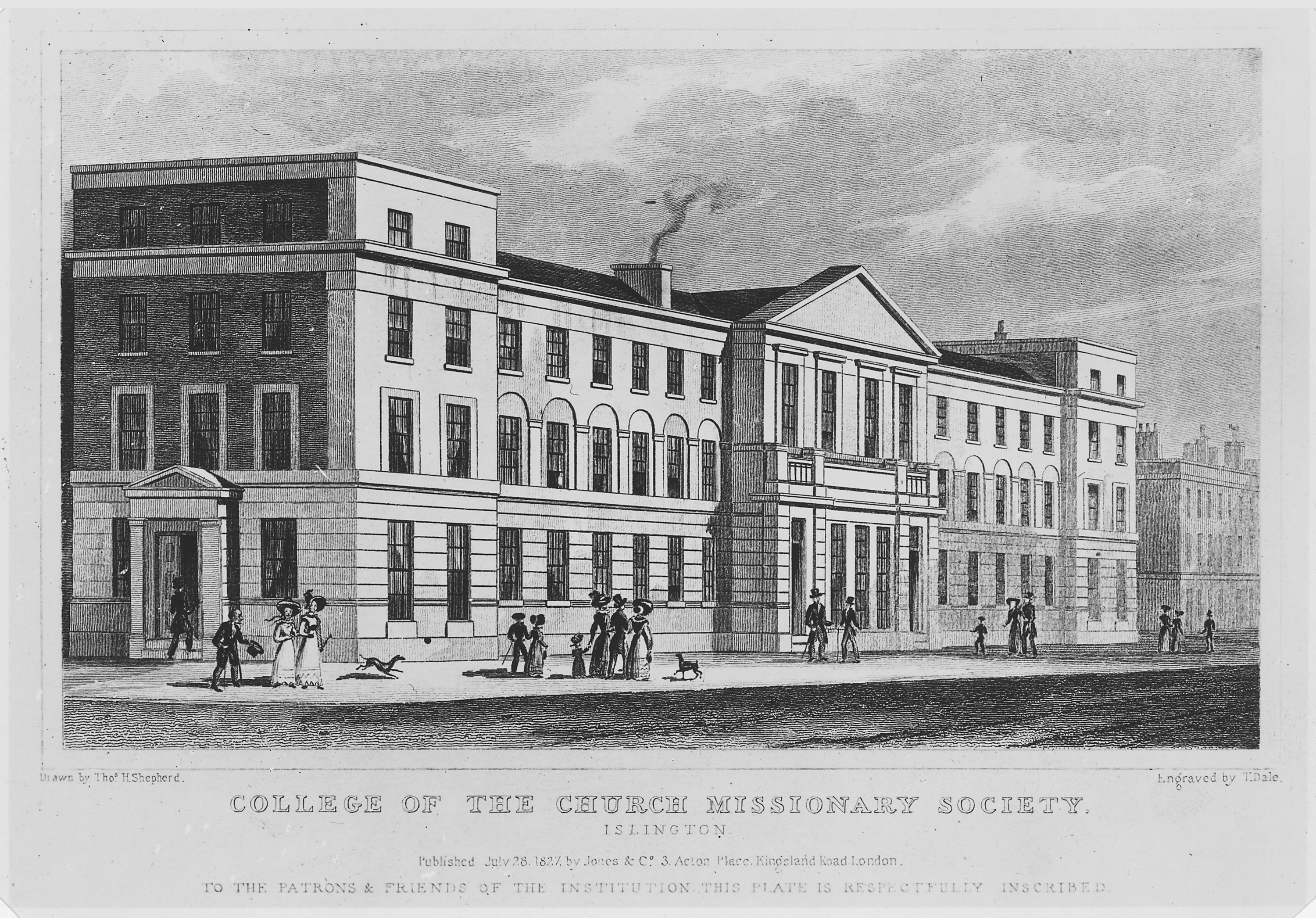
College of the Church Missionary Society, Islington

The Church Missionary Society Training College in Islington, north London was founded in 1820 to prepare Anglican missionaries of the Church Missionary Society for work overseas. Prior to the establishment of the College the CMS missionaries received their training under Thomas Scott.

== Location ==
Initially the college operated out of the family home of the Revd. Edward Bickersteth, but by 1825 the college had moved to purpose-built accommodation in Upper Street, Islington with classrooms and living accommodation for students and a professional staff. The new premises was designed to teach around 20 students to pass bishops' ordination examinations, tutoring them in Latin, Greek, English composition, sermon writing, and Divinity.

== Activities ==
By 1894, the Church Missionary Society College had trained about 600 missionaries.

The growth of training establishments overseas, widened university access and the start of the First World War led to the college's closure in 1915.

== Principals ==
- the Rev. J. N. Pearson (1825–38)
- the Rev. C. F. Childe (1838–58)
- the Rev. T. Green (1858–70)
- the Rev. A. H. Frost (1870–74)
- the Rev. W. H. Barlow (1875–82)
- the Rev. T. W. Drury (1882–99)

== Alumni and faculty of the College ==
- William Banister, Anglican missionary and bishop; alumnus
- Sir John Sandys, classical scholar, instructor and Fellow of St John's College, Cambridge; alumnus
