= James Galt (missionary) =

Scottish medical missionary

James Galt (20 February 1846 – 5 June 1922) was a Scottish medical missionary under the Church Mission Society. He is best known for founding the Church Missionary Society's opium hospital in Hangzhou, (Hangchow) China in 1871. The hospital continued to be operational and influential past 1948 and contained a medical school.

== Personal life ==
=== Early life and education ===
Galt was born in Dunino, Scotland around 20 February 1846 Willm Bernick and Janet Couper, who were farmers. Galt then went on to study medicine in Edinburgh.

=== Marriage and family ===
Galt married Elizabeth Walker (Lizzie) on 7 September 1871. Galt, Lizzie, and their three children lived in Hangchow while Galt completed his service. However, Lizzie died at sea on her way home from Hangchow on a ship called the Achilles on 30 December 1878. Galt remarried his late wife's sister, Jessie G Galt. Between his two wives, Galt had five children. His two eldest sons and eldest daughter, William, David, and Jessie, were born as English citizens in China. His first daughter with Jessie, born in the U.K., was named after his late wife Lizzie. He lived in Cottingham, England until he died on 5 June 1922, at the age of 75 and was buried in Vicarsford Cemetery in Forgan, Scotland.

== Mission ==
At the time, Hangchow was estimated to have 26 million residents, and had been ravaged by the Taiping Rebellion. The land was reportedly burned, with mass evacuation of its people and all business halted. Missionary work had preceded the rebellion in the form of then Bishop of Victoria John Burdon's work in 1859. However, this work was halted and destroyed in the midst of the violence. Missionary work was restarted in 1864 with the work of two native residents of Hangchow known as Miao and Dzang.

Galt journeyed to Hangchow in 1871. He first studied the language and the people before establishing the hospital and beginning his 8 ¾ years of service for the Church Missionary Society. Records from the time indicate Galt and his co-worker, Rev. A. E. Moule, had their patience tested time and time again while operating the hospital. However, in accordance with the Society's hope the two would stay on task, Moule wrote, "Dr. Galt, in addition to medical skill and devotion to his professional work, uses every opportunity for bringing the Gospel home to his patients, and he possesses patience and kindness, which are not unnoticed by the heathen who come under his influence."

== Legacy ==
After founding the hospital in Hangzhou, Galt's work was later expanded by David Duncan Main, who created a medical school within the hospital. Main wrote reports back to the Church Missionary Society about Galt's hospital, including, "Life is too short to tell you about the thousands of out-patients and over a thousand in-patients[...]" Major issues faced by the hospital included scarlet and dengue fever. Furthermore, the hospital reported conducting baptisms, thus working toward the religious missionary's goal of spreading Christianity.

Eventually, the hospital was taken over by the Japanese during the country's pre-World War II expansions in 1937. Records of the hospital's existence and functionality exist beyond 1948.
