= James Joseph Meadows =

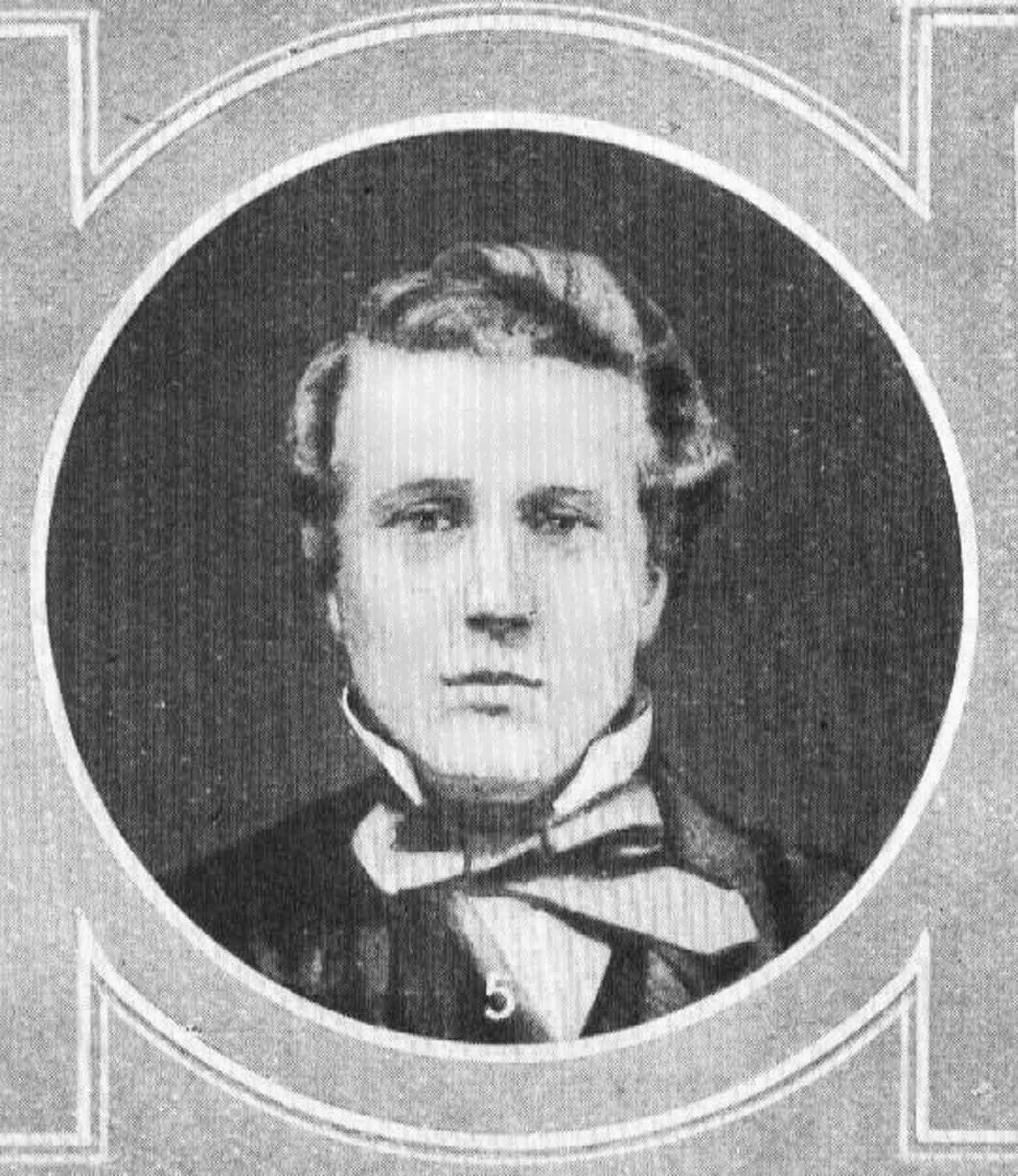
- Missionary to China
- Born: 1 September 1835; Norfolk, England
- Died: 12 December 1914 (aged 79); England

James Joseph Meadows

Meadows with Elizabeth and their children

Elizabeth (Rose) Meadows

James Joseph Meadows (1 September 1835 – 12 December 1914) was a Protestant Christian missionary to China and one of the first missionaries with the China Inland Mission.

Meadows was converted to Christianity at Perth, Scotland. He later lived at Barnsley, Yorkshire.

Meadows and his wife, Martha, sailed for China aboard the Challenger on 8 January 1862 and arrived at Shanghai on 24 May. They were at first unconnected to any organized mission agency, as Hudson Taylor's first recruits for the "Ningbo Mission" which three years later became the China Inland Mission. Their first field of work was in Ningbo maintaining the missionary work with missionary John Jones and Edward Clemens Lord at the Bridge Street premises, while awaiting reinforcements from England.

Martha died suddenly at Ningbo in 1863, and Meadows later proposed marriage by letter to her friend, Elizabeth Rose. Upon Miss Rose's arrival with the Lammermuir Party at Shanghai on 30 September 1866, the couple were married in October 1866 in Ningbo. Elizabeth Meadows died on 3 November 1890.

Meadows was away from China on furlough between 1871 and 1874, and between May 1895 and November 1896. He died of cancer in 1914.

== Quote ==
“I have just got up from my knees. I have been weeping at the feet of Jesus because I cannot learn the dialect quick enough. Tens of thousands of souls are perishing all around me, and I cannot tell them about the Saviour.”

== See also ==
- List of China Inland Mission missionaries in China
