= William Banister =

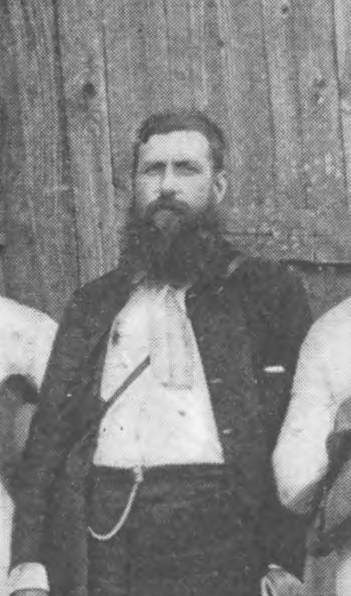
- Born: 31 May 1855
- Died: 26 February 1928 (aged 72)
- Alma mater: Church Missionary Society College, Islington
- Occupation: Priest, writer

William Banister was a missionary of the Anglican Church.

He was born in Walton-le-Dale on 31 May 1855, educated at the Church Missionary Society College, Islington and ordained in 1879. He was curate at Balderstone, Lancashire before heading to China as a missionary, rising in time to be Archdeacon of Hong Kong. In 1909 he became Bishop of Kwangsi-Hunan China, a post he held until his retirement in 1923. He died on 26 February 1928
