= International Campus, Zhejiang University =

Campus in Haining, Zhejiang, China

International Campus of Zhejiang University
- 浙江大学海宁国际校区 (国际联合学院)
- Motto: 求是创新
- Motto in English: Seeking Truth and Pursuing Innovation
- Type: Public
- Established: August 16, 2016; 10 years ago
- Parent institution: Zhejiang University
- Academic affiliations: C9, APRU, IAU, GUNi, YDUA, BRICS Universities League
- Budget: CN¥ 26.1 billion (2022)
- Students: 2,936
- Undergraduates: 1,696
- Postgraduates: 975
- Doctoral students: 335
- Location: 718 East Haizhou Road, Haining, Zhejiang, 314400, China; 30.520833°N 120.721667°E
- Campus: 67 hectares (170 acres)
- Language: Chinese, English
- Website: www.intl.zju.edu.cn

The Zhejiang University Haining International Campus is an educational institution located in Haining, Zhejiang Province, China. Established in 2016, it is a component of Zhejiang University's global outreach strategy.

As an extension of Zhejiang University, one of China's top-tier research universities, the Haining International Campus offers a range of academic programs across various disciplines, including science, engineering, humanities, social sciences, and management.

The institution engages in partnerships with academic institutions and industry partners worldwide.

== History ==
=== 2013 ===
In 2013, Zhejiang University began the process of establishing its International Campus in Haining, China. This endeavor received official support from the Ministry of Education and approval from the Zhejiang Provincial Government. Key agreements were signed with the People's Government of Haining. These efforts led to the creation of the Zhejiang University Haining International Campus.

=== 2014 ===
Zhejiang University started building its International Campus on June 30th, following an announcement on March 25th about its establishment. Song Yonghua was appointed as Dean, Ying Yibin as Executive Dean, and Fu Qiang as Secretary of the Party Working Committee and Vice Dean.

=== 2016 - 2024 ===
From 2016 to 2017, Zhejiang University's International Campus underwent significant developments. On August 16, 2016, the first phase of construction was completed, allowing faculty and staff to move to Haining. Shortly after, on March 15, 2017, the International Campus officially commenced its operations. Earlier in 2017, on February 1, the Ministry of Education approved the establishment of the ZJU-UoE Institute and the ZJU-UIUC Institute, marking a crucial milestone for the campus.

Between 2018 and 2024, the International Campus continued to expand and evolve. On December 21, 2018, the International Joint Innovation Center of Zhejiang University was established, followed by the initiation of the International Business School on October 11, 2018. On May 30, 2019, the construction of an international collaborative education model was included in the Yangtze River Delta regional development outline, highlighting the strategic importance of the campus.

The year 2020 saw further advancements with the formal establishment of the International Business School on November 4, and the inception of the Yangtze River Delta International Graduate School on October 23. By September 19, 2022, the National Development and Reform Commission, Ministry of Education, and Ministry of Science and Technology had issued the Construction Plan for Zhejiang University International Campus in Haining.

== Campus ==
The campus is a collaborative project between the university and the local government. Spread over 67 hectares, the Neo-classical styled campus features buildings are made of fair-faced red bricks. Divided into three zones, residential colleges, teaching complexes, and research buildings, it sits between Lake Juanhu and Changsha River Wetland Park, offering a picturesque setting.

=== Residential colleges ===
The campus has three Residential Colleges: Weixue, Guantong, and Laitong.

Each college has its own flag and history.

Amenities in the residential colleges include fitness rooms, music band rooms, piano rooms, kitchens, cinemas, and study areas. One of the defining features of each college is its accommodation options, including single and double rooms.

=== Campus facilities ===
The sport gymnasium offers swimming, tennis, basketball, football, and squash courts. Adjacent is a fitness area equipped with a variety of sport equipment for personalized workouts. Additionally, a football field provides space for both casual matches and training sessions.

The International Campus Library has a vast collection of books and resources spanning various disciplines. Its facilities include individual carrels and group study rooms, high-speed internet and computer workstations. Staff librarians are also available. The campus canteen has a menu featuring both Chinese and Western cuisine. The cafeteria hosts communal dinners for festivals and special occasions.

Modern amenities include interactive whiteboards and comfortable armchairs.

== Academics ==
=== Teaching and learning ===
The International Campus of Zhejiang University comprises three distinguished institutions—ZIBS, ZJUI, and ZJE. There are undergraduate, postgraduate, and specialized programs.

=== University of Edinburgh Institute ===
The Zhejiang University-University of Edinburgh Institute (ZJU-UoE Institute) is a collaboration in the field of Biomedical Sciences between Zhejiang University of China and The University of Edinburgh, United Kingdom. Biomedical Sciences covers the functioning of the human body at molecular, cellular, organ and systems levels in health and disease. Biomedical scientists use knowledge gained by research across a range of related disciplines, including physiology, anatomy, pharmacology, immunology and neuroscience, and apply this knowledge to increase understanding of normal bodily functions and in the analysis of disease mechanisms.

=== University of Illinois Urbana-Champaign Institute ===
ZJU-UIUC Institute is a jointly operated engineering college on the Zhejiang University (ZJU) International Campus in Haining, China. The institute is officially approved by Chinese Ministry of Education in February 2016.

=== Zhejiang International Business School ===
Zhejiang University International Business School (ZIBS) at the Haining Campus is involved in business education and research.

=== Programs ===
(As of April 2024. See the relevant information on www.intl.zju.edu.cn)

Institute	Undergraduate Programs	Graduate Programs
ZJU-UoE Institute	Integrative Biomedical Sciences; Biomedical Informatics	PhD in Integrative Biomedical Sciences; University of Edinburgh Master by Research programme in Integrative Biomedical Sciences; University of Edinburgh PhD in Biomedical Sciences; ZJU Degree MSc Programme; ZJU degree PhD Programme
ZJU-UIUC Institute	Computer Engineering; Electrical Engineering; Mechanical Engineering; Civil Engineering	Master Degree (Professional) - Electronic Information; Master Degree(Professional) - Energy&Power; Master Degree(Professional) - Mechanical Engineering; Master Degree(Professional) - Civil & Hydraulic Engineering; Master Degree - Electrical Engineering; Master Degree(Professional) - Traffic and Transportation
ZIBS	Global Communication and Management	International Master of Finance; International Master of Data Science; Master of China Studies; International Master of Business Administration; International Master of Communication and Management; International Master of Fine Arts

== Student life ==
=== Student departments ===
Student activities are organized by the International Student Committee (ISC), including cultural festivals and academic seminars. In addition, there is a variety of student clubs covering interests such sports, arts, and other cultural pursuits.

== Transportation ==
The campus is accessible by the Hangzhou–Haining Intercity Rail. The railway line terminates just west of the south gate of the campus at International Campus, ZJU station.
