= SS India =

A number of steamships were named India, including -

- SS India (1896), a P&O liner in service 1896–1915
- SS India (1899), Operator: Sir Raylton Dixon & Co., Ltd., Middlesbrough; Operator: S. Costomeni & S. Valmadis, Syra; 2,933 tons
- SS India (1926), an Italian cargo ship sunk in 1942 by the German auxiliary cruiser Michel.
