= William Russell (bishop of North China) =

Irish Anglican missionary in China (1821–1879)

William Armstrong Russell (1821–1879) was an Irish Protestant Christian missionary to China, and served as the Anglican Bishop of North China.

Russell, son of Marcus Carew Russell, by Fanny Potts, was born at Ballydavid House, Littleton, County Tipperary, Ireland, in 1821, and was educated at Midleton School, County Cork, and at Trinity College, Dublin. He was ordained by Bishop Charles James Blomfield in 1847. As a missionary in connection with the Church Missionary Society he travelled to China in the same year with Robert Henry Cobbold, afterwards archdeacon of Ningbo. These two men were the first Protestant missionaries in Ningbo. Russell translated into the Ningbo dialect the greater part of the New Testament, portions of the Old Testament, and the Book of Common Prayer, besides writing many tracts and essays. He was appointed the first missionary bishop of North China in November 1872, and on 15 December was consecrated in Westminster Abbey. After his return to China he admitted four Chinese to deacons' and priests' orders. He also confirmed nearly three hundred Chinese Christians, and dedicated several mission churches.

in 1852 he married Mary Ann Leisk. The couple worked together on translating the Bible.

He died at Shanghai on 5 October 1879. Mary Ann continued working as a missionary until her own death in 1887.

He published The Term Question, or an Enquiry as to the Term in the Chinese Language which most nearly represents Elohim and Theos, as they are used in the Holy Scriptures,’ Shanghai, 1877.

== See also ==
- Diocese of North China

== Notes ==
Attribution

- This article incorporates text from a publication now in the public domain: "Russell, William Armstrong". Dictionary of National Biography. London: Smith, Elder & Co. 1885–1900.
