= David Duncan Main =

British doctor and missionary (1856–1934)

- Born: June 6, 1856; Ayrshire, Scotland
- Died: August 30, 1934 (aged 78); Edinburgh, Scotland
- Education: University of Glasgow; University of Edinburgh Medical School
- Known for: Hospital of Universal Benevolence, Hangzhou Medical Training College, Hangzhou Midwifery Training School, Hangshou YMCA
- Spouse: Florence Nightingale Smith
- Awards: Mandarin of the Fifth Class (1895); The Second, Third, and Fourth Decoration of the Excellent Crop (Late 1890s); Second Order with Great Sash (1925); The Chinese Red Cross Medal (1911)
- Scientific career
- Fields: Physician, Surgeon, Missionary
- Institutions: Hangzhou, China

David Duncan Main (1856–1934) was a British doctor, best known for his medical missionary work in Hangzhou, the capital of the south-eastern Chinese Province Zhejiang, during the late 1800s and early 1900s. He was superintendent of the Church Missionary Society (CMS) Medical Mission from his arrival in 1881 until 1927, and principal of the Hangzhou Medical Training College. He was also involved in the formation of the Young Men's Christian Association (YMCA) in Hangzhou, which focused on preaching the Gospel to non-Christians. Main and his wife, Florence Nightingale Smith, opened over thirty medical buildings during their time in China, as well as a centre for industrial work training.

He was characterised by his cheerful and trustworthy nature, and was one of Hangzhou's best-known missionaries, referred to as "Dr. Apricot." His contributions included the Hospital of Universal Benevolence and the Hangzhou Medical Training College. The college was one of the first medical training schools in Zhejiang, and in 1926 was given provisional registration by the China Medical Association. When he retired in 1926, the hospital was dealing with 3,000 inpatients and 60,000 outpatients per year. The hospital is now The Second Affiliated Hospital Zhejiang University School of Medicine (SAHZU) and was ranked as one of the top 100 hospitals in China in 1999.

== Early life and education (1856–1873) ==
David Duncan Main was born on 10 June 1856 in Ayrshire in western Scotland, southern Scotland.(8) He grew up the village of Kirkmichael. Throughout childhood he lived by his signature phrase, "Be good and do good." He left school at the age of 16 as head boy and medalist of his class.

In 1873, he began studying business at the University of Glasgow. Following graduation he found work at a shipping agency in Glasgow.

=== Early medical influences ===
In the spring of 1873, after a conversation with a friend about living life as a Christian, Main decided to pursue medicine. He associated himself in Glasgow with Pastor Findlay's work at the St. George's Tent Mission in early 1874. Here, he met Dwight L. Moody, the American evangelist, and his friend Ira D. Sankey the gospel singer. After attending one of Moody's speeches, Main join the revival movement, which put him in touch with medical missionaries. During his time with Findlay, he met the medical missionary Donald Morrison, and himself entered medical missionary work.

=== Medical training and early career (1874–1881) ===
Main finished his business education at Glasgow University, and then pursued medical training with support from the Edinburgh Medical Missionary Society, at the University of Edinburgh.. He also studied medicine in Glasgow, and took the Triple Qualification of the Scottish Corporations in 1881. He graduated medical school that year. During his training (1877—1881) Main with fellow students worked in the slums of Edinburgh and preached at open air meetings. With his friend Dr. Arthur Neve, Main at this period formed the Church Missionary Society (CMS) Medical Auxiliary, to interest other students in foreign service missions.

In Hangzhou, Main and his wife studied Mandarin Chinese.

== Work abroad ==
Main married Florence Nightingale Smith in 1881; she had also worked in the slums of Edinburgh, as a service woman in the Free Breakfast Mission and the Cowgate Medical Mission. Main had initially requested to be assigned work in India, but was asked to choose China, and was assigned to the Mid-China mission. Main and his wife sailed for China in September 1881, where they stayed for 46 years, returning to the United Kingdom in 1890, 1899, and 1910.

They were welcomed by Dr. James Galt and his wife, and Rev. Arthur Elwin and his wife, at Hangzhou. Upon their arrival, Hangzhou was in a poor state, the aftermath of the Taiping Rebellion of 1861. The streets were full of debris, opium was widely used, period, and some areas of the city were filled with addicts.

=== Buildings and hospitals ===
==== The Central Hospital and Opium Refuge ====
(1881)

The central hospital was the first western hospital in Zhejiang, consisting of a small building with two floors and four wards, containing the capacity to treat 20 inpatients and about two hundred outpatients in the lower floor dispensary each month. It had been created in 1869 by Christian Missionary Society member Dr. Meadows. Upon Main's arrival, he was appointed as the superintendent of Hangzhou's Church Missionary Medical Mission and thus took charge of the hospital.

During his first year in Central Hospital, he treated opium addiction, performed cataract removals, treated leprosy, and prescribed medicine.

As the opium epidemic continued in China, Main maintained the original goal of the first Central Hospital, and thus continued to allot time to treating opium addicts and included space for a male and female Opium Refuge.

==== The Hospital of Universal Benevolence (1884) ====
The Hospital of Universal Benevolence, also known as Kwang-Chi (or Guangji in Pinyin), was founded after increasing numbers of patients lined up at the dispensary each morning, and more in-patient space was needed. To fund this expansion operation, Main saw private patients, who paid him small fees for his service. Main reported that he had been "sent out here to glorify God by our lives work, and we must do it as far as possible under the healthiest conditions," thus implying the existing hospital conditions to be unfit.

Main obtained the necessary funds through letter requests to the Chinese provincial government and through money from the William Charles Jones Fund. He designed the hospital, and in May 1884, the Hospital of Universal Benevolence was opened. It contained two stories and a basement, four general wards, ten private wards, a dispensary, a waiting room, and chapel. The patients were initially primarily male, with few wards allotted to women. Preaching occurred in each ward; all patients had the Gospel presented to them and many patients were baptised. It was mandated that those who could afford to pay for their board did so, but medical attendance was free to all. In 1894, due to space constraints and Chinese customary preferences, a separate women's hospital was constructed.

Dr. and Mrs. Kember, a European doctor and his wife, oversaw all of the operations and provided help, especially during the Mains' holidays. By the end of 1885, 7,931 outpatients and 374 inpatients had been treated, as well as 180 private patients and 1460 country patients. 79 cases of suicide by opium were brought to the hospital and 60 were saved.

Female and male rest homes were added in 1922 for the workers associated with the various hospitals and institutions. A Pastor's Rest Home was also built for the native clergy and their wives.

===== 1909 renovations =====
Throughout the hospital's existence, the number of patients and facilities increased. As the private practice grew, more fees poured into the hospital, which helped fund the working expenses of the institution. The chapel was renovated and a large public hall (Lecture Hall) was added to the other buildings in the compound. Each morning before work began in the outpatient department, Main and his workers held morning service and gave an address; all patients were able to attend.

New buildings were built on newly purchased land, in which the patients were able to live in the open air. In 1905, the hospital opened dermatitis wards, female wards, and obstetrical wards. Six years later, the hospital was fully equipped with electrical lamps, water pipes, and X-ray machine equipment.

The hospital exchanged hands and names multiple times as the political situations in China varied, however in 1960 it was given its present name "Second Affiliated Hospital, Zhejiang Medical University." In the 1980s it set up the area's first Emergency Intensive Care unit. In 1999 the hospital was ranked in the top 100 hospitals in China. It is now in touch with numerous hospitals and universities, including UCLA, Johns Hopkins, and the Mayo Clinic.

==== The Men and Women's Leper Hospitals (1889, 1892) ====
Main wrote to the Mission to Lepers in Edinburgh, asking for funds to open a leprosy apartment because the number of lepers in China was very high. His requests were met, enabling him to purchase land containing two buildings beside the compound of medical buildings. These were converted into male and female quarters, with a kitchen and attendants. They were later relocated to include renovations.

==== The Home for Untainted Children (1906) ====
Dr. and Mrs. Main built a home for the children whose parents were residing in either the Men's or Women's Hospital. There was shelter, care, and Christian influence; many were baptised after being brought in. A school was opened later. A matron and a nurse tended to the children, many of whom went on to be of service to the main hospital.

==== Fresh Air House ====
Dr. Main established this home as a place of healthy living, in which patients were to "eat fresh air," along with fresh vegetables, fruits, and meat. Patients were weighed weekly, in order to document growth and progression. One patient remarked, "I feel all made new since I came up here."

== Schools ==
=== The Hangzhou Medical Training College (1885) ===
In 1882, Main began training a few young men, teaching them surgery and medicine. They received practical training in the dispensary as well as bedside lectures, then formed their own diagnoses, which were later compared with Main's diagnoses. He continued the expansion of his preaching and teaching quarters in order to accommodate more practitioners and students. His lectures covered health, feeding, sanitation, education, chemistry, and Gospel studies.

Main opened this school to train natives as well as Europeans. About one hundred students were trained at the college in conjunction with the Hospital of Universal Benevolence while he was in China. Initially, the teaching staff consisted of two professors, and because of this, new students could only enter every five years. The first three batches of students were Christians, however the demand for Western medical training had increased so much since the Boxer Rebellion that a few "heathen" (non-Christian) students were admitted. The college contained a lecture hall, a pathological laboratory, and a chemical laboratory. Many of the men trained by Main remained to work either directly or indirectly in the Mission, if not in the hospitals.

The college was renovated after the Young Men's Christian Association (YMCA) came together in Hangzhou in 1916, in which large meetings were held to teach about hygienic rules of life and conduct. This included the Gospel as salvation for the soul and body. The meeting was met with success, and Yuan Shikai sent 2,000 dollars to fund the work. 10,000 dollars were donated by Lord and Lady Maclay in memory of their son. At the stone laying event, a casket was buried beneath the foundation containing a Bible, reports of the five years work of the YMCA, rules of the YMCA, badges, lists of subscribers and their subscriptions, a map of Hangzhou, a photograph of the building plan, calendars, and copies of the paper inviting people to the stone laying event.

The hospital was opened in 1924. The ground and first floors were devoted to teaching, and the second to a hostel for students. There were also six laboratories for physics, organic and physiological chemistry, general chemistry, elementary biology, histology, and pharmacology. The building also contained a library and was equipped with new apparatus, including two X-Ray machines, a UV light lamp, two high frequency systems for violet ray treatment, a pantostat, a carbonic acid snow generator, massage apparatus, a localizer for foreign objects in the body, fluoroscopic screens, and minor devices for galvanism, faradism, and ionization.

Main was elected Principal Emeritus of the college prior to his departure and continued to stimulate interest in the work during his retirement in Edinburgh.

=== Midwifery Training School (1906) ===
Dr. and Mrs. Main were approached by some members of Hangzhou's gentry about the need for a school for women. Kao Tai Tai, a prominent woman in Hangzhou known for her work among the poor, as well as Dr. Liu Ming-Ts consulted Main about opening a midwife training home. They responded by opening a midwifery school in July 1906 to train women in delivering babies. It contained a lecture hall, class room, students' rooms, wards for training, and wards for post-delivery. Lectures were given by Main and Liu, on anatomy, physiology, and midwifery. The worship Mission was central to this and thus many people trained there became baptized, including the matron herself. (5) During the first year of operation, 90 women applied and 22 were admitted. In its first two years of operations, 68 patients were received and 38 baby girls and 31 baby boys were born.

== Turmoil in China affecting Main's work ==
=== The Boxer Rebellion (1900) ===
During the beginning of the anti-Western Boxer Rebellion, 80 Christian missionaries were killed, and many Chinese Christians preferred death to joining the rebellion and opposing the Christians. Many missionaries relocated to Shanghai during the period of unrest, including Mrs. Main. In 1900, the Empress ordered the four provincial officers of Hanghow to kill all Hangzhou missionaries, however three of the four refused this order. Of the three refusers, all were friends of Main's. Main had been on furlough in Europe during this time, however many lives were spared due to the friendly connections he had made with Chinese officials, and thus he was met with a parade upon his return to China.

Main found many of China's problems to be rooted in conservatism, misconception of western civilization, and Soviet Russia. Main stated in a letter of correspondence "The Chinese are too conservative, and have too high an opinion of their own country."

The progression of health care in China was greatly hindered by the disruption caused by the civil unrest that ensued in 1911. Many trained workers were taken away en masse, and replaced by less experienced, albeit eager helpers. Native helpers had trouble controlling patients of higher social positions, despite having more general knowledge of nursing, cleanliness, and health. An influx of inpatients occurred and the college was turned into a temporary emergency hospital. Some of the revolutionary soldiers guarding the hospital attended prayers in the hospital chapel.

=== World War I and Civil War (1914) ===
In Hangzhou, many workers left to join the forces of the war in France. In the spring of 1916, Hangzhou declared independence.

Civil war created turmoil across China, continuing on into the 1920s. The first Red Cross unit of Hangzhou was organized by the staff at the main hospital and consisted of 23 members.

In May 1924, a riot centered around anti-foreigner sentiments and patriotism occurred in Shanghai, in which some Chinese students were killed. This news spread to Hangzhou, and inspired the Students to organize anti-foreign and anti-British demonstrations. Outside efforts were made to draw the medical students out of Hangzhou, promised with support or wages, acceptance at other schools, or diplomas from other schools for those ready to graduate. Main attempted to dissuade this movement, however many Hangzhou students were filled with aiguo (Chinese nationalism) fervor and left. The college closed for the term and this anti-British boycott affected all work in Hangzhou in 1925. Main's life was threatened during this period of unrest. The college reopened later that year.

Towards their departure in 1926, Communist influence was beginning to be felt in Hangzhou. Civil war ensued in 1927.

== Political influence ==
In conjunction with the Zejiang government officials, Main built the Lecture Hall, where famous people were invited to give talks about local affairs, education, finance, road building, mining, better living, and abolition of superstition.

=== The Shanghai Conference ===
Main and his wife were invited to attend the Shanghai conference, where delegates from all over China and from all denominations of God met to confer on general missionary problems. Plans were made for the future of good missionary work in general.

Main was also invited to attend the Joint Conference of the National Medical Association of China and the China Medical Missionary Society in January 1917.

=== Anti Opium Movement ===
Main's work contributed to the Anti-Opium Movement, which was formed from missionaries of all denominations. In July 1907, the City Authorities of Hangzhou ordered all opium dens to close. Thus, a large influx of patients came into the opium refuge wards, and Main and his staff recognized that a reform was finally setting in. They opened an additional temporary refuge to meet the need. At the end of autumn in this year, there was a civic function held on Hangzhou's peak, in which all opium pipes and paraphernalia were burned. Mandarins, soldiers, students, and thousands of people attended the event and cheered when they were set on fire.

Speeches were given by officials and some of the native clergy and medical staff were called upon to discuss the negatives of opium smoking and the successful efforts made at the Opium Refuge. The opium users who had previously evaded contact with the doctors began crowding around them begging to be cured and educated, so that they could educate others. The anti-opium movement continued after this, as many were still affected by opium.

=== China Medical Board ===
Main completed about 450 letters, a total of 570 pages, to the China Medical Board from 1915 until he left in 1926. Many of them ask for funds for medical and hospital developments, however many of his letters read like a diary, recounting stories of his life. He discussed other topics as well, such as the local political circumstances, Chinese medical operations, Chinese medical culture, social turmoil, opium usage, and the China Continuation Committee.

=== The Hangzhou Government School ===
After the successful treatment of 25 students in 1923, anti-Christian sentiments against the H.G. School were reduced.

=== Foreign influence ===
Main and his wife vacationed in Japan during 1923, when the Great Kanto earthquake struck. They survived and returned to Hangzhou to rest following this traumatic event and then began working to rebuild buildings affected by the earthquake.

The Mains also visited Hong Kong and Japan in 1925, where their own Medical Missionary Association met with the British Medical Association for six days and formed unified relations and discussed high-order papers.

== Translation of works ==
Main translated several medical books to Mandarin, including Wounds, Abscesses, and Ulcers, Midwifery, Surgical Handbook, Whitla's Dictionary of Treatment, and Caird and Cathart's Surgical Handbook.

== Awards ==
- Membership of the Royal College of Physicians of Edinburgh (1901)
- Membership of the Royal College of Surgeons of Edinburgh
- Mandarin of the Fifth Class (1895)
- The Second, Third, and Fourth Decoration of the Excellent Crop (Late 1890s)
- Second Order with Great Sash (1925) The Chinese Red Cross Medal (1911)
- Honorary Member of the National Medical Conference (held in Shanghai)
- Pavilion and Tablet: To Commemorate the Fifty Years' Service of Dr. and Mrs. Duncan Main in Hangzhou (located in Hangzhou)

== Children ==
- Duncan Main Jr.: Duncan received training in Edinburgh, and then returned to China to assist his father as assistant superintendent. He settled in Shanghai with his family. He had a son, Duncan, and a daughter, Griselda. He became chemistry lecturer in the college.
- Ronald Main
- Gordon Main
- Fergus Main

== Later life (1926–1934) ==
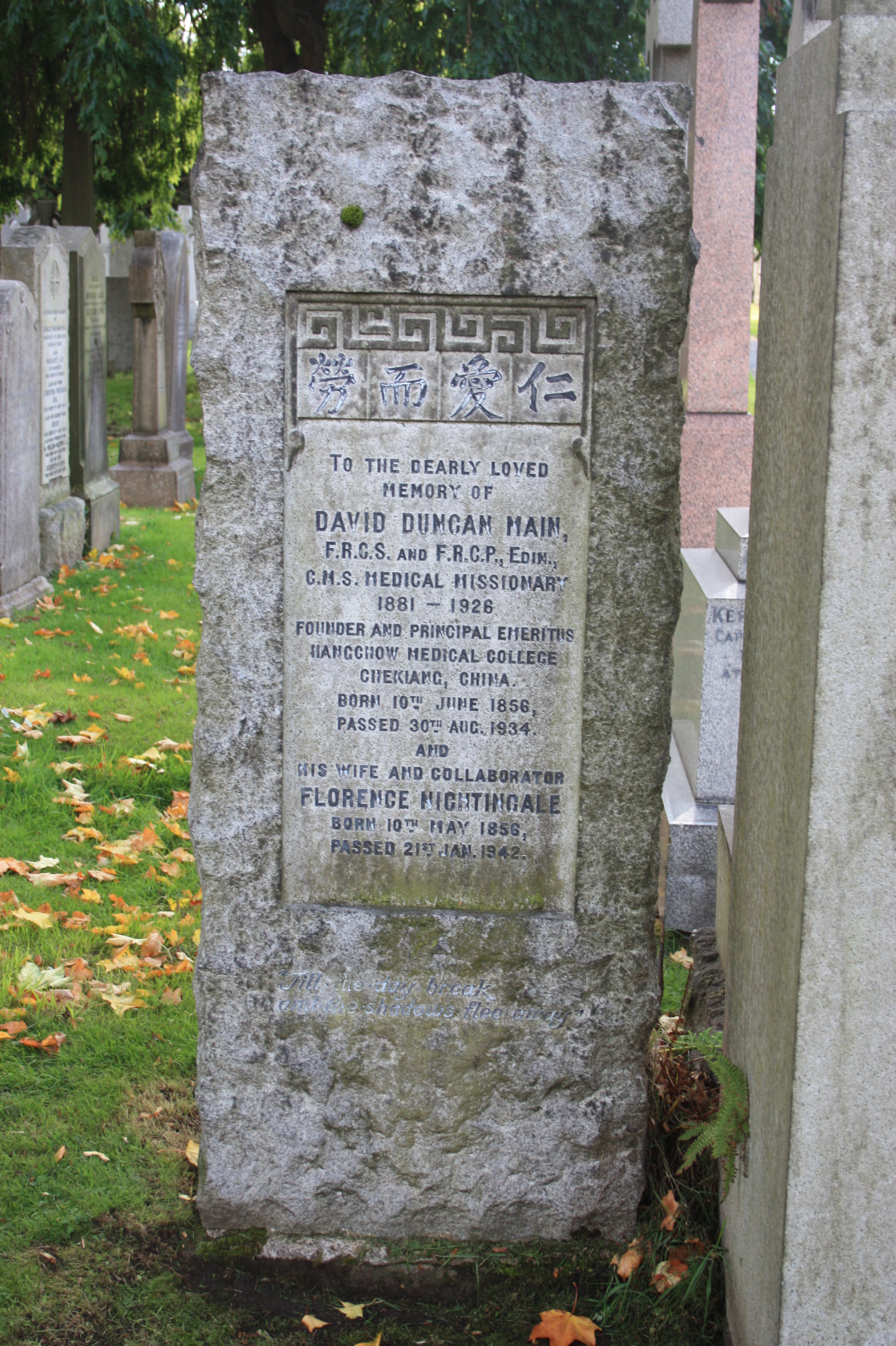
The grave of David Duncan Main, Dean Cemetery, Edinburgh

Main and his wife returned to Edinburgh on December 7, 1926, where he finally retired, 10 years past the set retirement age for Church Missionary Society. Before leaving, he expressed many worries, because he didn't wish to leave behind Hangzhou, when it still needed a larger Medical school, more doctor housing, an infection hospital for outbreaks and prevention of outbreaks, and much more. In the beginning of 1926, the doctor and his wife prepared delegation of roles in order to ensure proper organization after their permanent departure. His eldest son, Duncan, and Dr. Carrington prepared and trained prior to his leaving.

Before Dr. and Mrs. Main's departure, crowds attended a prayer meeting commending them for their return voyage. The day that they left, a huge procession of students, patients, doctors, gentry, officials, friends, and admirers followed them to the train station as a showing of gratitude. The Consuls, many missionaries, and European friends arrived at the boat-house to wish them farewell.

Main took interest in the medical life of Edinburgh, after settling down in 1927.

== Death ==
Main died on August 30, 1934. He is buried with his wife, Florence Nightingale (1856-1942), in Dean Cemetery in western Edinburgh. The grave lies in the north-east section of the original northern extension.

== Legacy ==
In 2017, a small museum devoted to Main was opened on the property of naked Castle, a resort built on the site of Main's former summer residence, Villa #1, in Moganshan, China. The museum is a celebration of his life's work, especially the medical work he carried out in the local area. There are many old photos and writings on display from the era.
