= Congo-Balolo Mission =

British Baptist missionary society

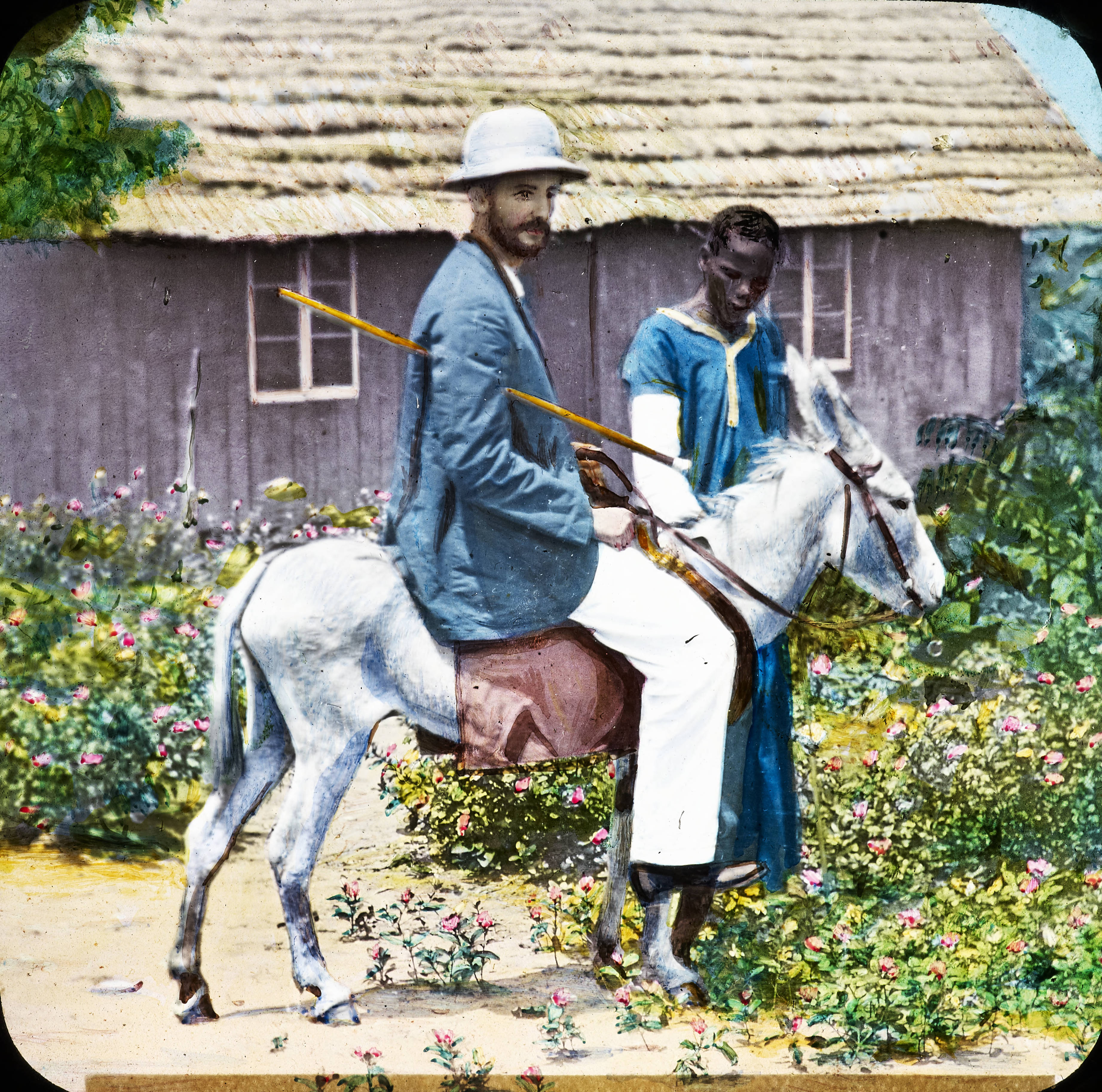
- Congo-Balolo Missionary on donkey, with Congolese man (c. 1910).
- Successor: Regions Beyond Missionary Union
- Formation: 1888
- Dissolved: 1915
- Type: Mission Society
- Location: Belgian Congo

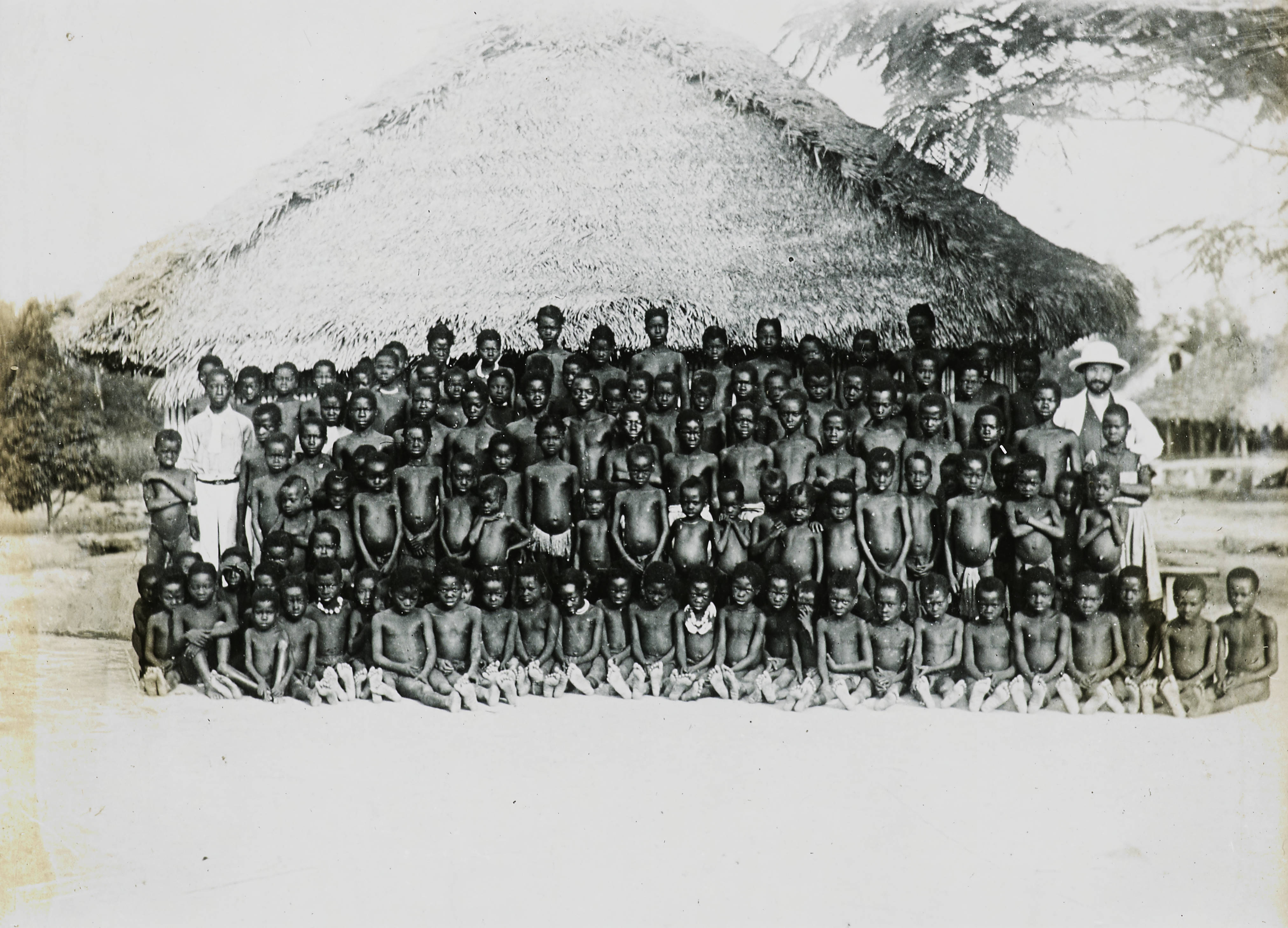
Congo Balolo Mission missionary and village boys (c. 1910).

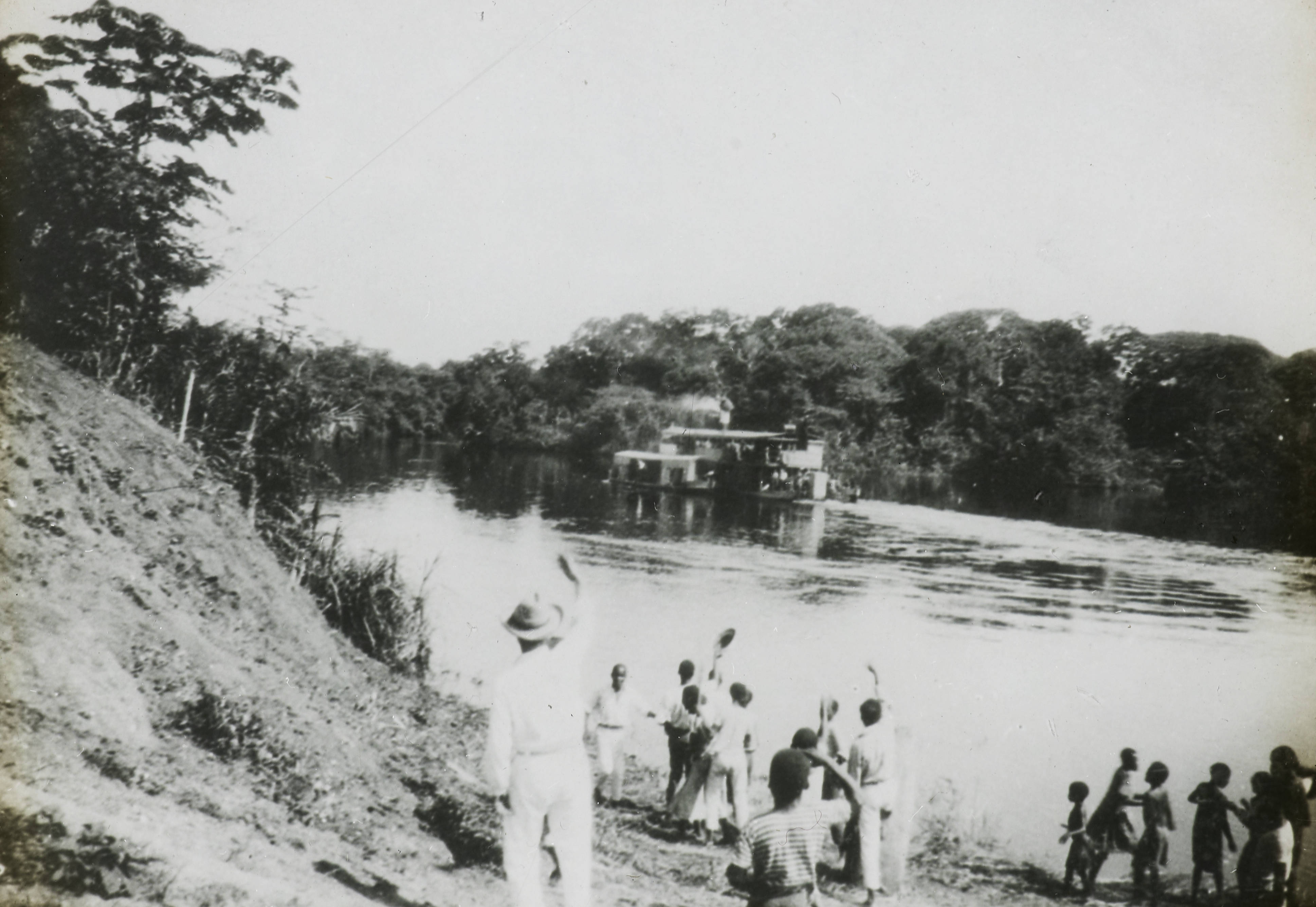
Congo-Balolo Mission's landing on the Congo River (c. 1910).

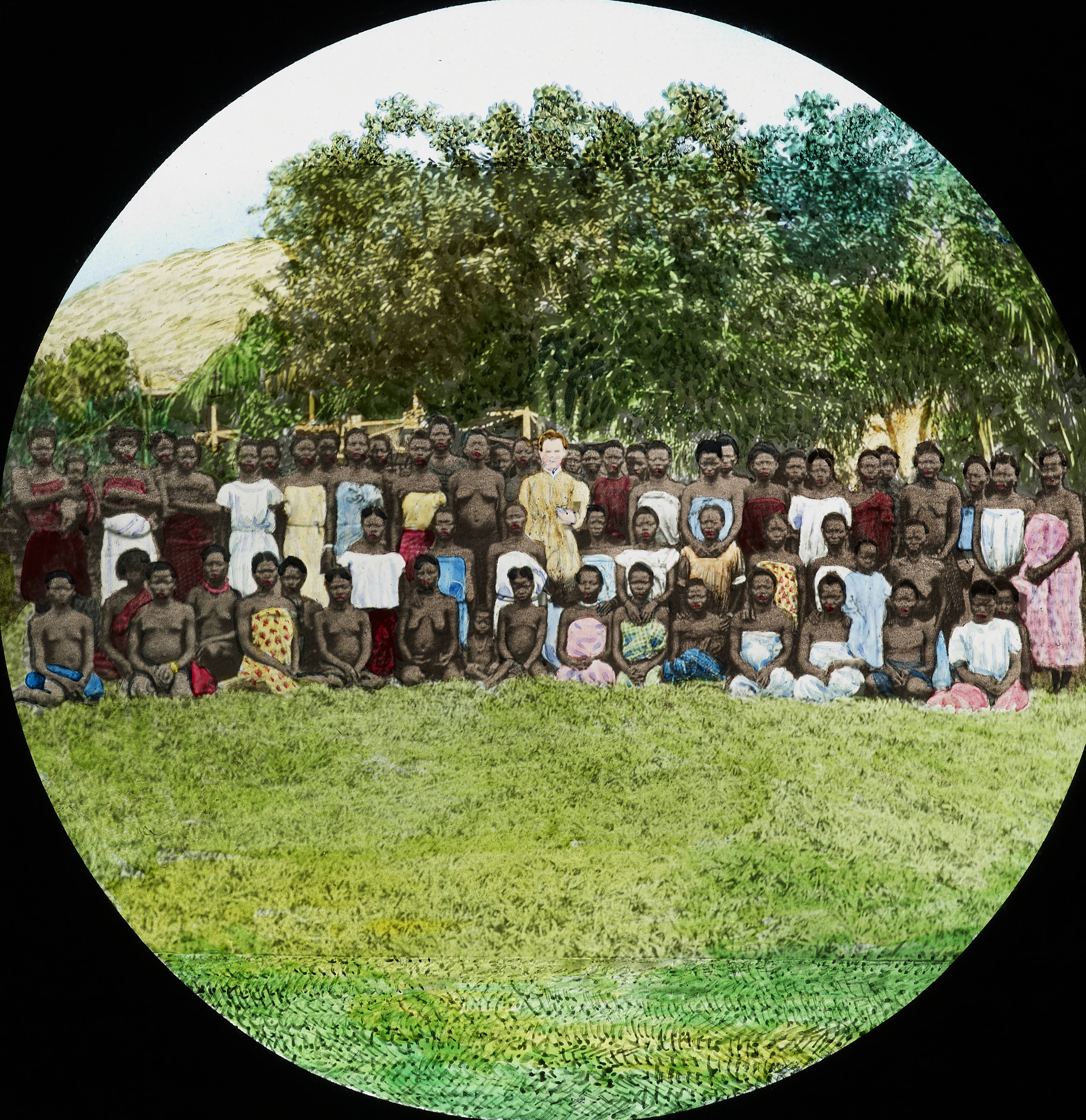
Congolese women and female missionary (c. 1910).

The Congo-Balolo Mission (CBM) was a British Baptist missionary society that was active in the Belgian Congo, the present day Democratic Republic of the Congo, from 1889 to 1915. It was the predecessor of the Regions Beyond Missionary Union (RBMU), established in 1900, which today is called World Team.

== Formation ==
The leading figure in establishing the mission was Henry ("Harry") Grattan Guinness II, born in Toronto on 2 October 1861, son of the charismatic preacher Henry Grattan Guinness. Harry Guinness studied at the London Hospital from 1880 to 1885, then spent two years as a minister in Australia and Tasmania. In June 1887 Harry Guinness became leader of the East London Training Institute for Home and Foreign Missions, which his parents had established.

In 1888 there was a World Missionary Convention at Exeter Hall in London. Harry was able to talk with Dr. Murdock, the leader of the American Baptist Missionary Union (ABMU), who had taken responsibility to the Livingstone Inland Mission (LIM) four years earlier. Harry had become enthusiastic about the plans of John McKittrick, a former LIM missionary now working for the ABMU, who wanted to extent the field of missionary activity further upstream into the tributaries of the Congo south and west of the great bend of that river. Dr. Murdoch supported the plan, agreeing to release McKittrick and also to loan the former LIM steamer Henry Reed for a year. The new mission was called the Congo Balolo Mission, with plans to operate on six southern tributaries of the Congo: the Lulonga, Maringa, Lopori, Ikelemba, Juapa and Bosira. During the years that followed many of the missionaries died, to be replaced by fresh volunteers. Only six of the first thirty five CBM missionaries were alive by 1900.

== Early Congo activities ==
The first party of volunteers left England in April 1889 and reached Matadi in August 1889, from where they trekked upstream to Stanley Pool. The society was given enough money to buy a side-paddle steamer named the Pioneer, which was shipped to the Congo, arriving in December 1889. The boat was then carried in sections to Stanley Pool where it was rebuilt and launched. By March 1891, first using the Henry Reed and then the Pioneer, the CBM missionaries had established stations.at Bonginda, Lulonga, Ikau and Bongandanga. During the years that followed many of the missionaries died of accidents or diseases such as malaria and sleeping sickness, to be replaced by fresh volunteers. Only six of the first thirty five CBM missionaries were alive by 1900.

According to Fanny Guinness, "The basis of the Congo Balolo Nission is interdenominational, simply Christian and thoroughly evangelical. Members of any of the evangelical churches are welcomed as workers in it". However, the mission found some of the neighboring missions easier to work with than others. The CBM signed a comity agreement with the Mission Evangelique de l'Ubangi, but had difficulty reaching an agreement with the Disciples of Christ Congo Mission (DCCM), which had a rather different philosophy. An internal letter complained of the DCCM that "They have come into CBM villages, in some cases placing teachers and in other cases baptizing large numbers of natives without any reference to us".

The missionaries arrived at a time of great stress. The Abir Congo Company of King Leopold II of Belgium was using brutal techniques to coerce the local population into producing rubber, the slave trade continued, and new epidemic diseases were causing considerable loss of life. This disruption and apparent failure of the old systems may have made the people more receptive to the new message brought by the missionaries. The missionaries taught local people to spread the word, and these evangelists communicated their understanding of the Bible in their own words.

Many of the missionaries were from working-class backgrounds, and took pride in teaching their African students practical skills such as printing or carpentry. With these skills the CBM graduates were much in demand by the government. They were also at risk, in the eyes of the missionaries, from corruption by the loose standards of the larger towns where they went to work. The missionaries generally had a rigid view of right and wrong, condemning practices such as polygamy, immodest dress and lascivious dancing. On the other hand, they sometimes mocked Africans who attempted to imitate European ways too closely. Despite these handicaps, the missionaries succeeded in communicating the essence of their faith, which the local people adopted, adapted and assimilated.

== Expansion into RBMU ==
In 1899 the CBM sent its first missionaries to India, and in 1900 changed its name to the Regions Beyond Missionary Union (RBMU). The RBMU was to expand into many other parts of the world. By 1916 the RBMU had forty-one missionaries in the Congo, in nine stations scattered over an area the size of England. In 1932 the RBMU founded the Baringa Hospital, and in 1945 opened a second hospital at Yoseki. By 1955 there were 32,000 church members, and 9,000 children in the mission's schools in the Congo.
