= Baptist Community of Congo =

Baptist Christian denomination in the DRC

- Communauté Baptiste du Congo
- Abbreviation: CBCO
- Classification: Protestant
- Orientation: Baptist
- Theology: Evangelical Baptist
- Associations: Church of Christ in the Congo; Baptist World Alliance; WCC
- Headquarters: Kinshasa, Democratic Republic of the Congo
- Origin: 1946
- Congregations: 966
- Members: 1,050,000
- Hospitals: 9
- Primary schools: 608
- Secondary schools: 453

The Baptist Community of Congo (French: Communauté Baptiste du Congo, CBCO) is a Baptist Christian denomination in Democratic Republic of the Congo. It is affiliated with the Church of Christ in the Congo, and the Baptist World Alliance. The headquarters is in Kinshasa.

== History ==
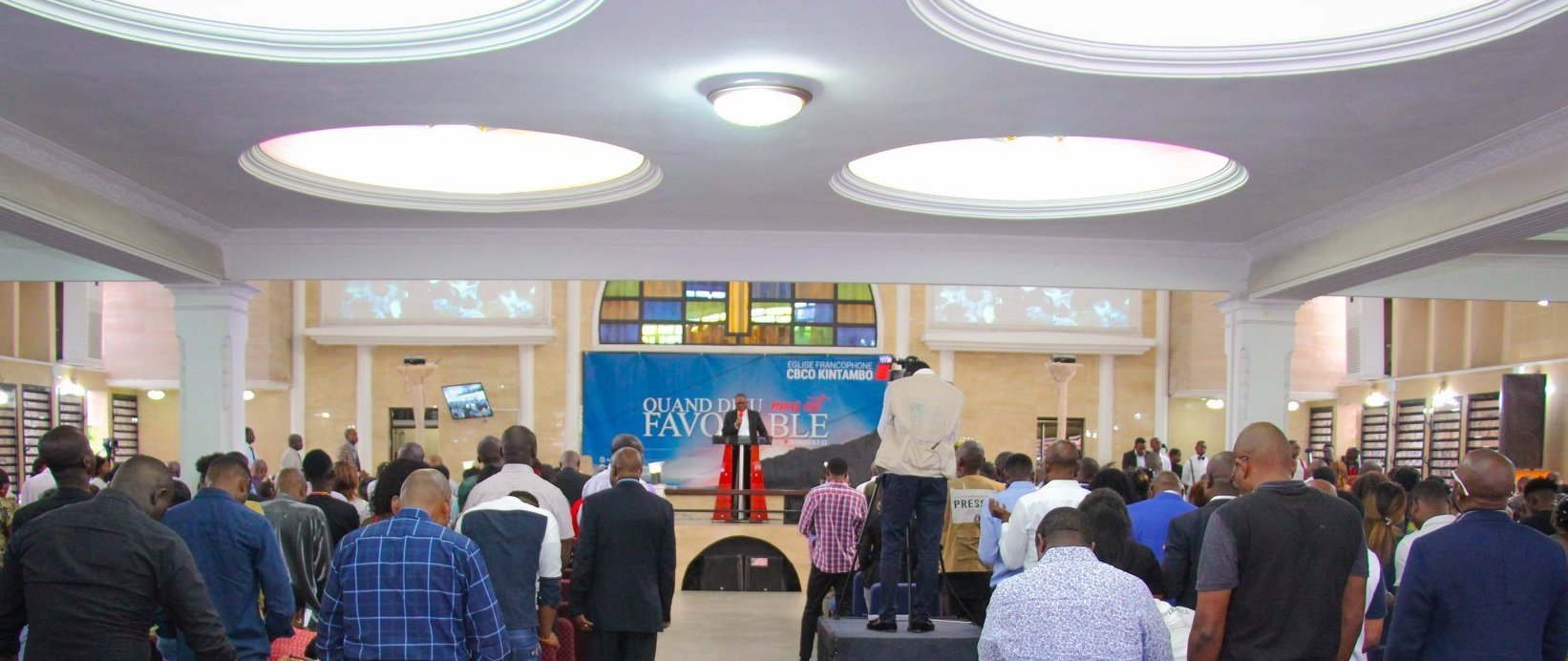
Worship service at CBCO Church Kintambo in Kinshasa, affiliated to the Baptist Community of Congo, 2019.

The Baptist Community of Congo has its origins in a British mission of the Livingstone Inland Mission installed in the Upper Congo River, in 1878, by the Baptist Welsh pastor Alfred Tilly. In 1884, the Livingstone Inland Mission was taken over by the American Baptist Missionary Union. In 1946, the Baptist Church of Congo is founded.

In 2004, the organization takes the name of Baptist Community of Congo. In 2006, the Community had 600 churches and 252,000 members. According to a census published by the association in 2023, it claimed 966 churches and 1,050,000 members.

== Schools ==
The Community has 608 primary schools, 453 secondary schools.

== Health Services ==
The Community has 9 hospitals, 96 health centers.

== See also ==
- Bible
- Born again
- Baptist beliefs
- Jesus Christ
- Believers' Church
