= Arthur Jephson =

British explorer (1859–1908)

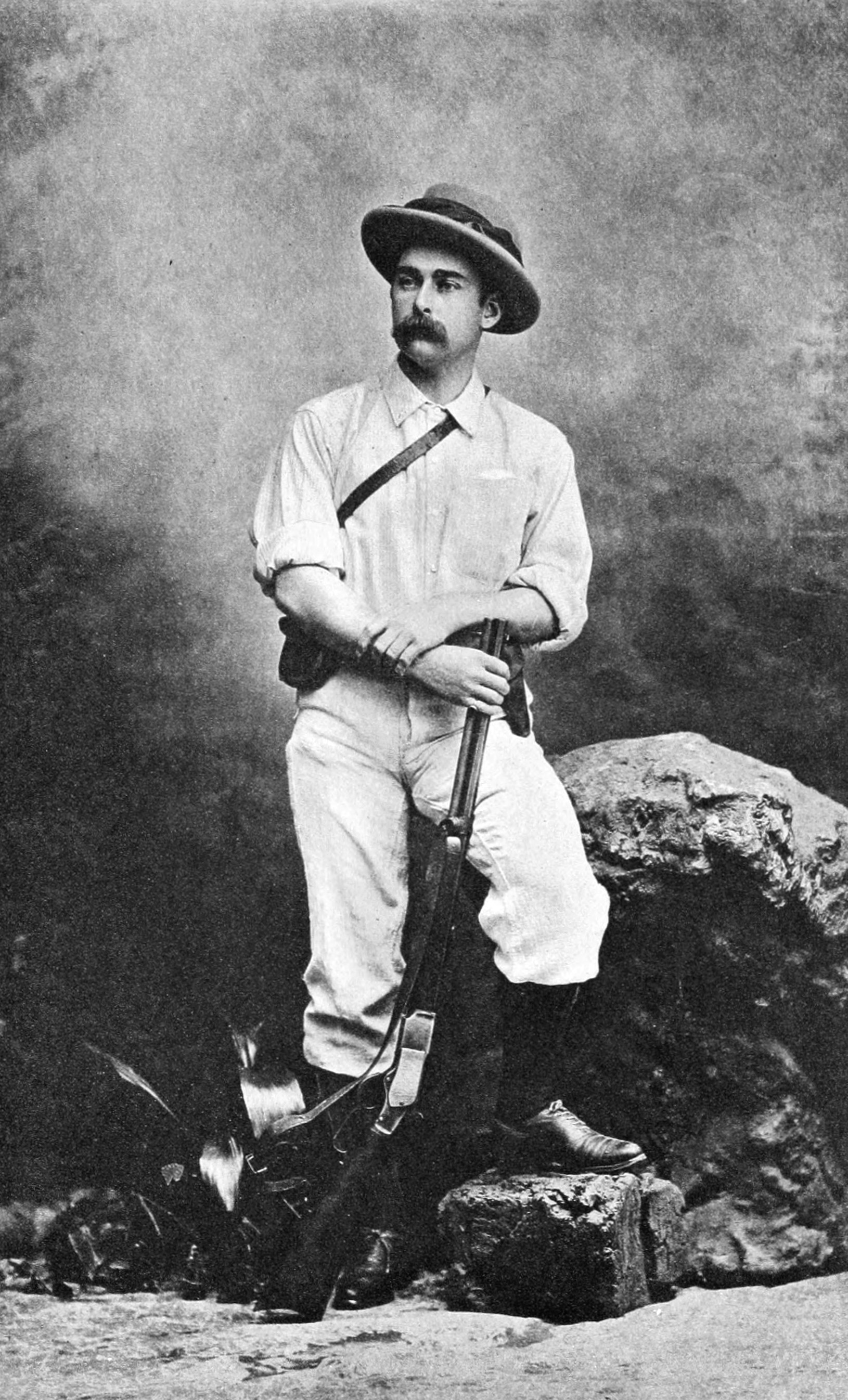

Arthur Jermy Mounteney Jephson (1859–1908) was an English merchant seaman and army officer. He became an adventurer and African explorer, who accompanied H. M. Stanley on the Emin Pasha Relief Expedition, 1887–1889.

== Emin Pasha Relief Expedition ==
Jephson's diary from the expedition was published half a century after his death, and provides a record of the late Victorian African expeditions, of which this expedition was to be the last.

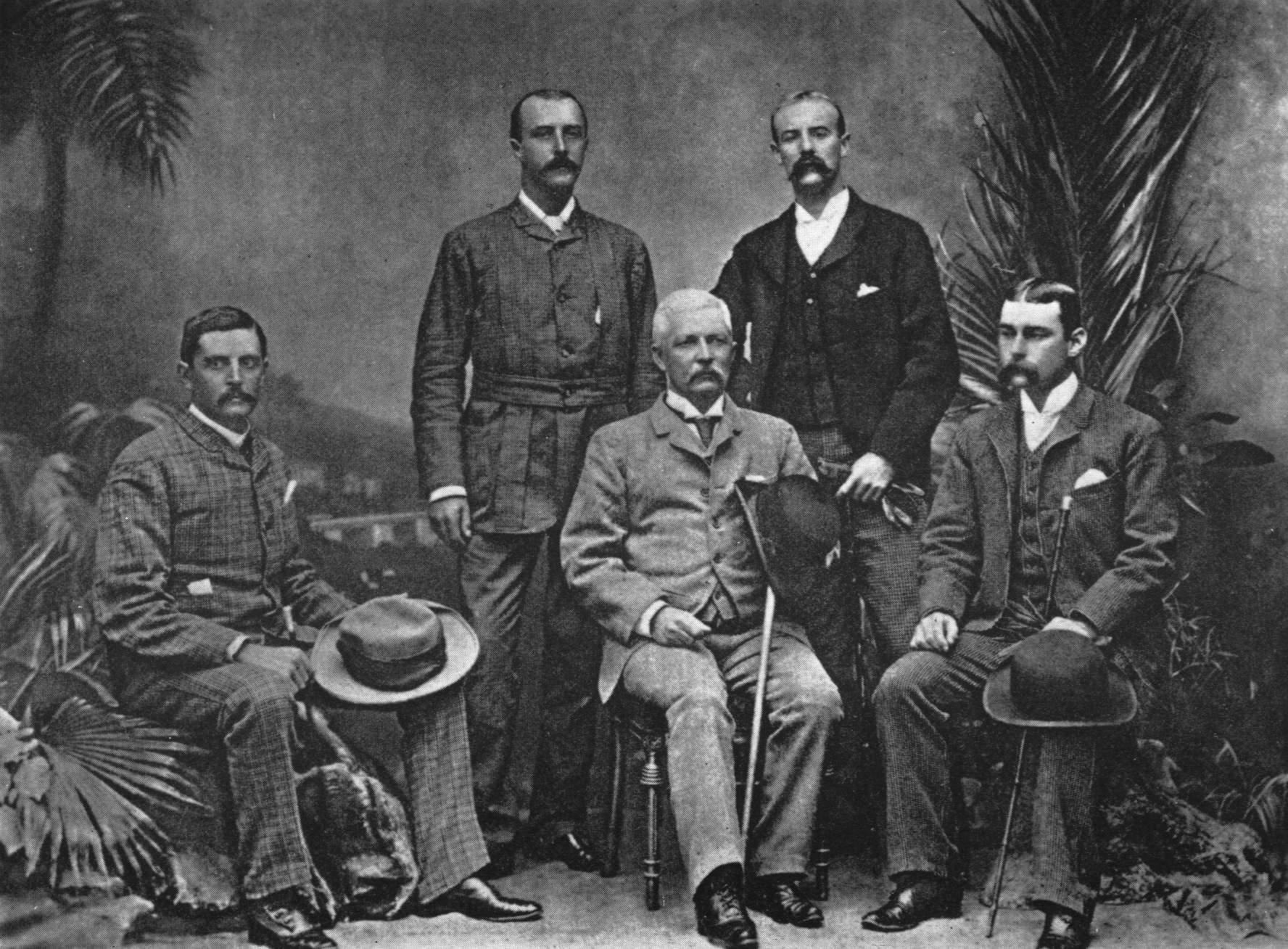
Henry M Stanley with the officers of the Advance Column, Cairo, 1890. From the left : Dr. Thomas Heazle Parke, Robert H. Nelson, Henry M. Stanley, William G. Stairs, and Arthur J. M. Jephson

== References and further reading ==
=== Primary sources ===
- Jephson, A. J. Mounteney : Diary, Edited by Dorothy Middleton, Hakluyt Society, 1969
- Stanley, Henry Morton : In Darkest Africa, 1890

=== Secondary works ===
- Liebowitz, Daniel; Pearson, Charles : The Last Expedition: Stanley's Mad Journey Through the Congo, 2005, ISBN 0-393-05903-0
- Moorehead, Alan : The White Nile, London, 1960, 1971
- Smith, Iain R. : The Emin Pasha Relief Expedition 1886-1890, Oxford University Press, 1972
- Gould, Tony : In Limbo: The Story of Stanley's Rear Column, David & Charles 1980 ISBN 0-241-10125-5

Note: The name is also spelled "Mountenay"
