= Geraldine Hooper =

British preacher and hymn writer

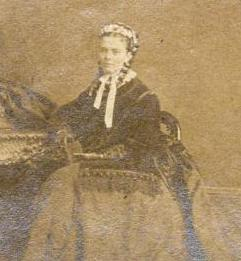
- Born: 30 March 1841; Paris
- Died: 12 August 1872 (aged 31); Bath, Somerset
- Other names: Mrs Henry Dening, Geraldine Dening
- Occupation: Preacher
- Spouse: Henry Dening
- Children: one

Emma Geraldine Henrietta Hamilton Hooper became Geraldine Dening (30 March 1841 – 12 August 1872) was a British preacher and hymn writer. She was well known in the 1860s and died aged 31.

== Life ==
Hooper was born in Paris in 1841 and baptised in Somerset. She was brought up in Bath where she showed early interest in singing and dancing, but she gave all this up after hearing sermons by J. M. Dixon, the rector of Trinity Church in Bath. After this she took to concentrating on giving bible classes in 1861 in Bath in association with the clergyman William Haslam. The following year she was preaching herself at her classes when a preacher was not available and soon she was doing this unconditionally.

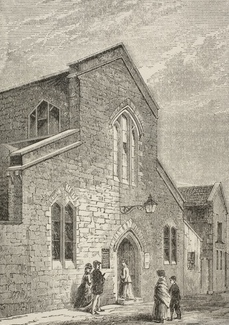
St James Hall in Bath in the 1880s where Geraldine and her husband had a mission

From 1863 and until 1871 Haslam was the rector of Buckenham and Hassingham in Norfolk. Haslam's wife invited Hooper to lead a mission in Buckenham. She would assist Haslam and suggest themes for sermons and she ran a temperance meeting each Sunday evening. She was popular and she began to tour becoming one of the most well known female preachers in her time. Her approach was very similar to Jessie Macfarlane who was also a popular woman preacher and she met her.

In 1869 she married another preacher and they settled initially in Ottery St Mary where her husband had a farm but they moved to Bath with their daughter. They would take turns to lead services at the mission hall they had built which is still named St James Hall. They were both still members of the Church of England. Her husband (Thomas) Henry Frickey Dening was able to fund their work from his own resources. She wrote and published several hymns. Her sermons were said to be emotional with audience members weeping. Women preaching was more acceptable because some considered the practice to be a sign of the end of the world. She was not a feminist, but a "perfect lady" who was "irresistibly moving". Her example is thought to have encouraged other women to be more ambitious.

Hooper died young in Bath aged 31 from complications as a result of the skin infection Erysipelas. In 1872, the writer Fanny Emma Guinness published She Spake of Him: Being Recollections of the Loving Labours and Early Death of the Late Mrs. Henry Dening.
