= Regions Beyond Missionary Union =

The Regions Beyond Missionary Union was a Protestant Christian missionary society founded by Henry Grattan Guinness, D.D. and his wife Fanny in 1873.

The name is a reference to the goal declared by Paul the Apostle in his Second Epistle to the Corinthians, "To preach the gospel in the regions beyond you". (2 Cor 10:16) The society issued a journal named "Regions Beyond".

RBMU Peru merged with EUSA (Evangelical Union of South America) to form Latin Link in 1991. The Britain & Ireland and International offices of Latin Link are both based separately in Reading.

The rest of RMBU merged with World Team, formerly the West Indies Mission founded by Elmer Thompson and B.G. Lavastida in 1928, to form World Team Global in 1995.
