= Robert Henry Nelson =

Robert H. Nelson
- Born: 1853
- Died: 1892 (aged 38–39)
- Military career
- Allegiance: United Kingdom
- Branch: British Army
- Commands: Emin Pasha Relief Expedition
- Other work: Explorer

Robert Henry Nelson (1853–1892) was an Officer of the British Army and a young adventurer and African explorer, who accompanied H.M.Stanley on the Emin Pasha Relief Expedition, 1887–1889.

== Emin Pasha Relief Expedition ==
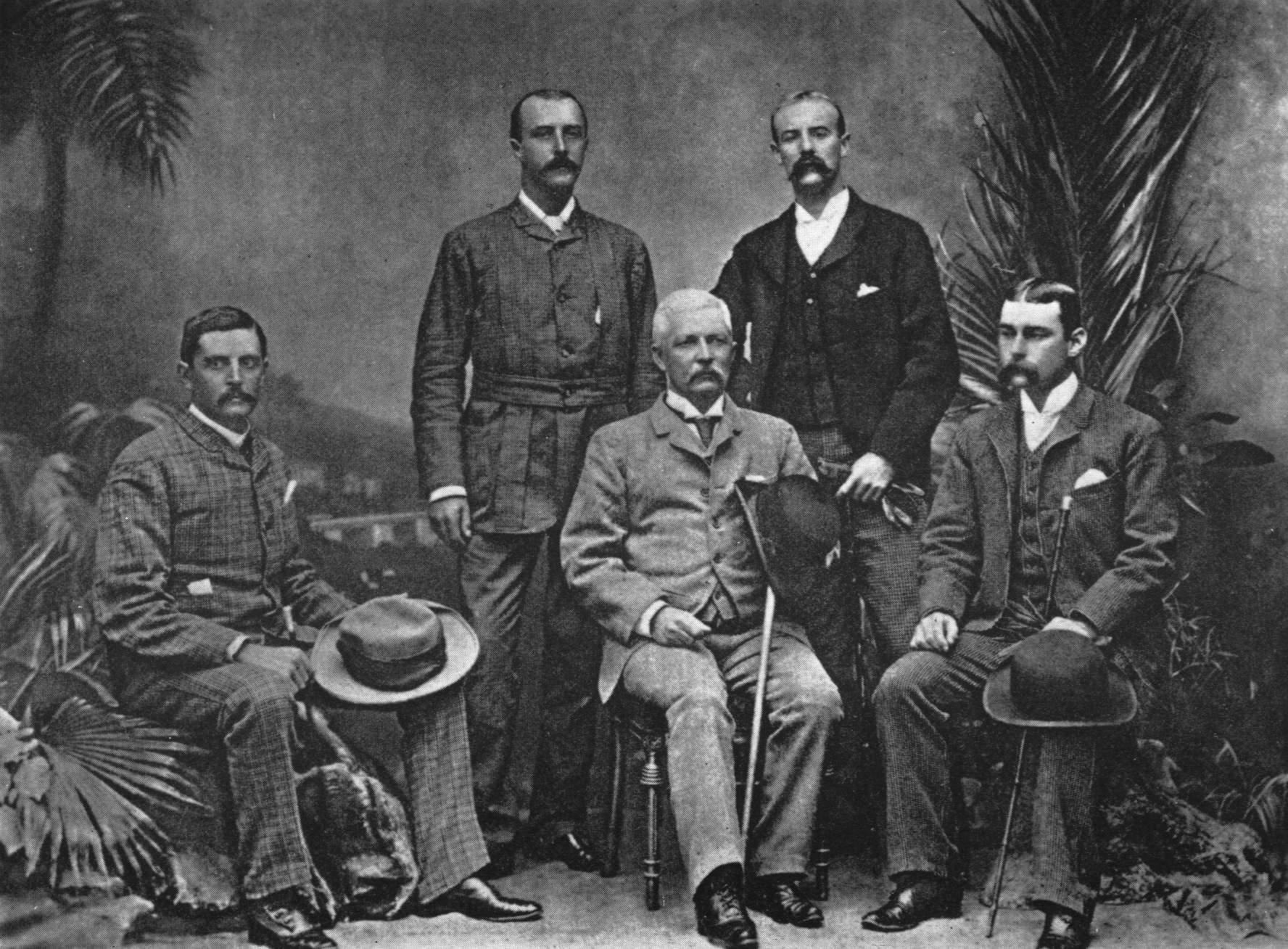
Henry M Stanley with the officers of the Advance Column, Cairo, 1890. From the left : Dr. Thomas Heazle Parke, Robert H. Nelson, Henry M. Stanley, William G. Stairs, and Arthur J. M. Jephson

Captain Robert Henry Nelson was one of the officers of the Emin Pasha Relief Expedition. Robert was the son of Henry Nelson a solicitor from Leeds, Yorkshire and Charlotte née Bywater. He was born in 1853 and was educated at Harrow, and afterwards at Weimer and in Paris. In 1878 he left England with the intention of going into ostrich farming in South Africa. At the outbreak of the Zulu War he joined the Mounted Volunteer Corps (Bakers Horse) as lieutenant. He served with Wood's flying column throughout the campaign, and received the South African medal and clasp in 1879.

In 1880 the Basuto rebellion broke out and Nelson was made captain and adjutant of a Mounted Native Corps stationed at Masseru. In 1884 he applied for and obtained a commission in the force of Mounted Riflemen raised at the Cape for service in Bechuanaland.

During the Emin Pasha expedition Captain Nelson became ill and was left behind. He was lamed with ulcers and left in a camp by the Aruwimi river with 52 sick men from the expedition in October 1887. When the explorers finally returned to the camp there were only five men left. The camp became known as "Starvation Fort". Nelson recovered and took part in the expedition and returned to England in February 1890.

In 1892 Nelson left England to enter the service of the Imperial British East Africa Company and was in charge of the district of Kikuyu, East Africa. He died of dysentery on 26 December 1892.
