= Gershom Whitfield Guinness =

Gershom Whitfield Guinness (April 25, 1869 – April 12, 1927) was a Protestant missionary in China, where he also was a practising medical doctor and a writer.

== Biography ==
Guiness was born in Paris to Henry Grattan Guinness, an Irish Protestant missionary and descendant of Guinness brewing family, and Fanny Grattan Guinness, née Fitzgerald. He was educated at the High School, Launceston, Tasmania; and Leys School, Cambridge. B.A. 1891. Enrolling into Caius college in 1888 to study medicine, he received his M.B. and B.C. there in 1896.

As most of his other siblings, he became a missionary and fulfilled one of his father's dreams by joining, as his sister Geraldine had done earlier, China Inland Mission, coming to Kaifeng, Henan, in 1900 and immediately barely escaped being slaughtered in anti-foreign Boxer Rebellion. He is mostly remembered for the letters he wrote to his father while escaping the rebels, and the book he wrote later recollecting his experience, "A Great Deliverance." He died in Peking; his biography by his sister Geraldine was published in 1930.

Guinness’s grandson Os Guinness was an author and Christian apologist.
