= Henry Grattan Guinness =

Irish Protestant Christian preacher, evangelist and author

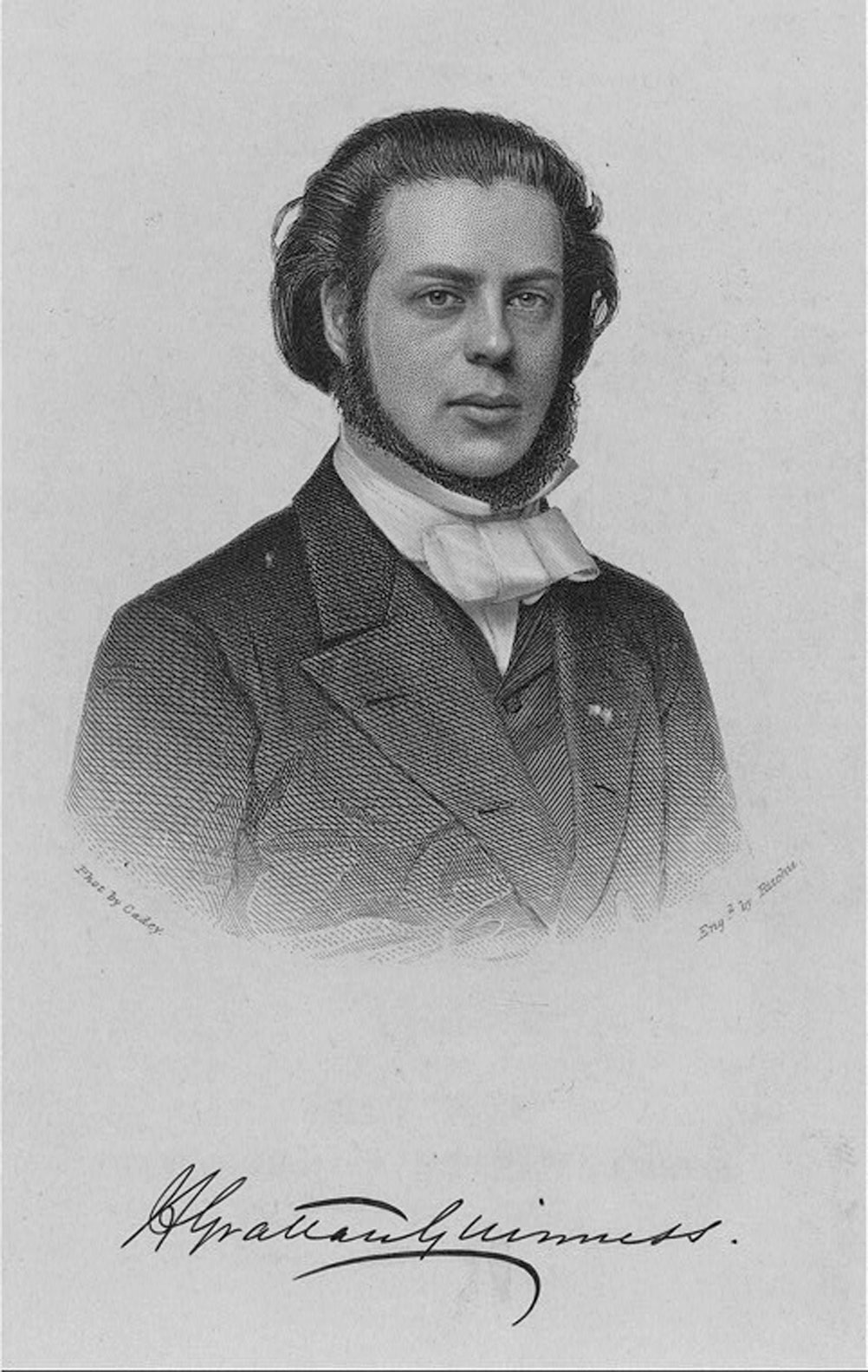
- Born: 11 August 1835; Kingstown in Taney, Dublin, Ireland
- Died: 21 June 1910 (aged 74); Bath, Somerset, England
- Occupations: Nonconformist preacher, evangelist, and author
- Spouses: Fanny Emma Fitzgerald (m. 1860–1898); Grace Alexandra R Hurditch (m. 1903)

Henry Grattan Guinness (11 August 1835 – 21 June 1910) was an Irish Nonconformist Protestant preacher, evangelist and author. He was the great evangelist of the Third Evangelical awakening and preached during the Ulster Revival of 1859 which drew thousands to hear him. He was responsible for training and sending hundreds of "faith missionaries" all over the world.

== Earlier life ==
Guinness was born in Montpelier House, Kingstown in Taney, Dublin, Ireland. He was homeschooled by his parents and later at Cheltenham and Exeter under Rev. Dr. Mills and Rev. C. Worthy. He was the grandson of Arthur Guinness and Olivia Whitmore. His father was John Grattan Guinness (1783–1850), Arthur's youngest son, who was an officer in the Madras Army of the East India Company. His mother was Jane Lucretia D'Esterre, whose first husband Captain John Norcot D'Esterre had been killed in a duel in 1815 by Daniel O'Connell, who remorsefully paid her an annuity.

In 1853 at 17 years old, and somewhat backslidden in his faith, Guinness went to sea. During that year he visited the West Indies, Mexico, Texas, and Caribbean Sea area. He returned to England in 1853. In 1854 he was "sick unto death" when starting for the East Indies. So returning home, he repented and resolved to serve the Master.

In January 1856 Guinness entered New College in London under a tutor named Dr. Harris. Possessed of extraordinary talent; his gift was that he spoke the language of the people, not the scholar. He preached much while still a student and in 1857 he was ordained an evangelist and began preaching to large audiences, as well as in the open air. Visited many cities and towns in the British Isles. During this time it is claimed that he was persecuted by Roman Catholics.

From 1858 to 1860 he was in Canada and had a part in A. B. Simpson's conversion. He married Fanny Emma Fitzgerald in October 1860. They had a son named Harry, who was born 2 October 1861, in Toronto, Canada.

The Dublin Daily Express wrote in 1858:

Mr. Guinness preached yesterday in York Street Chapel. The attendance was greater than on any former occasion. In the evening it amounted to 1600, and if there were a place large enough, five times the number would have been present, to hear this highly gifted preacher. The interest which he has excited has daily increased and probably will continue to do so, during his labours in Dublin. An enormous crowd pressed for admittance. Judges, members of Parliament, orators, Fellows of College, lights of the various professions, the rank and fashion of the metropolis have been drawn out. Among them the Lord Lieutenant, the Lord Chancellor and the Lord Justice of Appeal, etc.

== Later life ==
The East London Institute (Harley House) training center for missionaries.

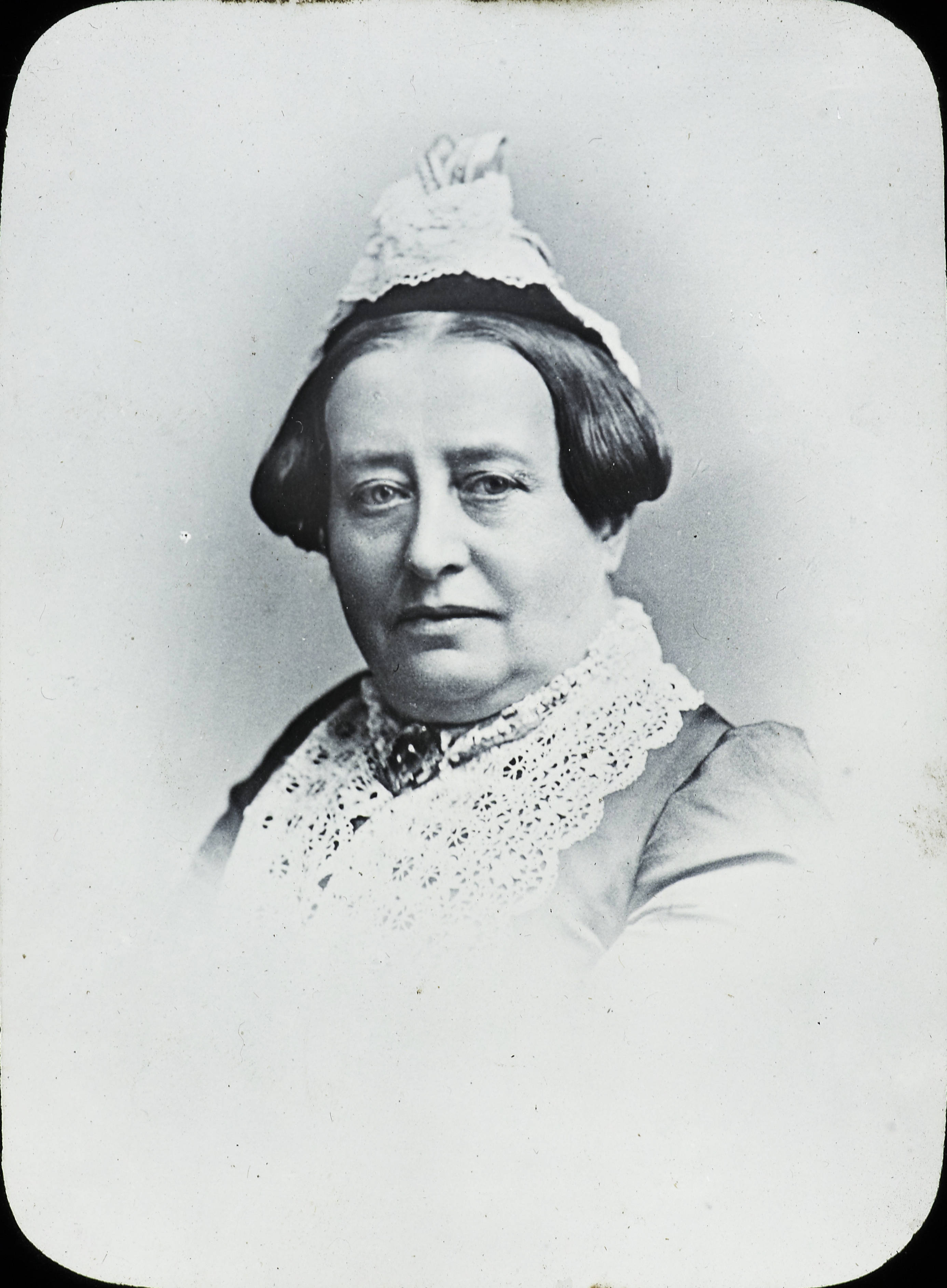
Fanny Grattan Guinness, ca. 1890

From 1860 to 1872 he was a travelling evangelist in France, America, the Near East and the British Isles. He was compared by some to George Whitefield. Fanny was a partner in the missionary work and she was not only responsible for the administration, but she would also preach to audiences of men and women.

He offered to join the China Inland Mission founded by James Hudson Taylor in 1865, but took Taylor's advice to continue his work in London.

In September 1866 while in Keighley, Yorkshire, Guinness saw a notice advertising a series of lectures by the freethinker and communist Harriet Law. For a week he held a series of meetings at the same time to try to counteract her influence. He was appalled at the "scoffing unbelief" of such speakers.

In 1868 he went to France, and helped the Evangelisation Populaire and the McCall Mission. He stayed there 18 months.

In this same year Guinness and his wife published The Regions Beyond and Illustrated Missionary News, which was edited by Mrs. H. Grattan Guinness. The magazine would give accounts of missions and missionaries including those in Africa and China.

With the help of Professor John Couch Adams, some astronomical tables and examination of the scriptures, Guinness worked out the prophetic chronology of the bible in terms of a series of "solilunar cycles." This proved to him that he was living at the end of the sixth unsabbatic day of creation, 6,000 years from Adam, and that the "redemption Sabbath" would soon arrive. This revelation became the subject of many books that he wrote, and many sermons.

In 1872 Henry, Fanny and their six children were living in the East End of London. They started the East London Missionary Training Institute (also called Harley College) at Harley House in Bromley-by-Bow, East End of London with just six students. The renowned Dr. Thomas Barnardo was co-director with Dr. Guinness and greatly influenced by him. The school trained 1330 missionaries for 30 societies of 30 denominations.

Harley College became so successful it needed a larger home. In 1883, Elizabeth Hulme offered Guinness "Cliff House" near Calver, Derbyshire. Harley College was renamed Hulme Cliff College. Now known as Cliff College, it still trains and equips Christians for mission and evangelism.

In 1873 Guinness founded the East London Institute for Home and Foreign Missions, the root of the Regions Beyond Missionary Union. In 1877 he founded the Livingstone Inland Mission, which worked in Congo, Argentina and Peru. His son Dr. Henry Grattan Guinness (1861–1915), known as Harry to distinguish him from his father, founded the Congo-Balolo Mission in 1888 and co-founded the Congo Reform Association in 1904. He traveled to India, where he wrote critically that to the people there, "God is everything, and everything is God, and, therefore, everything may be adored. ... Her pan-deism is a pandemonium."

His first wife having died in 1898, he married his second wife Grace Alexandra Hurditch in 1903.

From 1903 to 1907, they went on world missionary tours before he retired in 1908 to Bath, Somerset, where he died.

== Legacy ==
His daughter, and later author, Mary Geraldine Guinness married Frederick Howard Taylor, the son of China Inland Mission founder J. Hudson Taylor. She was one of seven children who entered Christian ministry. Dr. Gershom Whitfield Guinness was a medical missionary to China who escaped the Boxer Rebellion and went on to found the first hospital in Henan south of the Yellow River.

A granddaughter, Ruth Eileen, married the famous geneticist and statistician Ronald Fisher, one of those responsible for Neo-Darwinism.

His daughter Lucy wrote Across India at the Dawn of the 20th Century, about her hopes of converting the heathen natives to Christianity.

His great-grandson Os Guinness is an active author and speaker today.

== Quote ==
I do now most heartily desire to live but to exalt Jesus; to live preaching and to die preaching; to preach to perishing sinners till I drop down dead.
