= Thomas Heazle Parke =

Irish physician and British army officer

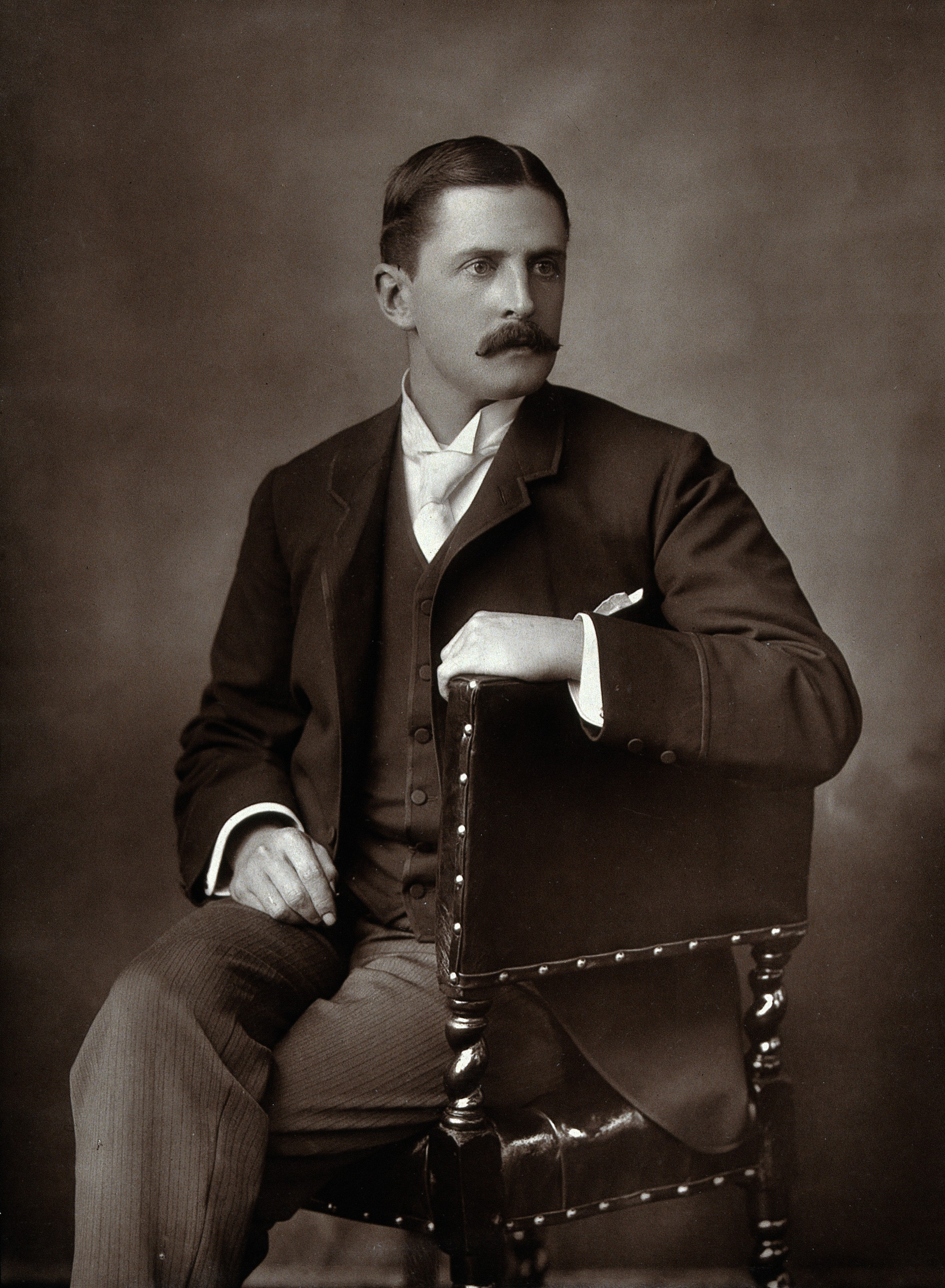
- Thomas Heazle Parke by Herbert Rose Barraud
- Born: 27 November 1857; Kilmore, County Roscommon, Ireland
- Died: 11 September 1893 (aged 35); Ardrishaig, Argyllshire, Scotland
- Burial place: Drumsna, County Roscommon, Ireland
- Military career
- Allegiance: United Kingdom
- Branch: British Army
- Rank: Surgeon-major
- Unit: Army Medical Services
- Other work: Physician; explorer; author; naturalist

Thomas Heazle Parke FRSGS (1857–1893) was an Irish physician, British Army officer and author who was known for his work as a doctor on the Emin Pasha Relief Expedition.

== Early life ==
Parke was born on 27 November 1857 at Clogher House in Kilmore, County Roscommon, Ireland. and was brought up in Carrick-on-Shannon, County Leitrim. He attended the Royal College of Surgeons in Ireland in Dublin, graduating in 1878. He became a registered medical practitioner in February 1879, working as a dispensary medical officer in Ballybay, and then as a surgeon in Bath, Somerset.

== Military career ==
Parke joined the British Army Medical Services in February 1881 as a surgeon, first serving in Egypt during the final stages of the ʻUrabi revolt in 1882. As a senior medical officer at a field hospital near Cairo, Parke was responsible for treating battle casualties as well as the deadly cholera epidemic that afflicted 20% of British troops stationed there. In late 1883, Parke returned to Ireland, where he was stationed at Dundalk with the 16th The Queen's Lancers. He arrived in Egypt once again in 1884 as a part of the Nile Expedition sent in relief of General Charles Gordon, who was besieged in Khartoum by Mahdists in neighbouring Sudan. The expedition arrived too late and Gordon was killed; Parke would later negatively recount this experience in an 1892 journal article titled How General Gordon Was Really Lost. Following the expedition, Parke spent the next few years stationed in Alexandria, where he notably introduced fox hunting to Egypt, becoming master of the Alexandria Hunt Club.

== Emin Pasha Relief Expedition ==
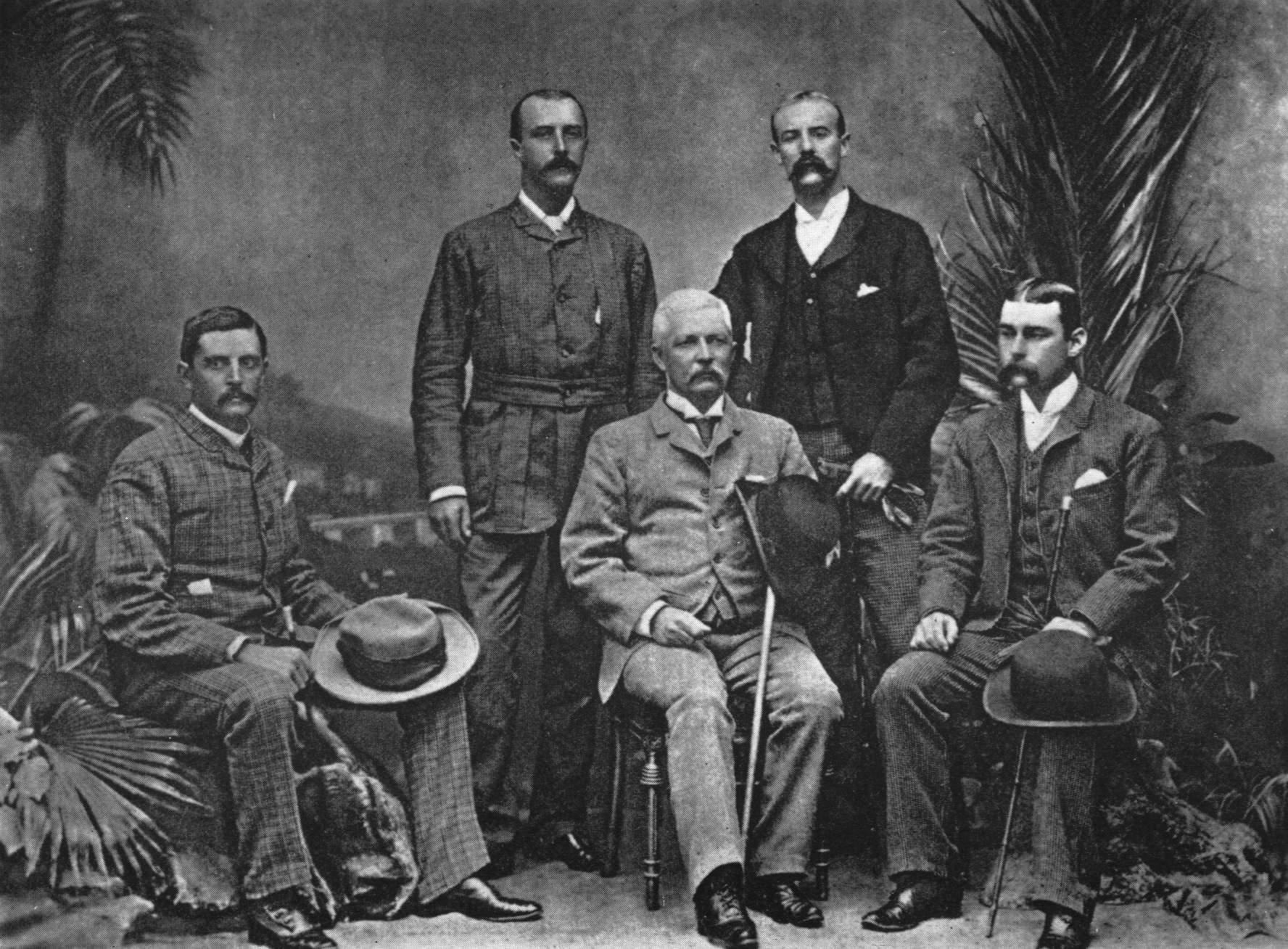
Henry M Stanley with the officers of the Advance Column, Cairo, 1890. From the left : Dr. Thomas Heazle Parke, Robert H. Nelson, Henry M. Stanley, William G. Stairs, and Arthur J. M. Jephson

In January 1887, while in Alexandria, Parke was invited by Edmund Musgrave Barttelot to accompany him on the Emin Pasha Relief Expedition. The expedition would be led by Henry Morton Stanley, and would journey through the African wilderness in relief of Emin Pasha, an Egyptian administrator who had been cut off by Mahdist forces following the Siege of Khartoum. Parke was initially rejected by Stanley upon his arrival in Alexandria, but was invited by telegram a day later to join the expedition in Cairo. On 25 February 1887, the expedition set off from Zanzibar in the east for the Congo in the east.

The expedition lasted for three years and faced great difficulty, with the expedition of 812 men suffering from poor logistical planning and leadership. The rainforest was much larger than Stanley expected, leading much of the party to face starvation and disease. Parke, for his part, saved the lives of many in the party, including Stanley, who suffered from acute abdominal pain and a bout of sepsis. Stanley described Parke's care as "ever striving, patient, cheerful and gentle…most assiduous in his application to my needs, and gentle as a woman in his ministrations". Parke also treated Arthur Jephson for fever, and nursed Robert H. Nelson through starvation. Furthermore, after a conflict with the natives, Parke had to save William Grant Stairs by orally sucking the poison out of an arrow wound.

During the expedition, Parke purchased from an Arab slaver a Mangbetu Pigmy girl, who would serve as his nurse and servant for over a year.

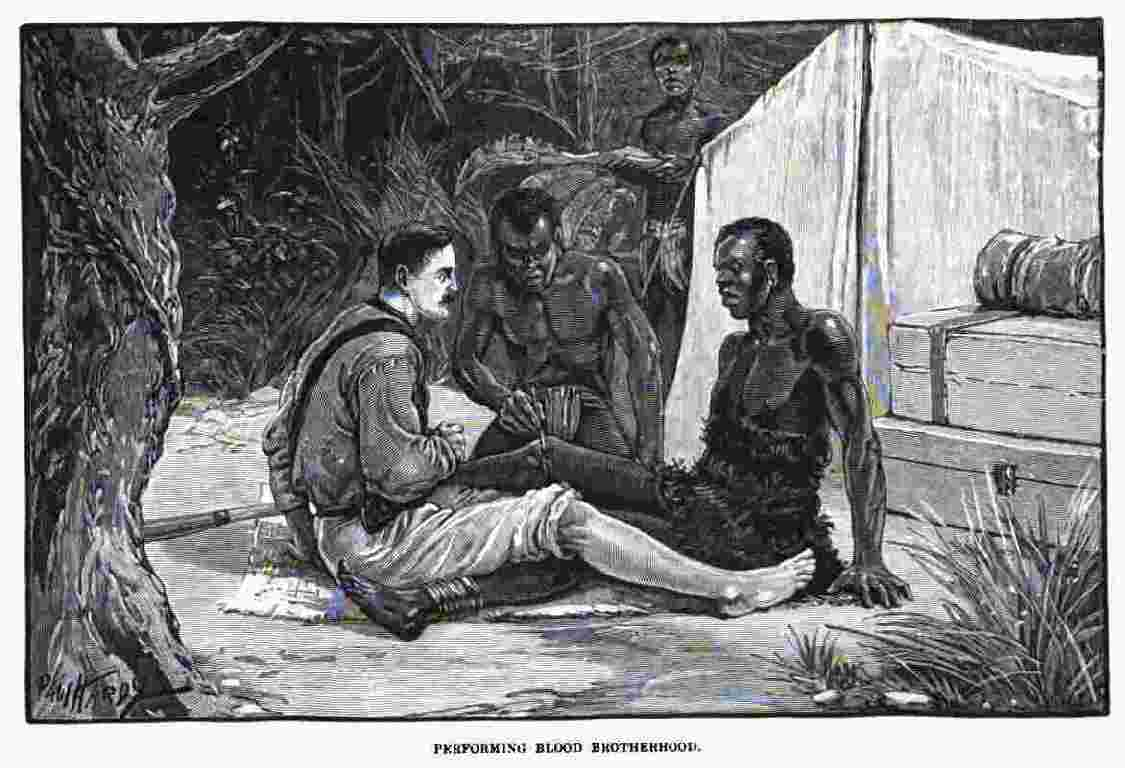
Parke undergoing blood brotherhood ritual with an African

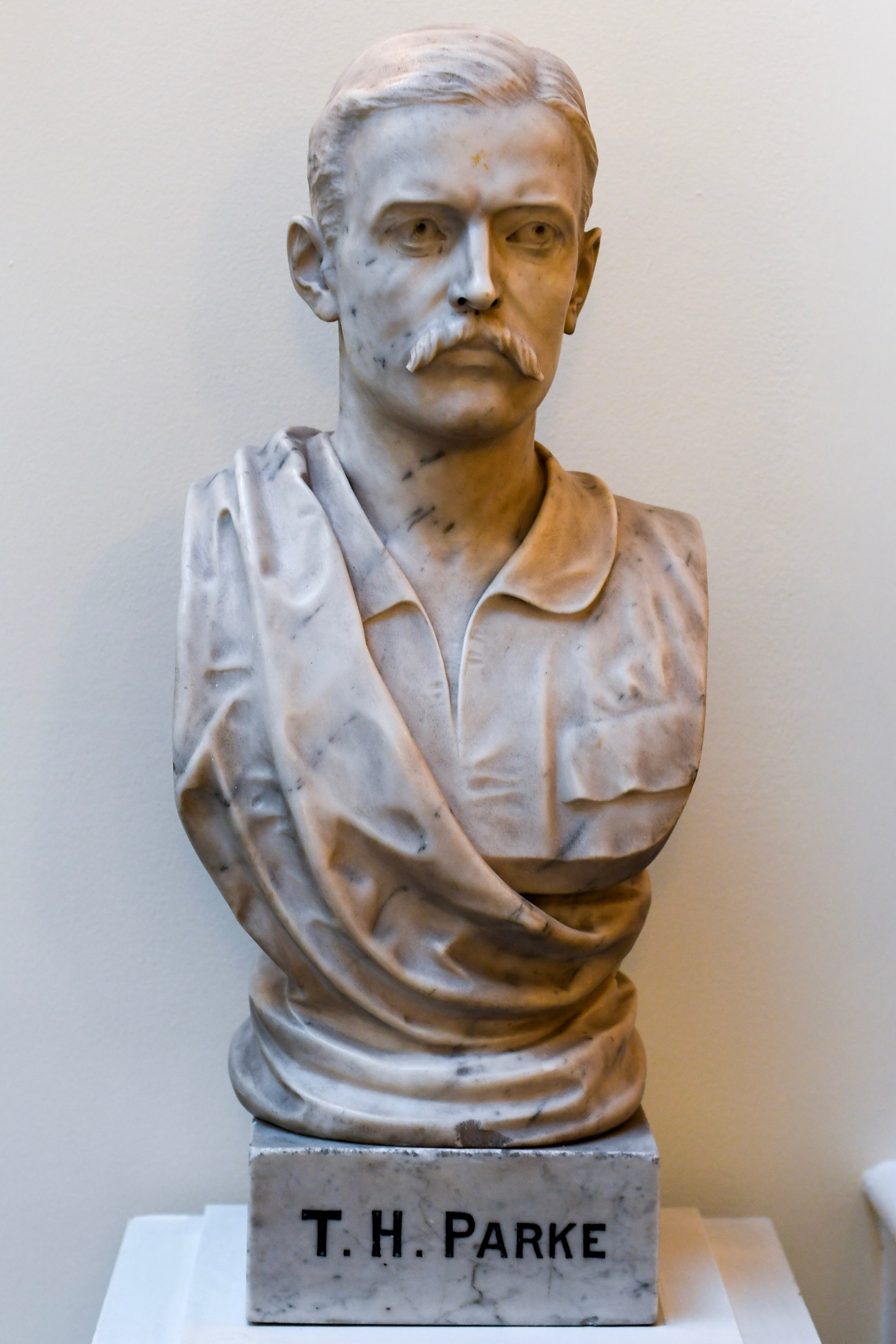
Bust of T.H. Parke in the Royal College of Surgeons Dublin, by Herbert G. Barnes (1895)

== Later life ==
After returning to Ireland, Parke received an Honorary Fellowship of the Royal College of Surgeons in Ireland and was awarded gold medals from the British Medical Association and the Royal Geographical Society. He published several books, including My Personal Experiences in Equatorial Africa (published in 1891) and A Guide to Health in Africa.

In August 1893, Parke visited William Beauclerk, 10th Duke of St Albans in Ardrishaig, Scotland. He died during that visit on 11 August 1893, presumably due to a seizure. His coffin was brought back to Ireland, where he received a military funeral as it passed from the Dublin docks to Broadstone railway station. Parke was buried near his birthplace in Drumsna, County Roscommon.

== Honours ==
A bronze statue of Parke stands on Merrion Street in Dublin, outside the Natural History Museum.

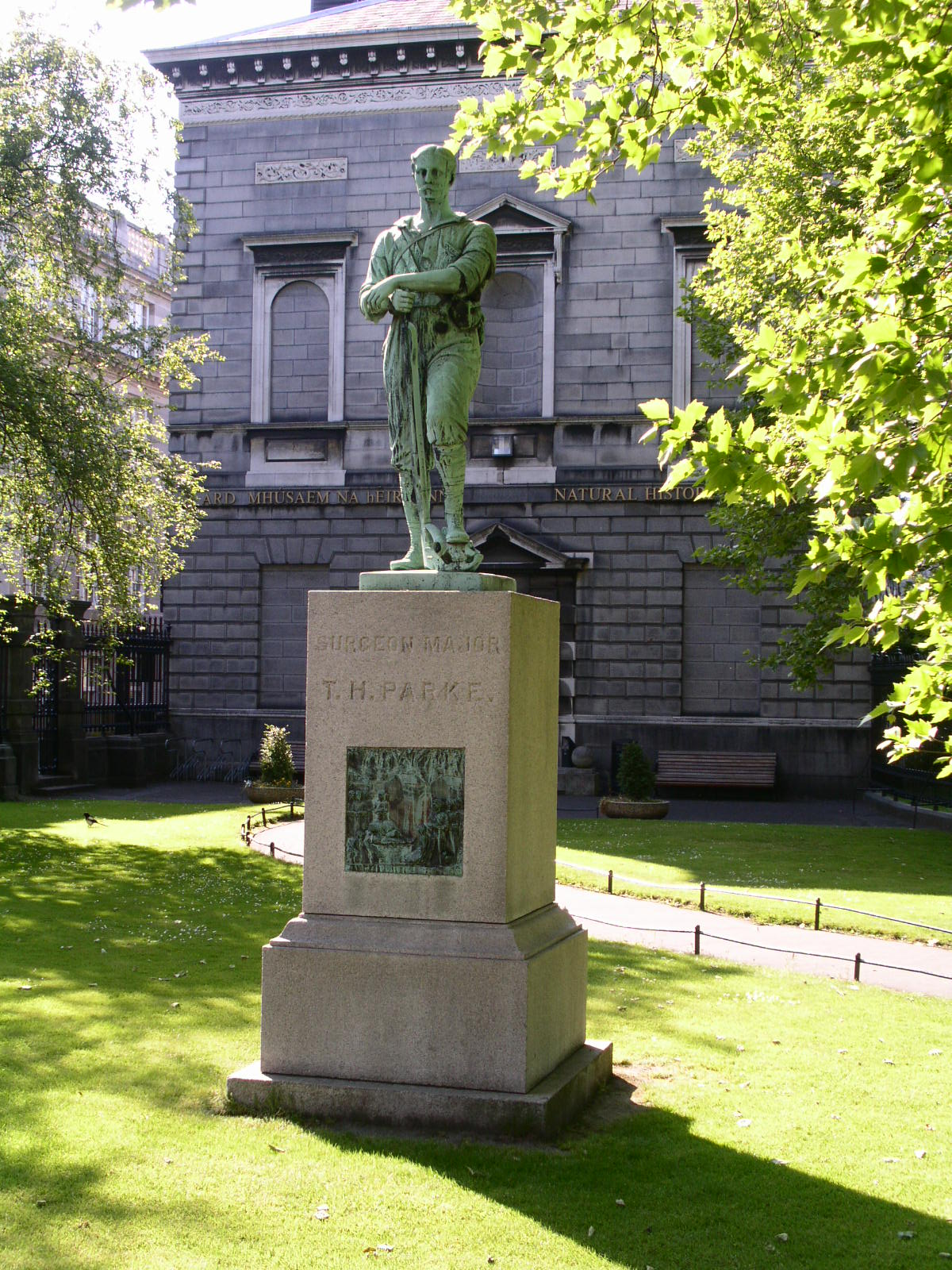
Parke's statue on Merrion Street, Dublin

On the granite pedestal is a bronze plaque depicting the incident on 13 August 1887 when Parke sucked the poison from an arrow wound in the chest of Capt. William G. Stairs to save his life. He is also commemorated by a bust in the Royal College of Surgeons in Ireland.
