= Iain R. Smith =

British historian (1939–2021)

Iain Robertson Smith
- Born: 16 July 1939; Kingston upon Hull
- Died: 7 December 2021 (aged 82); Leamington Spa
- Education: University of Edinburgh, University of Wisconsin, University of Oxford
- Occupations: historian, educator
- Employer: University of Warwick
- Spouse: Teresa Halikowska (m. 1968; died 2020)
- Children: 2 sons and 1 daughter

Iain Robertson Smith (16 July 1939 - 7 December 2021) was emeritus reader in history at the University of Warwick. He was a specialist in the history of South Africa and the South African War in particular. Smith was a member of Council of The Historical Association from 1980 to 1995 and editor of the New Appreciations in History series.

== Early life and education ==
Iain Smith was born on 16 July 1939 in Hull. His father was Alexander Smith, a dentist, and his mother was Amy (née Cheetham) Smith. He attended Bootham School in York and received his advanced education at the University of Edinburgh (M.A.) and the University of Wisconsin (M.A.) where he was a Fulbright Scholar. He earned his D.Phil. from St. Antony's College, University of Oxford.

== Career ==
Smith was reader in history at the University of Warwick. He was a specialist in the history of South Africa and the South African War in particular. His book on The origins of the South African War, 1899–1902 (1996) was welcomed in Afrikaans circles but criticised by some English speaking scholars as too limited in scope. Kobus du Pisani in H-Net praised it for its "old-fashioned approach, maintaining a strong narrative line" but also criticised the book as "one-sided" and for failing to examine contemporary Boer sources. Smith contributed to a reappraisal of the Siege of Mafeking and was researching the concentration or internment camps, established for Boer and Black civilians in South Africa by the British.

He was a member of Council of The Historical Association from 1980 to 1995 and editor of the New Appreciations in History series. He held visiting academic positions at the University of Cape Town (1989), University of Pretoria (1993, 2001), Institute of Commonwealth Studies London (1987), Mansfield College Oxford (1997), University of Tbilisi, Georgian Republic (1991), and the Institute of Historical Research, Helsinki (1998).

== Selected publications ==
=== Books ===
- The Emin Pasha relief expedition 1886–1890. Oxford: Clarendon Press. 1972. ISBN 978-0198216797 – via Internet Archive.
- The origins of the South African War 1899–1902. London: Longman. 1996. ISBN 978-0582495203 – via Internet Archive.
- The siege of Mafeking. 2 vols. The Brenthurst Press, Johannesburg, 2001.

=== Articles ===
- "The origins of the South African War: a reappraisal", South African Historical Journal, 22 (November 1990).
- "Jan Smuts and the South African War", South African Historical Journal, 41 (November 1999).
- "The revolution in South African historiography", History Today, February 1988.
- "New Lessons in South Africa's History", History Today, July 1993.
- "The Boer War Diary of Charlie Moses", History Today, May 1998. (with Fransjohan Pretorius)
