= Jessie Macfarlane =

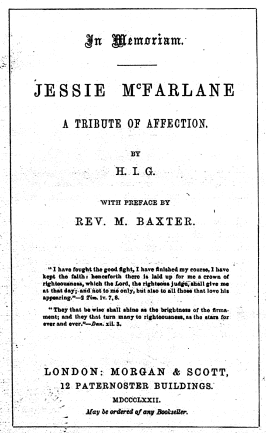
- In Memoriam
- Born: Jessie Brodie; 20 January 1843; Edinburgh
- Died: 18 August 1871 (aged 28); Liberton
- Occupation: preacher

Jessie Macfarlane married name Jessie Brodie (20 January 1843 – 18 August 1871) was a Scottish evangelical preacher involved with the Third Great Awakening. She spoke in Scotland and England until 1869.

== Life ==
Macfarlane was born in 1843 in Edinburgh. Her presbyterian parents were Mary Maxwell (born Turner) and Archibald McFarlane. Her father was a skilled tailor and her uncle was probably a church minister. It was the lay preacher Brownlow North talking at Free St Lukes Church who inspired her to take an interest in religion in 1859 and she attended more revivalist meetings. According to her account she heard "Just as I am" at the end of 1860 and Charlotte Elliott's hymn inspired her to become an evangelist.

In January 1861 she was at a women's meeting when she was inspired to begin preaching. It went well and she went to other meetings where she was invited to preach. She went to the Scottish Borders where the hymn writer Horatius Bonar arranged her calendar in Kelso. Bonar was a minister and hymn writer in the Free Church of Scotland and while Macfarlane was there the town had a growth in evangelism. In 1862 she was on the east coast of Scotland at Gullane and her meeting included women but men also gathered around the building. Macfarlane agreed to let people into her meeting irrespective of their gender. Some people objected to mixed meetings including her fiancé who decided to break off their engagement.

In 1866 she became an itinerant preacher in England speaking in cities including London, Manchester and Ipswich. In 1869 she married David Brodie, a Scottish physician from Liberton, at Marylebone in London. Macfarlane died young in Liberton in 1871. Her husband survived her. In memoriam Jessie McFarlane was published and this book included her justification for women preaching which was based on scripture.
