= Fanny Grattan Guinness =

British writer and evangelist

Fanny Guinness
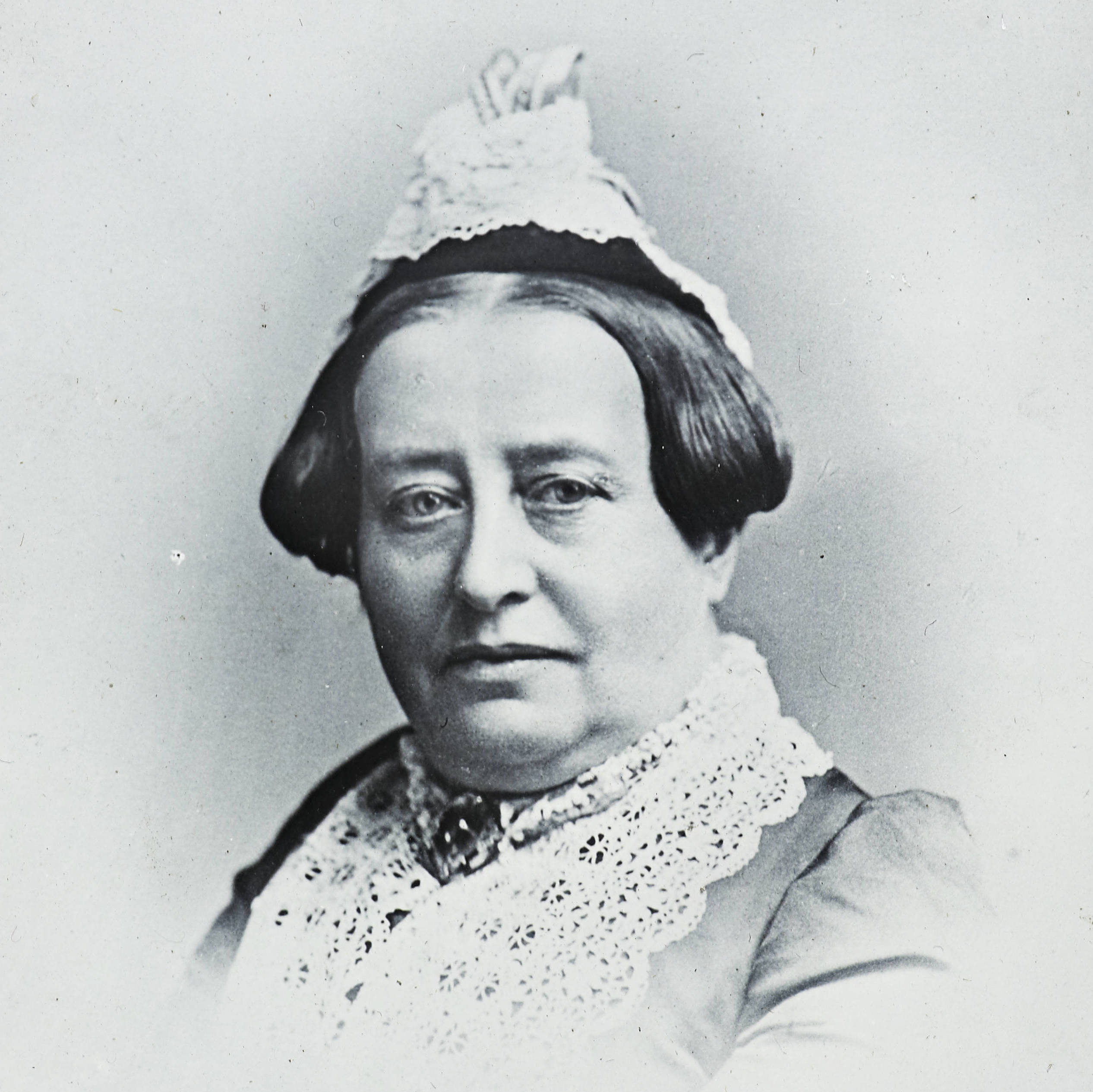
- Born: Fanny Emma FitzGerald; 1831; London
- Died: 3 November 1898 (aged 66–67)
- Other names: Mrs. H. Grattan Guinness (nom de plume)
- Occupations: Magazine editor, writer, organiser
- Spouse: Henry Grattan Guinness

Fanny Grattan Guinness born Fanny Emma Fitzgerald writing as Mrs. H. Grattan Guinness (1831 – 3 November 1898) was a British writer, evangelist and trainer of missionaries.

== Life ==
Guinness was born in 1831 in London. She became an orphan after her mother died and her father took his own life. She was taken in by the family's solicitor who in time also took his own life. She set out to teach.

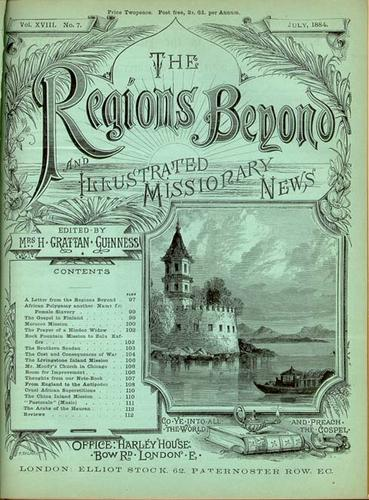
The Regions Beyond magazine for July 1884

She married Henry Grattan Guinness in October 1860. They had a son named Harry, who was born October 2, 1861, in Toronto, Canada.

Henry was her partner in the missionary work and she was not only responsible for the administration, but she would also preach to audiences of men and women.

In 1868 Guinness and his wife published The Regions Beyond and Illustrated Missionary News, which was edited by Mrs. H. Grattan Guinness. The magazine would give accounts of missions and missionaries including those in Africa and China.

In 1872 Henry, Fanny and their six children were living in the East End of London. They started the East London Missionary Training Institute.

== Legacy ==
Her daughter, and later author, Mary Geraldine Guinness married Frederick Howard Taylor. She was one of seven children who entered Christian ministry. Dr. Gershom Whitfield Guinness was a medical missionary to China who escaped the Boxer Rebellion and went on to found the first hospital in Henan south of the Yellow River. Her daughter Lucy wrote Across India at the Dawn of the 20th Century, about her hopes of converting the heathen natives to Christianity.

== Works ==
- The First Mission on the Congo, 1862
- She Spake of Him: Being Recollections of the Loving Labours and Early Death of the Late Mrs. Henry Dening, 1872
- The wide world and our work in it: or, the story of the East London Institute for Home and Foreign Missions, 1886
- The new world of Central Africa. With a history of the first Christian mission on the Congo, 1890
- Congo recollections, Edited 1890
