= Livingstone Inland Mission =

- Formation: 1878
- Dissolved: 1884
- Type: Mission Society

The Livingstone Inland Mission (LIM) was an evangelical missionary society that operated in what is now the Democratic Republic of the Congo between 1878 and 1884.

== Foundation ==
The moving spirit in founding the society in 1877 was the Baptist pastor Alfred Tilly. He gained support from the Cory brothers of Cardiff, and called on Henry Grattan Guinness and his wife Fanny to launch a mission to the interior of the Congo. Alfred Tilly resigned as secretary in October 1880 and was replaced by Fanny Guinness, a superb administrator, with the mission becoming part of the East London Institute for Home and Foreign Missions.

Fanny Guinness recorded a cautionary note concerning funding in the constitution of the society in her 1890 book:

"That as it is the aim of this mission to introduce into the vast Congo Valley as many Christian evangelists as possible, and as it is believed that land and native labour can be secured at small cost, the agents of the mission shall be men willing to avail themselves of these advantages, and resolved to be as little burdensome as possible to the funds of the mission. No salaries are guaranteed, but the committee as far as the means of doing so are placed in their hands, will supply the missionaries with such needful things as cannot be produced in the country".

== Activity ==
The first missionaries to reach the Congo were Henry Craven of Liverpool, and Strom, a Danish sailor. They reached Matadi in February 1878. In March 1880, Adam McCall launched an expedition to travel up the navigable section of the river 100 miles (160 km) to Yellala Falls, then force its way up the 232 miles (373 km) stretch of rapids and obstacles to Stanley Pool. With great difficulty the expedition got as far as Bemba by the end of October, when the rains began and prevented all further progress. Meanwhile the Henry Reed, a 71 feet (22 m) wood-burning steamer with a shallow draft had been shipped out from England in sections. It was carried up the river to Stanley pool by 1,000 porters, reaching Leopoldville in April 1881, and after assembly was launched on 24 November 1881. The mission also acquired the 40 feet (12 m) steam launch Livingstone, launched on the lower Congo in May 1881.

By 1881 the mission had established four missions on the lower Congo. That year they made their first converts, who traveled back to London for the first baptism in 1882. In the first five years, three men and one woman died. By 1884 the LIM had scattered missions along the south shore of the Congo as far as Stanley pool, but their sponsors were running into financial difficulty. The American Baptist Missionary Union offered to take over the operation, and the LIM was glad to accept. In April 1887, on his expedition to rescue Emin Pasha, Henry Morton Stanley found when he reached Stanley Pool that the boats he had been promised were not available. He forced the LIM missionaries to lend him the Henry Reed.

== Sources ==
- Conley, Joseph F. (2000). Drumbeats that changed the world: a history of the Regions Beyond Missionary Union and the West Indies Mission, 1873-1999. William Carey Library. ISBN 0-87808-603-X.
- Duignan, Peter; Gann, Lewis H. (1987). The United States and Africa: A History. Cambridge University Press. ISBN 0-521-33571-X.
- Guinness, Mrs. H. Grattan (1890). The new world of Central Africa: With a history of the first Christian mission on the Congo. Hodder and Stoughton.
- Kingston, William Henry Giles (1890). Great African travellers from Bruce and Mungo Park to Livingstone and Stanley.
