= John Robert Morrison =

British interpreter and colonial official

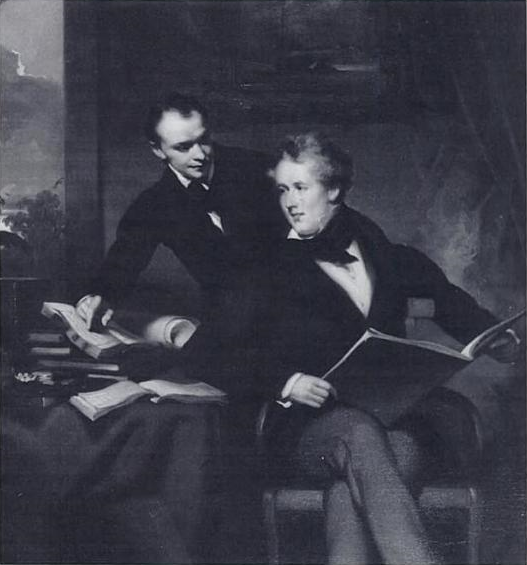
- Morrison (right) with a colleague. Painted by George Chinnery.

Colonial Secretary of Hong Kong (Acting)
- In office 21 August 1843 – 29 August 1843
- Governor: Sir Henry Pottinger
- Preceded by: George Malcolm
- Succeeded by: Frederick Wright-Bruce

Member of the Legislative Council
- In office 6 April 1843 – 29 August 1843
- Appointed by: Sir Henry Pottinger
- Constituency: Official (as Chinese Secretary)

Personal details
- Born: 17 April 1814 Macau
- Died: 29 August 1843 (aged 29) Hong Kong
- Resting place: Old Protestant Cemetery, Macau
- Parent(s): Robert Morrison; Mary Morton
- Profession: Interpreter, colonial official

John Robert Morrison (traditional Chinese: 馬儒翰; simplified Chinese: 马儒翰; pinyin: Mǎrúhàn; 17 April 1814 – 29 August 1843) was a British interpreter and colonial official in China. Born in Macau, his father was Robert Morrison, the first Protestant missionary in China. After his father's death in 1834, Morrison replaced him as Chinese Secretary and Interpreter to the Superintendents of British Trade in China. In 1843, he was appointed as Acting Colonial Secretary of Hong Kong and a member of the Executive and Legislative Councils, but died eight days later in Hong Kong from fever.

== Early life ==
Morrison was born on 17 April 1814 in the Portuguese colony of Macau. He was the second son and third child of missionary Robert Morrison's marriage to Mary Morton. Morrison left Macau on 21 January 1815 with his mother and elder sister aboard a ship bound for England. They returned to Macau on 23 August 1820, but less than two years later his mother died and he was sent back to England to receive an education. Over the next four years, he was educated in Manchester and at Mill Hill Grammar School in London. When his father left for China on 1 May 1826, he took John Robert with him. He learned the Chinese language from his father, and attended the Anglo-Chinese College in Malacca between 1827 and 1830.

== Career in China ==
From 1830, Morrison acted as translator for English merchants in Canton (Guangzhou), China. From 1832 to 1834, he accompanied American merchant and diplomat Edmund Roberts to Siam and Cochin China as his personal secretary and translator. Morrison also compiled a Chinese Commercial Guide to provide information on British trade in China and contributed to Karl Gützlaff's Eastern Western Monthly Magazine, a publication aimed at improving Sino-western understanding.

Morrison succeeded his father in 1834 and was appointed Chinese Secretary to the British East India Company on behalf of the British government. He was then involved in diplomacy during the Opium War from 1839 to 1842, which resulted in the Treaty of Nanking, which he translated. Along with interpreter Robert Thom, he assisted the British expedition up the Broadway River from Macau to Canton in 1841. On 21 August 1843, Hong Kong Governor Henry Pottinger appointed Morrison as Acting Colonial Secretary in the absence of Colonel George Malcolm, and a member of the Executive and Legislative Councils.

== Translation work ==
Apart from official duties, John Morrison continued his father's work of the English Protestant Church in Canton and supported those Chinese converts persecuted by the Chinese authorities. He revised his father's translation of the Bible and appealed to the London Missionary Society to continue its missionary work in Canton. In February 1838, he was made Recording Secretary of the Medical Missionary Society.

In 1840, Walter Henry Medhurst, Karl Gützlaff, Elijah Coleman Bridgman, and Morrison cooperated to translate the Bible into Chinese. The translation of the Hebrew part was done mostly by Gützlaff from the Netherlands Missionary Society, with the exception that the Pentateuch and the book of Joshua were done by the group collectively. This translation, produced in a version of classical Chinese known as High Wen-li (Chinese: 深文理), was completed in 1847 after John Robert's death and is well known due to its adoption by the revolutionary peasant leader Hong Xiuquan of the Taiping Rebellion as the basis for some of the reputed early doctrines of the organisation.

== Death ==
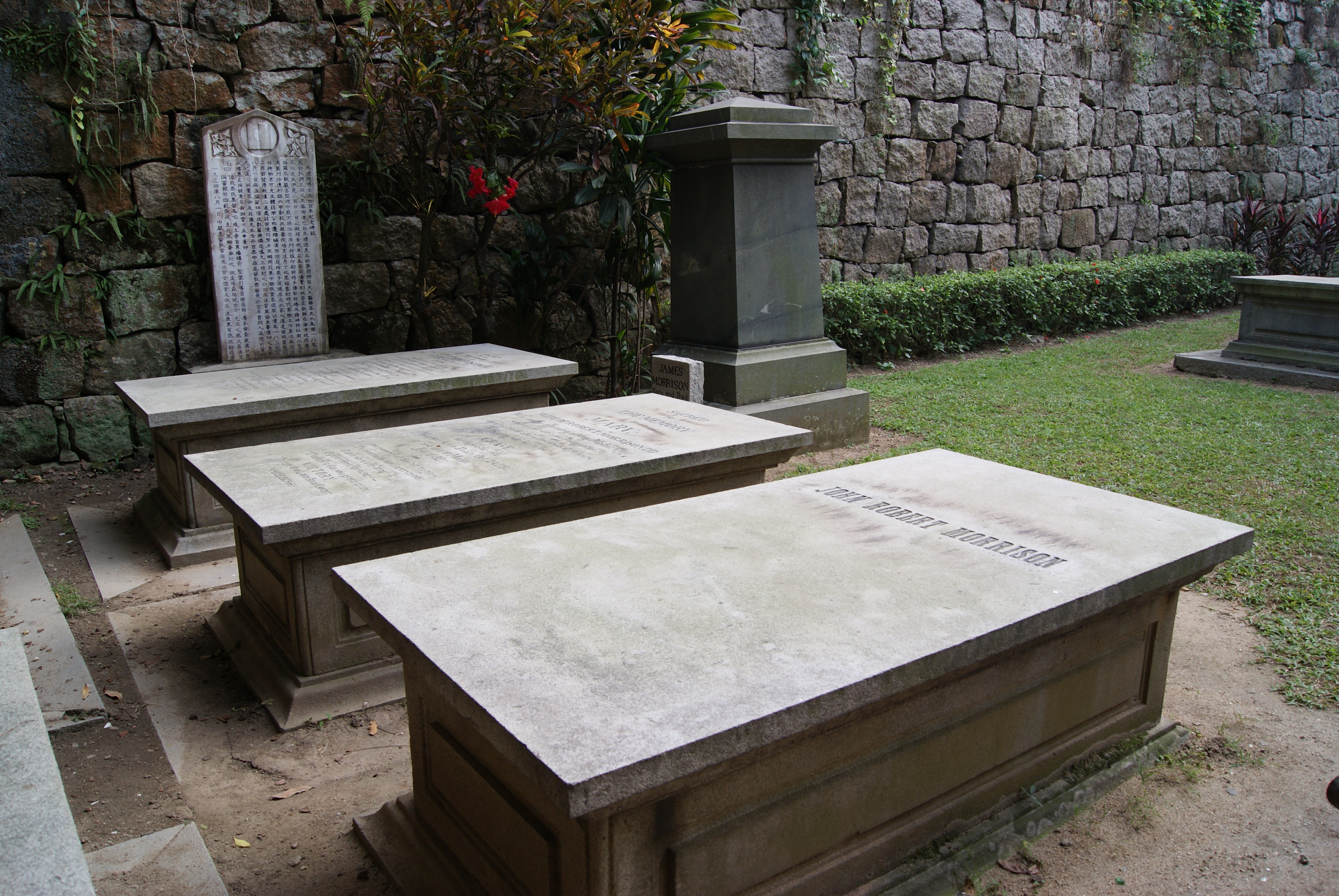
The grave of Morrison in the Old Protestant Cemetery in Macau, next to his parents

Morrison died on 29 August 1843 following a nine-day episode of "Hong Kong fever" (possibly malarial fever). This was the same outbreak in Hong Kong that took the life of fellow missionary Samuel Dyer. Morrison's death was described by the Hong Kong Governor at the time as a "positive national calamity".

He is buried in the Old Protestant Cemetery in Macau, close to the grave of this father.

== Literary works ==
- Companion to the Anglo-Chinese Calendar for 1832.
- Morrison, John Robert (1833). "Some Account of Charms, Talismans, and Felicitous Appendages Worn about the Person, or Hung up in Houses, &c. Used by the Chinese". Transactions of the Royal Asiatic Society of Great Britain and Ireland. 3 (2). Royal Asiatic Society of Great Britain and Ireland: 285–290. doi:10.1017/S0950473700001026. JSTOR 25581754.
- A Chinese Commercial Guide: Consisting of a Collection of Details Respecting Foreign Trade in China. Canton. 1834.

Government offices
Preceded by George Malcolm	Colonial Secretary of Hong Kong (acting); 21–29 August 1843	Succeeded by Sir Frederick Bruce
