= Liang Tingnan =

Chinese scholar (1796–1861)

Liang Tingnan (Chinese: 梁廷枏; pinyin: Liáng Tíngnán; 1796–1861), courtesy name Zhangran (Chinese: 章冉; pinyin: Zhāngrǎn), was a Chinese scholar and writer. A native of Guangdong, he compiled an index on coastal defence in the region and advised numerous state officials. He later led a number of schools and academies. In addition to being a prolific playwright and poet, Liang also wrote extensively on foreign affairs and Chinese history.

== Early life ==
Liang was born in 1796 in Shunde, Guangdong. His father died when he was still a youth, and Liang subsequently devoted himself to academia and writing plays. He resided at a local monastery and spent his free time analysing the iron stupas there, which dated back to the Southern Han.

The Southern Han and another ancient kingdom that covered what became the Guangdong region, Nanyue, became the focus of Liang's historical studies. He wrote six books on the two kingdoms and their rulers, including Nanhan shu (南漢書; 18 juan or volumes, 1830) and Nanyue wuzhu zhuan (南越五主傳; 3 juan, preface dated 1833). Liang also wrote a lengthy biography of Su Shi, in addition to an epigraphical treatise on ancient Chinese stone and bronze inscriptions.

== Career ==
=== Military ===
In 1835, Liang was commissioned to write an index on coastal defence in Guangdong, together with Lin Botong (林伯桐), Zeng Zhao (曾釗), and Wu Lanxiu (吳蘭修). The 42-volume Guangdong haifang huilan (廣東海防彚覽) was first published in 1836, and included maps edited by Yi Kezhong (儀克中). As an expert on foreign policy and coastal defence, Liang conferred with Lin Zexu–a staunch opponent of the opium trade in China–during his visit to Guangdong in 1839.

Liang was later appointed as the superintendent of the Yuehua Academy in Guangzhou by Deng Tingzhen. Still later, he became the director of several schools in Chenghai, as well as the superintendent of the Xuehai Tang Academy in Guangzhou. During the First Opium War, Liang briefly commanded a company in Foshan. He returned to Guangzhou after a ceasefire was reached in late 1841, and became an unofficial advisor to Xu Guangjin and Qi Gong (祁𡎴). In 1850, Liang was awarded with the title of Neige zhongshu (内閣中書, literally Secretary of the Grand Secretriat), in recognition of his military service.

=== Foreign affairs ===
Liang wrote many commentaries on foreign affairs, including Heshengguo shuo (合省國說), which revolves around the United States and was inspired by the writings of Elijah Coleman Bridgman; Lanlun oushuo (蘭侖偶説), concerning Great Britain; and Yuedao gongguo shuo (粤道貢國説), which addresses trade between Guangzhou and foreign countries. Liang praised the American presidential system for its adherence to the principle of shanrang (禪讓) or "non-hereditary succession". He opined that China should emulate the United States, so as to "avoid the upheavals of dynastic change". The anonymous five-volume Yifen jiwen (夷氛記聞), which focuses on China's diplomatic ties and was first published in 1874, is also believed to have been written by Liang.

Liang's Yesujiao nan ru Zhongguo shuo (耶稣教难入中国说) underlines the difficulties faced by Christian missionaries in converting the Chinese people, most of whom subscribed to Confucianism. Liang himself questioned how "a criminal punished by the Roman authorities could be the Savior of humanity." He was also skeptical of the Last Judgment: "Never mind that we do not know how long in the future it will be before judgement takes place, it has already been over a thousand years from the time of Jesus to now — why would judgement take place all at once?"

=== Theatre and poetry ===
Liang was a prolific playwright who wrote at least four operatic plays that had romantic plots and were sung in Cantonese: Tanhua meng (曇花夢), Jiangmei meng (江梅夢), Yuanxiang meng (圓香夢), and Duansi meng (斷絲夢). A four-volume collection of his theatrical reviews, titled Quhua (曲話) was published around 1825. He called The Palace of Eternal Life "one of the greatest masterpieces in the history of Chinese drama."

Liang also produced at least five volumes of prose poetry and fourteen volumes of verse poetry. Through the Eastern Western Monthly Magazine, he was exposed to the works of such Western poets as Homer and John Milton; he wrote about them favourably and remarked that "Westerners also revere poetry writing".
