= Jacob Tomlin =

Protestant Christian missionary (1793–1880)

Jacob Tomlin (1793 — 1880) was a Protestant Christian missionary who served with the London Missionary Society during the late Qing Dynasty in China. Tomlin and Karl Gutzlaff were the first Protestant missionaries to reside in Thailand, arriving in 1828.

== Works authored or edited ==
- Improved Renderings and Explanations of Many Important and Difficult Passages in the Authorised Translation of the Scriptures (1865)
- Missionary Journals and Letters (1844)
