= George Alexander Malcolm =

British Army officer

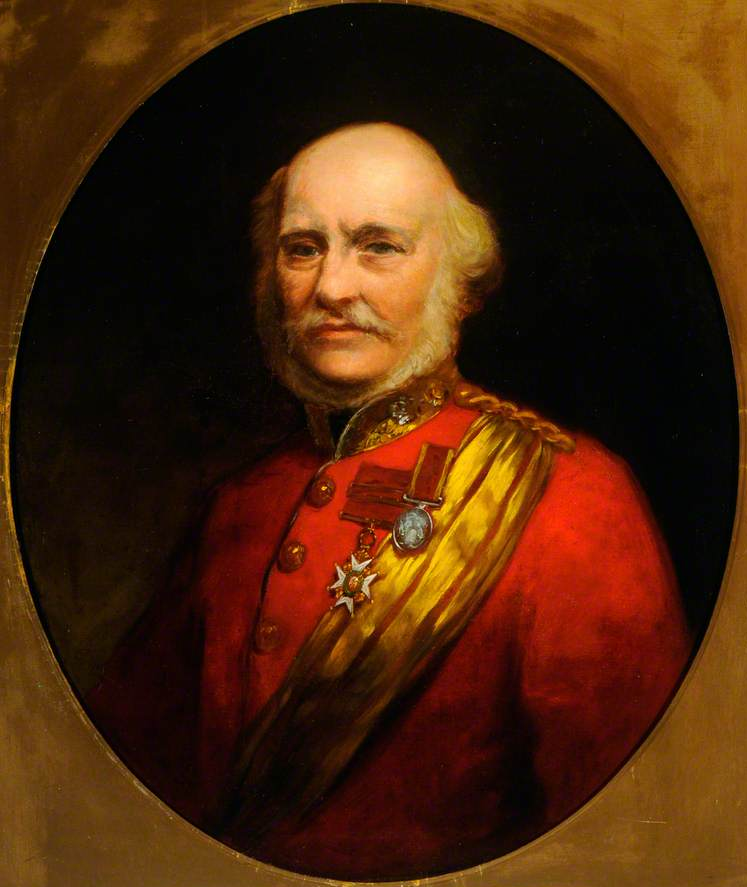
- Oil painting of General Malcolm
- Born: 21 January 1810; Bombay, India
- Died: 2 June 1888 (aged 78); Sloane Street, London, England
- Military career
- Allegiance: United Kingdom
- Branch: British Army
- Rank: General
- Conflicts: First Opium War
- Awards: Companion of the Order of the Bath; China War Medal

General George Alexander Malcolm, CB (21 January 1810 – 2 June 1888), was a British Army officer. He served in the First Opium War and became the first Colonial Secretary of Hong Kong in 1843.

== Career ==
Malcolm was born in Bombay, India, on 21 January 1810. His father, Major-General Sir John Malcolm, was Governor of Bombay. His mother, Isabella Charlotte, was daughter of Lieutenant-General Sir Alexander Campbell.

In 1841, Malcolm sailed to China as Secretary of Legation with Plenipotentiary Henry Pottinger during the First Anglo-Chinese War. On 29 August 1842, British and Chinese officials signed the Treaty of Nanking, which ended the war and ceded Hong Kong to Britain. After the Daoguang Emperor's assent for the treaty arrived in Nanking on 15 September, Malcolm sailed for London the next morning on board the steamer Auckland with a copy for ratification by Queen Victoria. He was made a Companion of the Order of the Bath on 24 December. After Pottinger became the first Governor of Hong Kong, he appointed Malcolm as the first Colonial Secretary on 27 June 1843. Malcolm was also a justice of the peace and served there until November 1843.

On 4 December 1845, Malcolm married Georgiana Harcourt, daughter of Reverend Edward Harcourt, at Bishopthorpe, York, England. In 1858, he was appointed Deputy Adjutant-General at Alexandria to superintend the transit of troops across Egypt to India. By 21 January 1880, he was on the retired list. He died on 2 June 1888 in Sloane Street, London, England. From 1881 to his death, he held the colonelcy of the 2nd Battalion of the King's Own Yorkshire Light Infantry.

== Promotions ==
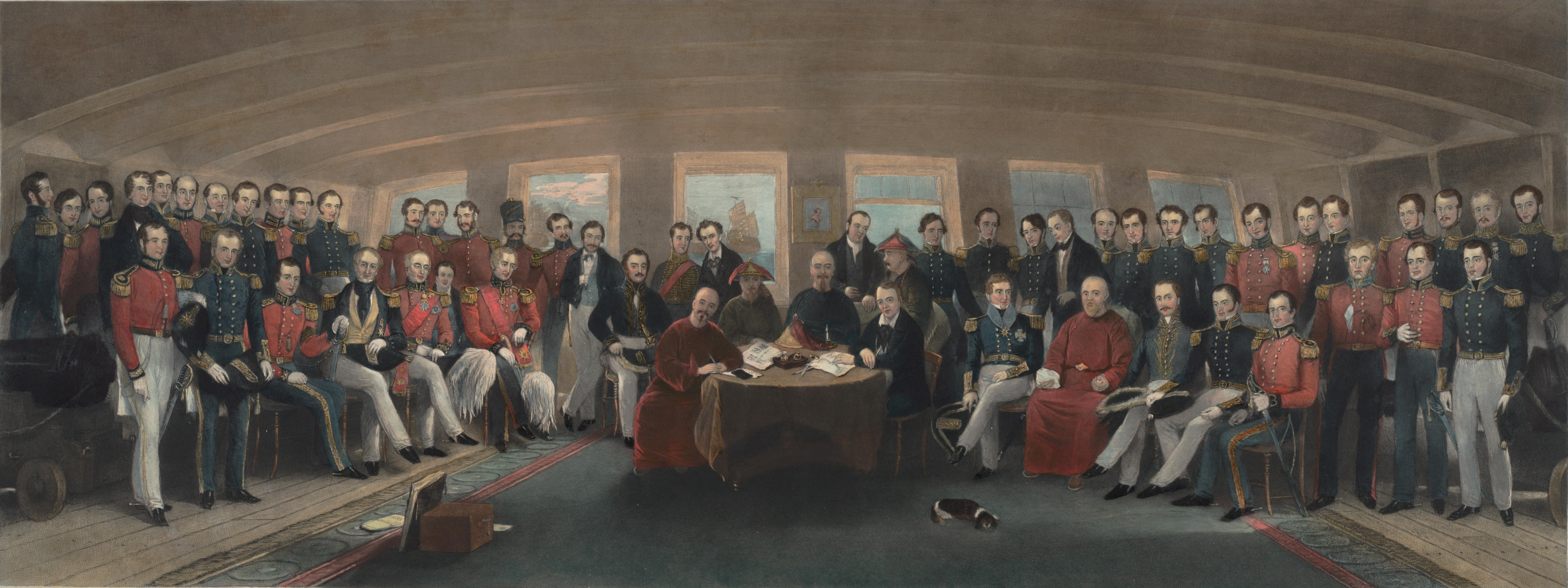
Signing of the Treaty of Nanking (1842). Malcolm is seated at the front row (third from right), between General Hien Ling and Captain Peter Richards.

Malcolm's promotions:

- Ensign, unattached, 31 December 1825
- Ensign, 6th Foot, 26 March 1827
- Lieutenant, 3rd Foot, 7 June 1827
- Captain, 3rd Foot, 30 December 1831
- Captain, 60th Foot, 20 April 1832
- Captain, 3rd Dragoons, 18 December 1835
- Major, 3rd Dragoons, 13 December 1839
- Lieutenant-Colonel (brevet), 3rd Dragoons, 23 December 1842
- Major, unattached, 16 May 1845
- Colonel (brevet), unattached, 20 June 1854
- Major-General, 26 October 1858
- Colonel, 105th Madras Light Infantry, 10 March 1866
- Lieutenant-General, 105th Madras Light Infantry, 8 March 1867
- General, 16 May 1874

Government offices
| New creation | Colonial Secretary of Hong Kong; 1843 | Succeeded by John Morrison (acting) |
