= Karl Gützlaff =

German missionary (1803–1851)

The Reverend Karl Gützlaff
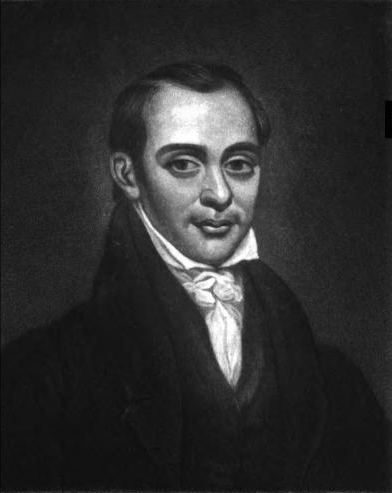
- Born: 8 July 1803; Pyritz, Province of Pomerania, Prussia
- Died: 9 August 1851 (aged 48); British Hong Kong
- Other name: Charles Gutzlaff
- Citizenship: Prussia
- Occupations: Missionary, translator
- Religion: Lutheranism
- Church: Evangelical Church of Prussia
- Writings: Eastern Western Monthly Magazine
- Title: Reverend

Karl Friedrich August Gützlaff (Note: He gave himself the Chinese name, 郭士立 (Sidney Lau: gwok^{3} si^{6} laap^{6}), but later on 郭實腊 (Sidney Lau: gwok^{3} sat^{6} laap^{6}) became his official Chinese name.) (8 July 1803 – 9 August 1851), anglicised as Charles Gutzlaff, was a German Lutheran missionary to the Far East, notable as one of the first Protestant missionaries in Bangkok, Thailand (1828) and the first Lutheran missionary to China (1831-1848). He was a colorful "swashbuckling Pomeranian" who combined his prodigious talent as a prolific Christian author and linguist with participation in the illegal opium trade in 1830s China. He was one of the first Protestant missionaries in China to dress in Chinese clothing and was said to be so proficient in Chinese language and culture that he could pass as Chinese. His books were widely read and his adaptation to Chinese culture served as a model for the later work of missionary Hudson Taylor, founder of the China Inland Mission. In recognition of his travels, often illegal by Chinese law, up and down the Chinese coast, he was elected as a member to the American Philosophical Society in 1839. Controversial during his life, Gützlaff has continued to be so for historians.

During the First Opium War (1839-1842), Gützlaff served as an interpreter for the British government. Afterwards he became a magistrate in Ningbo and Zhoushan and the Chinese Secretary of the British administration in Hong Kong.

== Early life ==
Karl Gützlaff was born in 1803 in Pyritz (present-day Pyrzyce), Pomerania, the son of a tailor, Johann Jacob Gützlaff. He was a brilliant student and his abilities with languages and knowledge of geography brought him to the attention of King Frederick Wilhelm III of Prussia in 1821. The king arranged for him to attend the Mission School of theologian Johann Jänicke in Berlin. After completing the school, Jänicke arranged for him to join the Netherlands Missionary Society for a three-year training course in Rotterdam. The Netherlands Missionary Society sent Gützlaff to Batavia (Java) in 1826. Subsequently, he moved to Singapore where he learned Chinese. Gutzlaff relocated to Bangkok in 1828 where he worked with missionary Jacob Tomlin of the London Missionary Society on a translation of parts of the Bible into Thai, Cambodian, and Lao. However, his main interest was the Chinese language and converting the Chinese to Christianity. He left the Netherlands Missionary Society in 1831, became an independent missionary.

=== Marriages ===
Gützlaff was married three times to three English women. He made a brief trip to Singapore from Bangkok in December 1829 and married an English missionary, Maria Newell. He returned to Bangkok with his wife in February 1830. However, Maria died giving birth to twins in 1831, leaving a considerable inheritance to Gützlaff. Both children soon died. Gützlaff married again in 1834, this time to Mary Wanstall. The second Mrs. Gützlaff ran a school and a home for the blind in Macau. She returned to England in 1839 due to the threat of Civil War but eventually came back to Asia and died in Singapore in 1849. His third wife was Dorothy Gabriel who he married in Europe in September 1849 on a visit there. She accompanied him to Hong Kong in 1851 where he died that same year. Dorothy wrote a biography of him and lived until 1888.

== China missionary (and opium) ==
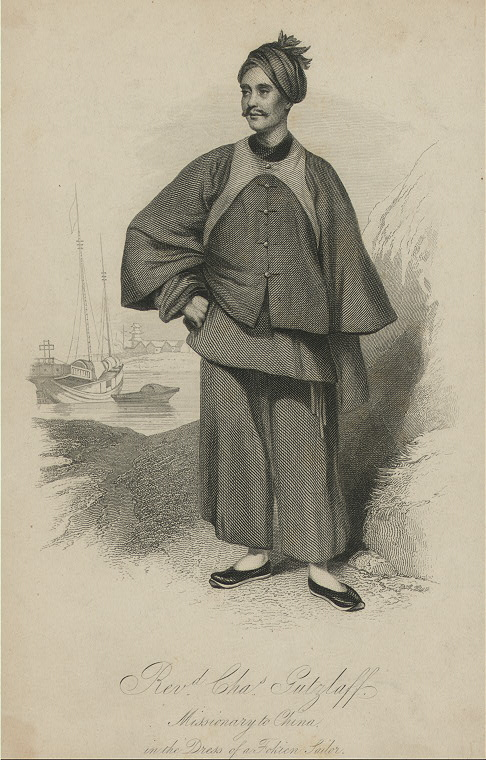
Gützlaff in Fujian clothing

In the late 18th century, the Chinese government had closed all of China to visits or trade by foreigners except for Canton (modern Guangzhou). in June 1831, Gützlaff violated that prohibition on his first visit to China, traveling up and down the coast by sailing ship as far north as Tianjin and defying Chinese government edicts. He spoke Fujianese (a Chinese dialect) fluently and wore Chinese dress.

In November 1831, he took up residence in Macau and later in Hong Kong. In 1832, along with East India Company staff Hugh Hamilton Lindsay, Gutzlaff joined a six-month long clandestine reconnaissance by sea that visited Amoy, Fuzhou, Ningbo, Shanghai and the Shandong coast. In late 1833, he acted as naturalist George Bennett's Cantonese interpreter on his visit to Canton. In these visits to Chinese cities, Gützlaff served as a translator, interpreter, and medical doctor. One of the purposes of these trips was to open China to trade with Britain. While it failed at that, Gützlaff's book, published in 1834, titled Journal of Three Voyages along the Coast of China in 1831, 1832 and 1833 excited interest in expanding trade with China. Gützlaff's book furthered the opinion that China, if pressed hard, would yield to demands that trade be allowed. He also suggested that violence could be useful to help traders and missonaries achieve their objectives. Gützlaff said, "[W]hen an opponent supports his argument with physical force [the Chinese] can be crouching, gentle, and even kind."

Gützlaff's experience and expertise attracted the interest of Scottish traders William Jardine and James Matheson in Canton. Britain had, at the time, a trade deficit with China. The British purchased large quantities of Chinese tea but the Chinese had little interest in purchasing any British products -- except opium which was grown in British India. Jardine and Matheson hired Gützlaff as an interpreter on its opium trading ships clandestinely plying the China coast. They agreed that Gützlaff could distribute Christian literature while on the opium voyages, inspiring the wry comment that while the opium dealers distributed opium off one side of the ship Gützlaff distributed Bibles off the other. Moreover, in addition to the generous, profit-sharing remuneration given Gützlaff, Jardin and Matheson agreed to pay for the publication of Gützlaff's religious tracts and to purchase medicine imported from Britain for Gützlaff to distribute to the Chinese. Thus, an "opium trading, gun and gospel-carrying vessel" owned by a British company with a missionary as an interpreter began trading up and down the Chinese coast in violation of Chinese law. In the minds of many Chinese the opium trade and Christianity were linked.

Gützlaff worked on a Chinese translation of the Bible, published a Chinese-language magazine, Eastern Western Monthly Magazine, and wrote Chinese-language books on practical subjects. In 1840, Gützlaff (under the anglicized name Charles Gutzlaff) became part of a group of four people (with Walter Henry Medhurst, Elijah Coleman Bridgman, and John Robert Morrison) who cooperated to translate the Bible into Chinese. The translation of the Hebrew part was done mostly by Gützlaff, with the exception that the Pentateuch and the Book of Joshua were done by the group collectively. This translation, completed in 1847, is well-known due to its adoption by the revolutionary peasant leader Hong Xiuquan of the Taipingtianguo movement (who started the Taiping Rebellion) as a reputed doctrine of the Taipings.

He was interpreter to the British Plenipotentiary in negotiations during the First Opium War of 1839–42, then magistrate at Ningbo and Zhoushan. He was appointed the first assistant Chinese Secretary of the new colony of Hong Kong in 1842 and was promoted to Chinese Secretary in August of the following year. In response to the Chinese government's unwillingness to allow foreigners into the interior, he founded a school for "native missionaries" in 1844 and trained nearly fifty Chinese during its first four years.

It was observed by a visitor to Hong Kong in 1848 that Gützlaff had turned his back on being a missionary and become a corpulent figure enjoying a large civil service salary.

Unfortunately, Gützlaff's ideas outran his administrative ability. He wound up being victimized by his own native missionaries. They reported back to him glowing accounts of conversions and New Testaments sold. While some of Gützlaff's native missionaries were genuine converts, others were opium addicts who never traveled to the places they claimed. Eager for easy money, they simply made up conversion reports and took the New Testaments which Gützlaff provided and sold them back to the printer who resold them to Gützlaff. The scandal erupted while Gützlaff was in Europe on a fundraising tour. Shattered by the exposure of the fraud, Gützlaff died in Hong Kong in 1851, leaving a £30,000 fortune, equivalent to over 5 million pounds in 2024. He was buried in Hong Kong Cemetery.

== Legacy ==
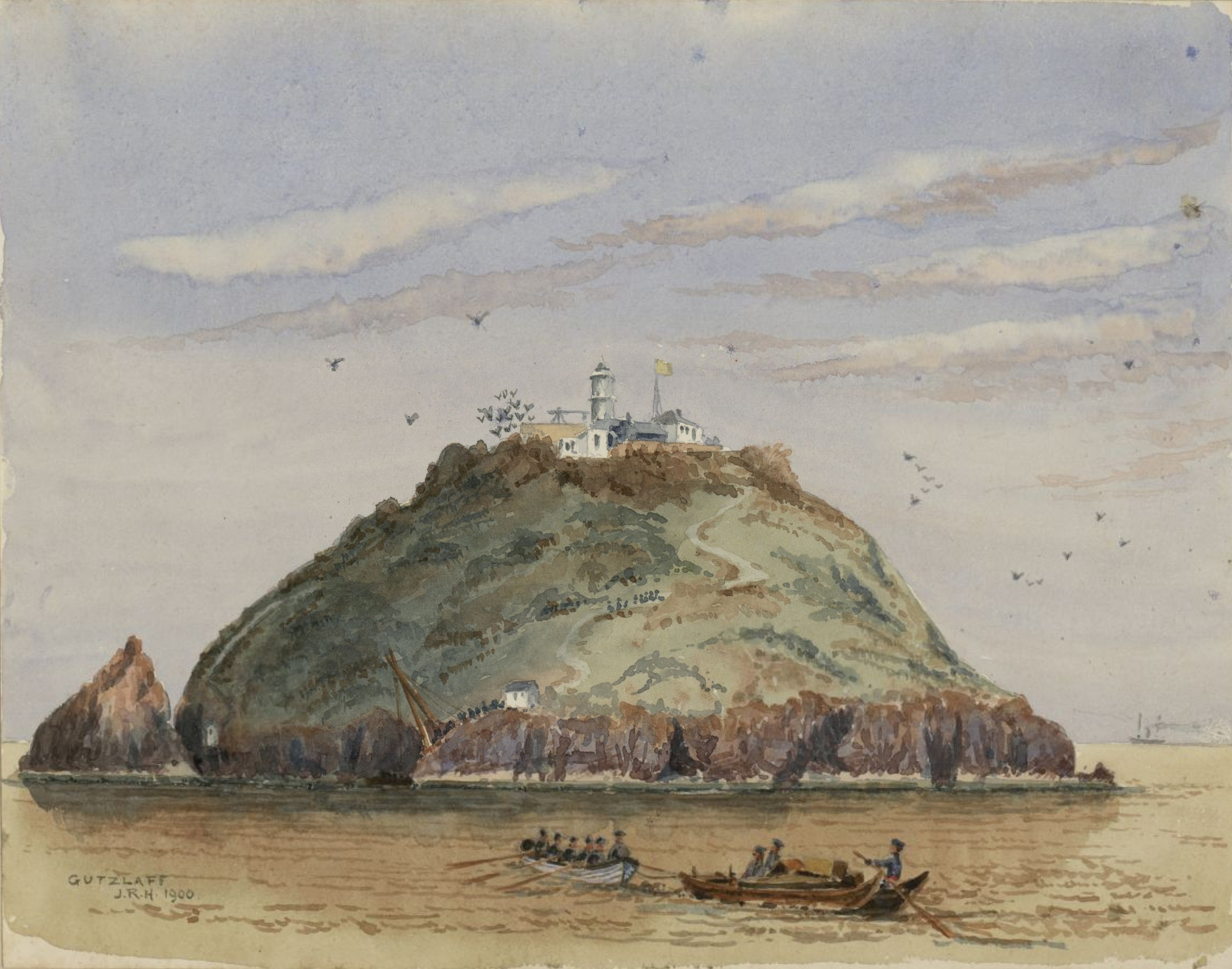
Gutzlaff Island in Zhejiang, China, was named after Karl Gützlaff

The Chinese Evangelization Society which he formed lived on to send out Hudson Taylor who founded the successful China Inland Mission. Taylor called Gützlaff the grandfather of the China Inland Mission.

=== Society for the Diffusion of Useful Knowledge in China ===
On 29 November 1834, Gutzlaff became a member of the newly formed "Society for the Diffusion of Useful Knowledge in China". The committee members represented a wide section of the business and missionary community in Canton: James Matheson (Chairman), David Olyphant, William Wetmore, James Innes, Thomas Fox, Elijah Coleman Bridgman, and John Robert Morrison. John Francis Davis, at that time chief superintendent of British trade in China, was made an honorary member.

Gutzlaff Street in Hong Kong was named after him.

=== Influences ===
Gützlaff's writing influenced both David Livingstone and Karl Marx. David Livingstone read Gützlaff's "Appeal to the Churches of Britain and America on Behalf of China" and decided to become a medical missionary. Unfortunately, it was 1840, and the outbreak of the First Opium War made China too dangerous for foreigners. So the London Missionary Society sent him to Africa, where (in 1871) Henry Morton Stanley would find him working in Ujiji, Tanzania.

While Gützlaff was fundraising in Europe in 1850, Karl Marx went to hear him speak in London. He also read Gützlaff's many writings, which became sources for Karl Marx' articles on China for the London Times and the New York Daily Tribune in the 1840s and 1850s, all of which are anti-imperialist and anti-religion.

=== In fiction ===
The character "Wolfgang Mauss" in James Clavell's novel Tai-pan (1966) is based on Gützlaff.

== Works ==
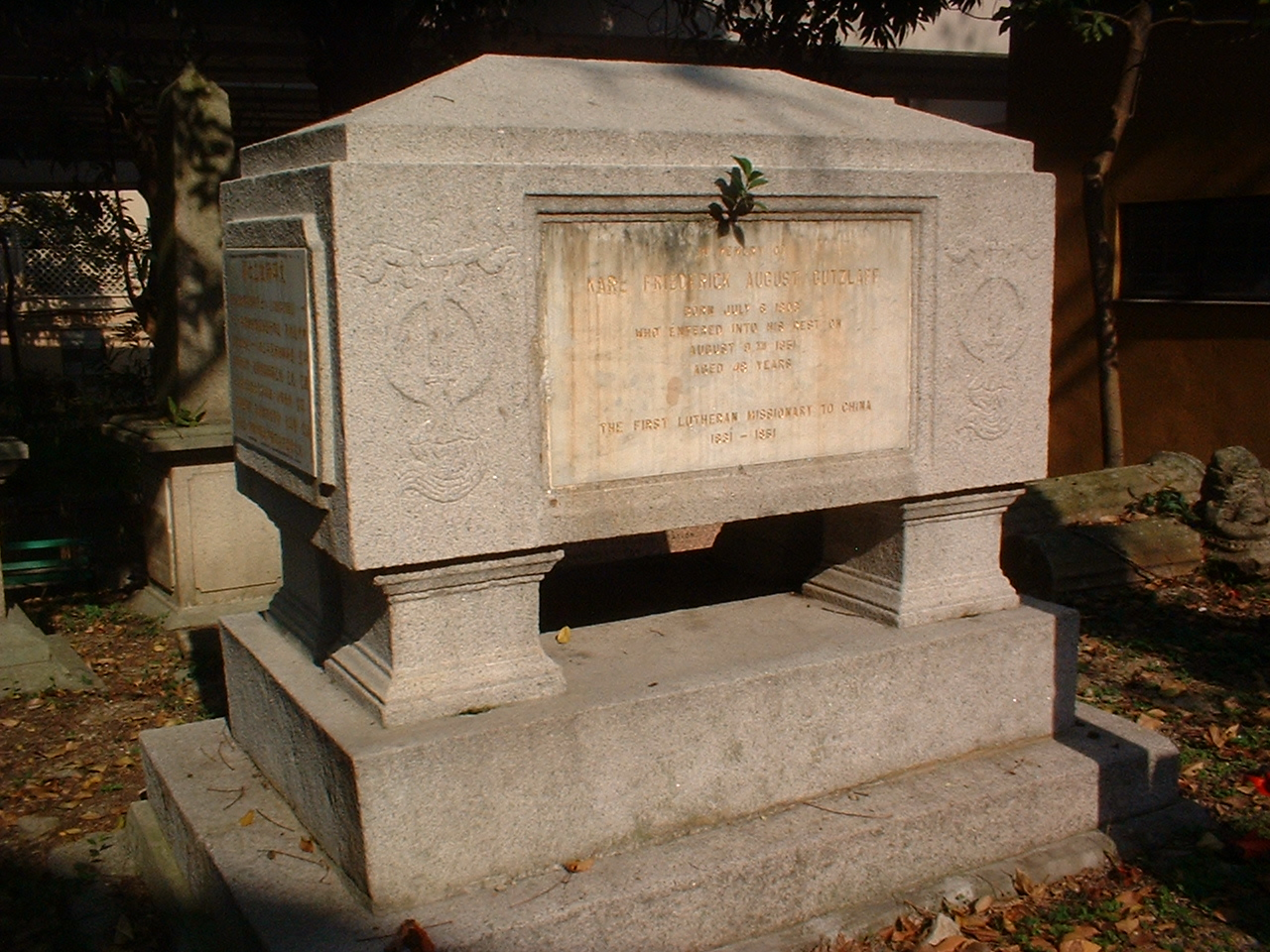
Gutzlaff's grave at Hong Kong Cemetery

- A Sketch of Chinese History, Ancient and Modern (London, 1834, German version in 1847), Volume One, Volume Two
- Karl Friedrich A. Gützlaff (1838). China Opened; or, A Display of the Topography, History ... etc. of the Chinese Empire, revised by A. Reed. Volume One
- China Opened; Or, A Display of the Topography, History, Customs, Manners, Arts, Manufactures, Commerce, Literature, Religion, Jurisprudence, etc. of the Chinese Empire. Vol. 2. London, England: Smith, Elder & Co. 1838.
- Karl Friedrich A. Gützlaff (1840). Journal of Three Voyages Along the Coast of China, in 1831, 1832 and 1833 With Notices of Siam, Corea, and the Loo-Choo Islands.
- Gützlaff, Karl F. A. (1842). Notices on Chinese Grammar: Part I. Orthography and Etymology. Batavia., under pseudonym "Philo-Sinensis"
- Life of Taou-Kwang, Late Emperor of China. London, England: Smith, Elder & Co. 1852.

== Archives ==
Papers of and relating to Karl Gützlaff are held at the Cadbury Research Library, University of Birmingham.

== Bibliography ==
- Lutz, Jessie Gregory. Opening China: Karl F.A. Gützlaff and Sino-Western Relations, 1827–1852. Grand Rapids, Mich.: William B. Eerdmans Pub. Co., 2008. ISBN 080283180X.
- Herman Schlyter, Der China-Missionar Karl Gützlaff und seine Heimatbasis: Studien über das Interesse des Abendlandes an der Mission des China-Pioniers Karl Gützlaff und über seinen Einsatz als Missionserwecker (Lund: LiberLäromedel/Gleerup, 1976) ISBN 91-40-04373-8
- Winfried Scharlau (ed.), Gützlaffs Bericht über drei Reisen in den Seeprovinzen Chinas 1831–1833 (Hamburg: Abera Verlag, 1997) ISBN 3-934376-13-4
- Thoralf Klein/Reinhard Zöllner (eds.), Karl Gützlaff (1803–1851) und das Christentum in Ostasien: Ein Missionar zwischen den Kulturen (Nettetal: Institut Monumenta Serica, Sankt Augustin/Steyler Verlag, 2005) ISBN 3-8050-0520-2
- Waley, Arthur (1968). The Opium War Through Chinese Eyes. Stanford University Press. ISBN 978-0-8047-0611-7.
- Smith, Carl T. (1994). "The German Speaking Community in Hong Kong 1846–1918". Journal of the Hong Kong Branch of the Royal Asiatic Society. 34: 1–55. ISSN 0085-5774.
