= British Hong Kong =

British colony in East Asia (1841–1997)

Coordinates: 22.28°N 114.16°E

Hong Kong 香港
- 1841–1941; (1941–1945: Japanese occupation); 1945–1997
- Flag (1959–1997) Coat of arms (1959–1997)
- Anthem: God Save the Queen; (1841–1901; 1952–1997); God Save the King; (1901–1941; 1945–1952)
- Status: Crown colony (1843–1941; 1945–1982); British Dependent Territory (1983–1997)
- Capital: Victoria (de facto)
- Official languages: English; Chinese (Cantonese) (Note: No specific variety of Chinese was listed in legislation, but Cantonese was the de facto standard as it was the native variety of the colony; Chinese was made official in 1974.)
- Ethnic groups: 98% Chinese; 2% other
- Religion: Christianity; Folk; Buddhism; Taoism; Hinduism; Islam; Judaism; Irreligion
- Demonym: Hongkonger (Note: Hongkonger and Hong Konger were both used by the British administrators of Hong Kong.)
- Government: Unitary parliamentary constitutional monarchy
- Monarch
  - 1841–1901: Victoria
  - 1901–1910: Edward VII
  - 1910–1936: George V
  - 1936: Edward VIII
  - 1936–1941, 1945–1952: George VI
  - 1952–1997: Elizabeth II
- Governor
  - 1843–1844: Sir Henry Pottinger (first)
  - 1992–1997: Chris Patten (last)
- Chief Secretary (Note: The office of Colonial Secretary was renamed to Chief Secretary in 1976.)
  - 1843: George Malcolm (first)
  - 1993–1997: Anson Chan (last)
- Legislature: Legislative Council
- Historical era: Victorian era to 20th century
  - British occupation, signed by Charles Elliot and Qishan: 26 January 1841
  - Treaty of Nanking: 29 August 1842
  - Convention of Peking: 18 October 1860
  - Convention for the Extension of Hong Kong Territory: 9 June 1898
  - Japanese occupation of Hong Kong: 25 December 1941 – 30 August 1945
  - Handover of Hong Kong: 1 July 1997

Area
  - Total: 1,076 (Note: 949 km^{2} (366 sq mi) (New Territories) 80 km^{2} (31 sq mi) (Hong Kong Island) 47 km^{2} (18 sq mi) (Kowloon)) km^{2} (415 sq mi)

Population
  - 1996 estimate: 6,217,556
  - Density: 5,796/km^{2} (15,011.6/sq mi)
- GDP (PPP): 1996 estimate
  - Total: $154 billion
  - Per capita: $23,843
- GDP (nominal): 1996 estimate
  - Total: $160 billion
  - Per capita: $24,698
- Gini (1996): ▲51.8 high inequality
- HDI (1995): ▲0.808 very high
- Currency: Hong Kong dollar (from 1937); Trade dollar (1895–1937); Spanish dollar (until 1895); Chinese cash (until 1895)
- ISO 3166 code: HK
Preceded by	Succeeded by
1841: Xin'an County; 1945: Japanese Hong Kong	1941: Japanese Hong Kong; 1997: Hong Kong

Chinese name
- Traditional Chinese: 英屬香港
- Simplified Chinese: 英属香港
Transcriptions
Standard Mandarin
- Hanyu Pinyin: Yīngshǔ Xiānggǎng
- Bopomofo: ㄧㄥ ㄕㄨˇ ㄒㄧㄤ ㄍㄤˇ
- Wade–Giles: Ying^{1}-shu^{3} Hsiang^{1}-kang^{3}
- Tongyong Pinyin: Ying-shǔ Sianggǎng
- IPA: [íŋ.ʂù ɕjáŋ.kàŋ]
Yue: Cantonese
- Yale Romanization: Yīng suhk hēung góng
- Jyutping: jing1 suk6 hoeng1 gong2
- IPA: [jɪŋ˥ sʊk̚˨ hœŋ˥ kɔŋ˧˥]

Hong Kong was a Crown colony of the United Kingdom from 1841 to 1982, and a dependent territory from 1 January 1983 to 30 June 1997, except it was occupied by the Empire of Japan from 1941 to 1945 during the Second World War. The British rule began with the British occupation of Hong Kong Island under the Convention of Chuenpi in 1841 during the Victorian era, and ended with the handover of Hong Kong in July 1997.

In accordance with Article III of the Treaty of Nanking of 1842, signed in the aftermath of the First Opium War, the island of Hong Kong was ceded in perpetuity to Great Britain. It was established as a Crown colony in 1843. In 1860, the British expanded the colony with the addition of the Kowloon Peninsula and was further extended in 1898 when the British obtained a 99-year lease of the New Territories. Although the Qing had to cede Hong Kong Island and Kowloon in perpetuity as per the treaty, the leased New Territories comprised 86.2% of the colony and more than half of the entire colony's population. With the lease nearing its end during the late 20th century, Britain did not see any viable way to administer the colony by dividing it, whilst the People's Republic of China would not consider extending the lease or allowing continued British administration thereafter.

With the signing of the Sino-British Joint Declaration in 1984, which stated that the economic and social systems in Hong Kong would remain relatively unchanged for 50 years, the British government agreed to transfer the entire territory to China upon the expiration of the New Territories lease in 1997 – with Hong Kong becoming a special administrative region (SAR) until at least 2047.

== History ==
=== Colonial establishment ===
In 1836, the imperial government of the Qing dynasty undertook a major policy review of the opium trade, which had been first introduced to the Chinese by Persian then Islamic traders over many centuries. Viceroy Lin Zexu took on the task of suppressing the opium trade. In March 1839, he became Special Imperial Commissioner in Canton, where he ordered foreign traders to surrender their opium stock. He confined the British to the Canton Factories and cut off their supplies. Chief Superintendent of Trade, Charles Elliot, complied with Lin's demands in order to secure a safe exit for the British, with the costs involved to be resolved between the two governments. When Elliot promised that the British government would pay for their opium stock, the merchants surrendered their 20,283 chests of opium, which were destroyed in public.

In September 1839, the British Cabinet decided that the Chinese should be made to pay for the destruction of British property, either by the threat or use of force. An expeditionary force was placed under Elliot and his cousin, Rear-Admiral George Elliot, as joint plenipotentiaries in 1840. Foreign Secretary Lord Palmerston stressed to the Chinese government that the British government did not question China's right to prohibit opium, but it objected to the way this was handled. He viewed the sudden strict enforcement as laying a trap for the foreign traders, and the confinement of the British with supplies cut off was tantamount to starving them into submission or death. He instructed the Elliot cousins to occupy one of the Chusan Islands in the Hangzhou Bay delta across from Shanghai, then to present a letter from himself to a Chinese official for the Emperor of China, then to proceed to the Gulf of Bohai for a treaty, and if the Chinese resisted, then to blockade the key ports of the Yangtze and Yellow rivers. Palmerston demanded a territorial base in the Chusan Islands for trade so that British merchants "may not be subject to the arbitrary caprice either of the Government of Peking, or its local Authorities at the Sea-Ports of the Empire".

In 1841, Elliot negotiated with Lin's successor, Qishan, in the Convention of Chuenpi during the First Opium War. On 20 January, Elliot announced "the conclusion of preliminary arrangements", which included the cession of the barren Hong Kong Island and its harbour to the British Crown. Elliot chose Hong Kong Island instead of Chusan because he believed a settlement nearer to Shanghai would cause an "indefinite protraction of hostilities", whereas Hong Kong Island's harbour was a valuable base for the British trading community in Canton. British rule began with the occupation of the island on 26 January. Commodore Gordon Bremer, commander-in-chief of British forces in China, took formal possession of the island at Possession Point, where the Union Jack was raised under a fire of joy from the marines and a royal salute from the warships. Hong Kong Island was ceded in the Treaty of Nanking on 29 August 1842 and established as a Crown colony after the ratification exchanged between the Daoguang Emperor and Queen Victoria was completed on 26 June 1843.

By 1842, Hong Kong had become the major arms supply port in the Asia-Pacific region.

=== Growth and expansion ===
The Treaty of Nanking failed to satisfy British expectations of a major expansion of trade and profit, which led to increasing pressure for a revision of the terms. In October 1856, Chinese authorities in Canton detained the Arrow, a Chinese-owned ship registered in Hong Kong to enjoy the protection of the British flag. The Consul in Canton, Harry Parkes, claimed the hauling down of the flag and arrest of the crew were "an insult of very grave character". Parkes and Sir John Bowring, the fourth Governor of Hong Kong, seized on the incident to pursue a forward policy. In March 1857, Palmerston appointed Lord Elgin as Plenipotentiary, with the aim of securing a new and satisfactory treaty. A French expeditionary force joined the British to avenge the execution of a French missionary in 1856. In 1860, the capture of the Taku Forts and occupation of Beijing led to the Treaty of Tientsin and Convention of Peking. In the Treaty of Tientsin, the Chinese accepted British demands to open more ports, navigate the Yangtze River, legalise the opium trade and have diplomatic representation in Beijing. During the conflict, the British occupied the Kowloon Peninsula, where the flat land was valuable training and resting ground. The area in what is now south of Boundary Street and Stonecutters Island was ceded in the Convention of Peking.

In 1898, the British sought to extend Hong Kong for defence. After negotiations began in April 1898, with the British Minister in Beijing, Sir Claude MacDonald, representing Britain, and diplomat Li Hongzhang leading the Chinese, the Second Convention of Peking was signed on 9 June. Since the foreign powers had agreed by the late 19th century that it was no longer permissible to acquire outright sovereignty over any parcel of Chinese territory, and in keeping with the other territorial cessions China made to Russia, Germany and France that same year, the extension of Hong Kong took the form of a 99-year lease. The lease consisted of the rest of Kowloon south of the Sham Chun River and 230 islands, which became known as the New Territories. The British formally took possession on 16 April 1899.

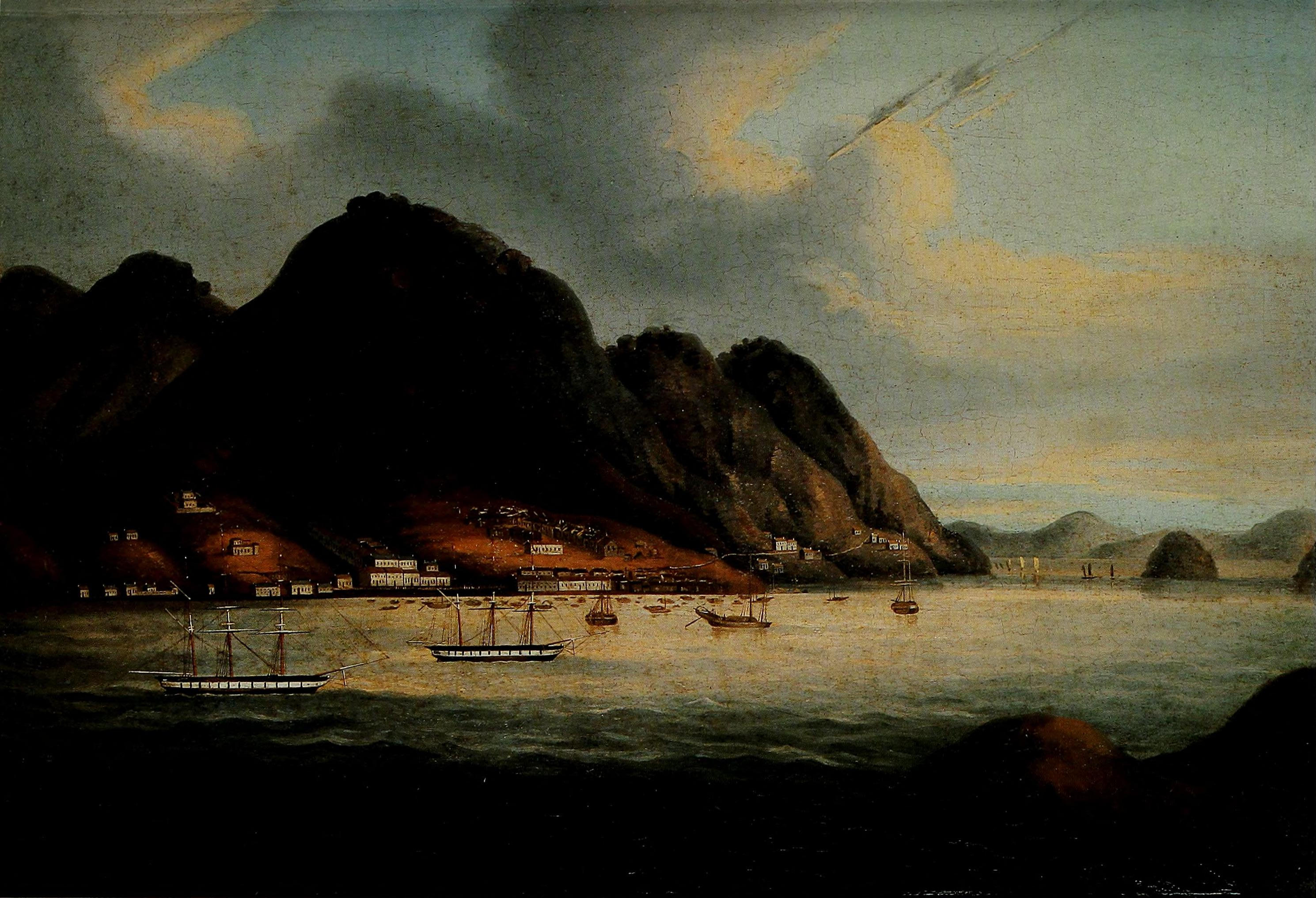
Possibly the earliest painting of Hong Kong Island, showing the waterfront settlement which became Victoria City

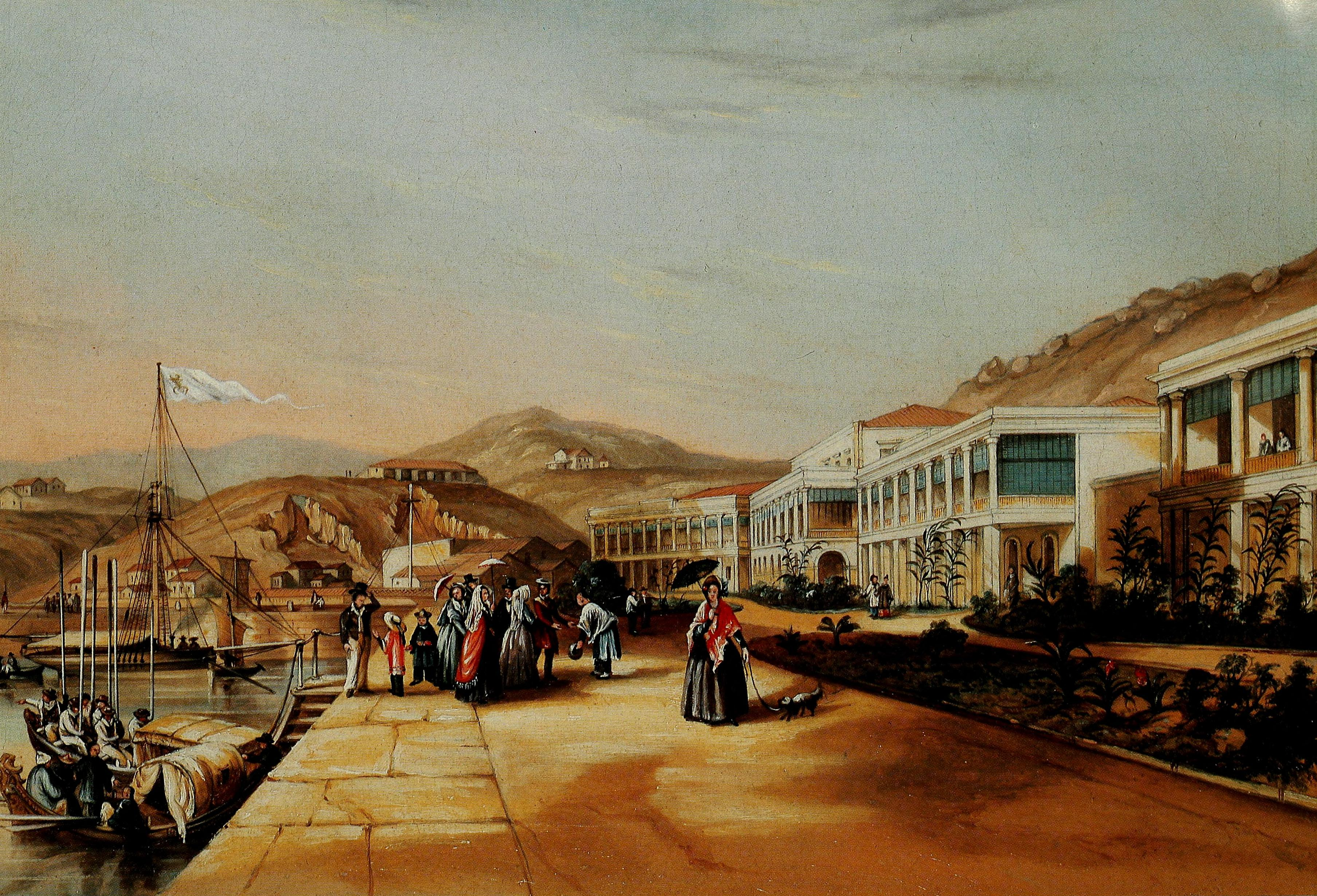
Spring Garden Lane, 1846

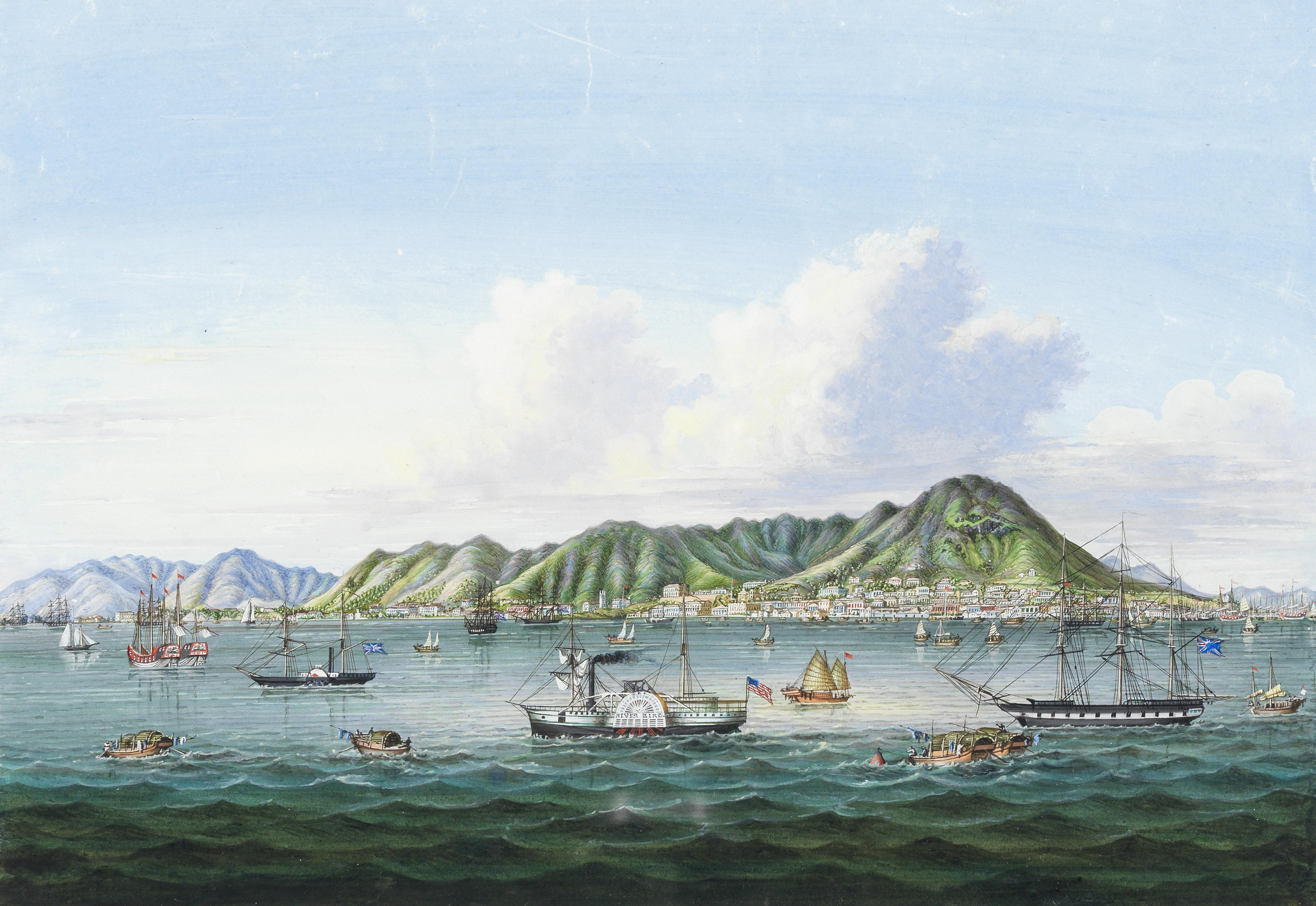
View of Hong Kong, 1855

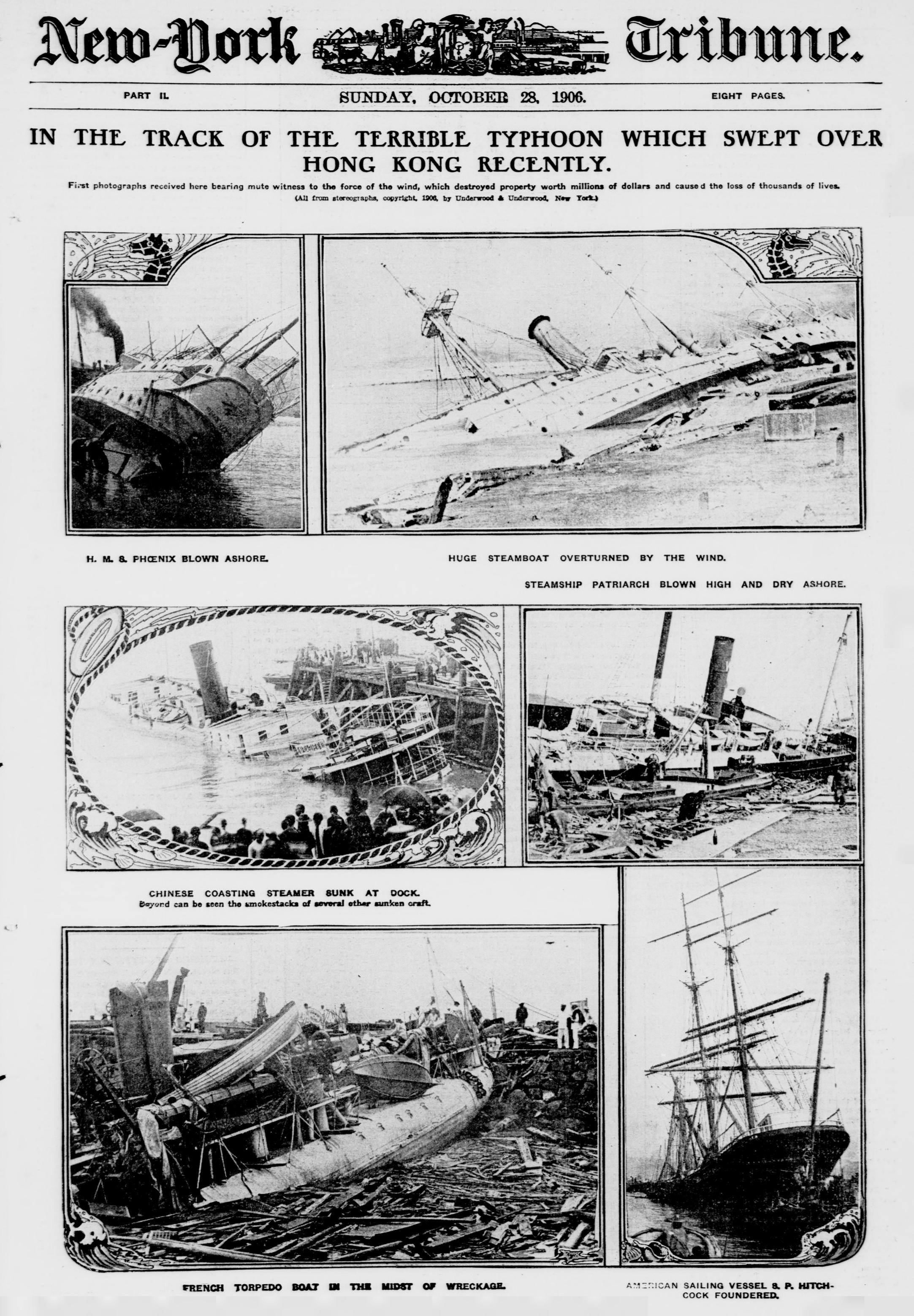
New York Tribune front page, giving details on 1906 Hong Kong typhoon

=== Japanese occupation ===
Hong Kong, 1937

In 1941, during the Second World War, the British reached an agreement with the Chinese government under Generalissimo Chiang Kai-shek that if Japan attacked Hong Kong, the Chinese National Army would attack the Japanese from the rear to relieve pressure on the British garrison. On 8 December, the Battle of Hong Kong began when Japanese air bombers effectively destroyed British air power in one attack. Two days later, the Japanese breached the Gin Drinkers Line in the New Territories. The British commander, Major-General Christopher Maltby, concluded that the island could not be defended for long unless he withdrew his brigade from the mainland. On 18 December, the Japanese crossed Victoria Harbour. By 25 December, organised defence was reduced into pockets of resistance. Maltby recommended a course of negotiated surrender to Governor Sir Mark Young, who accepted his advice to reduce further losses. A day after the invasion, Chiang ordered three corps under General Yu Hanmou to march towards Hong Kong. The plan was to launch a New Year's Day attack on the Japanese in the Canton region, but before the Chinese infantry could attack, the Japanese had broken Hong Kong's defences. The British casualties were 2,232 killed or missing and 2,300 wounded. The Japanese reported 1,996 killed and 6,000 wounded.

The Japanese soldiers committed atrocities, including rape, on many locals. Refuge flight caused the population to fall in half, from 1.6 million in 1941 to 750,000 at war's end; many returned in 1945.

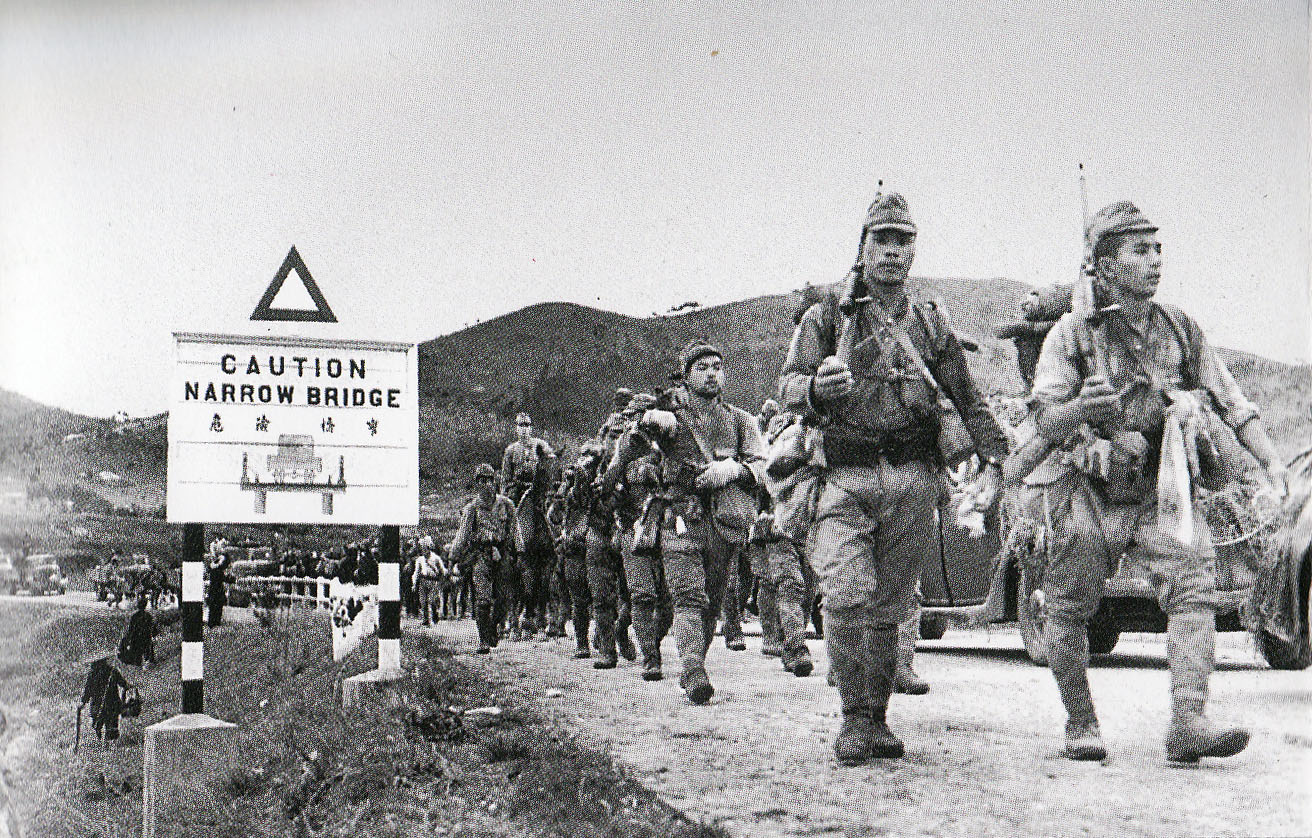
Japanese troops crossing the border from the mainland, 1941

The Japanese imprisoned the ruling British colonial elite and sought to win over the local merchant gentry by appointments to advisory councils and neighbourhood watch groups. The policy worked well for Japan and produced extensive collaboration from both the elite and the middle class, with far less terror than in other Chinese cities. Hong Kong was transformed into a Japanese colony, with Japanese businesses replacing the British. However, the Japanese Empire had severe logistical difficulties and by 1943 the food supply for Hong Kong was problematic. The overlords became more brutal and corrupt, and the Chinese gentry became disenchanted. With the surrender of Japan, the transition back to British rule was smooth, for on the mainland the Nationalist and Communist forces were preparing for a civil war and ignored Hong Kong. In the long run the occupation strengthened the pre-war social and economic order among the Chinese business community by eliminating some conflicts of interests and reducing the prestige and power of the British.

=== Restoration of British rule ===
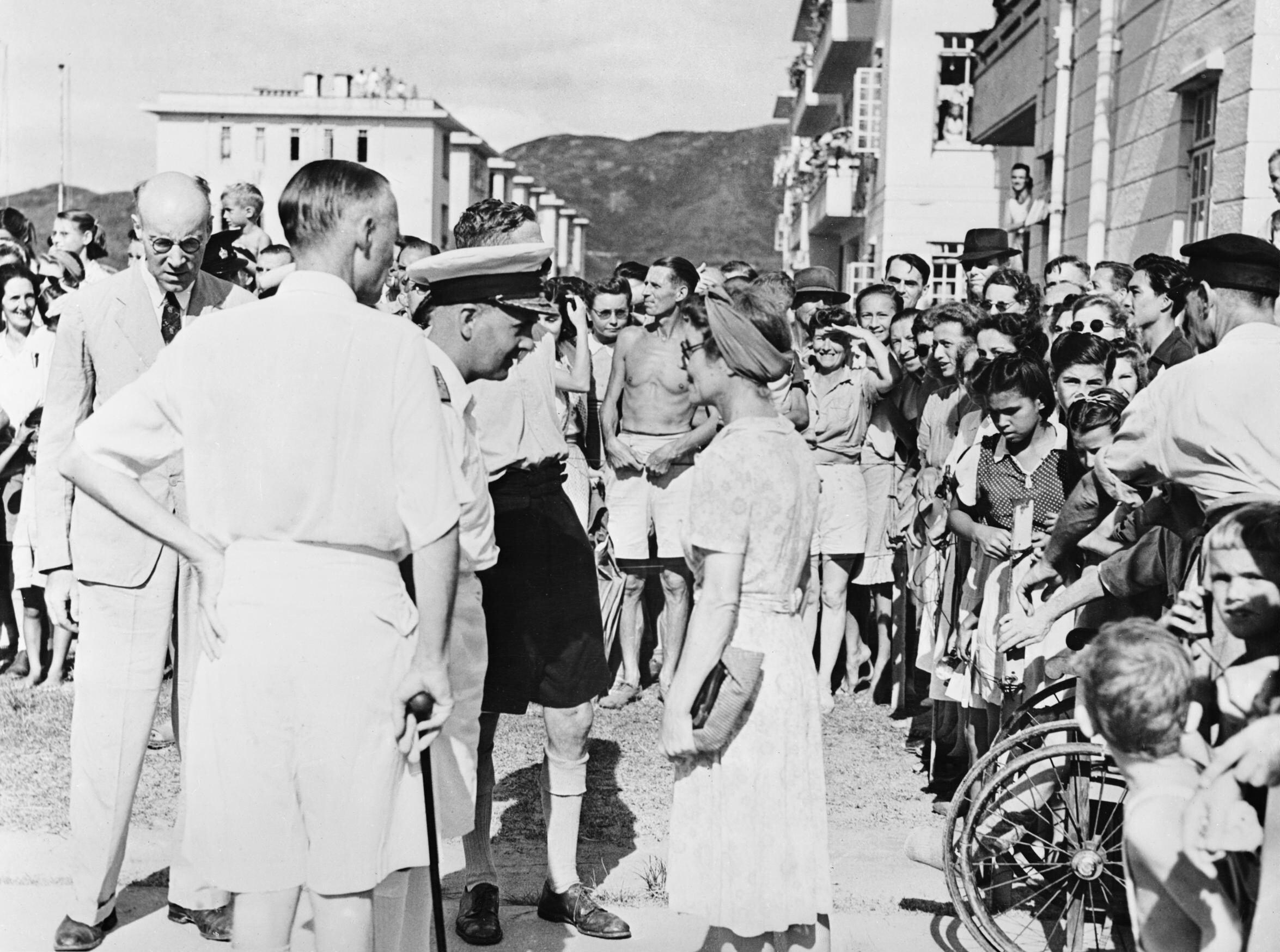
British forces reoccupy Hong Kong under Rear-Admiral Cecil Harcourt, 30 August 1945

On 14 August 1945, when Japan announced its unconditional surrender, the British formed a naval task group to sail towards Hong Kong. On 1 September, Rear-Admiral Cecil Harcourt proclaimed a military administration with himself as its head. He formally accepted the Japanese surrender on 16 September in Government House. Young, upon his return as governor in May 1946, pursued political reform known as the "Young Plan", believing that, to counter the Chinese government's determination to recover Hong Kong, it was necessary to give local inhabitants a greater stake in the territory by widening the political franchise to include them. Hong Kong remained a part of the UK and overseas colonies from 1949 until it transitioned its colony to a British dependent territory in 1983.

The economy was the main concern for the British administration after the Chinese Civil War. Hong Kong welcomed businesses from both the PRC and Republic of China. Investments from Taiwan were particularly lucrative, and Taiwanese interests were given preferential treatment in state compensation and justice. The Triads were strongly embedded in Taiwanese economic connections. Political activity, covert activity, and low intensity violence including assassinations by both PRC and ROC agents was tolerated so long as it did not disrupt public order or threaten British sovereignty. Hong Kong served as a base for American-sponsored ROC and anti-communist insurgents operating in southern China in the 1950s and early 1960s. The British claimed that increasing policing to control movement from Hong Kong to China was impractical, and that the mutual open border policy was responsible. Hong Kong's value as a conduit for international trade shielded it from most PRC pressure during the 1950s.

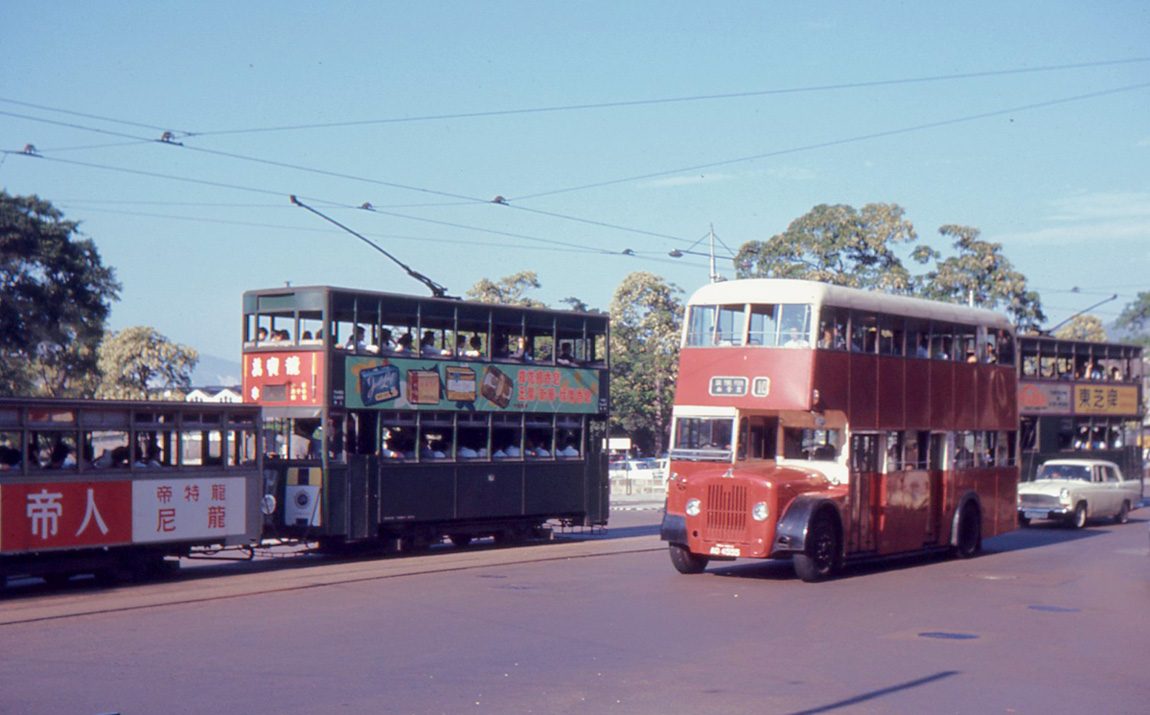
A double-decker bus and two double-decker trams in Queen's Road Central, 1967

Throughout the Cold War, Hong Kong received a large influx of Chinese Kuomintang refugees, fleeing the Chinese Civil War and communist persecution. They became part of the "Rightist" pro-ROC camp and competed with the Pro-PRC camp, also known as the "Leftists" for political power and influence. Many of the Rightist refugees served as cheap labour that would greatly contribute to Hong Kong's dramatic economic growth. Some of the refugees were recruited in Hong Kong as anti-communist militants. The 1956 Hong Kong riots started when housing authorities at the Lei Cheng Uk Resettlement Area ordered the removal of several Republic of China and Kuomintang flags from a housing block to the strong objection of the residents, which escalated into a riot when Leftist protesters and Rightist protesters clashed in the streets. The response to the riots favoured the Rightists; Rightist rioters were lightly prosecuted, compensation was denied to communists and bystanders, and the communists were officially blamed as instigators. The lax persecution of the riots Rightists instigators was used by the PRC to criticize the "airy use of the rule of law as a pragmatic stand-in for human rights" that characterized British colonialism.

In 1963, Hong Kong suppressed cells of ROC militants in response to demands from the PRC; the PRC provided a list of ROC agents. By this time, Britain no longer considered a ROC reconquest of mainland China to be realistic; the evolving discourse on human rights also made it difficult to legitimize being a sponsor of state terrorism.

=== Transfer of sovereignty ===
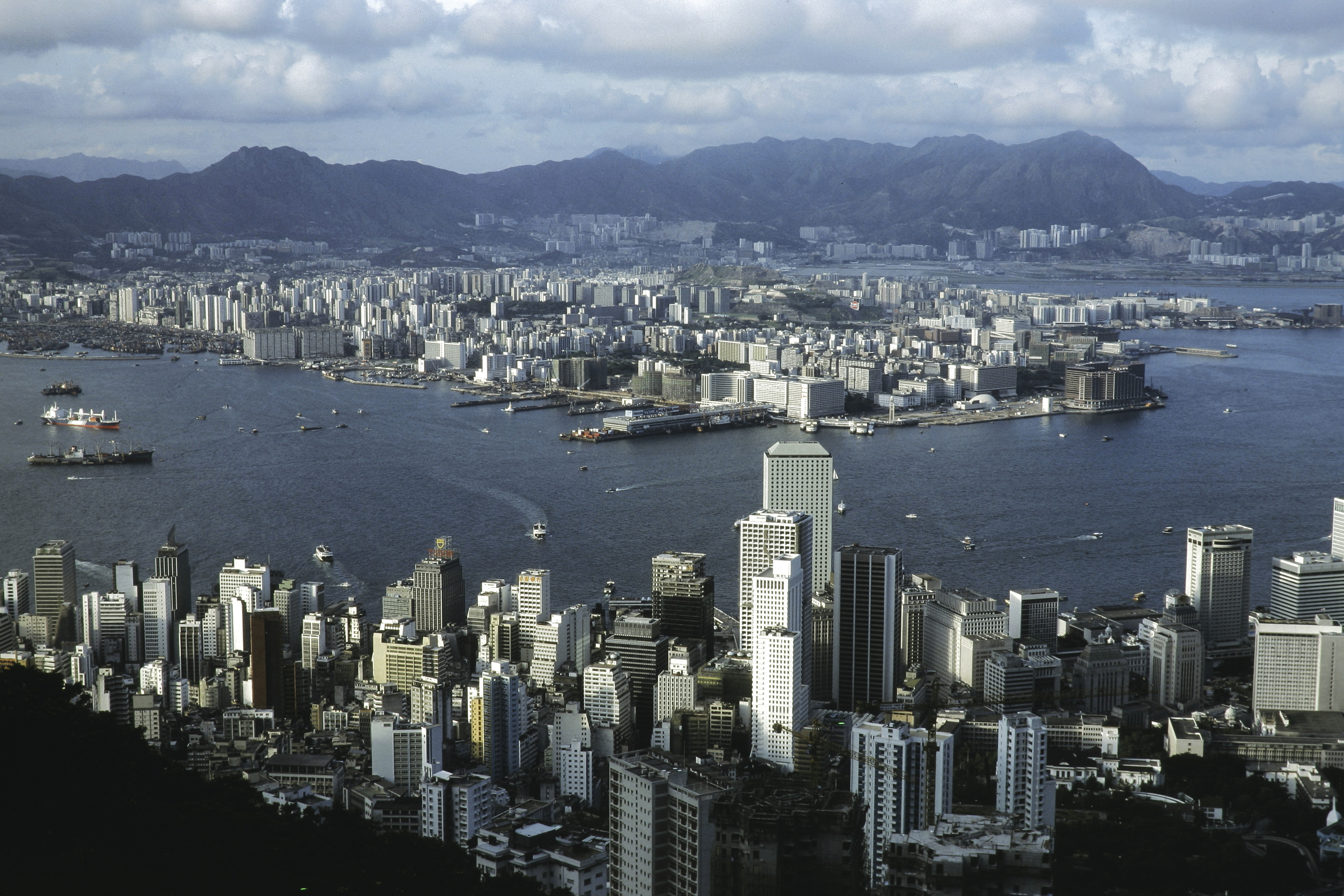
Urban Hong Kong in 1980

The Sino-British Joint Declaration was signed by both the Prime Minister of the United Kingdom and the Premier of China on 19 December 1984 in Beijing. The Declaration entered into force with the exchange of instruments of ratification on 27 May 1985 and was registered by the People's Republic of China and United Kingdom governments at the United Nations on 12 June 1985. In the Joint Declaration, the People's Republic of China Government stated that it had decided to resume the exercise of sovereignty over Hong Kong (including Hong Kong Island, Kowloon, and the New Territories) with effect from 1 July 1997 and the United Kingdom Government declared that it would relinquish Hong Kong to the PRC with effect from 1 July 1997. In the document, the People's Republic of China Government also declared its basic policies regarding Hong Kong.

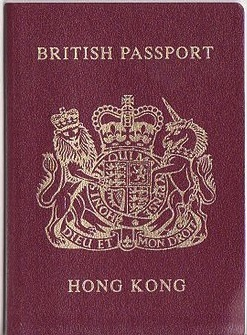
British Hong Kong passport

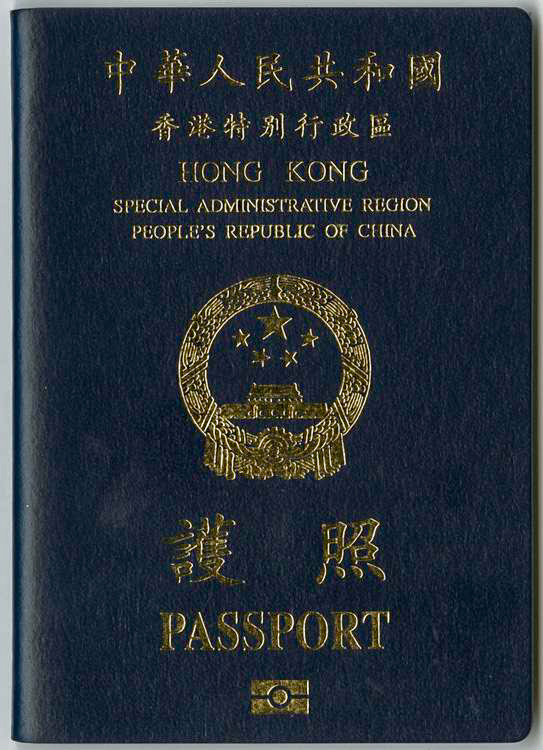
Hong Kong SAR passport

In accordance with the One Country, two Systems principle agreed between the United Kingdom and the People's Republic of China, the socialist system of People's Republic of China would not be practised in the Hong Kong Special Administrative Region (HKSAR), and Hong Kong's previous capitalist system and its way of life would remain unchanged for a period of 50 years. The Joint Declaration provides that these basic policies shall be stipulated in the Hong Kong Basic Law. The ceremony of the signing of the Sino-British Joint Declaration took place at 18:00, 19 December 1984 at the Western Main Chamber of the Great Hall of the People. The Hong Kong and Macau Affairs Office at first proposed a list of 60–80 Hong Kong people to attend the ceremony. The number was finally extended to 101. The list included Hong Kong government officials, members of the Legislative and Executive Councils, chairmen of the HSBC (Hong Kong) and Standard Charter Hong Kong, Hong Kong celebrities such as Li Ka-shing, Yue-Kong Pao, Henry Fok, Martin Lee, and Szeto Wah.

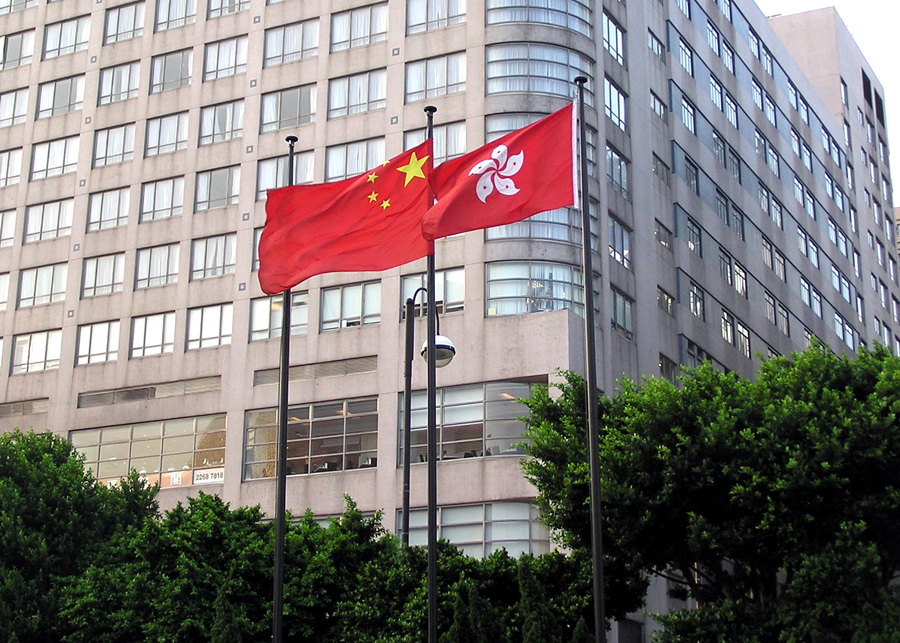
The flag of Hong Kong SAR next to the flag of People's Republic of China

The handover ceremony was held at the new wing of the Hong Kong Convention and Exhibition Centre in Wan Chai on the night of 30 June 1997. The principal British guest was Charles, Prince of Wales (now Charles III, King of the United Kingdom) who read a farewell speech on behalf of his mother, Queen Elizabeth II. The newly elected Prime Minister of the United Kingdom, Tony Blair; the Foreign Secretary, Robin Cook; the departing Governor of Hong Kong, Chris Patten; the Chief of the Defence Staff of the United Kingdom, Field Marshal Sir Charles Guthrie, also attended.

Representing the People’s Republic of China were the General Secretary of the CCP and President of China, Jiang Zemin; Premier of China Li Peng; and Tung Chee-hwa, the first Chief Executive of Hong Kong. This event was broadcast on television and radio stations across the world.

== Government ==
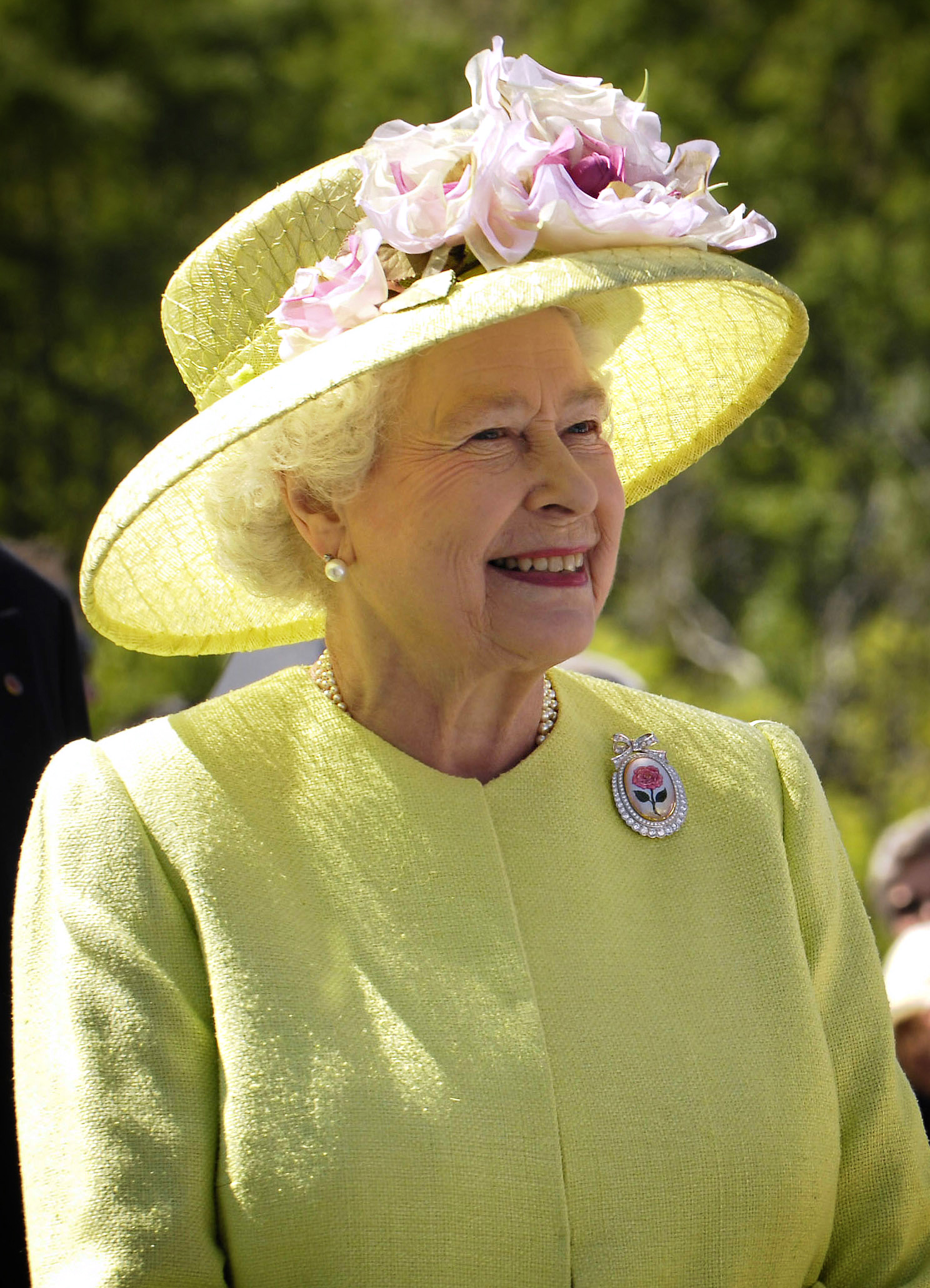
Elizabeth II
Monarch
(1952–1997)

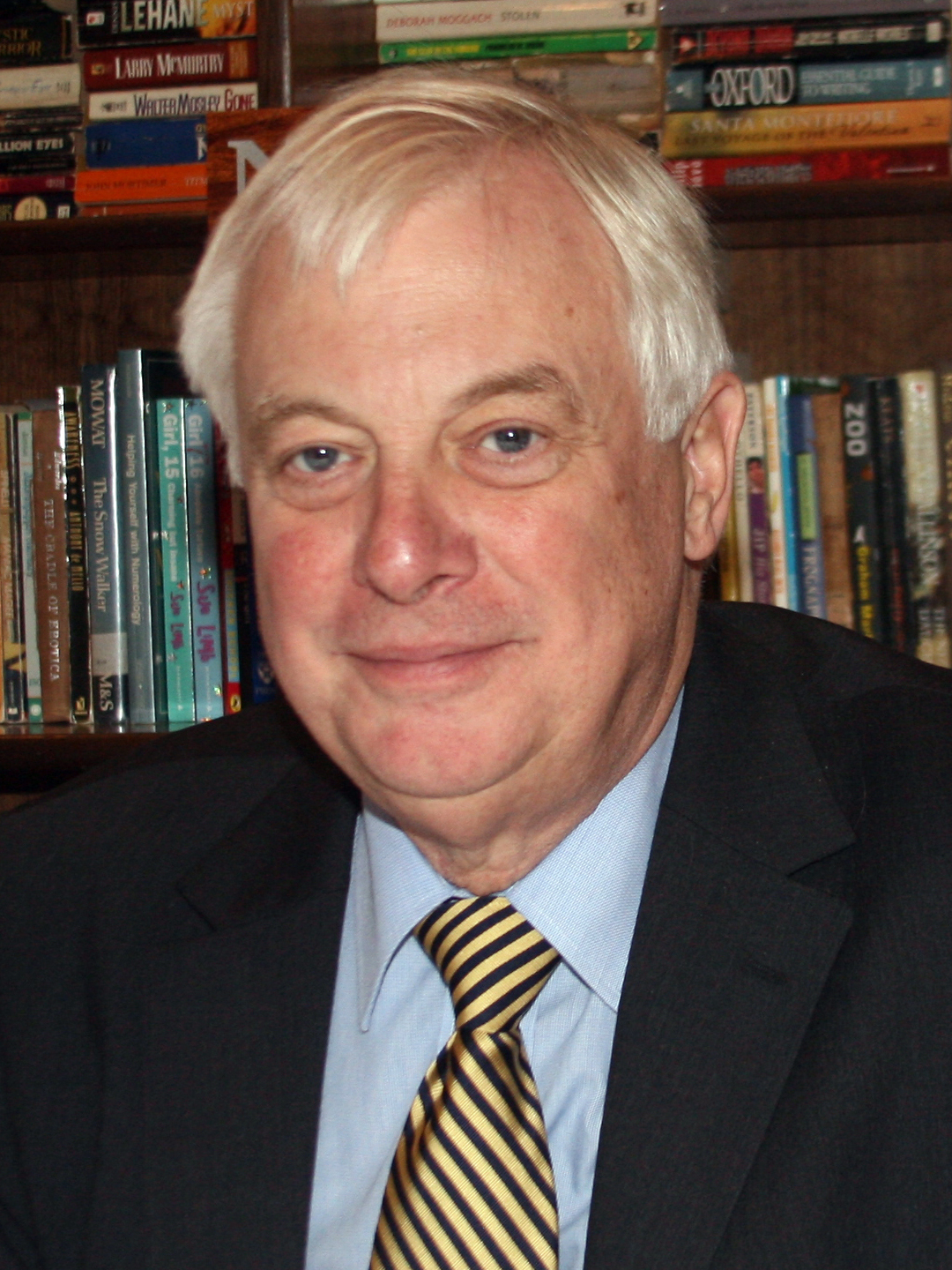
Chris Patten
Governor
(1992–1997)

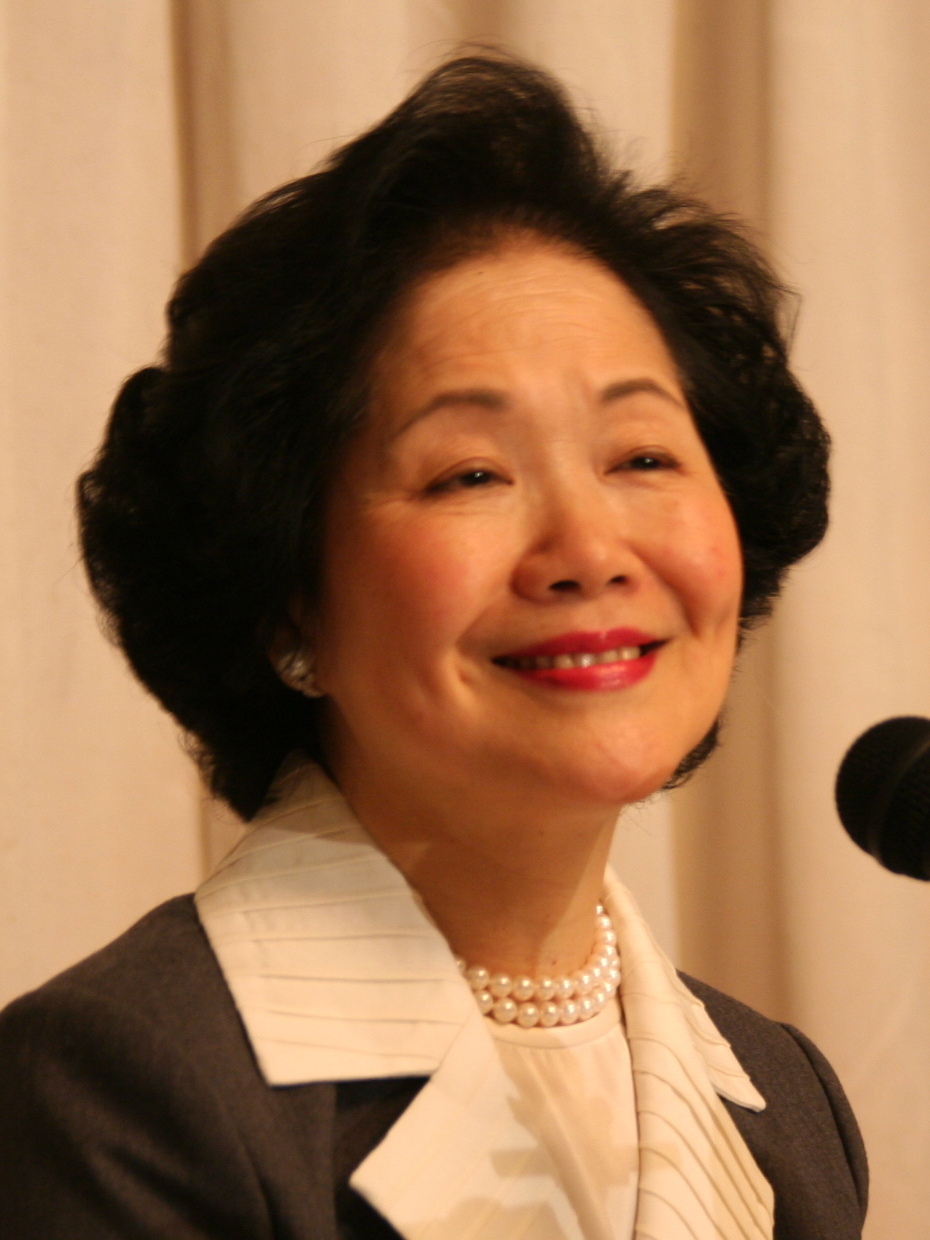
Anson Chan
Chief Secretary
(1993–1997)

Hong Kong was a dependent territory of the United Kingdom and maintained an administration roughly modelled after the Westminster system. The Hong Kong Letters Patent 1917 formed the constitutional basis of the colonial government and the Hong Kong Royal Instructions 1917 detailed how the territory should be governed and organised.

The Governor of Hong Kong was the head of government and appointed by the British monarch to serve as the representative of the Crown in the colony. Executive power was highly concentrated with the Governor, who himself appointed almost all members of the Legislative Council and Executive Council and also served as President of both chambers. The British government provided oversight for the colonial government; the Foreign Secretary formally approved any additions to the Legislative and Executive Councils and the Sovereign held sole authority to amend the Letters Patent and Royal Instructions.

The Executive Council determined administrative policy changes and considered primary legislation before passing it to the Legislative Council for approval. This advisory body also itself issued secondary legislation under a limited set of colonial ordinances. The Legislative Council debated proposed legislation and was responsible for the appropriation of public funds. This chamber was reformed in the last years of colonial rule to introduce more democratic representation. Indirectly elected functional constituency seats were introduced in 1985 and popularly elected geographical constituency seats in 1991. Further electoral reform in 1994 effectively made the legislature broadly representative. The administrative Civil Service was led by the Colonial Secretary (later Chief Secretary), who was deputy to the Governor.

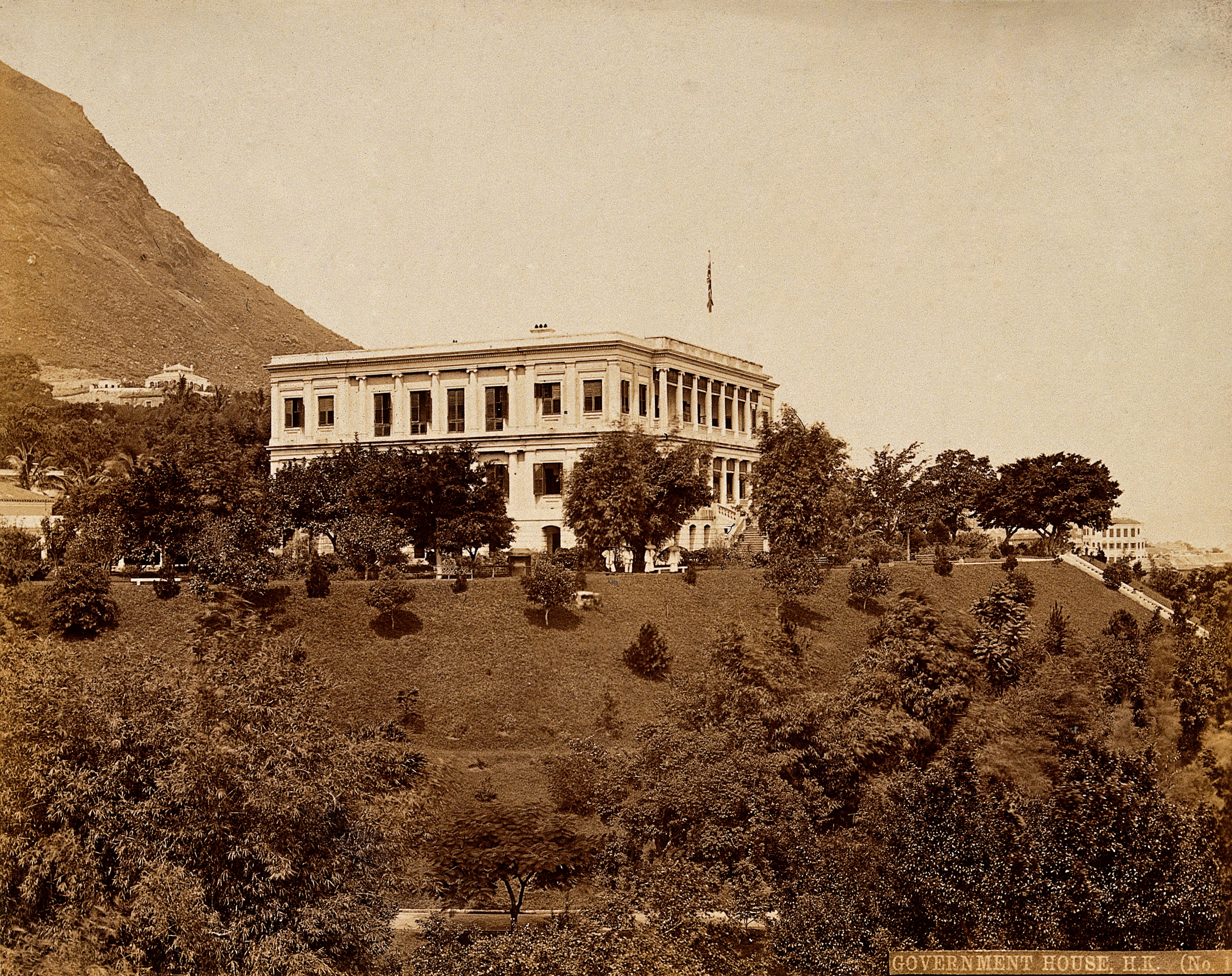
Government House, c. 1873

The judicial system was based on English law, with Chinese customary law taking a secondary role in civil cases involving Chinese residents. The Supreme Court of Hong Kong was the highest court and ruled on all civil and criminal cases in the colony. During the early colonial period, extraterritorial appellate cases from other regions of China involving British subjects were also tried in this court. Further appeals from the Supreme Court were heard by the Judicial Committee of the Privy Council, which exercised final adjudication over the entire British Empire.

In March 1975 the Hong Kong government introduced a programme to measure public opinion of government efforts, known as Movement of Opinion Direction (MOOD).

=== Cadets ===
In 1861, Governor Sir Hercules Robinson introduced the Hong Kong Cadetship, which recruited young graduates from Britain to learn Cantonese and written Chinese for two years, before deploying them on a fast track to the Civil Service. Cadet officers gradually formed the backbone of the civil administration. After the Second World War, ethnic Chinese were allowed into the service, followed by women. Cadets were renamed Administrative Officers in the 1950s, and they remained the elite of the Civil Service during British rule.

=== Military ===
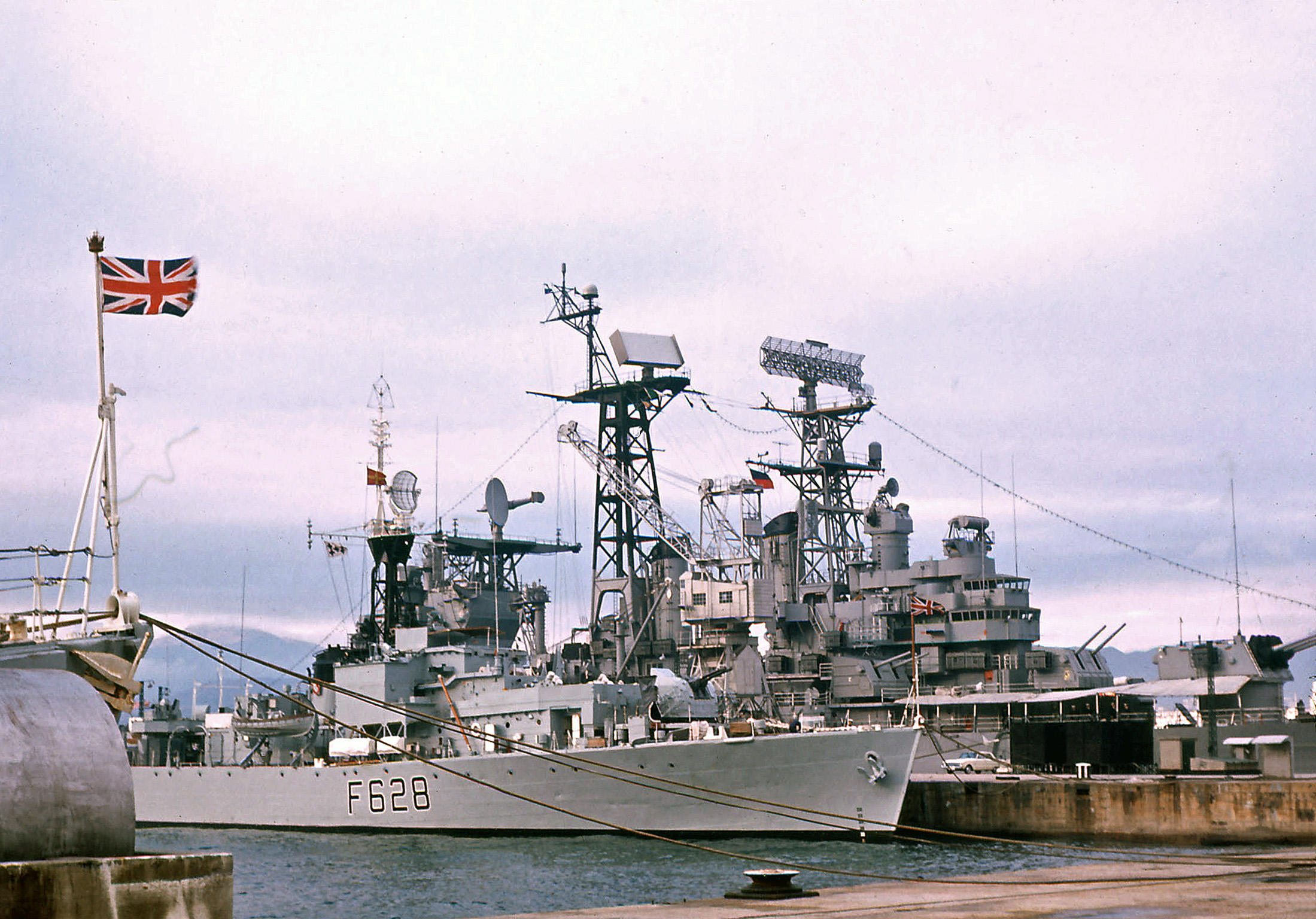
The Royal Navy frigate HMS Loch Killisport at Hong Kong, 1964

Prior to and during the Second World War, the garrison was composed of British Army battalions and locally enlisted personnel (LEPs) who served as regular members in the Hong Kong Squadron of the Royal Navy or the Hong Kong Military Service Corps and their associate land units. The Hong Kong Brigade served as the main garrison formation. After the outbreak of the Second World War, the garrison was reinforced with British Indian Army and Canadian Army units. A second brigade, the Kowloon Infantry Brigade, was formed to assist in commanding the expanded force. The garrison was defeated during the Battle of Hong Kong, by the Empire of Japan.

After the Second World War and the end of the Japanese occupation of Hong Kong, the British military reestablished a presence. As a result of the Chinese Civil War, the British Army raised the 40th Infantry Division and dispatched it to garrison Hong Kong. It later left for combat in the Korean War, and the defence of the territory was taken up by additional British forces who were rotated from Europe. The garrison was further supplemented by LEPs, and Gurkhas. The latter came from Nepal, but formed part of the British Army. The size of the garrison during the Cold War fluctuated and ended up being based around one brigade.

The Royal Hong Kong Regiment, a military unit which was part of the Hong Kong Government, was trained and organised along the lines of a British Territorial Army unit. As such, it was supported by British Army regular personnel holding key positions. These British Army personnel, for their duration of service to the Royal Hong Kong Regiment, were seconded to the Hong Kong Government. In the post-WWII era, the majority of the regiment's members were local citizens of Chinese descent.

== Economy ==
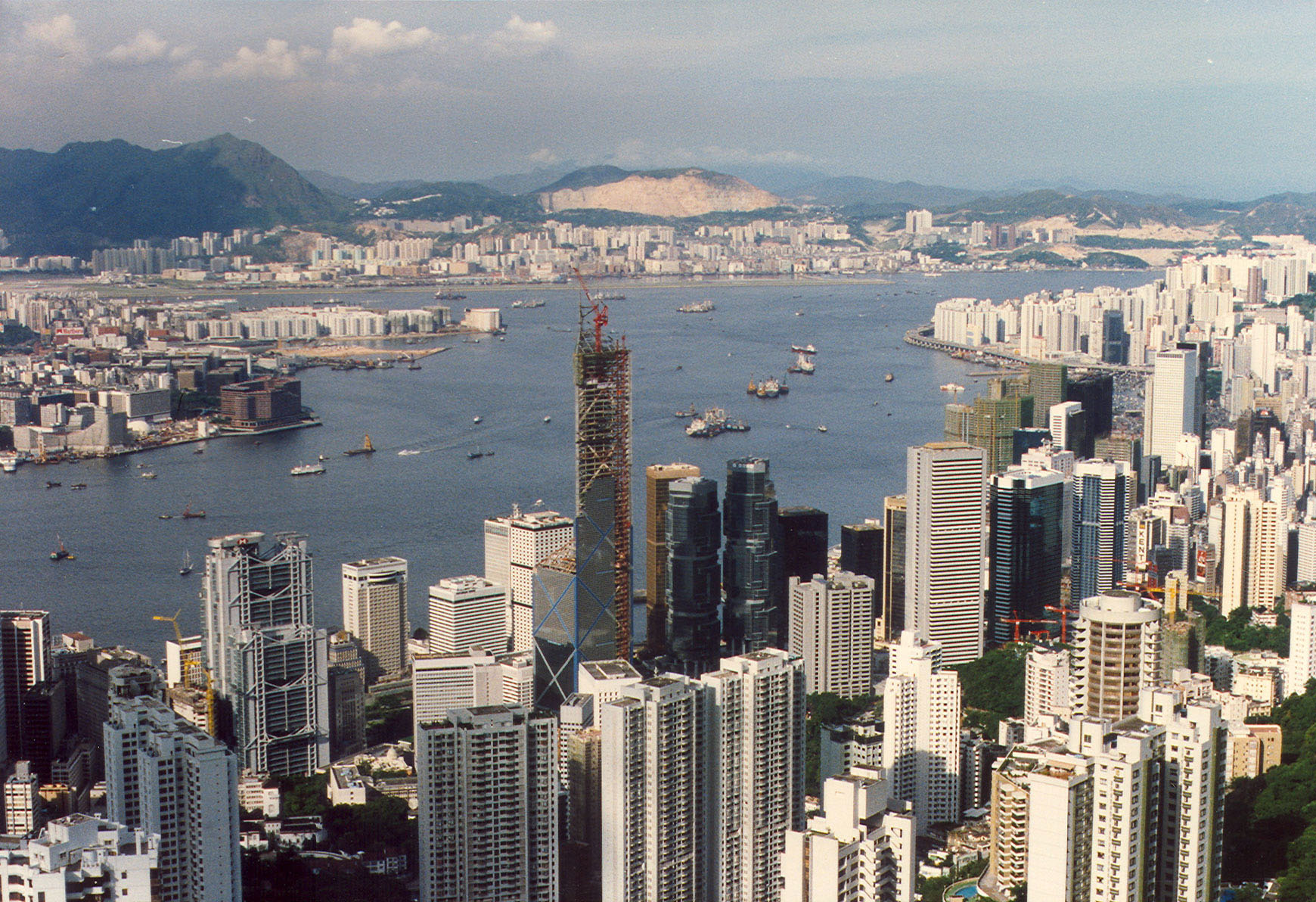
Victoria Harbour in 1988, showing the Bank of China Tower being built

The economy of Hong Kong under British rule was based on free trade and positive non-interventionism, with the minimal red tape and low taxes allowing the colony to flourish primarily as a free-trade zone and later as an offshore financial centre. The stability, security, and predictability of British law and government enabled Hong Kong to flourish as a centre for international trade. In the colony's first decade, revenue from the opium trade was a key source of government funds. The importance of opium reduced over time, but the colonial government was dependent on its revenues until the Japanese occupation in 1941. Although the largest businesses in the early colony were operated by British, American, and other expatriates, Chinese workers provided the bulk of the manpower needed to build a new port city.

By the late 1980s, many ethnic Chinese people had become major business figures in Hong Kong. Amongst these billionaires was Sir Li Ka-shing, who had become one of the colony's wealthiest people by this time.

== Culture ==
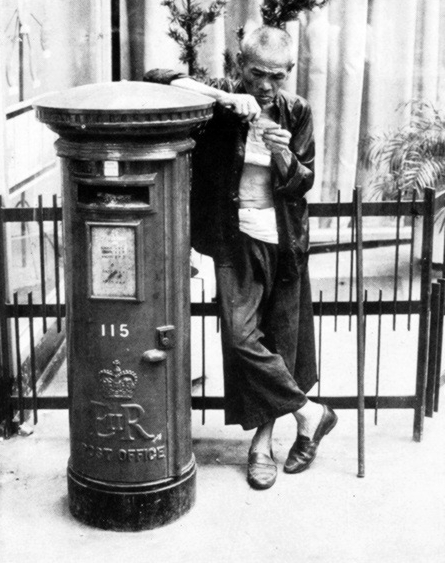
A man leaning on a Royal Mail post box in Hong Kong, 1962

British Hong Kong was characterised as a hybrid of East and West. Traditional Chinese values emphasising family and education blended with Western ideals, including economic liberty and the rule of law. Although the vast majority of the population was ethnically Chinese, Hong Kong developed a distinct identity from the mainland through its long period of colonial administration and a different pace of economic, social, and cultural development, with mainstream culture was derived from immigrants originating from various parts of China. This was influenced by British-style education, a separate political system, and the territory's rapid development during the late 20th century. Most migrants of that era fled poverty and war, reflected in the prevailing attitude toward wealth; Hongkongers tended to link self-image and decision-making to material benefits. Residents' sense of local identity remained post-handover, with, in 2018, the majority of the population (52%) identifying as "Hongkongers", while 11% described themselves as "Chinese". The remaining population held mixed identities, 23% as "Hongkonger in China" and 12% as "Chinese in Hong Kong".

Traditional Chinese family values, including family honour, filial piety, and a preference for sons, remained prevalent. Nuclear families were the most common households, although multi-generational and extended families were not unusual. In British-ruled Hong Kong, polygamy was legal until 1971 pursuant to the colonial practice of not interfering in local customs that British authorities viewed as relatively harmless to the public order.

Spiritual concepts such as feng shui were observed; large-scale construction projects often hired consultants to ensure proper building positioning and layout. The degree of its adherence to feng shui was believed to determine the success of a business. Bagua mirrors were regularly used to deflect evil spirits, and buildings often lack floor numbers with a 4; the number has a similar sound to the word for "die" in Cantonese.

=== Language ===
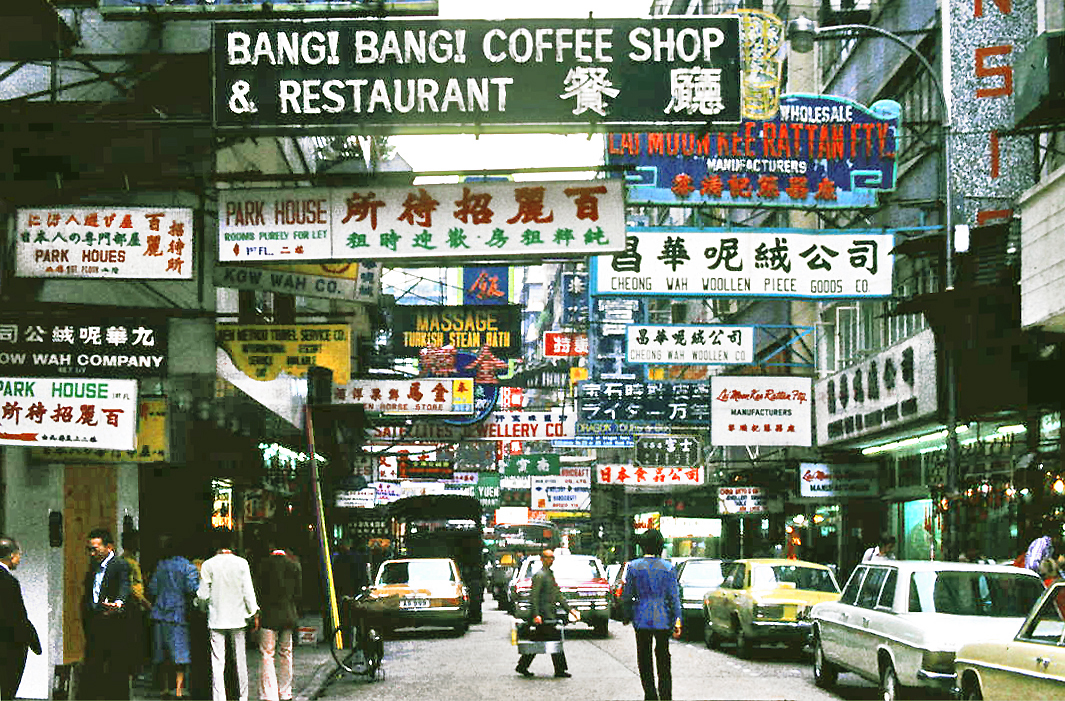
Shopping street at Kowloon with signs in English and Traditional Chinese, 1978

A prominent example of cultural integration in everyday life in British Hong Kong, was the use of British English as a common second language, and also the sole official language of the colony until 1974, when Chinese was accorded co-official status. In addition to British English being taught in primary and secondary schools, there were also English-medium schools operated by the English Schools Foundation, established in 1967. For the metro system, the metro lines were named after places instead of numbered, unlike Mainland China, where metro lines were numbered. Roads were named after British royals, governors, famous people, cities and towns across the UK and the Commonwealth, as well as Chinese cities and places. Aside from Chinese New Year, Christmas was celebrated as the second-most important festival. In literature, some idioms in Cantonese were directly translated from those in English. A Mandarin Chinese speaker might recognise the words but not understand the meaning.

=== Cuisine ===
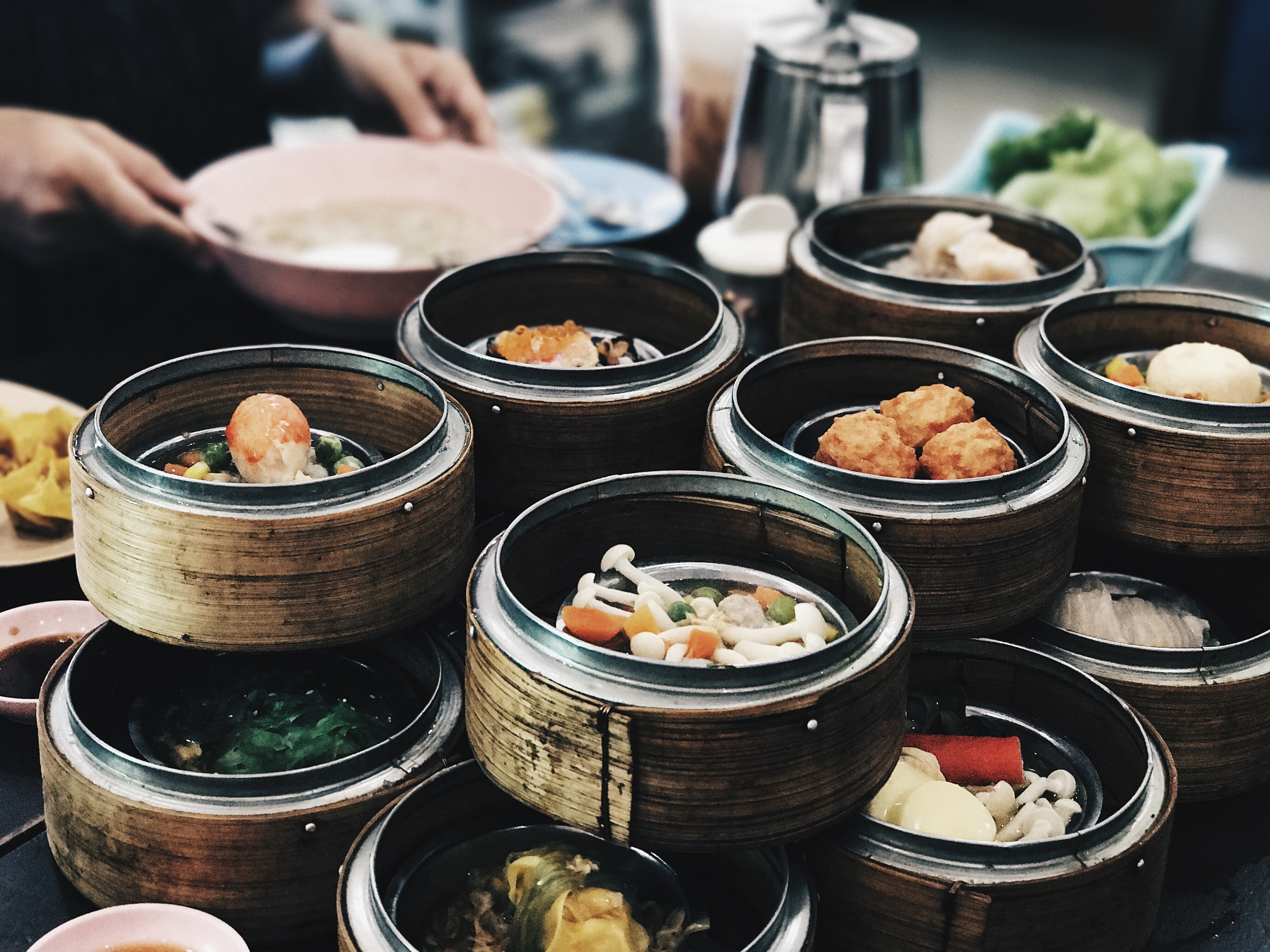
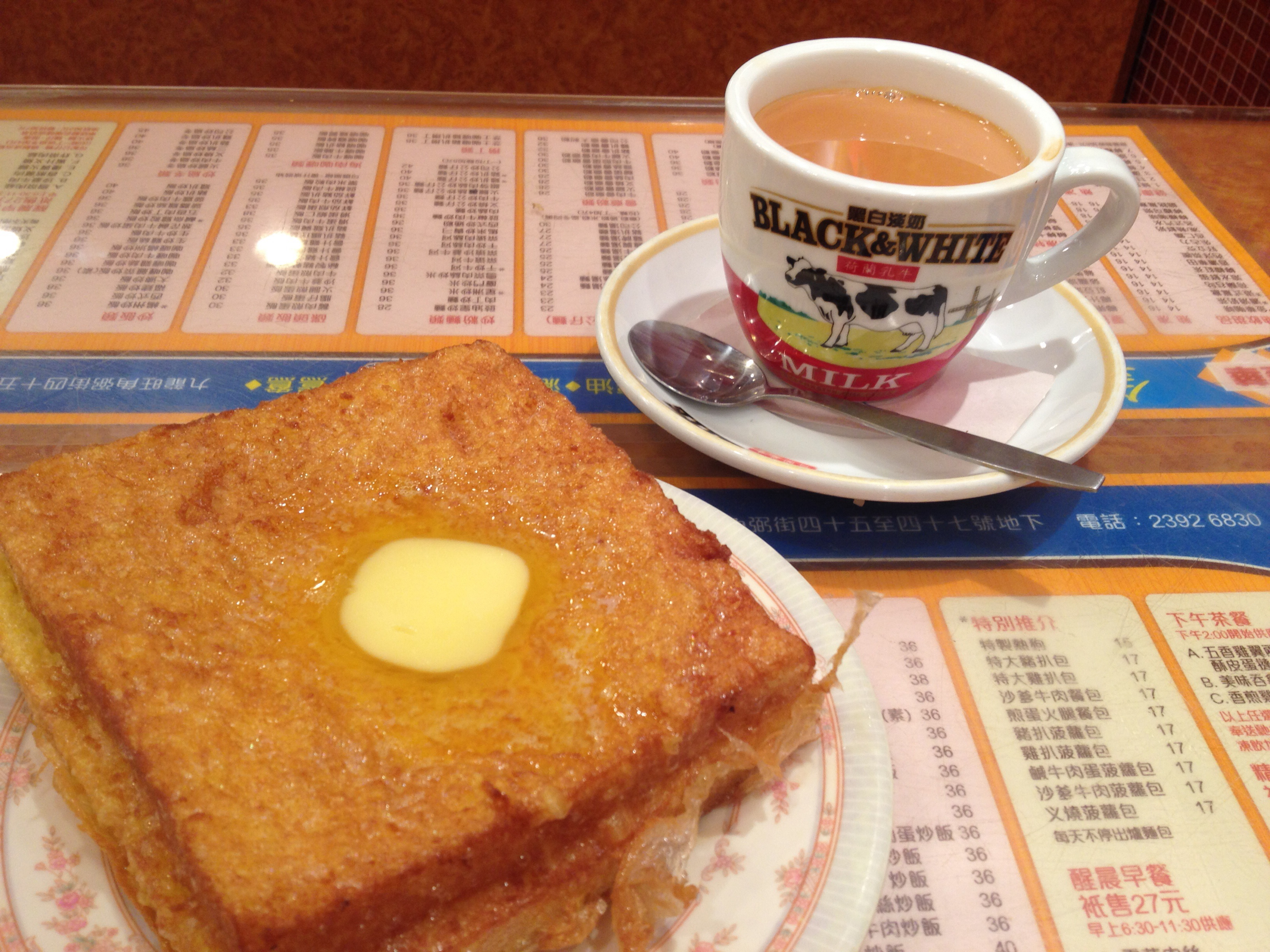
(left) Typical fare at a dim sum restaurant; (right) cha chaan teng breakfast food with Hong Kong-style milk tea

Food in Hong Kong under British rule was primarily based on Cantonese cuisine, despite the territory's exposure to foreign influences and its residents' varied origins. Rice was the staple food, and was usually served plain with other dishes. Freshness of ingredients was emphasised. Poultry and seafood were commonly sold live at wet markets, and ingredients were used as quickly as possible. There were five daily meals: breakfast, lunch, afternoon tea, dinner, and siu yeh. Dim sum, as part of yum cha (brunch), was a dining-out tradition with family and friends. Dishes include congee, cha siu bao, siu yuk, egg tarts, and mango pudding. Local versions of Western food were served at cha chaan teng (Hong Kong-style cafes). Common cha chaan teng menu items include macaroni in soup, deep-fried French toast, and Hong Kong-style milk tea.

=== Cinema ===
Film making in Hong Kong began as early as 1909, but Hong Kong was not a film making hub until the late 1940s, when a wave of Shanghai filmmakers migrated to the territory; these movie veterans helped build the colony's entertainment industry over the next decade. By the 1960s, the city was well known to overseas audiences through films such as The World of Suzie Wong. When Bruce Lee's The Way of the Dragon was released in 1972, local productions became popular outside Hong Kong. During the 1980s, films such as A Better Tomorrow, As Tears Go By, and Zu Warriors from the Magic Mountain expanded global interest beyond martial arts films; locally made gangster films, romantic dramas, and supernatural fantasies became popular. Hong Kong cinema continued to be internationally successful over the following decade with critically acclaimed dramas such as Farewell My Concubine, To Live and Wong Kar Wai movies. The city's martial arts film roots were evident in the roles of the most prolific Hong Kong actors. Jackie Chan, Donnie Yen, Jet Li, Chow Yun-fat, and Michelle Yeoh frequently play action-oriented roles in foreign films. At the height of the local movie industry in the early 1990s, over 400 films were produced each year; since then, industry momentum has shifted to mainland China. The number of films produced annually declined to about 60 in 2017.

=== Music ===
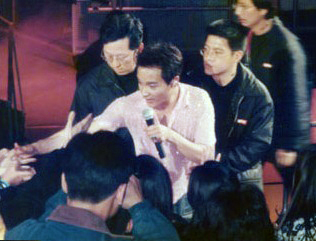
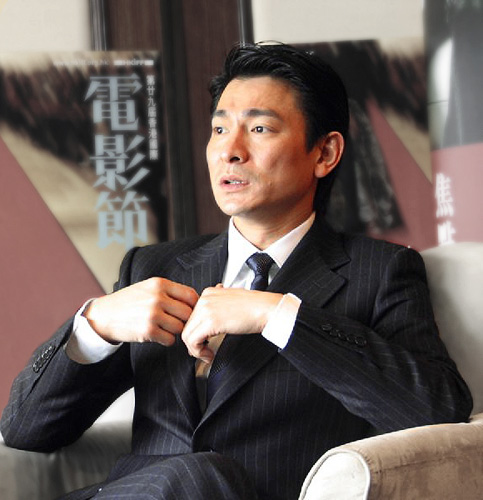
Leslie Cheung (left) was considered a pioneering Cantopop artist, and Andy Lau was an icon of Hong Kong music and film for several decades as a member of the Four Heavenly Kings.

Cantopop was a genre of Cantonese popular music which emerged in Hong Kong during the 1970s. Evolving from Shanghai-style shidaiqu, it was also influenced by Cantonese opera and Western pop. Local media featured songs by artists such as Sam Hui, Anita Mui, Leslie Cheung, and Alan Tam; during the 1980s, exported films and shows exposed Cantopop to a global audience. The genre's popularity peaked in the 1990s, when the Four Heavenly Kings dominated Asian record charts. Despite a general decline since late in the decade,

Western classical music historically had a strong presence in Hong Kong and remained a large part of local musical education. The publicly funded Hong Kong Philharmonic Orchestra, the territory's oldest professional symphony orchestra, frequently hosts musicians and conductors from overseas. The Hong Kong Chinese Orchestra, composed of classical Chinese instruments, was the leading Chinese ensemble and played a significant role in promoting traditional music in the community.

=== Sport and recreation ===
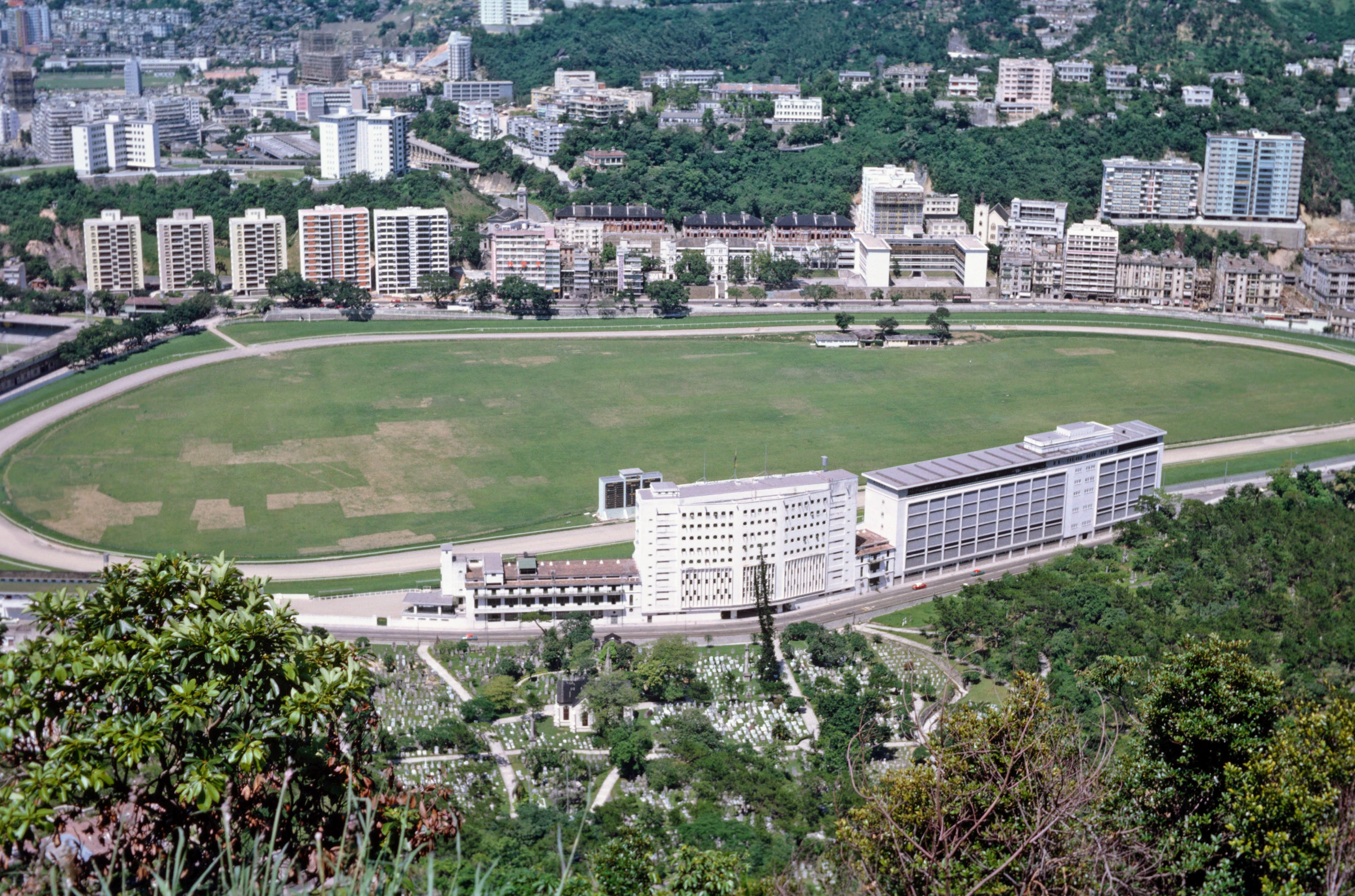
Happy Valley Racecourse, 1963

Despite its small area, the territory regularly hosted the Hong Kong Sevens, Hong Kong Marathon, Hong Kong Tennis Classic and Lunar New Year Cup, and hosted the inaugural AFC Asian Cup and the 1995 Dynasty Cup.

Hong Kong was separately represented from mainland China, with its own sports teams in international competitions. The territory participated in almost every Summer Olympics since 1952 and earned a gold medal. Lee Lai-shan won the territory's first Olympic gold medal at the 1996 Atlanta Olympics, Between 1972 and 1996, Hong Kong athletes won 60 medals at the Paralympic Games. As part of the Commonwealth, British Hong Kong participated in the Commonwealth Games, in which it won 17 medals, the city's last appearance in the Games being in 1994.

Dragon boat races originated as a religious ceremony conducted during the annual Tuen Ng Festival. The race was revived as a modern sport as part of the Tourism Board's efforts to promote Hong Kong's image abroad. The first modern competition was organised in 1976, and overseas teams began competing in the first international race in 1993.

The Hong Kong Jockey Club, known between 1960 and 1996 as the Royal Hong Kong Jockey Club, became the territory's largest taxpayer. Three forms of gambling were legal in Hong Kong: lotteries, horse racing, and football.

== Dissent ==
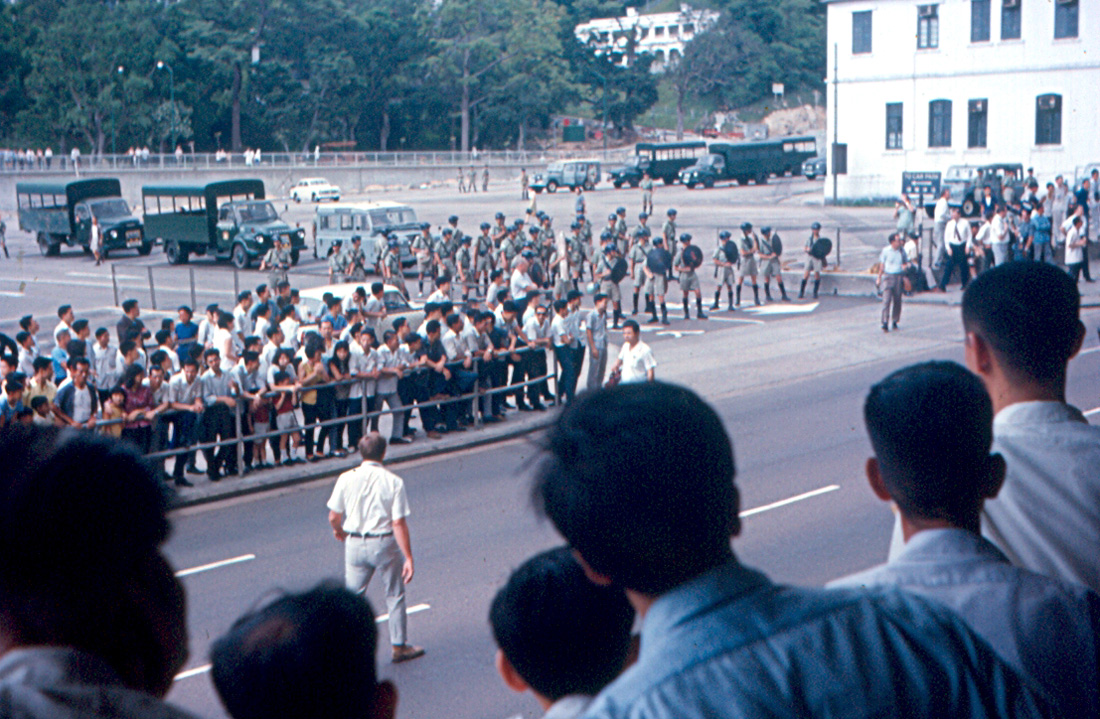
Police confrontation during the 1967 leftist riots

During China's turbulent 20th century, Hong Kong served as a safe haven for dissidents, political refugees, and officials who had lost power. British policy allowed dissidents to live in Hong Kong as long as they did not break local laws or harm British interests. The implementation of this policy varied according to what the senior officials thought constituted British interests and the state of relations with China. The Canton–Hong Kong strike (1925–1926) was anti-imperialist in nature. The 1966 riots and Maoist-led 1967 riots, essentially spillovers from the Cultural Revolution, were large scale demonstrations fuelled by tensions surrounding labour disputes and dissatisfaction towards the government. Although the 1967 riots started as a labour dispute, the incident escalated quickly after the leftist camp and mainland officials stationed in Hong Kong seized the opportunity to mobilise their followers to protest against the colonial government. Chinese Communist Party supporters organised the Anti-British Struggle Committee during the riots.

Steve Tsang, director of the China Institute of the School of Oriental and African Studies at the University of London, wrote that it was "ironic" that despite Hong Kong being a symbol of China's humiliation by Britain, there was not one major movement started by the Chinese residents of the colony for its retrocession to China, even though there had been several upsurges of Chinese nationalism. He explained:

In the 1920s, the working class Chinese of Hong Kong did not have a good reason to rally around the Hong Kong government, and they were more susceptible to appeals based on Chinese nationalism. Consequently, the call of the Communists was basically heeded by the working men, and their actions practically paralysed the colony for a year. By the [end of the] 1960s, however, the attempts by the Hong Kong government to maintain stability and good order which helped improve everyone's living conditions, and ... the beginning of the emergence of a Hong Kong identity, changed the attitude of the local Chinese. They overwhelmingly rallied around the colonial British regime.

== See also ==
- British Military Hospital
- English Schools Foundation
- Royal Hong Kong Regiment
- Political Department
- Flags of Elizabeth II
- British Forces Overseas Hong Kong
- Commander British Forces in Hong Kong
