= Eastern Western Monthly Magazine =

- Traditional Chinese: 東西洋考每月統記傳
- Simplified Chinese: 东西洋考每月统记传
Transcriptions
Standard Mandarin
- Hanyu Pinyin: Dōng Xīyáng Kǎo Měiyuè Tǒngjì Zhuàn
Yue: Cantonese
- Jyutping: Dung1 Sai1 Joeng4 Haau2 Mui5 Jyut6 Tung2 Gei3
Southern Min
- Hokkien POJ: Tang-sai Iûⁿ-khó Múi-goe̍h Thong-kì-toān
- Tâi-lô: Tang-sai Iûnn-khó Muí-gue̍h Thong-kì-tuān

Eastern Western Monthly Magazine was the inaugural modern-age Chinese language magazine first published on August 1, 1833 in Canton (Guangzhou), China by the Prussian Protestant Missionary Karl Gützlaff at a time when foreign missionaries risked strangulation or deportation. In 1837, due to increasingly strained Sino-British relations presaging the First Opium War, the magazine moved to Singapore with its last issue appearing in 1838. Contributors included fellow missionaries Robert Morrison and his son John amongst others, with the publication covering religion, politics, science, commerce and miscellaneous topics.

== History ==
Originally from Prussia, Gützlaff arrived in Southeast Asia as a missionary for the Netherlands Missionary Society in 1827 but shortly afterwards left to join the London Missionary Society. At the beginning of 1831 he set out on a tour of China and soon became dismayed at the widespread view amongst the Chinese that Westerners were "Barbarians". Gützlaff announced that he would start a monthly magazine that would correct this impression by introducing the ideas of Western art and science and promote understanding and friendship. In March 1834 the magazine carried an article entitled "A Discussion of Newspaper Strategy" 《新闻纸略论》 (Xīnwénzhǐ Luè Lùn), which was the first treatise on the Western press to appear in China. Although only 331 words long, the article covered newspaper origination, freedom of the press and reviewed the details of a number of Western papers. Copies of the magazine were circulated to Nanking (Nanjing), Peking (Beijing) and other cities but its reception is not recorded.

The magazine ceased publication after Issue 10 in May 1834, restarted in February 1835 only to cease again in July of the same year. The magazine relocated to Singapore in 1837, printing its last issue in 1838.

== Publication style and features ==
The Eastern Western Monthly Magazine employed Chinese style printing techniques using wooden blocks with a structure similar to Chinese Monthly Magazine 《zh:察世俗每月统计传》 produced by Robert Morrison, Walter Henry Medhurst and William Milne. Although edited by a missionary, the magazine played down this aspect, focusing instead on promoting the superiority of Western culture and criticising the Chinese people's arrogant xenophobic attitude in three sections covering religion, morals and ethics and scientific thought. Gützlaff wrote in the prospectus:

"The monthly periodical, which is now offered for the patronage of the foreign community of Canton and Macao, is published with a view to counteract these high and exclusive notions [the Chinese profess to be first among the nations on earth, and regard all others as 'Barbarians'.], by making the Chinese acquainted with our arts, sciences, and principles. It will not treat of politics, nor tend to exasperate their minds by harsh language upon any subject. There is a more excellent way to show that we are not indeed 'Barbarians', and the Editor prefers the method of exhibiting facts, to convince the Chinese that they still have very much to learn. Aware also, of the relation in which foreigners stand to the native authorities, the Editor has endeavoured to conciliate their friendship, and hopes ultimately to prove successful.

Gützlaff's pseudonym, "One who loves the Chinese" (爱汉者), appeared on the front cover of early issues of the magazine.

== Surviving copies ==
Despite its importance for research into historical Sino-western exchanges, few copies of the Eastern Western Magazine still exist in China although 39 issues are held in the Harvard University Yenching Institute (燕京学社) Library.

== Bibliography ==
- Britton, Roswell S. (1933). The Chinese Periodical Press 1800-1912. Shanghai, Kelly & Walsh.
- Zhang, Xiantao (2007). The Origins of the Modern Chinese Press: The Influence of the Protestant Missionary Press in Late Qing China (Media, Culture and Social Change in Asia Series). ISBN 978-0415380669.
