= Samuel Dyer =

British missionary

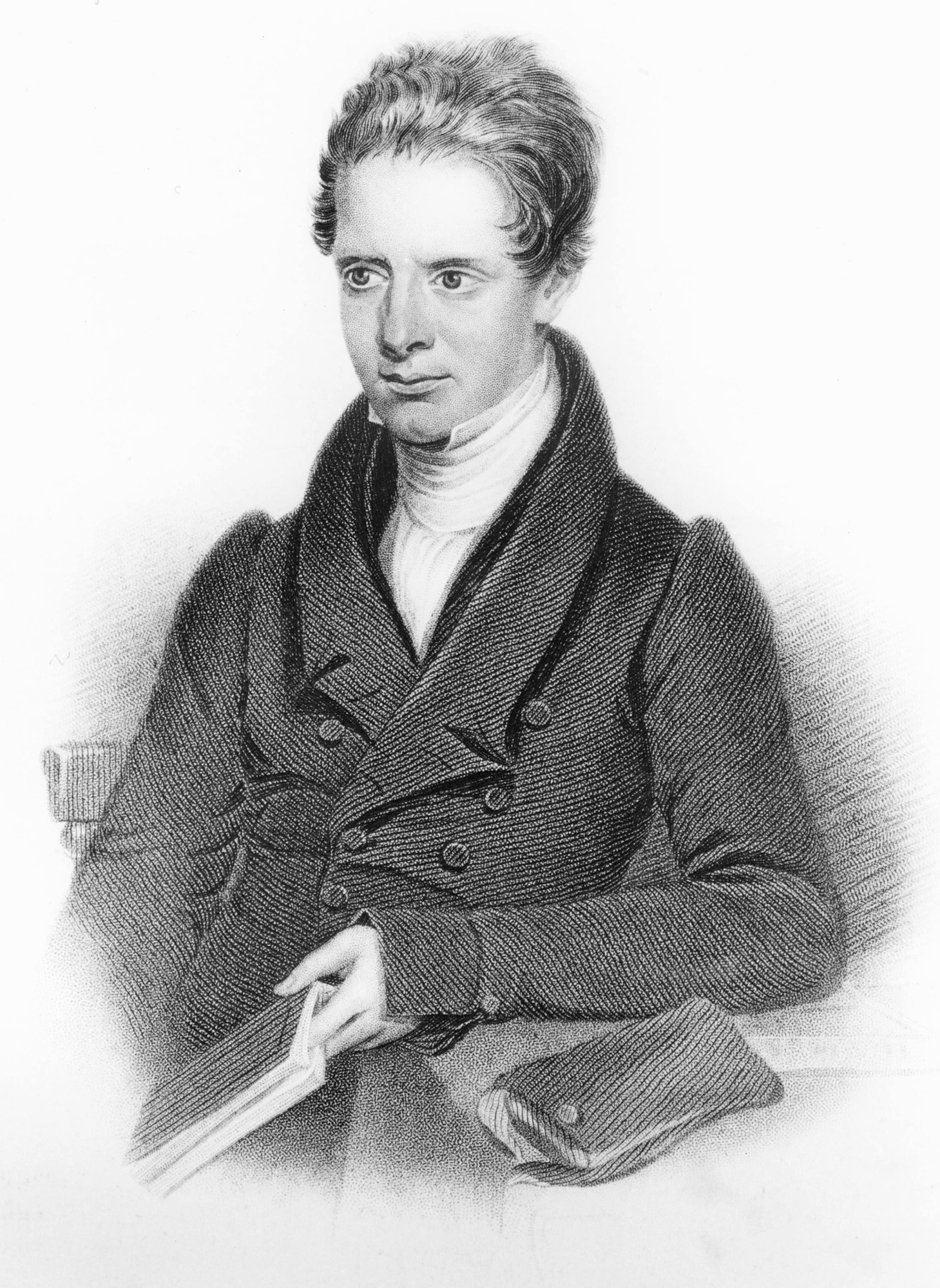
- Missionary to the Chinese
- Born: 20 February 1804; Greenwich, England
- Died: 24 October 1843 (aged 39); Portuguese Macau
- Spouse(s): Maria Dyer (née Tarn)
- Parent(s): John Dyer; Eliza Seager

Samuel Dyer
- Traditional Chinese: 台約爾
- Simplified Chinese: 台约尔
Transcriptions
Standard Mandarin
- Hanyu Pinyin: Tái Yāoěr
- Wade–Giles: T'ai2 Yao1-erh3

Samuel Dyer (Chinese: 台約爾, 20 February 1804 – 24 October 1843) was a British Protestant Christian missionary to China in the Congregationalist tradition who worked among the Chinese in Malaysia. He arrived in Penang in 1827. Dyer, his wife Maria, and their family lived in Malacca and then in Singapore. He was known as a typographer for creating a steel typeface of Chinese characters for printing to replace traditional wood blocks. Dyer's type was accurate, aesthetically pleasing, durable, and practical.

== Life in England ==
Samuel Dyer was born at the Royal Greenwich Hospital, England, to John Dyer and Eliza (Seager). He was the fifth of the eight Dyer children. His father was a secretary of the Royal Hospital for Seaman and later became Chief clerk of the Admiralty in 1820. John was also an acquaintance of Robert Morrison, who was soon to become the first Protestant missionary to China. Morrison and his Chinese tutor Yong Sam-tek visited the Dyer home in Greenwich during Morrison's period of study in medicine and astronomy between 1805 and 1806.

Dyer was schooled at home until he was 12 and then educated in a boarding school at Woolwich, in south-east London from 1816, superintended by the Rev. John Bickerdike, a minister with the English Dissenters.

In 1820 he experienced a conversion to Christ at Thomas Wilson's Paddington Chapel, in Paddington, Northwest London, under ministry of the Rev. James Stratten, and soon Dyer began teaching Sunday school there. In 1822 he was formally admitted into membership.

Dyer later wrote about his time there:

Paddington lives in my warmest affections. It was there that I kneeled on the separating line between Christ and the world. I kneeled and prayed for strength to side with Christ; I arose, and was inwardly assisted to turn my back upon the world. And from that good day to this, Jesus has been precious to my soul.

He studied law and mathematics at Trinity Hall, Cambridge, but in 1823 he withdrew from University in his fifth term, refusing for conscience sake to declare himself a member of Church of England to graduate. While studying law, he read a pamphlet from his father's study, the "Memoir of Mrs. Charles Mead of the London Missionary Society in Travancore, India", which afterwards turned his thoughts to the missionary service that would occupy the rest of his life. The pamphlet consisted of sermon preached at Mrs. Mead's funeral, '’All for Christ and the Good of Souls'’, the text of which is taken from Rev. 12:11: "and they loved not their lives unto the death."

In '’A Sketch of Mr. Dyer's Life and Character'’, his wife Maria would later write, "The reading of the pamphlet 'Memoir of Mrs. Mead' so powerfully impressed his mind with the importance of consecrating himself to missionary work, that when he began to study again, on Monday morning, he found he could not proceed; and every time he read this Memoir it had the same effect: so that at last he determined to give up the Bar, and devote himself to the work of Christ among the heathen."

Dyer soon had opportunity to study the Chinese under Robert Morrison, who had returned on furlough. It was there that he met two aspiring female missionaries: Mary Ann Aldersey (the first female missionary to China), and Maria Tarn, whom he later married.

In 1824 Dyer applied to the London Missionary Society. Then he joined the LMS seminary at Gosport, Hampshire, to study theology under Dr. David Bogue. His health began to suffer because of his intense regimen of study at Gosport, walking long distances to preach in villages on Sunday, and his habits of self-denial. He travelled to Islington to recuperate and study theology, Chinese, and the art of printing, punchcutting, and type-founding.

Dyer also studied under John Pye Smith at Homerton. Smith combined missionary, philological, and scientific interests.

Dyer then entered the London Missionary Society training centre at Hoxton where his chief attention was given to the Chinese language, reading the Chinese Bible for devotions. In 1827 Samuel Dyer was ordained at Paddington Chapel where he preached, taught and was commissioned as a missionary of the Gospel.

He was married to Maria Tarn, eldest daughter of Joseph Tarn, Director of London Missionary Society, in London in 1827, and shortly afterward the newly wed couple set sail for what was then considered "Ultra-Ganges" India with the Ultra-Ganges Missions, where the only way to live and work among native Chinese could be obtained. Now it is in an area of Malaysia. It was also known as the "British Straits Settlement". Dyer had been ordained and commissioned on 20 February 1827 at Paddington Chapel, London.

The inscription in remembrance of Samuel Dyer at Paddington Chapel read:

IN REMEMBRANCE
Of SAMUEL DYER
Who was for several years a humble, pious, and faithful
Teacher in this School
And who, devoting himself to the service of his blessed
Redeemer
Was on 20 February 1827,
Here solemnly set apart as a
Missionary of the Gospel,
And having left his native land for the shores of India, in the providence of
God, arrived safely at his destination,
PENANG
Or, Prince of Wales Island, in the China Sea,
August 8, 1827.
Faith unfeigned, sincere brotherly love, patient continuance in well-doing,
and the ornament of a meek and quiet spirit, endeared him to us while
he laboured here; and his memory will long be cherished with affectionate
regard by all who knew him. To perpetuate the remembrance of
such an example of self-denial and missionary zeal, this humble memorial
is set up.
“The Lord Jesus Christ be with thy spirit." 2 Tim. 4:22

== Missionary life ==
Samuel and Maria had five children while overseas. Maria Dyer (born at Penang 1829–1831), Samuel Dyer Jr. (born at Penang 1833–1898), Burella Hunter Dyer (born at Penang 1835–1858), Maria Jane Dyer (born at Malacca 1837–1870), and Ebenezer Dyer (born at Singapore 1842-aft. October 1843)

Samuel Dyer and his wife left England on 10 March 1827, and they arrived at Penang, in the Straits of Malacca, on 8 August 1827. The Dyers were to have gone on to Anglo-Chinese College in Malacca, but a lack of workers lead them to stay in Penang and settle in the Chinese sector of town. They both began studying the Min nan dialect (Hokkien) spoken by the local population.

After gaining some knowledge of the language, Dyer faced the challenge of producing movable metallic types for the thousands of Chinese characters. He started with a systematic analysis of characters and strokes. At first, using wood reliefs to create the clay moulds from which type could be cast, he soon moved to steel punches and copper matrixes. Dyer's linguistic abilities, meticulous planning, and painstaking attention to detail resulted in Chinese fonts of high quality. They were later passed on to the American Presbyterian Mission Press in China and played a significant part in its development.

Chinese School

Maria opened school for girls with 23 students, but she was forced to close it later in the year. By 1828 Samuel was preaching in Chinese only 5 months after their arrival. He grew committed to the production of Christian literature in Chinese, printing Bibles, tracts, and books with the moveable, metal-cast type with a controlled vocabulary that he developed.

In 1829 they had their first daughter, Maria, who died about two years later. The same year, in 1831, Samuel visited Malacca, the headquarters of the London Missionary Society's Chinese ministries.

In 1833 the Dyers had a boy named Samuel. About this same time some in the Chinese community requested a school. During this period Samuel was hard at work on a revision of the translation of Matthew's Gospel in Chinese. The amount of work that still was left to be done prompted him to write to England in the following year, appealing for more workers to be sent out. Robert Morrison died at Guangzhou in 1834.

1835 brought another daughter, Burella Hunter, to the Dyer family at Penang. Samuel then took his family to Malacca to join the London Missionary Society China Mission headquarters. The Dyers established 2 schools, with the curriculum including reading, writing, sewing, and embroidery. There Samuel worked with Liang Fa (who had been baptised by William Milne in 1819).

Dyer soon recognised the strategic importance of his metal-type printing and proceeded with the revision of the Chinese Bible at Malacca.

Another daughter, Maria Jane Dyer, was born in 1837 at Malacca.

== Furlough and return to Asia ==
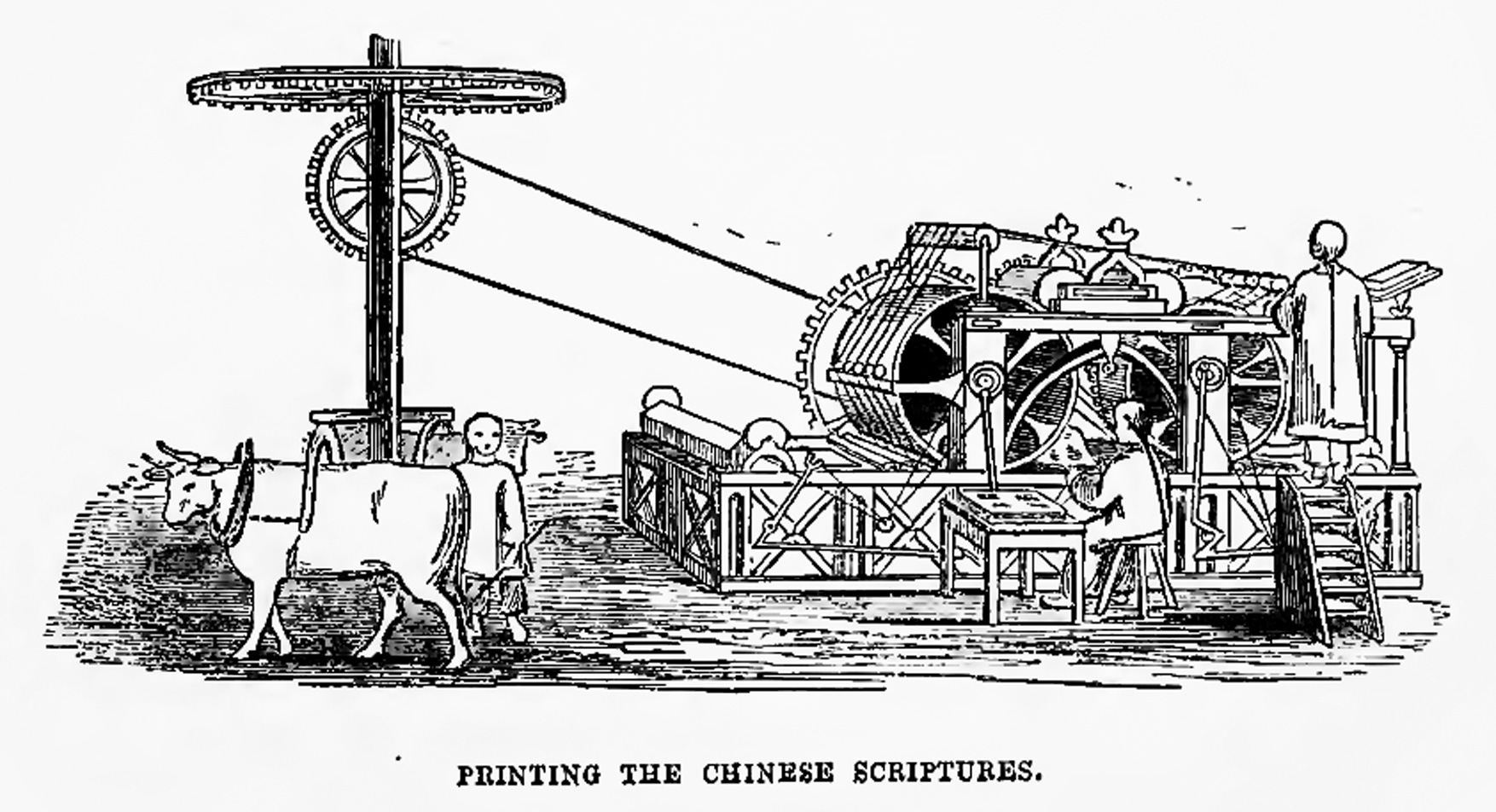
Printing the Chinese Bible

Samuel and Maria had been at the LMS Penang station from 1827 to 1835. They were at the Malacca station from 1835 to 1839. The Dyers went on furlough from 1839 to 1842. It was the first time that their children had seen England.

On 19 September 1839 the Dyer family arrived in England. Maria was ill with what was thought to be a liver problem. The Dyers remained in England until 1841, when they left again for the Ultra-Ganges Missions, this time to Singapore. A single woman named Buckland accompanied them and helped Maria with the three children. They arrived in Singapore in 1842 and rented the mission-house of the American Board of Commissioners for Foreign Missions, there.

Samuel began work with John Stronach of the LMS and began learning Teochew dialect. He also worked on a revision of the Chinese Bible, translations, preparation of books, type-casting, printing, and a comparative vocabulary of Chinese language.

Dyer printed "Two Friends" by William Milne, a "Commentary on 10 Commandments" by Walter Henry Medhurst, and the "Miracles of Christ". He also helped Chaozhou, a Christian teacher compile the "Life of Christ".

During this busy period, Dyer conducted religious services through the week, visited house-to-house, preached in the bazaars, and visited Chinese junks in the harbour to reach the Chinese there with the gospel message.

Maria established a Chinese Girls' Boarding School with 20 students in their home (at the present-day site of Raffles Hotel); the school later became St. Margaret's Primary School.

Dyer moved the LMS press from Malacca to Singapore on James Legge's suggestion before the end of 1842.

1842 brought another son, Ebenezer Dyer. The Treaty of Nanking was signed, raising hopes that missionary work could soon begin in mainland China.

Dyer preached the first sermon at the Malay Chapel in Prinsep Street opened by Benjamin Peach Keasberry in 1843. That summer he left with John Stronach for the LMS conference in Hong Kong. His family would never see him again.

== Final days ==
Dyer was able to finally reach China on 7 August 1843 at Hong Kong. At the LMS general conference he was appointed as Conference Secretary. The Dyers were appointed to go to Fuzhou, Fujian, to open missionary work there.

Samuel visited Guangzhou, where he had a severe attack of fever and was cared for by Peter Parker, M.D. He was taken to Macau and died there on 21 October 1843. This was the same outbreak that took the life of Robert Morrison's son, John Robert Morrison, at Guangzhou. Dyer was buried next to the graves of Robert and Mary Morrison at the Old Protestant Cemetery in Macau.

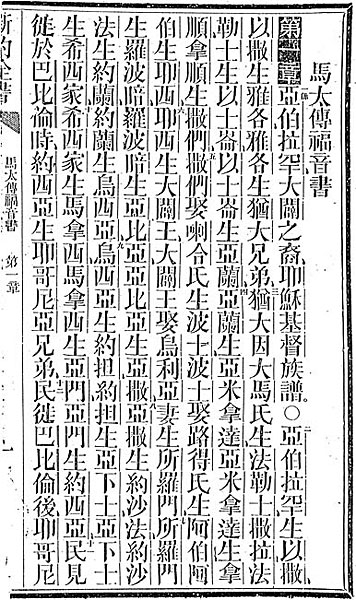
A page in Chinese printed by Samuel Dyer

Dyer had once written:

If I thought anything would prevent my dying for China, the thought would crush me.

Maria Dyer died three years later at Penang, leaving 3 children in the care of her second husband, Johann Georg Bausum. A fellow missionary to Penang, Evan Davies, wrote a memoir of Samuel Dyer and a volume of Samuel's letters to his children in 1846. The Chinese Repository recorded his obituary and mentioned that,

His attainments in speaking the Fukien dialect were of the first order, and he had already published a small Vocabulary and a translation of Thom's Esop's Fables in the colloquial, and had commenced another larger vocabulary. Besides preaching among the people, Mr. Dyer had also devoted much of his time to the cutting of punches for a font of Chinese types, in which he had attained to a great degree of perfection. One large and one small font are now partly done...

The type that came to be known as Dyer's Penang font became the standard in Chinese printing until the 1850s, when it was replaced by William Gamble's font in 1859.

All three of the Dyers' surviving children became involved in work to spread the Gospel in China. The Dyers' daughters returned to China as teenagers and worked with Mary Ann Aldersey at her school for Chinese girls in Ningbo, Zhejiang. Maria Jane Dyer married James Hudson Taylor, who went on to found the China Inland Mission. She had a strong influence in the beginnings of that agency. Burella Dyer had married a year earlier to John Shaw Burdon, but had died in Shanghai very soon after they were married. Samuel Dyer Jr., succeeded Alexander Wylie with the British and Foreign Bible Society as their agent in China in the 1870s.

== Epitaph in Macau ==
His tombstone inscription reads:

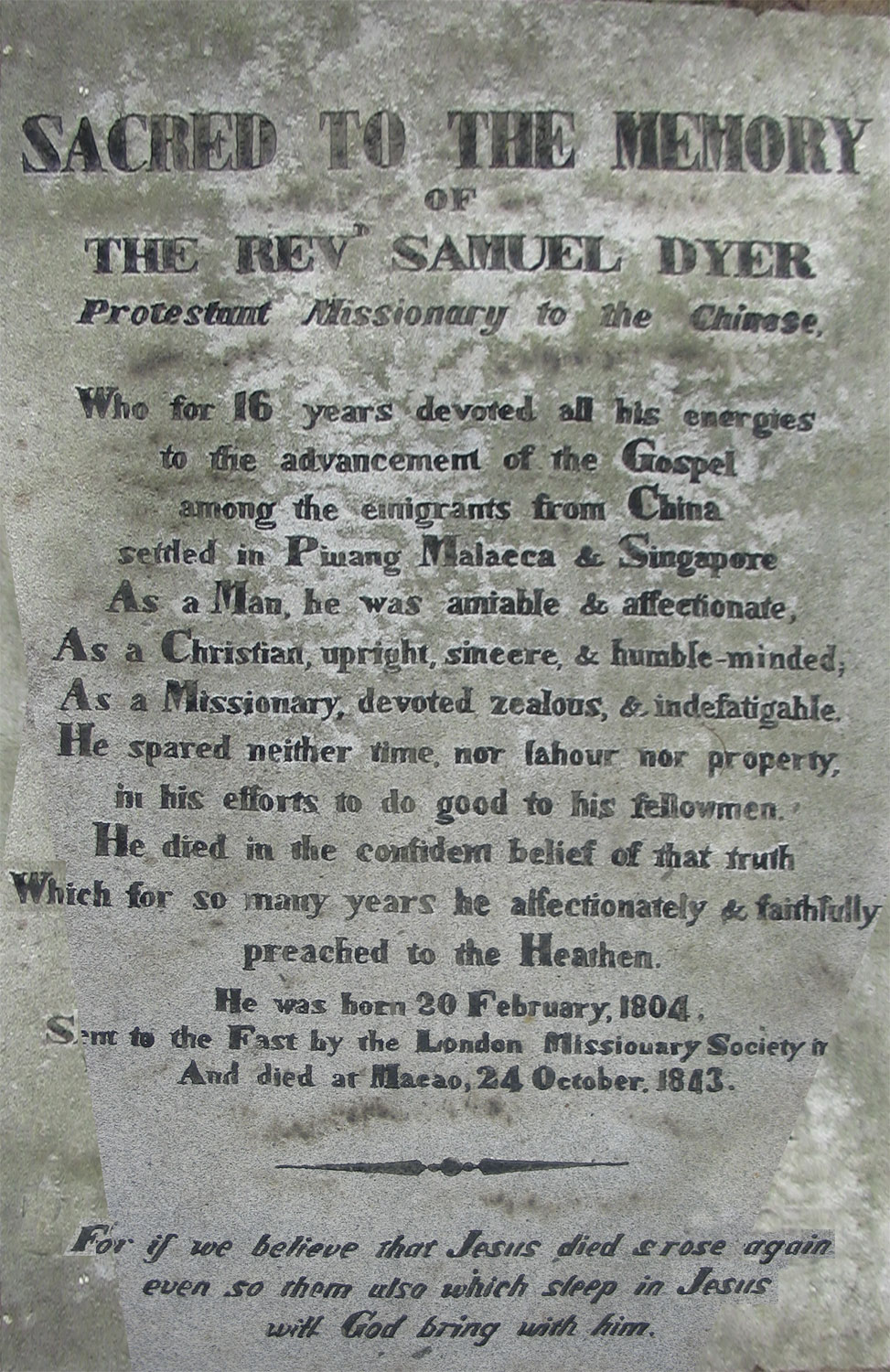
Samuel Dyer's tombstone

SACRED TO THE MEMORY OF THE REV SAMUEL DYER
Protestant Missionary to the Chinese,
Who for 16 years devoted all his energies
to the advancement of the Gospel
among the emigrants from China
settled in Pinang Malacca and Singapore.
As a Man, he was amiable & affectionate,
As a Christian, upright, sincere, & humble-minded,
As a Missionary, devoted zealous, & indefatigable.
He spared neither time, nor labour nor property,
in his efforts to do good to his fellowmen.
He died in the confident belief of that truth
which for so many years he affectionately & faithfully
preached to the Heathen.
He was born 20 February 1804,
Sent to the East by the London Missionary Society
And died at Macao, 24 October. 1843.
For if we believe that Jesus died and rose again,
even so them also which sleep in Jesus
will God bring with him.
(1Th 4:14)

== Published works ==
- Vocabulary of the Hokkien Dialect (1838)
- A Selection of Three Thousand Characters Being the Most Important in the Chinese Language for the Purpose of Facilitating the Cutting of Punches and Casting Metal type in Chinese (1834)
- Aesop's Fables (in Hokkien, 1843)

== See also ==
- History of typography in East Asia

== Bibliography ==
- Taylor, James Hudson III, Chang, Irene; Even to Death – The Life and Legacy of Samuel Dyer. Hong Kong: OMF Books, 2009.
- Stronach, John; The blessedness of those who die in the Lord: a sermon occasioned by the death of the Rev. Samuel Dyer, missionary to the Chinese, (which took place at Macao 24 October 1843): preached in the New Mission Chapel, Singapore, 9 November 1843, by John Stronach, Mr. Dyer's colleague in the Chinese Mission at Singapore; with a sketch of Mr. Dyer's life and character by his widow. Singapore: Mission Press, 1843.
- Biographical Dictionary of Christian Mission
- Broomhall, AJ, Hudson Taylor and China's Open Century Vol I, II, III, Hodder & Stoughton, London, 1981
- Griffiths, Valerie, Not Less Than Everything, Monarch Books & OMF International, Oxford, 2004
- Ismail, Ibrahim bin, Samuel Dyer and His Contributions to Chinese Typography; Library Quarterly, v54 n2 p157-69 Apr 1984
- Latourette, Kenneth Scott, A History of Christian Missions in China, Society for Promoting Christian Knowledge, London, 1929
- Lovett, Richard, The History of the London Missionary Society 1795–1895 Volume One, Henry Frowde, London, 1899
- Lovett, Richard (1899). The History of the London Missionary Society 1795–1895. H. Frowde. Volume Two, Henry Frowde, London, 1899
- Register of LMS Missionaries, 1796–1923, Prepared by James Sibree, LMS, London, 1923
- Sng, Bobby, In His Good Time: The Story of the Church in Singapore, Bible Society of Singapore, 2003
- Historical Bibliography of the China Inland Mission
