= Ultra-Ganges Missions =

The London Missionary Society outposts in Southeast Asia in the early 1800s

The Ultra-Ganges Missions were the London Missionary Society (LMS) outposts in Southeast Asia in the early 1800s. They were established as a way to develop missionary activities in China, which was not permitted before the Opium Wars.

== History ==
The first Protestant missionary to China, Robert Morrison on the LMS in 1807, was only able to reach the edge of China in either the port of Canton or Macao. However, as China was closed to foreigners at the time, subsequent LMS missionaries established in the British and Dutch colonial region of the "Ultra Ganges" (literally, beyond the Ganges River), the Southeast Asian territories of Melaka (Malacca), Penang, Singapore, and Batavia (Jakarta). This created a complex situation, with competing centers of authority between the LMS directors in London and Morrison in Canton, as well as rivalries between missionaries and various colonial enterprises.

William Milne established the Melaka station in 1815, which became one of the major locations for the work of the LMS. Milne established the first Protestant Christian academy in Southeast or East Asia, the Anglo-Chinese College in 1818. It was an educational center and the location for the LMS printing press, where many missionary translations, Christian tracts, and other materials were printed. Milne's Anglo-Chinese College focused on Chinese children, and saw some of the first Protestant baptisms, such as Liang Fa in 1816, a Chinese printer who later became an important pastor and evangelist in China. The mission also worked with indigenous Malay people.

After the First Opium War and the Treaty of Nanking was signed in 1842, the LMS missionaries convened a meeting in 1843 in Hong Kong to discuss plans for the future of the Ultra-Ganges Missions. It was decided that all stations, with the exception of Singapore, was to move their work to Hong Kong or other parts of China. In 1843, the Anglo-Chinese College was re-established in Hong Kong. In 1846, the final missionaries in Singapore, John Stronach and Benjamin Keasberry were ordered to close the work and move to Hong Kong. Keasberry disagreed with this choice, resigned from the LMS, and stayed to continue work in Singapore.
