= Edwin Stevens =

Edwin Stevens may refer to:

- Edwin Stevens (missionary) (1802–1837), American protestant missionary in China
- Edwin Stevens (actor) (1860–1923), American stage and film actor
- Arthur Edwin Stevens (1905–1995), Welsh inventor who designed the world's first wearable electronic hearing aid
- Edwin Augustus Stevens (1794–1868), American inventor and entrepreneur
- Edwin Augustus Stevens Jr. (1858–1918), American soldier, engineer and architect

== See also ==
- Edwin A. Stevens Hall (built in 1870) in USA
- Edwin Stevens Lines (1845–1927), American clergyman, bishop of Newark
