= Maria Dyer =

British missionary

- Maria Dyer, née Tarn
- Born: Maria Tarn c. 1803; London, United Kingdom
- Died: 21 October 1846 (aged 42 - 43); Penang, Straits Settlements, British Malaya
- Burial place: Old Protestant Cemetery, Georgetown
- Citizenship: British
- Known for: Founding the Chinese Girls' School
- Spouse(s): Samuel Dyer (m. 1823); Johann Georg Bausum (m. 1845)
- Children: Maria; Samuel; Burella; Maria; Ebenezer
- Father: Joseph Tarn

Maria Dyer (née Tarn) (c. 1803 – 21 October 1846), was a British Protestant Christian missionary to the Chinese in the Congregationalist tradition, who worked among the Chinese in Malaya.

== Life ==
She was born in London in about 1803. She was the eldest daughter of Joseph Tarn, Director of London Missionary Society.

She arrived in Penang in 1827 with her husband, Samuel Dyer. The Dyers lived in Malacca and then finally in Singapore. Maria was known for founding the oldest girls' school in Singapore. It was known as the "Chinese Girls' School" when it was founded in 1842 (it still exists, now called St. Margaret's Secondary School). Her husband died in Macau in 1843 before being able to bring his family to live in China itself at Fuzhou. Maria Tarn later remarried, to Johann Georg Bausum in 1845, but she died the following year in Penang, at age 43, and was buried in the Protestant Cemetery there. In 1853 the Society for Promotion of Female Education in the East sent Sophia Cooke to Singapore to become the Principal of what was still called the "Chinese Girls' School".

Dyer's orphaned daughter, Maria Jane Dyer, married James Hudson Taylor, the founder of the China Inland Mission.

Samuel and Maria had five children: Maria Dyer (1829–1831), Samuel Dyer Jr. (1833–1898), Burella Hunter Dyer (1835–1858), Maria Jane Dyer (1837–1870), and Ebenezer Dyer (1842 – aft. Oct. 1843).

== Bibliography ==
- Davies, Evan (1846). The Memoir of Samuel Dyer: Sixteen Years Missionary to the Chinese. London: John Snow.

== Bibliography ==
- Taylor, James Hudson III; Chang, Irene; Even to Death - The Life and Legacy of Samuel Dyer. Hong Kong: OMF Books, 2009.

=== Further reading ===
- Historical Bibliography of the China Inland Mission
