= Stronach (surname) =

Stronach is a surname. Notable people with the surname include:

- Adam Stronach, English Christian missionary
- Alexander Stronach, English Protestant Christian missionary
- Ancell Stronach (1901–1981), Scottish artist
- Belinda Stronach (born 1966), Canadian politician and businessperson, daughter of Frank
- David Stronach (1931–2020), Scottish archeologist of ancient Iran and Iraq
- Frank Stronach (born 1932 as Franz Strohsack), Austrian and Canadian businessman and politician
  - Stronach Group, a gambling and horse racing company in North America
  - Stronach Stables, a North American Thoroughbred horse racing arm
  - Team Stronach, a defunct political party in Austria
- George Stronach (1912–1999), British Merchant Navy officer
- Gordon Stronach (1908–1968), Canadian politician
- Henry Stronach (1865–1932), New Zealand cricketer
- John Stronach (1810–1888), English Protestant Christian missionary, brother of Alexander
- Peter Stronach (born 1956), English football winger
- Tami Stronach (born 1972), American dancer and choreographer, daughter of David
