= Wat Ngong =

- Traditional Chinese: 屈亞昂
- Simplified Chinese: 屈亚昂
Transcriptions
Standard Mandarin
- Hanyu Pinyin: Qū Yà'áng
- Wade–Giles: Chʻü Ya-ang
Yue: Cantonese
- Jyutping: j=Wat¹ Aa³-ngong⁴

Wat Ngong (1785–1867), also known by various other names, was a Chinese Protestant convert, evangelist, and writer from Guangzhou during the Qing dynasty. He was an early lithographer in Malacca, Macao, Guangzhou, and Hong Kong, possibly the first Chinese to master the craft.

== Name ==
Wat's name was 屈亞昂, which is now romanized as Qu Ya'ang in pinyin. "Wat Ngong" is one way of writing the Cantonese pronunciation of the same characters. It is also variously romanized as Kew-a-gong, "Kew-Agang", or Kew A-gang, A-gong, "Agong", or Ah Gung; as Keuh Agong or "A-gong"; and as Wat A-gong or A-ngong.

== Life ==
Wat was born in 1785. (Note: The Chinese Recorder mistakenly states that he was 40 at his baptism in 1830, based on a passage in Morrison's journals that notes he was about that age.) The missionaries later reported that his life before meeting them had been "improvident", having abandoned his wife and child "entirely" and wandering without any regular employment. He apparently visited England "several times" before 1816. Wylie records that he was "connected with the London Mission as a printer, almost from its first establishment", but he passes unmentioned in Robert Morrison's journals of his early years in Macao and Guangzhou (then romanized as "Canton"). Morrison, the first Protestant missionary in the Qing Empire, undertook translation and adaption of the 1714 Kangxi Dictionary alongside his translation of the Bible into Chinese. Through his comprador Yong Sam-tak, he either hired trained printers or trained his hired servants to cut the wooden type and operate the presses needed. He also asked his employees to attend Sunday services and daily meetings at his home.

Wat was noted by the Chinese Recorder as having received his initial Christian instruction not from Morrison but from William Milne, which would have occurred after he had (illegally) left Guangdong for Malacca around 1815. In Malacca, he worked for Milne at the Anglo-Chinese College along with Liang Fa, who instructed him in the art of printing and successfully converted him to belief in Christianity. As Liang's assistant, he helped print Morrison and Milne's Bible. His son Ahe also worked as a typesetter for Morrison's dictionary.

He was baptized by Morrison on Macao on 21 February 1830. In addition to his studies with Milne and Liang, he had received additional instruction from Morrison in the months leading up to this. Following his baptism, he reconciled with his family despite the difficulty occasioned by his wife's devotion to "idols". He endured persecution for his faith, association with foreigners, and travels abroad.

The same year, he accompanied Liang on a roughly 250-mile (402 km) journey to distribute Christian literature through the interior of Guangdong southwest of Guangzhou. They distributed about 7,000 tracts—some hundreds of pages long—which they had written and printed themselves. They joined the entourage of one of the imperial examiners and passed from prefecture to prefecture, proselytizing among the scholars who assembled for the tests. In 1831, Wat was engaged by the London Missionary Society as a Native Assistant and, in 1833, he is noted as having regularly attended Morrison's daily meetings. There are unclear references to some long-standing dispute between Wat and Liang that was eventually resolved; they worked together in Malacca and again to continue the mission with another native worker (Note: Possibly Liang's other assistant "Le-Asin".) after Morrison's death in 1834.

In the early 1830s, Morrison's son John trained Wat to use the mission's recently imported Albion press and in the art of lithography, which reduced the effort, time, and expense of printing. From this, Wat has been called the first Chinese to master the craft, although his work is often overlooked by Chinese scholars. He busied himself with printing at Macao, distributing his works among his family and acquaintances and explaining their content. He ran Medhurst's printshop in Guangzhou after 1832, Morrison probably having removed the lithographic machine there from Macao. He used it to print "scripture sheets, tracts, &c."

Britain's 1833 Government of India Act ended the East India Company's legal monopoly on the Canton trade. Amid the diplomatic crisis occasioned by the uptick in opium smuggling and Lord Napier's resort to force to assert his right to act as the British consul in Guangzhou, the Emperor personally expressed disbelief that westerners were responsible for the Chinese-language magazines and broadsides being distributed by the British. Qing subjects were forbidden to teach to the language, and a crackdown was ordered. In 1835, a warrant was issued for Wat's arrest after it was made known to the authorities that he was printing for the British. He had advance warning and fled to the English ships at Lintin Island, whence he returned to Malacca in 1836. His son Ahe was tricked into leaving Morrison's house and arrested in the street; as the boy proved a ready informant, he was kept a long time but treated well. While in Malacca, Liang and Wat caused a "spike" in conversions, netting more than thirty converts in a span of months. When many of these new converts later abandoned the faith, it prompted disputes within the LMS about the meaning and requirements for baptism.

When James Legge moved from Malacca to Hong Kong in 1843 (Note: Wylie gives the mistaken date 1844.) to supervise the establishment of its new theological seminary, Wat accompanied him, along with He Futang (Note: Chinese: 何福堂, Hé Fútáng, also known as Ho Fuk-tong and as Ho Tsun-shin or Tsun-Sheen (何進善, Hé Jìnshàn). He would serve as Hong Kong's first Chinese pastor and the namesake of its Hoh Fuk Tong Centre.) and He Yasan. (Note: Chinese: 何亞三, Hé Yàsān, also known as Ho A-san, A-sam, or A-sun. He ran a printshop connected with the mission and served as its blockcutter.) Wat worked with Legge at the Medical Missionary Hospital on Morrison Hill. Liang Fa also joined them.

In 1853, during the early stages of the Taipings' victories in central China, Legge sent Wat and Wu Wenxiu (Note: Chinese: 吳文秀, Wú Wénxiù, also known as Ng Mun-sow.) to Shanghai to negotiate with them for the entrance of Protestant missionaries to occupied Nanjing. After six months in the city, the two men considered the embassy a failure and returned to Hong Kong.

Wat died in 1867.

== Works ==
In addition to the works by Morrison, Milne, Liang, and others that Wat assisted with editing and printing, he was directly responsible for various Chinese-language tracts.

His 1833 Picture Tracts were a series of single-page tracts with scriptural passages in Chinese on one side and illustrations on the reverse. They included:

- A Collection of Scriptures on the Being and Perfections of the Great Creator, in Opposition to Idols, 1833. (in Chinese)
- The Beatitudes, 1833. (in Chinese)
- "Paul's Speech on Mars Hill", 1833. (in Chinese)
