= Sophia Cooke =

British missionary (1814–1895)

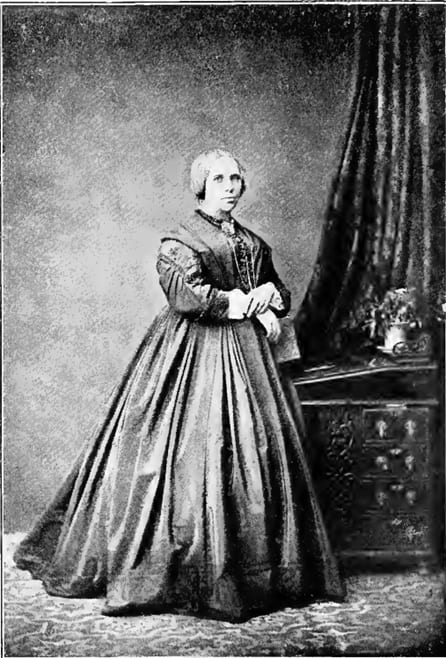
- Born: 27 February 1814; Hilborough
- Died: 14 September 1895 (aged 81); Singapore
- Occupations: educator and missionary

Sophia Cooke (27 February 1814 – 14 September 1895) was a British missionary and schoolmistress at what is now St. Margaret's Secondary School in Singapore. She arranged church services in Chinese and helped distribute bibles in Malay and Arabic. She founded the YWCA in Singapore.

== Life ==
Cooke was born in Hilborough in Norfolk and for twenty years she worked as a governess before she was sent to Singapore.

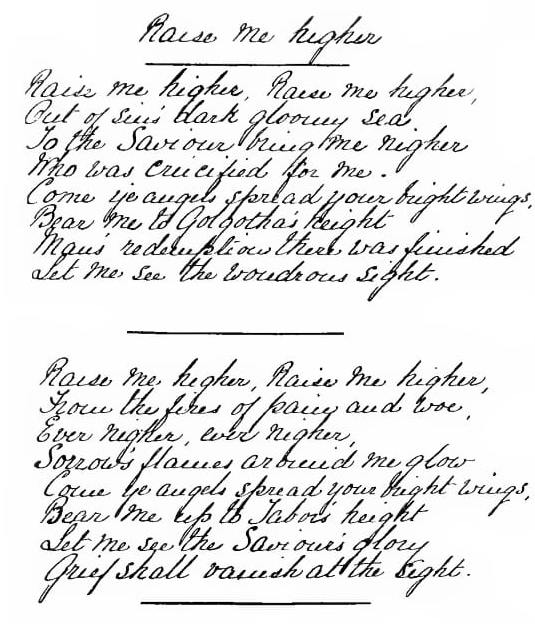
Sample school work from the school she led.

The (now) oldest girls’ school in Singapore and the Far East was founded in 1842 by Maria Dyer, a missionary of the London Missionary Society. In 1853 the Society for Promotion of Female Education in the East sent Cooke to Singapore to become the Principal of what was then called the "Chinese Girls' School". The school provided a basic education for girls as well as a home for orphans.

Cooke would use her influence to persuade the Anglican chaplain to begin a mission there. The society paid Cooke's salary but she had to rely on fund raising to keep the school viable. She arranged for Christian services to be conducted in Chinese in the school grounds. This demonstration is said to have encouraged the local churches to also offer worship in Chinese.

The only other missionary when Cooke arrived was Benjamin Keasberry who was an independent missionary. He had created a Malay translation of the Bible in 1853 in roman letter and an Arabic translation in 1856 and he had the means to print it. The bibles were distributed by the Singapore Ladies' Bible and Tract Society which Cooke had set up in 1857. After nearly a decade Cooke returned to England for a break. She returned, but after 1869 she was periodically ill and had to return to England to recover.

Cooke established of the Young Women's Christian Association in Singapore in 1875.

In 1870, the first lay chaplain of St. George's Church, Singapore, Major Malan, together with Cooke revived the Auxiliary by separating the Bible department from the Tract department of Cooke's society.

== Death and legacy ==
Cooke died in Singapore. St. Margaret's Secondary School continues in Singapore. There is a Sophia Cooke Ballroom and Sophia Road in Singapore is named for her.
