= Minqing County =

Minqing 闽清县 Mintsing
- County
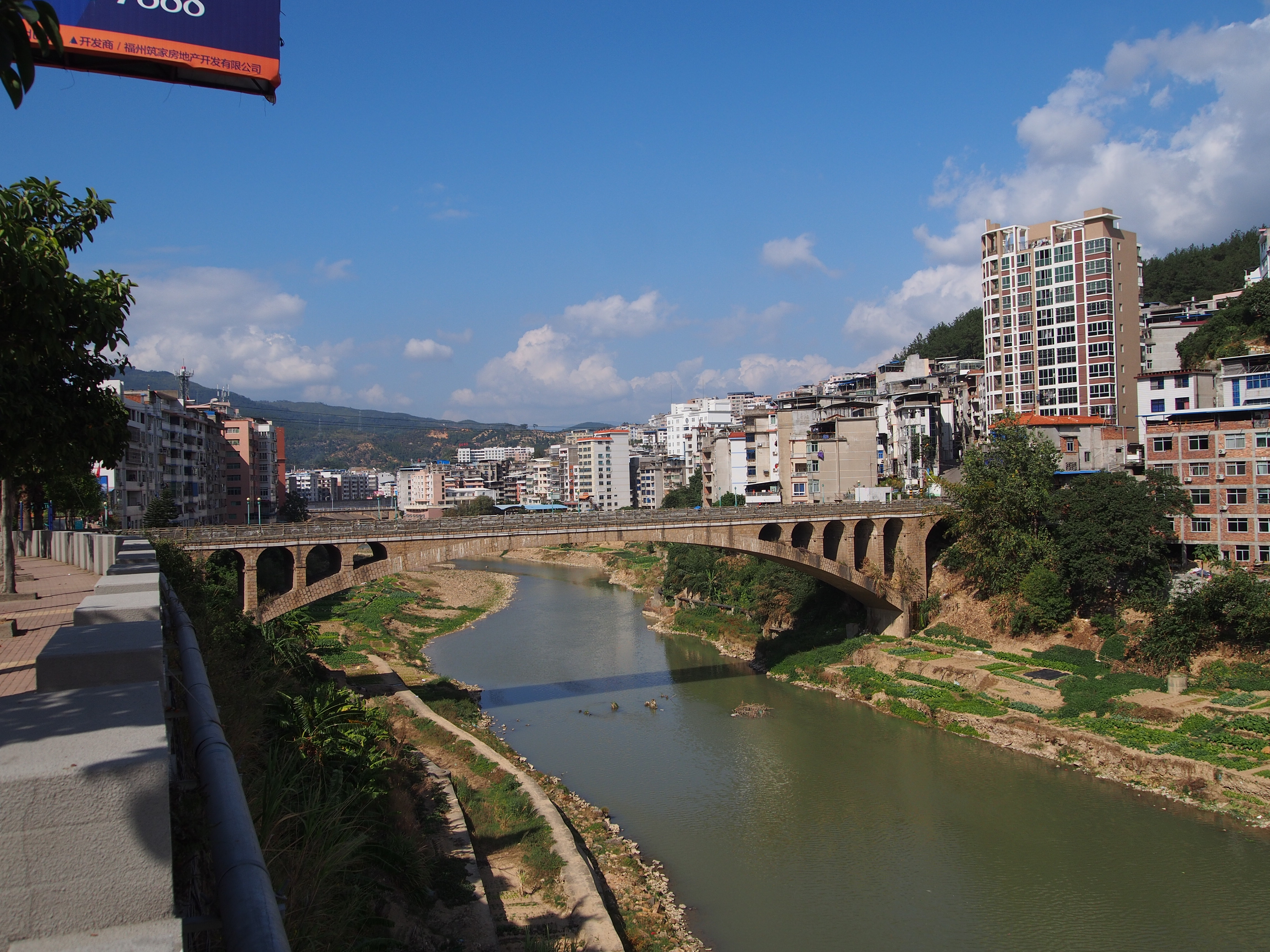

- Location in Fujian
- Coordinates: 26°13′N 118°52′E
- Country: People's Republic of China
- Province: Fujian
- Prefecture-level city: Fuzhou

Area
  - Total: 1,495 km^{2} (577 sq mi)

Population (2020)
  - Total: 256,181
  - Density: 171.4/km^{2} (443.8/sq mi)
- Time zone: UTC+8 (China Standard)

Minqing County

Chinese name
- Traditional Chinese: 閩清縣
- Simplified Chinese: 闽清县
Transcriptions
Standard Mandarin
- Hanyu Pinyin: Mǐnqīng Xiàn
- Wade–Giles: Min-ch'ing Hsien

Foochow name
- Foochow: Mìng-chiăng

Minqing County is a county in eastern Fujian Province, China. It is under the administration of the prefecture-level city of Fuzhou, the provincial capital.

== History ==
Fire from the soldiers at Meicheng (then romanized "Min-tsing") turned back an expedition by Karl Gützlaff and Edwin Stevens to explore and evangelize in Fujian's tea country in 1835.

== Division ==
Minqing County includes the towns of Meicheng (梅城镇), Bandong (坂东镇), Chiyuan (池园镇), Meixi (梅溪镇), Baizhang (白樟镇), Baizhong (白中镇), Tazhuang (塔庄镇), Dongqiao (东桥镇), Xiongjiang (雄江镇), Jinsha (金沙镇), and Shenghuang (省璜镇) and the townships of Yunlong (云龙乡), Shanglian (上莲乡), Sanxi (三溪乡), Xiazhu (下祝乡), and Kulin (桔林乡).

== Climate ==
Climate data for Minqing, elevation 41 m (135 ft), (1991–2020 normals, extremes 1981–2010)
Month	Jan	Feb	Mar	Apr	May	Jun	Jul	Aug	Sep	Oct	Nov	Dec	Year
Record high °C (°F)	28.2 (82.8)	31.9 (89.4)	36.3 (97.3)	36.7 (98.1)	38.6 (101.5)	39.2 (102.6)	42.3 (108.1)	40.7 (105.3)	39.9 (103.8)	36.3 (97.3)	33.6 (92.5)	28.5 (83.3)	42.3 (108.1)
Mean daily maximum °C (°F)	16.2 (61.2)	17.6 (63.7)	20.4 (68.7)	25.3 (77.5)	28.9 (84.0)	31.9 (89.4)	35.3 (95.5)	34.6 (94.3)	32.0 (89.6)	27.8 (82.0)	23.2 (73.8)	18.3 (64.9)	26.0 (78.7)
Daily mean °C (°F)	11.3 (52.3)	12.4 (54.3)	15.0 (59.0)	19.7 (67.5)	23.5 (74.3)	26.7 (80.1)	29.3 (84.7)	28.8 (83.8)	26.6 (79.9)	22.3 (72.1)	17.9 (64.2)	13.1 (55.6)	20.6 (69.0)
Mean daily minimum °C (°F)	8.0 (46.4)	9.0 (48.2)	11.3 (52.3)	15.7 (60.3)	19.7 (67.5)	23.1 (73.6)	25.0 (77.0)	24.8 (76.6)	22.7 (72.9)	18.2 (64.8)	14.2 (57.6)	9.5 (49.1)	16.8 (62.2)
Record low °C (°F)	−2.4 (27.7)	−2.1 (28.2)	−2.3 (27.9)	5.2 (41.4)	9.2 (48.6)	13.3 (55.9)	20.2 (68.4)	19.3 (66.7)	13.6 (56.5)	6.3 (43.3)	1.2 (34.2)	−4.1 (24.6)	−4.1 (24.6)
Average precipitation mm (inches)	56.1 (2.21)	78.8 (3.10)	131.6 (5.18)	155.8 (6.13)	199.9 (7.87)	260.8 (10.27)	156.7 (6.17)	168.3 (6.63)	123.9 (4.88)	45.8 (1.80)	52.2 (2.06)	42.7 (1.68)	1,472.6 (57.98)
Average precipitation days (≥ 0.1 mm)	9.8	12.6	16.2	15.6	17.0	17.5	12.3	15.1	10.6	6.6	8.1	8.3	149.7
Average snowy days	0.1	0.1	0	0	0	0	0	0	0	0	0	0.1	0.3
Average relative humidity (%)	73	74	74	74	76	79	73	75	73	71	74	73	74
Mean monthly sunshine hours	98.1	89.8	99.6	115.8	127.6	131.9	219.1	197.9	168.8	154.0	118.7	109.7	1,631
Percentage possible sunshine	30	28	27	30	31	32	52	49	46	43	37	34	37
Source: China Meteorological Administration

== Transportation ==
The county is served by Minqing North railway station on the Hefei–Fuzhou high-speed railway. The Nanping–Fuzhou railway passes through the county but there is no passenger service. The last passenger station, Minqing railway station, was closed in 2016.
