= Stronach =

Stronach may refer to:

- Stronach (surname)
- Iselsberg-Stronach, a municipality in Tyrol, Austria
- Stronach Township, Michigan, U.S.
- Stronach Group, a gambling and horse racing company in North America
- Stronach Stables, a North American Thoroughbred horse racing arm
- Team Stronach, a defunct political party in Austria
- Stronachlachar, a hamlet in Scotland
