= Edwin Stevens (missionary) =

19th-century American Protestant missionary to Qing China

Edwin Stevens (August 1802 – January 5, 1837) was an American Congregationalist chaplain and a Protestant missionary to Qing China who is primarily remembered for his unintentional influence on Hong Xiuquan.

== Life ==
Stevens was born in August 1802 (Note: The Missionary Herald mistakenly gives 1801.) in New Canaan, Connecticut. He attended Yale College (1824–1828) and Yale Divinity School (1829–1832), (Note: The YDS was known at the time as the Theological Seminary in New Haven, but should not be confused with the General Theological Seminary, which left New Haven in 1822, or the Berkeley Divinity School, which was not founded until 1854.) serving as a teacher and principal at a school in Aurora, New York, in between. While at Yale, he befriended Peter Parker, who later became a medical missionary to Guangdong; in April 1832, while at its seminary, he accepted appointment as the American Seamen's Friend Society's chaplain at Guangzhou (then romanized "Canton"). He was one of three foreign missionaries sent out by the ASFS around that time, along with John Diell to Honolulu in the Kingdom of Hawaii and F.S. Mines to Marseille, France.

Ordained as a minister on June 7, he received $376.19 in donations from the New Haven ASFS to help pay his way and a further $50 from its United Society's Missionary Association to print tracts and Bibles in China. He travelled to Philadelphia and left aboard the Morrison on June 29, and, despite falling ill through the first half of his journey, arrived off Nei Lingding ("Lintin"), the oceanic anchorage for ships entering or leaving Guangzhou, on October 24. He reached Guangzhou two days later. (Note: His voyage is variously reported as 116 or 119 days depending upon whether its two parts are combined or not. The Missionary Herald gives an erroneous arrival date in November.)

He succeeded David Abeel as the ASFS's chaplain at Huangpu ("Whampoa") on what is now Pazhou. At the time, there were 42 ships at Whampoa, with about 2000 Britons, Americans, and Dutch, all of whom were generally limited to the three islands of Pazhou ("Whampoa"), Xiaoguwei ("French Island"), and Changzhou ("Dane's Island"). There were also another 20 ships and 900 seamen at Nei Lingding. Stevens also served as a chaplain to the foreigners resident at Guangzhou's Thirteen Factories trading ghetto and worked under a special arrangement which also placed him under the supervision of the American Board of Commissioners for Foreign Missions. He worked with the ABCFM's missionary Elijah Bridgman and printer Samuel Wells Williams until 1836. The three welcomed Peter Parker at his arrival on 26 October 1834. Stevens learned some Chinese and wrote essays published in the Chinese Repository.

He was among the dozen members of the Christian Union of Canton, which Bridgman and Robert Morrison consulted prior to their January 1835 call for more missionaries for China. In defiance of Qing laws, Stevens repeatedly made voyages along China's coast. In March 1834 or April 14 or May 1835, he travelled with Karl Gützlaff and Gordon from Nei Lingding on the brig Governor Findlay. They intended to explore the Min River's Wuyi Range ("Bohea Hills") in search of its high-quality tea to transplant to British India, while he looked at the prospects for evangelization in China's interior. Reaching the river's mouth on May 6, they transferred to the ship's boat to travel upriver. They passed Fuzhou ("Foochow") but, on May 11, were fired upon from both banks of the river by the garrison at Meicheng ("Min-tsing"). They reached the Governor Findlay on the 13th and returned to Macao, (Note: Lutz reports that they were lost without a native pilot and, using an outdated map by Du Halde, ran aground while attempting to avoid Fuzhou. Requiring assistance from the local military, they were surrounded by warships and shunned by villages along their route, with attempts to sail free of their escort encountering storms, rapids, sandbars, and gunfire.) having gotten about 70 miles (113 km) upriver and procured some Wuyi seeds. Stevens felt the expedition would "go to prove that the interior of China cannot be traversed with impunity by foreigners. The erection of new, and the repairing of old, forts, and the garrisoning of deserted military stations, all indicate a sort of indefinite apprehension of danger from abroad. The vigilance of the imperial officers in the interior forbids the hope that a foreigner can penetrate far without detection". He noted, however, that millions of coastal Chinese could be visited by missionaries briefly.

On 26 August 1835, he joined the LMS missionary Walter Medhurst on a two-month tour and survey of the coast as far north as Shandong aboard D.W.C. Olyphant's brig Huron. The pair passed out around 18,000 books and tracts while encountering varying levels of interest and hostility. As did Gützlaff before them, they found curiosity and eagerness for books when officials were not present, coolness when they were, and increasing animosity as the imperial government became aware of the voyage and exerted pressure on the area's mandarins, particularly to block Stevens and Medhurst's attempts to travel inland. They returned to Nei Lingding on October 31.

Stevens also joined George Tradescant Lay on the Himmaleh on another, less successful coastal tour, despite the Huron voyage having prompted the imperial council to issue mandates to the coastal viceroys to strenuously oppose any more such expeditions.

Stevens became directly affiliated with the ABCFM's work among the Chinese on 7 July 1835 or March 1836. After the Chinese convert and missionary Liang Fa began distributing tracts with Qu Ya'ang to the candidates attempting the prefectural and provincial examinations, Stevens joined Liang in missionizing at the Guangzhou testing grounds. He is generally believed to have been the foreign missionary who gave Hong Xiuquan his copy of Liang Fa's 1832 Good Words to Admonish the Age after his second failed imperial examination in Guangzhou. Its ideas were later adapted by Hong in his preaching of an idiosyncratic form of Christianity which led to the decade’s-long Taiping Rebellion of the 1850s and '60s.

On 3 December 1836, he departed Macao with George Tradescant Lay on the Himmaleh to explore the prospects for evangelization on Borneo and through the Indonesian islands (the "Indian archipelago"). They reached Singapore on the 15th but Stevens contracted an "intermittent fever" which forced him to remain there. He died on January 5, 1837.

== Works ==
Stevens wrote "a good deal" for various periodicals in the United States and China, chiefly for the Chinese Repository. Among his works are:

- "Address to Masters, Officers, and Sailors in the Port of Canton", 1833.
- "Sketch of the Life and Labours of Dr Milne", Chinese Repository, Vol. I.
- "Account of Formosa", Chinese Repository, Vol. II.
- "Obituary of Dr Morrison", "History of Chinese Pirates", & "On the Propagation of the Gospel in China", Chinese Repository, Vol. III.
- "Expedition to the Bohea (Wooe) Hills: Arrival in the River Min; Passage of the Capital, Fuhchow Foo; Communication with a Military Officer; Approach to Mintsing Heën; Assailed from an Ambush; Return; Distribution of Books", The Chinese Repository, Vol. IV, No. 2, Guangzhou, June 1835, pp. 82–96.
- "Voyage of the Huron: Rounds the Promontory of Shan-tung; Transactions in the Harbor of Weihae Wei, of Keshau So, on the South Side of the Promontory, at Shanghae, at the Chu-san Group, at the Nanjeih (Lamyet) Islands, and in Tungshan (Tangsoa) Bay", The Chinese Repository, Vol. IV, No. 7, November 1835, pp. 308–335.
- "Account of Assam", Chinese Repository, Vol. V.
- "Extracts from a Letter of Mr. Stevens, Dated at Canton, June 2d, 1835", The Missionary Herald, Vol. XXXII, No. 2, Boston: Crocker & Brewster, 1836a, pp. 57–59.
- "Attempts to Penetrate the Eastern Provinces of China", The Missionary Herald, Vol. XXXII, No. 2, 1836b, pp. 75–80.
