= Minqing railway station =

Railway station in Fuzhou, Fujian

Minqing 闽清
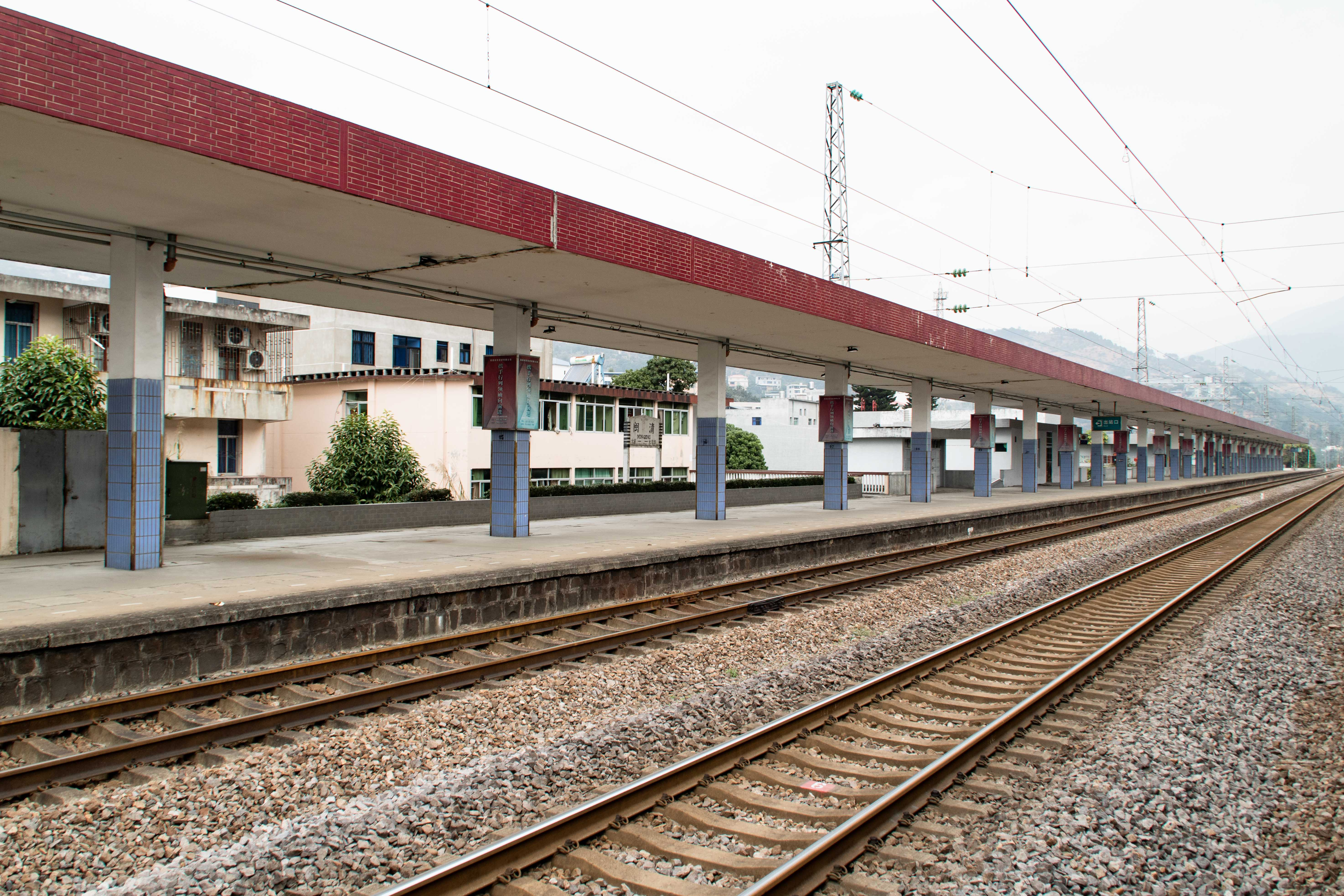

General information
- Location: Minqing County, Fuzhou, Fujian; China
- Coordinates: 26.216137°N 118.903520°E
- Line(s): Nanping–Fuzhou railway

History
- Opened: 1959
- Closed: May 16, 2016

Minqing railway station (Chinese: 闽清站) is a railway station in Minqing County, Fuzhou, Fujian, China. It is an intermediate stop on the Nanping–Fuzhou railway. The station is currently used for freight handling only, but it previously handled passenger services.

== History ==
The railway station opened in 1959. Passenger transportation ended on 15 May 2016. Passengers were advised to use Minqing North railway station instead.
