= St. Margaret's Secondary School =

St. Margaret's School (Secondary)
- 圣玛格烈中学; Sekolah Menengah St Margaret

Location
- 111 Farrer Road; Singapore 259240; Singapore; 1.3201°N 103.8095°E

Information
- Type: Government-Aided; Autonomous
- Motto: Charity. Patience. Devotion
- Religious affiliation: Anglican
- Founded: 1842; 184 years ago
- Founder: Maria Dyer
- Principal: Linda Lim
- Gender: Female
- Colour: Green White
- Affiliations: St. Margaret's School (Primary); Saint Andrew's Junior College
- Website: stmargaretssec.moe.edu.sg

St. Margaret's School (Secondary) (SMSS) is a government-aided autonomous girls' secondary school in Bukit Timah, in central Singapore, under the purview of the Anglican Diocese of Singapore. It is the first girls' school in Singapore and often regarded as the oldest existing girls' school in Southeast Asia.

== History ==
St. Margaret's School is the oldest girls' school in Singapore. It was founded in 1842 by Maria Dyer, a missionary of the London Missionary Society. The school started off from a shophouse located at North Bridge Road. In 1853 the Society for Promotion of Female Education in the East sent Sophia Cooke to Singapore to become the Principal of Chinese Girls' School. Cooke would use her influence to persuade the Anglican chaplain to begin a mission there. The society paid Cooke's salary but she had to rely on fund raising to keep the school viable. She arranged for Christian services to be conducted in Chinese in the school grounds. During Cooke's tenure as the principal of the school, the school was known as Miss Cooke's School.

In 1900, the Church of England Zenana Missionary Society took over the school and renamed the school after itself as Church of England Zenana Missionary (CEZMS) School.

In 1949, the Bishop of Singapore, Reverend Leonard Wilson renamed it to St. Margaret's School in 1949 after Queen Margaret of Scotland.

The secondary section was split from the primary in 1960 and it moved into new premises along Farrer Road.

On 16 November 2022, the school announced that it will be renamed to St. Margaret's School (Secondary) from 1 January 2023.

== Identity & culture ==
=== Uniform ===
The school's uniform, a white blouse with a green pinafore, was introduced in 1946. In 1974, principal Liza M. George wanted a more distinctive look and held a design competition for a new uniform. Art teacher Lim Kah Pheck won the competition with the green polka-dot dress.

The school uniform is a one-piece dress which features a dark green polka-dotted top, a dark green skirt up to knee length and a dark green school tie with the school logo pinned at the bottom. There are also separate PE shorts, a shirt with different colours depending on different houses and a CCA skirt. White school socks with or without the SMSS logo can be worn. A name tag is worn. The only jacket allowed is the black school jacket or any plain black jacket, and earrings are restricted to plain studs of green, white, black, gold or silver. Hair accessories can only be dark green, white and black. Despite this, coloured top undergarments are not allowed - only white or nude colours are permissible.

== Affiliation ==
St. Margaret's Secondary School is affiliated with St. Margaret's Primary School (SMPS) and Saint Andrew's Junior College (SAJC).

== Academic information ==
Being a non-special programme secondary school, St. Margaret's Secondary School offers three academic streams, namely the four-year Express course, as well as the Normal Course, comprising Normal (Academic) and Normal (Technical) academic tracks.

=== O Level Express Course ===
The Express Course is a nationwide four-year programme that leads up to the Singapore-Cambridge G.C.E. Ordinary Level examination.

==== Academic subjects ====
The examinable academic subjects for Singapore-Cambridge G.C.E. Ordinary Level offered by the school for upper secondary level (via. streaming in secondary 2 level), as of 2017, are listed below.

Notes:

1. Subjects indicated with ' * ' are mandatory subjects.
2. All students in Singapore are required to undertake a Mother Tongue Language as an examinable subject, as indicated by ' ^ '

Sciences	Language & Humanities	Arts & Aesthetics
Additional Mathematics; Mathematics*; Physics; Chemistry; Biology; Science (Combined)	English Language*; English Literature; Mother Tongue Language* ^; Higher Mother Tongue Language; Geography; History; Combined Humanities (Social Studies & another Humanities subject at elective level)*; Principles of Accounts	Art; Design & Technology; Drama; Food & Nutrition; Music

=== Normal Course ===
The Normal Course is a nationwide 4-year programme leading to the Singapore-Cambridge GCE Normal Level examination, which runs either the Normal (Academic) curriculum or Normal (Technical) curriculum, abbreviated as N(A) and N(T) respectively.

==== Normal (Academic) Course ====
In the Normal (Academic) course, students offer 5-8 subjects in the Singapore-Cambridge GCE Normal Level examination. Compulsory subjects include:

- English Language
- Mother Tongue Language
- Mathematics
- Combined Humanities

A 5th year leading to the Singapore-Cambridge GCE Ordinary Level examination is available to Normal (Academic) curriculum students who perform well in their Singapore-Cambridge GCE Normal Level examination. Students can move from one course to another based on their performance and the assessment of the school principal and teachers.

==== Normal (Technical) Course ====
The Normal (Technical) course prepares students for a technical-vocational education at the Institute of Technical Education. Students will offer 5-7 subjects in the Singapore-Cambridge GCE Normal Level examination. The curriculum is tailored towards strengthening students’ proficiency in English and Mathematics. Students take English Language, Mathematics, Basic Mother Tongue and Computer Applications as compulsory subjects.

== Notable alumni ==
- Lee Lin Chin, TV Newsreader and presenter, SBS-TV, Sydney, Australia
- Eunice Olsen: former Nominated Member of Parliament; television presenter
- Daphne Khoo: singer
- Elizabeth Choy:wartime heroine of Singapore
