= Meicheng, Fujian =

Town in Fujian, China

- Traditional Chinese: 梅城鎮
- Simplified Chinese: 梅城镇
- Literal meaning: Plum City Town
Transcriptions
Standard Mandarin
- Hanyu Pinyin: Méichéng Zhèn
- Wade–Giles: Mei-ch'eng Chen

Meicheng is a town in Minqing County in northwestern Fuzhou Municipality, Fujian Province, in the People's Republic of China.

== History ==
Fire from the soldiers at Meicheng (then romanized "Min-tsing" from its role as the seat of Minqing County) turned back an expedition by Karl Gützlaff and Edwin Stevens to explore and evangelize in Fujian's tea country in 1835.

== See also ==
- List of township-level divisions of Fujian
