= Society for Promotion of Female Education in the East =

The Society for Promotion of Female Education in the East was a British Protestant Christian missionary society that was involved in sending workers to China during the late Qing dynasty and to other Asian countries. The society was at work in Nazareth in Ottoman Palestine in the latter half of the 19th century. The society published, from 1854, the Female Missionary Intelligencer, a monthly periodical.

== Singapore ==
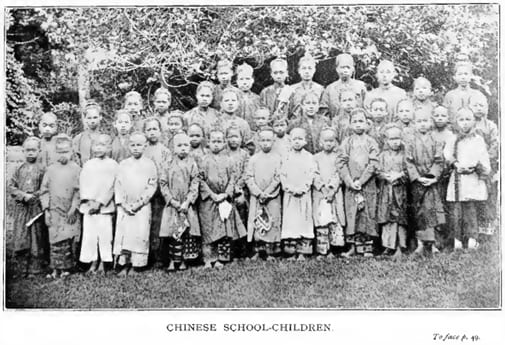
Children at the "Chinese Girls' School" in the 1890s

The society sent Sophia Cooke to Singapore to lead the "Chinese Girls' School" there in 1853. Cooke would use her influence to persuade the Anglican chaplain to begin a mission there. The school would eventually become the St. Margaret's Secondary School. The society paid Cooke's salary but she had to rely on fund raising to keep the school viable. She arranged for Christian services to be conducted in Chinese in the school grounds.

== Nazareth ==
In Nazareth is the English Hospital, a well-built structure; outside the town, halfway up the summit of the range, a very large orphanage was being built in 1875 for the Society for Promotion of Female Education in the East. This building is currently the St Margaret's Hospice for women a sort of hostel.

== Archives ==
Records of the Society for Promoting Female Education in the East are held at the Cadbury Research Library at the University of Birmingham.

== See also ==
- Women's missionary societies
