= Liang Fa =

Chinese missionary

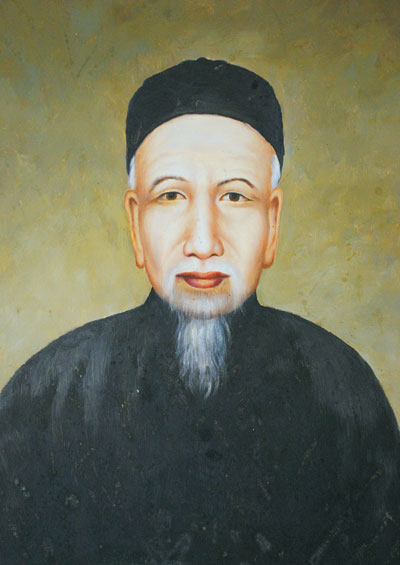
- A posthumous portrait (c. 1865)
- Traditional Chinese: 梁發
- Simplified Chinese: 梁发
Transcriptions
Standard Mandarin
- Hanyu Pinyin: Liáng Fā
Yue: Cantonese
- Jyutping: Leung4 Faat3

Liang Gongfa
- Traditional Chinese: 梁恭發
- Simplified Chinese: 梁恭发
Transcriptions
Standard Mandarin
- Hanyu Pinyin: Liáng Gōngfā

Liang A-fa
- Traditional Chinese: 梁阿發
- Simplified Chinese: 梁阿发
Transcriptions
Standard Mandarin
- Hanyu Pinyin: Liáng Āfā

Student of the Good
- Traditional Chinese: 學善(者)
- Simplified Chinese: 学善(者)
Transcriptions
Standard Mandarin
- Hanyu Pinyin: Xuéshàn(zhě)

Retired Student of the Good
- Traditional Chinese: 學善居士
- Simplified Chinese: 学善居士
Transcriptions
Standard Mandarin
- Hanyu Pinyin: Xuéshàn Jūshì

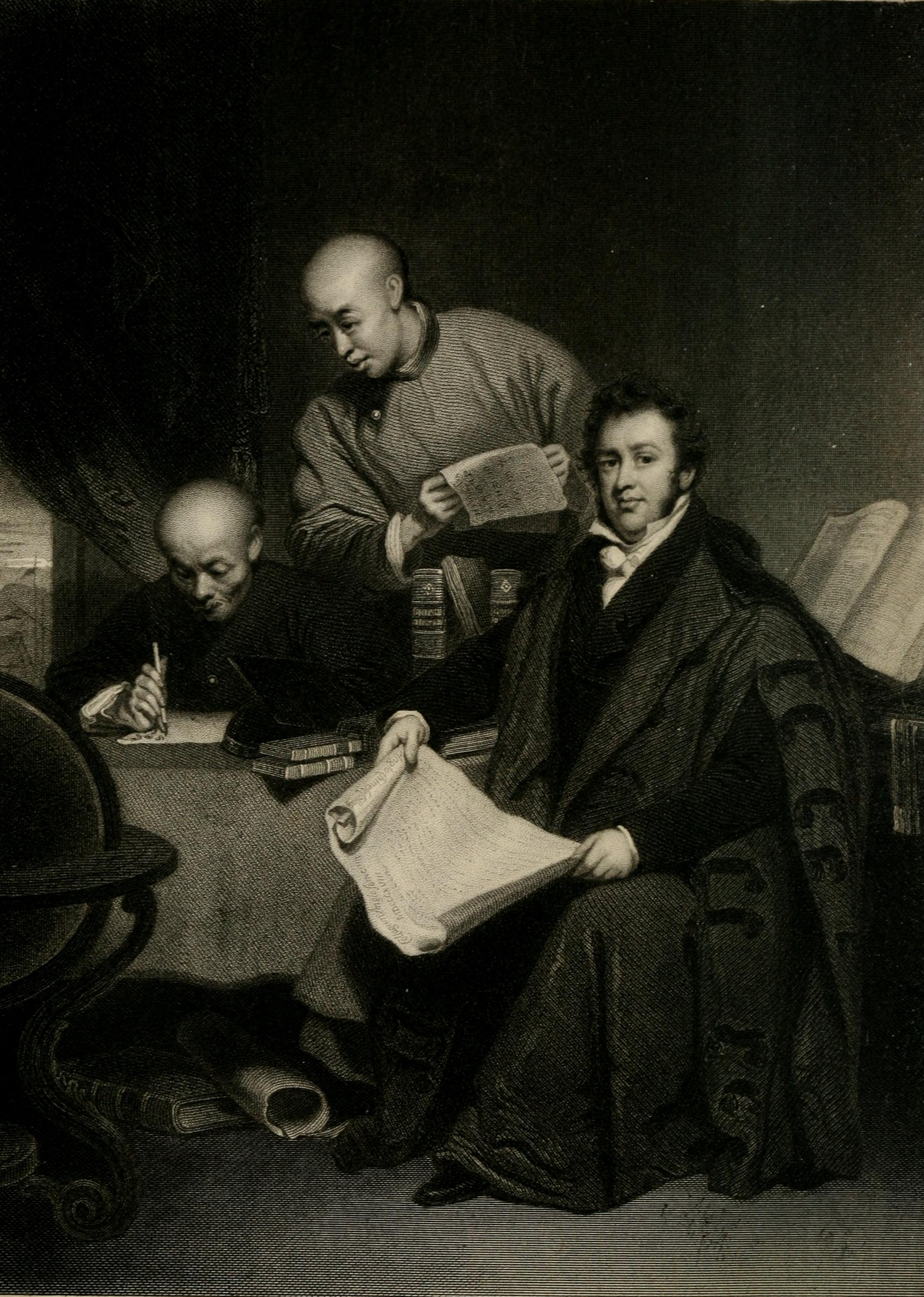
An engraving of George Chinnery's lost Robert Morrison Translating the Bible (c. 1828). Morrison is assisted by Li Shigong (left) and Chen Laoyi (right).

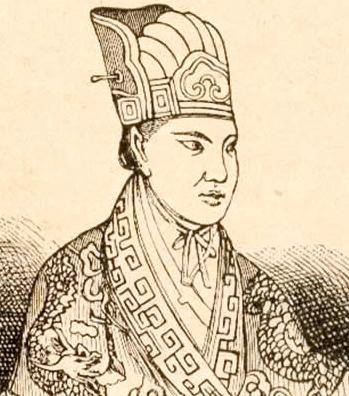
Hong Xiuquan (c. 1860).

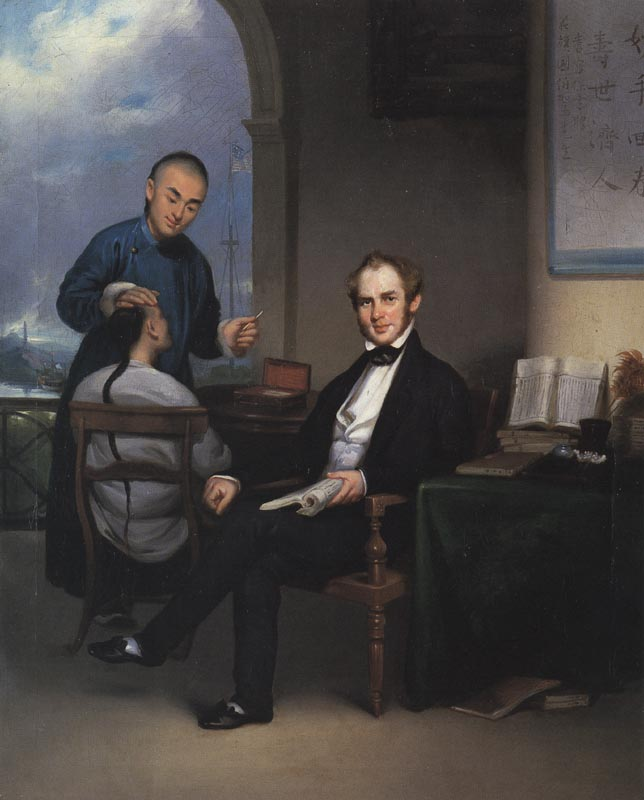
Lam Qua's portrait of Peter Parker (c. 1845).

Liang Fa (1789–1855), also known by other names, was the second Chinese Protestant convert and the first Chinese Protestant minister and evangelist. He was ordained by Robert Morrison, the first Protestant missionary in the Qing Empire. His tract Good Words to Admonish the Age was influential on Hong Xiuquan, who went on to lead the Taiping Rebellion.

== Name ==
Liang Fa is the pinyin romanization of Liang's usual Chinese name, which his father used. Leung Faat is the Jyutping romanization of the same name in Cantonese, the usual spoken dialect of Guangdong's natives. His personal name 發 is the common Chinese verb for "to send" but in Chinese grammar can also be understood as its past participle, "[he who is] sent". He is also known as Liang A-fa, "A-Fa", "Afa", "Ah Fa" or "Ah-fa" from the Southern Chinese habit of forming affectionate nicknames using the prefix Ā- (now 阿, formerly 亞). Liang Gongfa was apparently his complete name, although it was used less often. It variously appears as "Leang Kung-fa", "Leang Kung-fah", and "Leong Kung Fa".

== Life ==
Liang was born in the village of Gulao (then known as "Lohtsun"), Gaoming County, in Sanzhou ("Samchow"), Guangdong, in 1789. Although he came from a poor family, they made an effort to give him a classical Chinese education at the village school. This consisted of the Four Books, three of the Five Classics, and the Sacred Edict. They were unable to afford his schooling until he was 11; at age 15, he was compelled to seek work as a brush-maker (Note: Liang is sometimes unhelpfully described as making "pens" or wrongly said to have made "pencils".) in Guangzhou (then known as "Canton"). He soon left this to apprentice as a printer, for whom he carved characters onto wooden blocks. After four years, he left to a nearby village to ply the trade. He returned to Gulao in 1810 to mourn his mother's death and then returned to the area around Guangzhou.

In 1811 and 1812, Cai Luxing (蔡盧興, known at the time as "Tsae Low-heen") was helping Robert Morrison to publish his Chinese translation of the New Testament and in one of those years Liang began to assist in carving the work's printing blocks. An imperial edict of 1812 prohibited the publication of Christian texts in Chinese; it declared that Christianity was a menace to Chinese culture as it "neither holds spirits in veneration nor ancestors in reverence". Nonetheless, Cai's younger brother—probably named Gao—became the Protestants' first Chinese convert, baptized at a secluded seaside spring on July 16, 1814, and Liang became their second. The missionary William Milne employed Liang as his Chinese teacher and Liang went with him to the Malacca mission in April 1815 to assist him with printing his Chinese-language tracts. At his request, he was baptized by Milne at noon on November 3, 1816, so that there would be no shadows present. He adopted the pen name "Student of the Good".

Liang returned to China in April 1819 to see his family. Under Morrison's supervision, he prepared 200 copies of a 37-page tract of Miscellaneous Exhortations for his friends and neighbors. The police reacted harshly, arresting him and burning both the copies and the printing blocks used to publish them. Morrison got him released two days later, but he had already been beaten thirty times with a bamboo cane and compelled to pay $70. He remained forty days with his family and then returned to Malacca. He returned again in 1820, successfully converting and baptizing his wife before returning to Malacca the next year.

Following Milne's death, he came home in 1823. On November 20, he had Morrison baptize his son Jinde ("Tsin-tih"). A month later, Morrison appointed him as a lay evangelist for the London Missionary Society (Note: This date is sometimes confused—as by Lee—with the date of his full ordination.) and in 1827 ordained him as a full minister, the first native Chinese to do so. He preached at hospitals and chapels and, after writing his own tracts, thought to distribute Christian literature to the scholars gathered for the prefectural and provincial imperial exams. He printed 7,000 or 70,000 tracts in a single year and personally distributed them to the thousands who came for the tests in Guangzhou and in the prefectural seats of Guangdong. It was at one such session that Hong Xiuquan first encountered Liang's work Good Words to Admonish the Age. He converted a printer named Lin ("Lam"); Li San, who became his assistant; and others. Liang accompanied Wat Ngong, another Chinese Christian printer, on his 250-mile (402 km) trek in 1830, distributing their Christian tracts across southwest Guangdong. He continued the practice for three or four more years. There are unclear references to some long-standing dispute between Wat and Liang that was eventually resolved; they worked together in Malacca and again to continue the mission with another native worker after Morrison's death.

The 1833 Government of India Act ended the East India Company's legal monopoly on Britain's share of the Canton trade. Amid the diplomatic crisis occasioned by the increase in opium smuggling and Lord Napier's resort to force to assert his right to act as the British consul in Guangzhou, the Emperor personally expressed disbelief that westerners were responsible for the Chinese-language magazines and broadsides being distributed by the English. Qing subjects were forbidden to teach to the language, and a crackdown was ordered. Morrison died in August 1834 and, several days into Liang's distribution of tracts at Guangzhou's provincial exams a few weeks later, the city's police came for him and his companions. Liang escaped to Macao, (Note: Wylie mistakenly records that Liang Fa was among those arrested.) but an assistant in Guangzhou and several family members in Sanzhou were seized. Unlike his father, John Morrison helped Liang by paying the $800 for the ten captives himself.

He again left for Malacca with his son Lou. He was formally attached to the London mission there in 1837 and, while working there with Wat Ngong, caused a "spike" in conversions, netting more than thirty converts in a span of months. When many of these new converts later abandoned the faith, it prompted disputes within the LMS about the meaning and requirements for baptism. Liang moved to the mission at Singapore the next year. He finally returned to China in July 1839. He then joined Peter Parker's missionary hospital on Hog Lane in Guangzhou's Thirteen Factories trading ghetto. At an 1841 congressional hearing in Washington, Parker quoted Liang as saying "When I meet men in the streets and villages and tell them the folly of worshipping idols they laugh at me. Their hearts are very hard. But when men are sick and are healed their hearts are very soft". For similar reasons, he opposed Britain's persecution of the First Opium War, saying its support of opium smugglers and assaults on China would turn its people against Christianity in general and British missionaries in particular. In 1845, Liang became the hospital's chaplain, leading regular services and visiting patients. Parker noted him often sharing his conversion story and scriptural passages.

Liang helped Robert Morrison's son-in-law Benjamin Hobson locate a residence and establish his clinic in Guangzhou's western suburbs in 1848. Liang then moved his work there, since it began to treat more than two hundred patients daily. Four men and six women joined him for services, but more than a hundred might watch their ceremony. He baptized Hok Chau, who worked at the hospital illustrating Hobson's medical treatises, in 1852; Chau later went on to succeed Liang as minister there.

He was unhappy with his son Jinde's government job, which required him to work on Sundays. He also had a daughter (b. 1829) and a third child, who died in 1832.

He died on 12 April 1855.

== Works ==
Liang Fa wrote under the pen name "Student of the Good" or "Retired Student of the Good".

He is primarily remembered for his Quànshì Liángyán (t 《勸世良言》, s 《劝世良言》), formerly romanized as K'euen She Lëang Yen and Ch'üan-shih Liang-yen and variously translated (Note: Seitz's introduction to McNeur.) as Good Words to Admonish the Age, "Good News to Admonish the Ages", "Good News to Admonish the World", (Note: Seitz's introduction to McNeur.) "Good Words to Exhort the World", "Good Words Exhorting the Age", "Good Words Exhorting Mankind", &c. Revised by Morrison, it was printed in Guangzhou in early 1832 and in Malacca later that year. (Note: This edition was largely identical but included a five-page table of contents.) It comprised a form of the New Testament in vernacular Chinese based upon Morrison's classical Chinese translation, along with ten homilies, (Note: Seitz's introduction to McNeur.) some of Liang's tracts, an attack on Chinese religions, and his conversion story. Although often called a "tract", it was over 500 pages long in nine stand-alone chapters or scrolls (juan), (Note: Seitz's introduction to McNeur.) which appear to have often been printed in four-volume sets. It largely dwelt on the omnipotence of God the Father, the degrading nature and effects of idolatry and other sins, and the personal choice between salvation and damnation. (Note: Seitz's introduction to McNeur.) Its actual text long went unstudied since only four copies are known to have survived the suppression of the Taipings: one copy of the Malacca edition is held by the New York Public Library, one copy of the Guangzhou edition is held by Harvard University, and two more were held by the London Missionary Society. (Note: The society's records and holdings are now at the library of the School of Oriental and African Studies at the University of London. Other copies may exist within China, but the party line has held that the Taiping struggle was primarily a spontaneous class war and peasant revolt and that its religious elements were largely irrelevant, discouraging research on the topic.) A third and fourth edition, both abridged, were also printed at Singapore.

He also published: (Note: Chinese titles are given in modern traditional characters, some of which—such as those preceded by the altar radical—vary slightly from their 19th-century forms. Romanizations include both modern pinyin and the contemporary romanization. Translations are Wylie's, where given.)

- 《救世錄撮要畧解》 [Jiùshì Lù Cuōyāo Lüèxiè or Kew She Luh Tso Yaou Leo Keae, Miscellaneous Exhortations], Guangzhou: Religious Tract Society, 1819. (in Chinese)
- 《熟學聖理略論》 [Shúxué Shènglǐ Lüèlún or Shuh Heo Shing Le Lëo Lun, Perfect Acquaintance with the Holy Doctrine], Guangzhou: Religious Tract Society, 1828, (in Chinese) autobiographical & probably a second edition
- 《真道問答淺解》 [Zhēndào Wèndá Jiānxiè or Chin Taou Wan Ta Ts'ëen Keae, Simple Explanations to the Questions and Answers of the Truth], Malacca: Anglo-Chinese Press, 1829. (in Chinese)
- 《聖書日課初學便用》 [Shèngshū Rìkè Chūxué Biànyòng or Shing Shoo Jih K'o Ts'oo Hëo Pëen Yung, Scripture Lessons for the Young], Guangzhou: Religious Tract Society, 1831, reprinted 1832 by the British & Foreign School Society. (in Chinese)
- 《祈禱文贊神詩》 [Qídǎo Wén Zànshén Shī or K'e Taou Wan Tsan Shin She, Prayers and Hymns], Macao, 1833, (in Chinese) a translation of the Morning Service of Church of England, with the prayers done by Liang and the hymns by others
- 《真道尋源》 [Zhēndào Xún Yuán, Seeking the Source of the True Way].
- 《靈魂篇》 [Línghún Piān, On Souls].
- 《異端論》 [Yìduān Lún, On Heresy].

Liang also assisted Milne's Monthly Chinese Magazine and created The Monthly Total Record of the Inspection of the Worldly Customs (《察世俗每月統記傳》 Cha Shisu Meiyue Tongji Zhuan), one of the first Chinese magazines.

== Legacy ==
Liang was an important participant in the establishment of Protestantism in China, but is most remembered for the influence of his tracts on Hong Xiuquan and his Taiping rebels, for whom Good Words to Admonish the Age became a sacred text.

Liang's grave was found to be on land purchased for the expansion of Lingnan University (formerly Canton Christian College and now Sun Yat-sen University). He was re-interred in the center of the college campus on the site reserved for the college chapel. The site was dedicated 7 June 1920.

== See also ==
- Christianity and Protestantism in China
- Jesuit and Protestant China missions
- Anglo-Chinese College
