= Sacred Edict of the Kangxi Emperor =

1670 Qing dynasty imperial decree

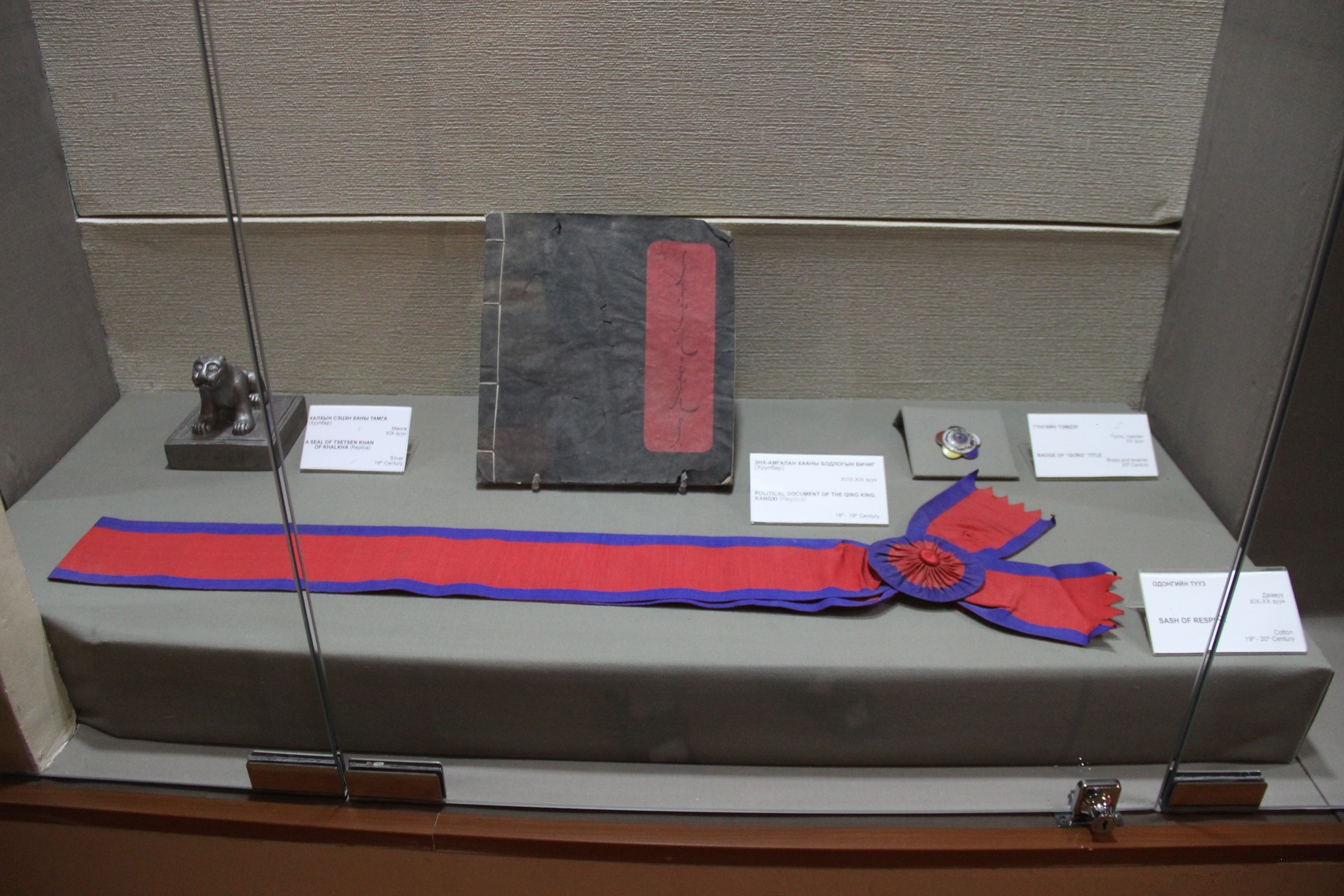
Sacred Edict of the Kangxi Emperor, Book of Manchu version in National Museum of Mongolia

In 1670, when the Kangxi Emperor of China's Qing dynasty was sixteen years old, he issued the Sacred Edict (simplified Chinese: 圣谕; traditional Chinese: 聖諭; pinyin: shèng yù), consisting of sixteen maxims, each seven characters long, to instruct the average citizen in the basic principles of Confucian orthodoxy. They were to be publicly posted in every town and village, then read aloud two times each month. Since they were written in terse formal classical Chinese, a local scholar was required to explicate them using the local dialect of the spoken language. This practice continued into the 20th century.

In 1724, the second year of his reign, the Yongzheng Emperor issued the Shengyu Guangxun (simplified Chinese: 圣谕广训; traditional Chinese: 聖諭廣訓; pinyin: shèng yù guǎng xùn; "Amplified instructions on the Sacred Edict") in 10,000 characters. Evidently worried that the seven character lines of his father’s maxims could not be understood by local people, the Yongzheng Emperor's Amplified Instructions explains "Our text attempts to be clear and precise; our words, for the most part, are direct and simple." The prose is relatively easy to understand for those with a beginning understanding of the literary language. The Amplified Instructions was also published in a Manchu translation and then in a combined Chinese, Manchu, and Mongol version.

== The Sixteen Maxims ==
1. Highly esteem filial piety and brotherly submission to give due weight to social relations (敦孝弟以重人倫);
2. Behave generously toward your family to promote harmony and peace (篤宗族以昭雍睦);
3. Cultivate peace within the neighborhood to prevent quarrels and lawsuits (和鄉黨以息爭訟);
4. Respect farming and the cultivation of mulberry trees to ensure sufficient clothing and food (重農桑以足衣食);
5. Be moderate and economical in order to avoid wasting away your livelihood (尚節儉以惜財用);
6. Give weight to schools and academies in order to honor the scholar (隆學校以端士習);
7. Wipe out strange beliefs to elevate the correct doctrine (黜異端以崇正學);
8. Elucidate the laws in order to warn the ignorant and obstinate (講法律以儆愚頑);
9. Show propriety and tactful courtesy to elevate customs and manners (明禮讓以厚民俗);
10. Work diligently in your chosen callings to quiet your ambitions (務本業以定民志);
11. Instruct sons and younger brothers to keep them from doing wrong (訓子弟以禁非為);
12. Hold back false accusations to safeguard the good and honest (息誣告以全善良);
13. Warn against sheltering deserters lest you share their punishment (誡匿逃以免株連);
14. Promptly and fully pay your taxes lest you need be pressed to pay them (完錢糧以省催科);
15. Join together in hundreds and tithings to end theft and robbery (聯保甲以弭盜賊);
16. Free yourself from enmity and anger to show respect for your body and life (解仇忿以重身命).

The village lecturer might point out that #7 the “strange beliefs” included shamanic, Buddhist, and Taoist beliefs which many villagers did not regard as at all strange, though they might agree with the edict on the strangeness of Christianity. They would not need to be told that the mulberry mentioned in #4 was fed to silk worms.

== Background ==
By the reign of the Kangxi Emperor there was a long tradition for the explanation of imperial edicts in popular language. Systematic village lectures began at least as early as the Song dynasty, when Confucian scholars expounded the virtues of cooperation and self-cultivation to neighborhood audiences.

The Hongwu Emperor, founder of the Ming dynasty, wrote the Six Maxims which inspired the Sacred Edict of the Kangxi Emperor,

Be filial to your parents
Be respectful to your elders.
Live in harmony with your neighbors.
Instruct your sons and grandsons.
Be content with your calling.
Do no evil.

== Printed versions and amplifications ==
Following the publication of the original edicts, several versions in the Chinese vernacular were published, some with detailed commentaries or illustrations. The most widely popular was the Shengyu guangxun zhijie (Direct explanation of the Amplified Instructions on the Sacred Edict) by Wang Youpu (王又樸 1680-1761), a jinshi scholar and official. Like Yongzheng’s Amplified Instructions, it was meant to be read to the people, but not to be read aloud word for word. It might have been difficult to understand the lecturer if the audience spoke local languages, and for him to elaborate in their dialect.

Wang Youpu not only interpreted the maxims in more understandable language, he explained them with stories and anecdotes. He might begin by saying “Let all of you — scholars, farmers, artisans, merchants, and soldiers — take care in practicing ceremonial deference. If one place becomes good, then many places will become so, and finally the entire realm will be in excellent harmony. Won’t we then have a world in perfect concord?”

Then he might go on:

Formerly there was a Wang Yanfang who was exceptionally ready to defer to others. Once a cattle thief, when captured, said, "I will willingly receive my punishment, but please don't inform Wang Yanfang." When Wang heard of this, he sent someone to give the thief a piece of cloth and persuade him to become good. From this incident the thief became so reformed that when he saw someone drop his sword in the road he stood guarding it till the owner came back to get it.

Wang would conclude:

If you are able to get along with others, those who are rude will imitate you and learn to get along. If you are able to manage business fairly, those who are dishonest will learn to be fair by following you. When one person takes the lead, all the rest will follow. When one family follows, then the whole village will do the same. From near to far, everywhere people will be good. At first it will take effort, but constant practice will make it easy. Men will become honest and popular customs pure and considerate.

== Village lectures ==
The 19th-century missionary and translator of the Sacred Edict William Milne describes the scene:

Early on the first and fifteenth of every moon, the civil and military officers, dressed in their uniform, meet in a clean, spacious, public hall. The superintendent who is called Lee-Sang (lisheng) calls aloud, "stand forth in files.” They do so, according to their rank: he then says; "kneel thrice, and bow the head nine times." They kneel, and bow to the ground, with their faces towards a platform, on which is placed a board with the Emperor's name. He next calls aloud, "rise and retire." They rise, and all go to a hall, or kind of chapel, where the law is usually read; and where military and people are assembled standing round in silence.

The Lee Sang then says, "Respectfully commence." The Sze-kian Sang [sijiangsheng or orator], advancing towards an incense-altar, kneels; reverently takes up the board on which the maxim appointed for the day is written, and ascends a stage with it. An old man receives the board, and puts it down on the stage, fronting the people. Then, commanding silence with a wooden rattle which he carries in his hand, he kneels, and reads it. When he has finished, the Lee-Sting calls out, "Explain such a section, or maxim, of the sacred edict." The orator stands up, and gives the sense. In reading and expounding other parts of the law, the same forms are also observed.

Country magistrates sent to frontier areas could use the occasion to deliver lectures to non-Han peoples on the virtues of Confucian culture. One commented on the need to expound the Edicts: "though the Yao are a different type of people, they possess a human nature. I ought to treat them with sincerity."

Many Chinese and outsiders agreed that by the 19th century, the readings had become empty ritual. Yet others respected the power of the Sacred Edicts. Guo Moruo, the Marxist and New Culture iconoclast, wrote in his autobiography that in his youth he and other villagers loved to hear the lecturer on the Sacred Edict who would come around. He set up tables with incense and candles on a street corner as offerings to the book. Then lecturer would first knock his head on the ground four times, recite the maxims, and start telling stories. Victor Mair comments that this popular form of story telling was probably more effective in spreading Confucian values than the condescending lectures of the scholars and officials.

One western scholar traveling in China in the 1870s reported that the widespread dissemination of the Sacred Edict following the mid-century Taiping Rebellion "proved a serious blow to the immediate spread of Christianity."

== Translations ==
Since the language was relatively straightforward and the significance apparent, many western students of Chinese made translations. The first appeared in 1817, by William Milne, a missionary. It included Wang Youpu's Direct Explanation, as well. The Sacred Edict; Containing Sixteen Maxims of the Emperor Kang-He (London: Black, Kingsbury, Parbury, and Allen, 1817; rpr. 1870). F.W. Baller in 1892 published The Sacred Edict: Shen Yü Kuang Hsün, with a Translation of the Colloquial Rendering 聖諭廣訓. (Shanghai; Philadelphia: China Inland Mission, 6th ed., 1924).
