= Johann Georg Bausum =

Christian Protestant missionary

Johann Georg Bausum, also known as John George Bausum, (born 8 June 1812 at Rodheim vor der Höhe, near Frankfurt am Main, Germany, died 1 Aug 1855 in Penang, Straits Settlements (today Malaysia)) was a Christian Protestant missionary.

Starting from 1837, he carried on a "flourishing school" with Chinese and Malays in Province Wellesley. When the London Missionary Society, which had been involved in educational outreach to the Chinese on Penang Island since 1819, decided to withdraw from Penang in 1844 to focus their efforts on China, Bausum stepped in to take over the educational work of the LMS mission.

== Life and mission work ==
Bausum's first marriage was to Maria Tarn Dyer, widow of Samuel Dyer, an LMS missionary, in 1845. She was an English missionary and considerably older than himself.

Samuel Dyer worked in Penang from 1827 to 1845 and then at Malacca and Singapore, and produced a "Vocabulary of the Hok-kien Dialect". Maria had three children from her first marriage, all who were born in Penang and who later became missionaries in China. Their daughter, Maria Dyer, eventually married an even more famous missionary, James Hudson Taylor, founder of the China Inland Mission.

After Dyer's death in Macao, Maria returned to Penang in 1843 to take over the LMS Chinese girls' school. Here, she met Bausum and the two married in 1845. In view of Mrs. Bausum's previous contributions as the wife of an LMS missionary, the London Missionary Society decided to allow the Bausums to make use of the property in exchange for its upkeep. Maria Bausum died in 1946, and her epithet states that "She devoted her life to the extension of Christ’s Kingdom among the Chinese females in the Straits...."

After Maria's death, Bausum married Jemima Poppy, a missionary who had come to Penang to work in women's education. The couple wed at St. Andrew's Cathedral in Singapore on 23 May 1848. The couple had four children, Mary Elizabeth (b. 15 October 1849), George Frederick (b. 20 November 1850), Samuel Gottlieb (b. 3 July 1853, d. 19 April 1854) and Louisa Jane (b. 3 March 1855, d. 9 March 1855). Bausum continued his mission in Penang, where he died of heart failure in 1855. The eldest daughter, Mary Elizabeth Bausum (1849–1926), who was born in Penang, sailed to China with the China Inland Mission in 1866 and had a long missionary career in China.

Bausum was an independent missionary and an avowed "dissenter" against the established church. As a way out of financial hardship, Bausum at different times considered working with the Episcopalians, the Presbyterians and the Anglicans, but could not come to any agreement with them or chose not to compromise his beliefs. He later received some support from the China Evangelization Society founded by the famous Charles Gützlaff. Like Gützlaff in China, Bausum in Penang carried on his one-man mission without funding or interference from any church.

In 1847, Bausum wrote to inform the LMS that he had purchased a parcel of land to expand the school at his own expense, which was intended as an addition to the girls' school, but the land was never transferred to the control of the LMS directors.

Following Bausum's death in 1855, the mission premises at Farquhar Street came under the temporary charge of one "G. Gottlieb" – the Harbour Master George Felix Gottlieb, a fellow German. His letter to the LMS in London, dated January 1860, records the arrival of the Mr. and Mrs. Chapman, whom many regard as the first Brethren missionaries in the Straits Settlements.

During Bausum's time, the Chapel became a well-known gathering place for independent Protestants and non-denominational missionaries in the region. When the LMS wanted to sell off their mission properties, G. F. Gottlieb wrote to advise that a portion of the land on which the girls' school stood now belonged to Bausum's second wife, who had since remarried and was now known as Mrs. Lord. Moreover, a group of petitioners in Penang argued that the LMS had no right to sell the properties because they in part been paid for with donations collected to support the work in Penang. In 1870, the LMS directors sold off the chapel and other properties, but the Brethren managed to hang on to the site purchased by Bausum, and built a new Chapel there in 1876.
