= Alexander Wylie (missionary) =

Missionary in China

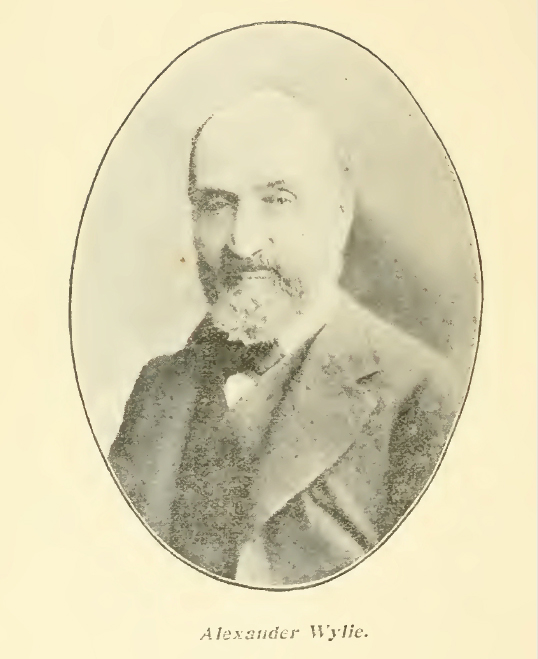
- Missionary to China
- Born: 6 April 1815; London, England
- Died: 10 February 1887 (aged 71); London, England

Alexander Wylie (Traditional Chinese: 偉烈亞力, Simplified Chinese: 伟烈亚力) (6 April 1815 – 10 February 1887), was a British Protestant Christian missionary to China. He is known for his translation work and scholarship during the late Qing Dynasty.

== Early life ==
Wylie was born in London, and went to school at Drumlithie, Kincardineshire, and at Chelsea. While apprenticed to a cabinet-maker, Wylie picked up a Chinese grammar book written in Latin (the Notitia linguae sinicae by Joseph Henri Marie de Prémare).

== China ==
After having mastered Latin, he went on to make such good progress in Chinese that, in 1846, James Legge engaged him to superintend the London Missionary Society's press in Shanghai. In this position, he acquired a wide knowledge of Chinese religion and civilisation, and especially of mathematics, enabling him to demonstrate in his paper Jottings on the Science of the Chinese that Sir George Horner's method (1819) of solving equations of all orders had been known to the Chinese mathematicians of the 14th century.

He made several journeys into the interior, notably in 1858 with Lord Elgin on a British Navy gunboat up the Yangtze and to Nanjing, where he served as one member of a delegation of three to meet with officials of the Taiping, and in 1868 with Griffith John to the capital of Sichuan and the source of the Han. He completed the distribution of one million Chinese New Testaments provided by the British and Foreign Bible Society's special fund of 1855. From 1863 he was an agent of the British and Foreign Bible Society. He was succeeded by Samuel Dyer, Junior, the son of Samuel Dyer and brother-in-law of Hudson Taylor.

In Chinese, he translated books on arithmetic, calculus (Loomis), algebra (De Morgan's), mechanics, astronomy (Herschel's), in collaboration with Li Shanlan, and The Marine Steam Engine (TJ Main and T Brown), as well as translations of the Gospel According to Matthew and the Gospel According to Mark. In English his chief works were Jottings on the Science of the Chinese, published in 1853, Shanghai; a collection of articles published under the title Chinese Researches by Alexander Wylie (Shanghai, 1897); Memorials of Protestant Missionaries (1867); Notes on Chinese Literature (Shanghai, 1867). He also published an article on the Nestorian Tablet in Xi'an.

== Retirement ==
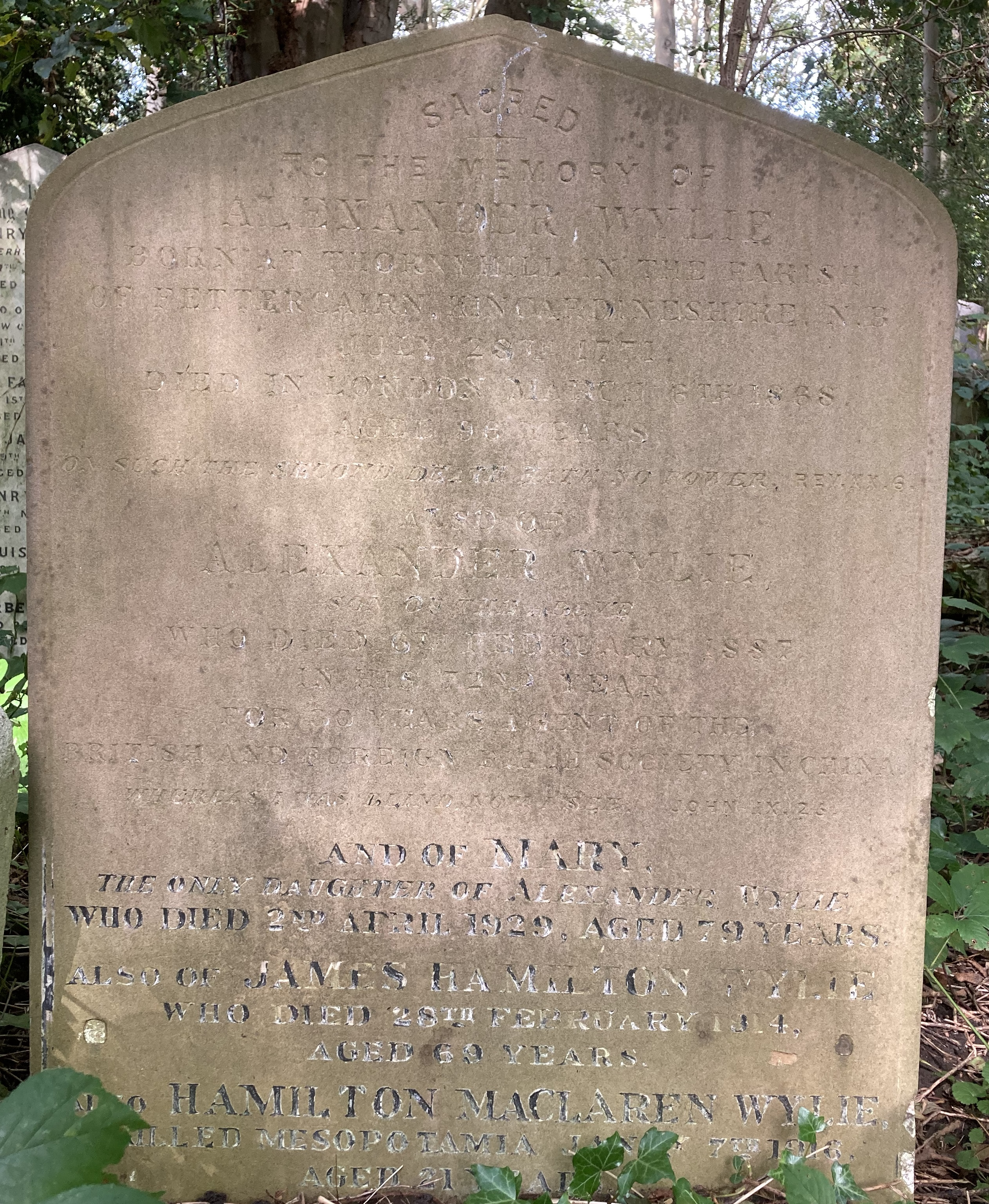
Grave of Alexander Wylie in Highgate Cemetery

His health and eyesight were failing and he returned to London in 1877. In 1881 and 1882 he sold his collection of some 500 Chinese titles to the Bodleian Library; the collection was catalogued by David Helliwell in 1985. Blind and bed-ridden, he died at his home, 18 Christchurch Road, Hampstead on 6 February 1887 and was buried on the western side of Highgate Cemetery (plot no:15429).

== Works ==
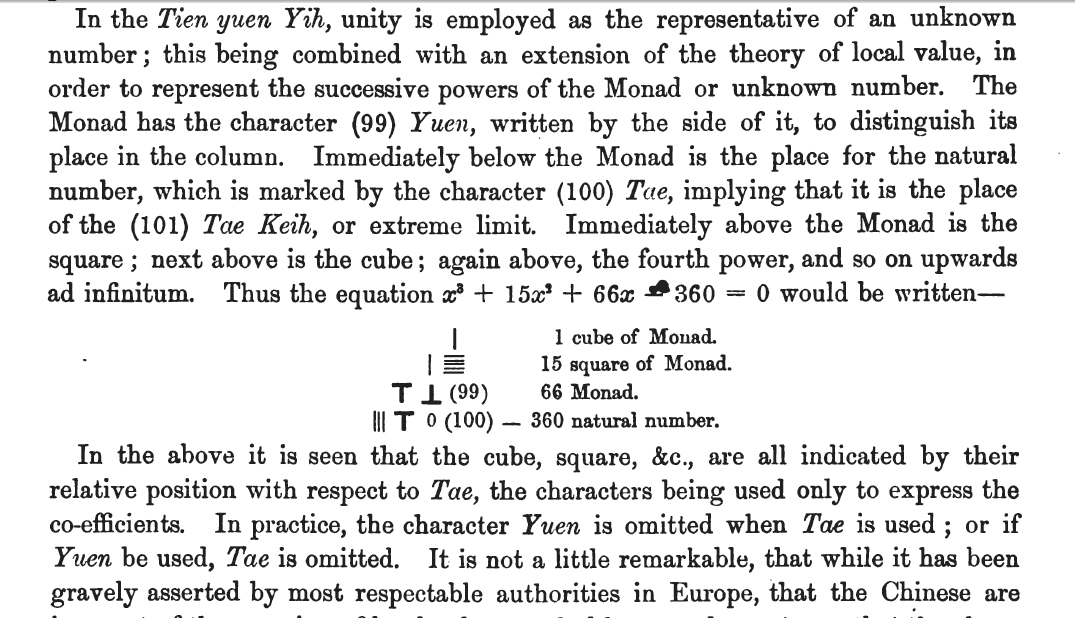
Wylie on Tian yuan shu in Jottings on the Science of the Chinese

- Alexander Wylie (1867). Memorials of Protestant missionaries to the Chinese: giving a list of their publications, and obituary notices of the deceased. With copious indexes. American Presbyterian Mission Press. p. 331.
- Alexander Wylie; Henri Cordier (1897). Chinese Researches.
- Alexander Wylie (1902). Notes on Chinese Literature: With Introductory Remarks on the Progressive Advancement of the Art; and a List of Translations from the Chinese Into Various European Languages. Printed at the American Presbyterian mission Press.

== See also ==
- Protestantism in Sichuan
- List of London Missionary Society missionaries in China
