= Alexander Stronach =

Alexander Stronach was a Protestant Christian missionary who served with the London Missionary Society during the late Qing Dynasty in China.
