= John Stronach =

John Stronach (1810-1888), younger brother of Alexander Stronach, was a Protestant Christian missionary who served with the London Missionary Society during the late Qing Dynasty China, working primarily at Xiamen [Amoy]. Stronach participated in the translation of the Bible into Chinese.
