= William Milne (missionary) =

Protestant missionary to China (1785–1822)

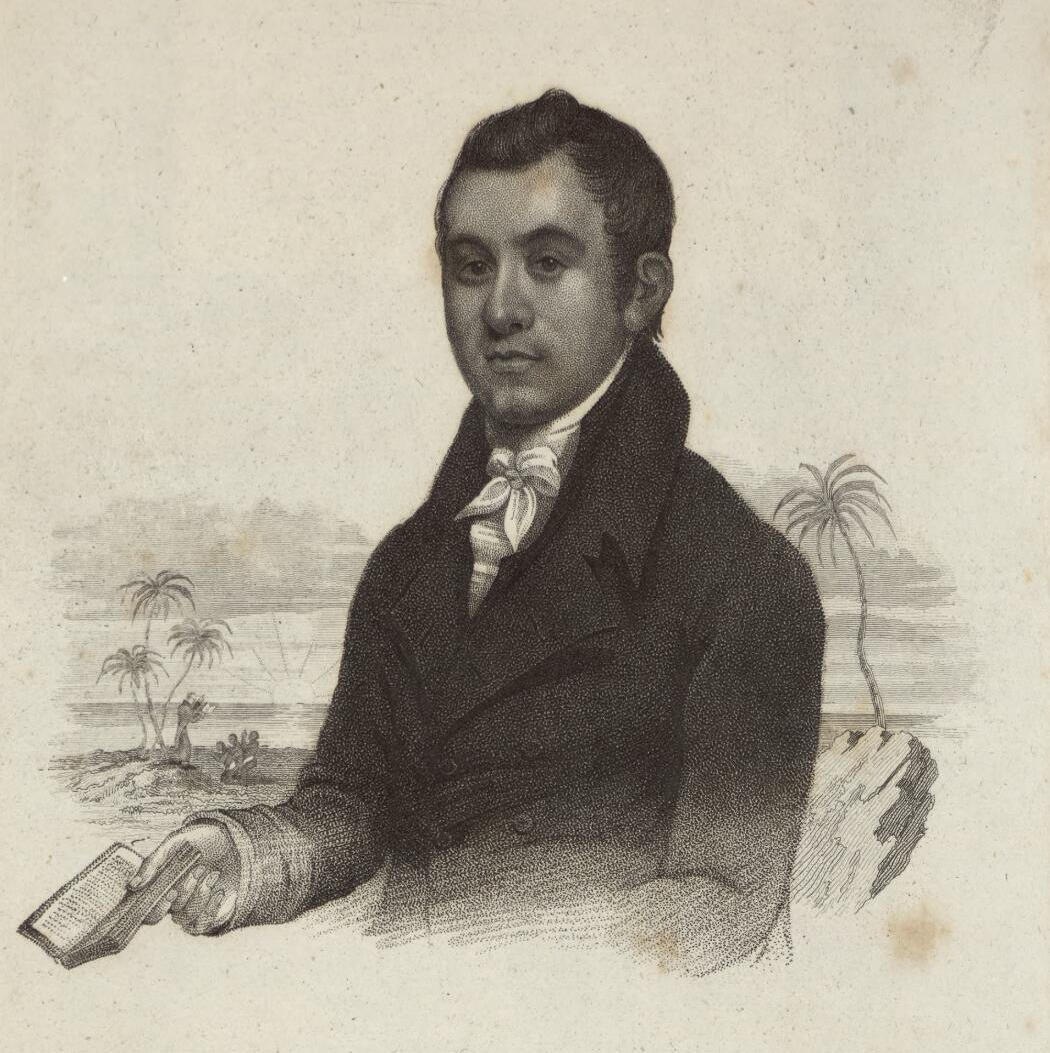
- Missionary to China
- Born: April 1785; Kennethmont, Aberdeenshire, Scotland
- Died: 2 June 1822 (aged 37); Malacca, Malaysia
- Religion: Reformed

William Milne (April 1785 – 2 June 1822) was the second Protestant missionary sent by the London Missionary Society to China, after his colleague, Robert Morrison. Milne served as pastor of Christ Church, Malacca, a member of Ultra-Ganges Missions, the first Principal of Anglo-Chinese College, and chief editor of two missionary magazines: Indo-Chinese Gleaner (English), and Chinese Monthly Magazine (察世俗每月統記傳). Due to Milne's distinguished role in his missionary field, the University of Glasgow granted him a Doctor of Divinity (D.D.) in 1820.

== Early life ==
Milne was born in Braeside of Cults, a village few miles south to Huntly, in the rural parish of Kennethmont in Aberdeenshire, Scotland. His father died when he was only six years old (1791), and his mother taught him at home. While he was still very young, he worked on a farm for a period of time before being apprenticed to a carpenter under training of Adam Sievwright. While excelling at carpentry, he also was reported to have distinguished himself by his profanity learned when was a shepherd boy.

== Conversion ==
According to Milne, he had "a natural predilection for books." When he was young, Milne memorized the Westminster Shorter Catechism, and Thomas Wilson's Mother's Catechism, but had no impact from them, rather as Milne later said, it was for the purpose of "to be equal with my neighbours, and to avoid the displeasure of the minister of the parish." About thirteen years of age, Milne experienced "a partial reformation," which was effected through: 1) the reading of tracts and Christian books, 2) two pious Christian examples, 3) hope of salvation through prayer, 4) fear of evil and danger, and 5) the sufferings of Christ symbolized through the Lord's Table. From then, Milne started to attend Sunday schools and prayer meetings. In 1801, by the age of sixteen, Milne experienced conversion.

Soon after his conversion, Milne decided to leave the Church of Scotland, and to join "another body of Christians" which was evangelical and with edifying preaching. As a result, in 1804, Milne was received as a member of a Congregational church pastored by George Cowie at Huntly.

== Missionary career ==
About 1809, he applied to the London Missionary Society. After conferring with a group of ministers at Aberdeen, he was sent to Gosport, where he studied under David Bogue for three years. Ordained as a missionary to China on 16 July 1812 at Rev. John Griffin's church at Portsea, Portsmouth, Milne proposed "to go from house to house, from village to village, from town to town, and from country to country, where access may be gained, in order to preach the Gospel to all who will not turn away their ear from it."

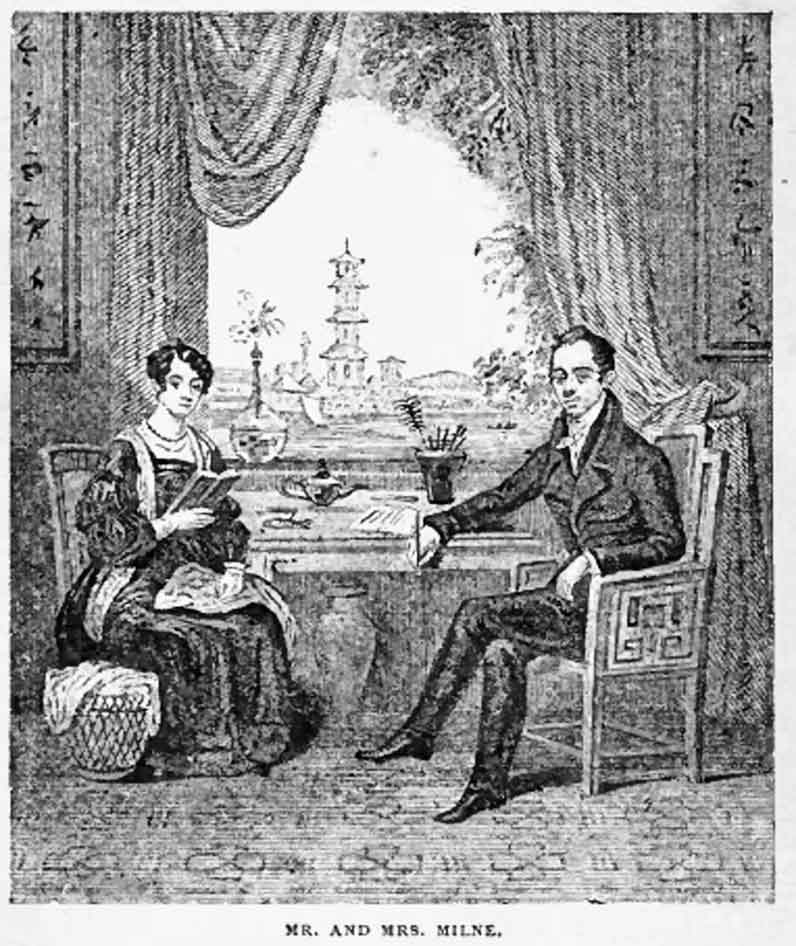
Mr & Mrs Milne.

Milne was married to Rachel Cowie, daughter of Charles Cowie, Esq. of Aberdeen, at St. Leonard's on 4 August 1812. They soon departed from Portsmouth for the Cape of Good Hope on 4 September 1812. The Milnes stayed at the Cape of Good Hope with John Campbell for a few days, and they did not arrive in Macau until 4 July 1813. Milne, with his wife and infant child were expelled by the Roman Catholic priests there after three days, and he left for Guangzhou, where he was able to begin study of the Chinese language. His observation regarding the difficulty of an English-speaker acquiring the Chinese tongue has been frequently repeated:

"Learning the Chinese language requires bodies of iron, lungs of brass, heads of oak, hands of spring steel, eyes of eagles, hearts of apostles, memories of angels, and lives of Methuselah."

After six months with Robert Morrison as his first and only help that had come to join the work from England, he took Morrison's advice to visit Java and the Chinese settlements in the Indonesian archipelago. Milne agreed and traveled south, distributing tracts and books, finally returning to Guangzhou on 5 September to spend the winter of 1813–1814 there.

Milne spent most of his missionary career in the British Straits Settlements of Malacca, beginning in the Spring of 1815. He set up a printing press and school, continuing to preach the Gospel to the local Chinese.

In January 1816, Milne visited Penang, and established a printing press there also. Milne was also the first Principal of The Anglo Chinese College at Malacca. He collaborated more with Morrison to produce the second complete Chinese version of the Bible, translating the books of Deuteronomy through Job.

Liang Fa, converted to Christianity in 1815 and baptized by Milne, became the first Chinese Protestant minister and evangelist. Liang Fa later became renowned as the author of the Christian literature that inspired Hong Xiuquan and the Taiping Rebellion.

In these years Milne published a translation of the Sacred Edict of the Kangxi Emperor. His 1819 tract "The Two Friends" became the most widely used Chinese Christian tract until the early twentieth century. Milne was remarkably prolific for one who came to literary work so late in life, and twenty-one Chinese works are attributed to him. Several were of substantial length; one was the Chinese Monthly Magazine (察世俗每月統記傳 Chashisu Meiyue Tongjizhuan), the first Chinese language magazine in the modern sense of the word; that ran from 1815 to 1822 and totaled several hundred pages. In addition, he produced two substantial books and a Malacca periodical in English.

== Honour ==
The University of Glasgow conferred on him the honorary degree of Doctor of Divinity (D.D.) on 26 November 1820.

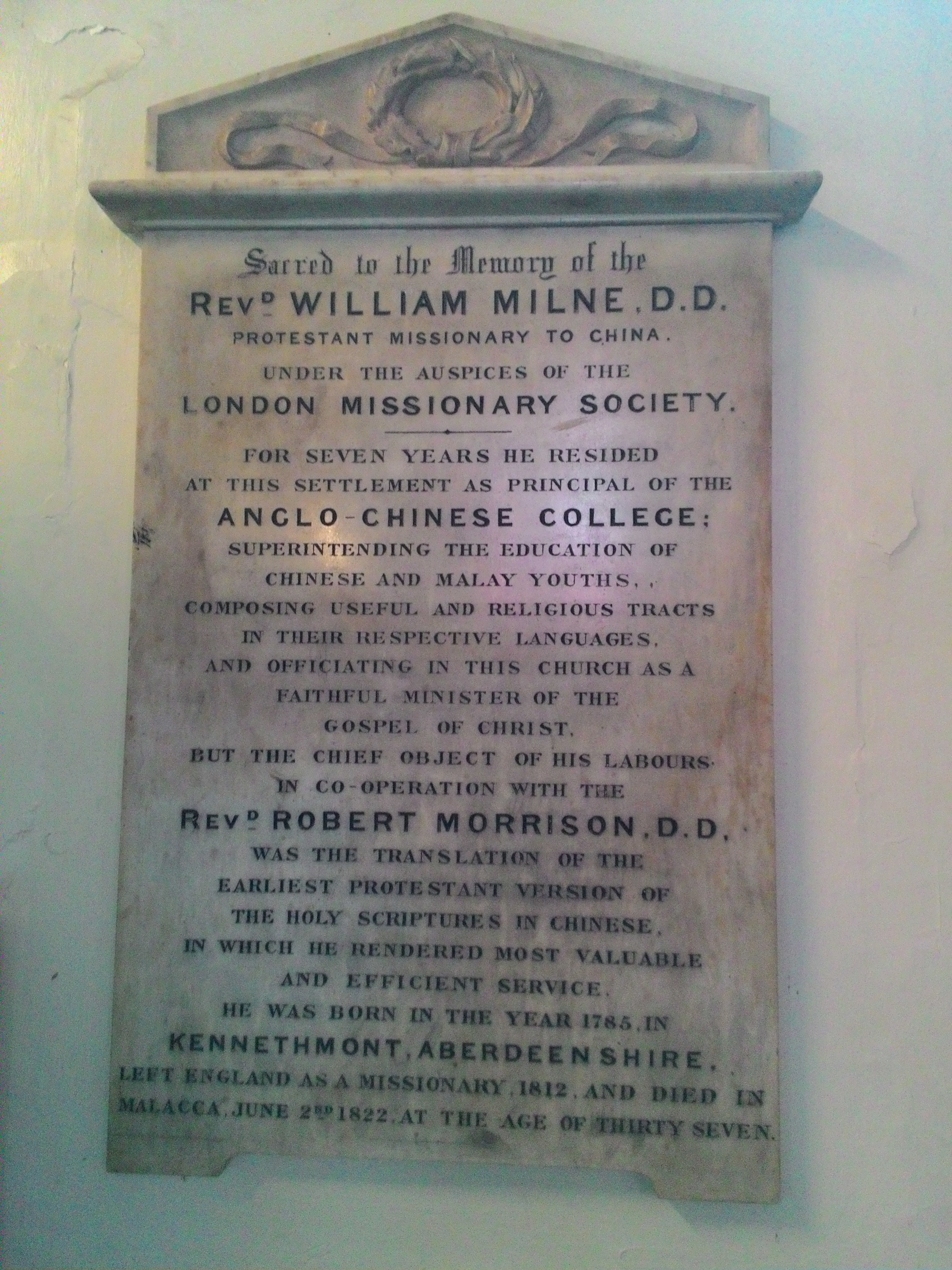
The headstone of William Milne, located in Christ Church, Malacca, Malaysia

== Family ==
Rachel Cowie Milne gave birth to six children for William, but two of them, David (d. 4 May 1816) and Sarah (d. 10 April 1817) died in infancy. Among the four surviving children, Rachel Amelia is the eldest, and the twin sons, Robert George and William Charles. Farquhar was born when Rachel Cowie Milne was suffering from a serious illness, and was baptized at Rachel's dying bed.

Rachel Cowie Milne died on 20 March 1819 at Klebang, Malacca, leaving her will that her Amelia might receive proper education. William Milne buried Rachel in Malacca.

After William Milne's death in 1822, his four surviving children were sent back to England, to receive further education under the care of Rev. Andrew Reed (1787–1862). Both Robert George and William Charles Milne graduated from Homerton Academy and Marischal College of Aberdeen University. Later, William Charles followed his father's steps and became a missionary to China being sent by London Missionary Society, and a tutor to British translators in China. William Charles died in 1863 and was buried in a Russian cemetery at Beijing. Robert George Milne served as a Dissenting minister in Lancaster, and died in 1882.

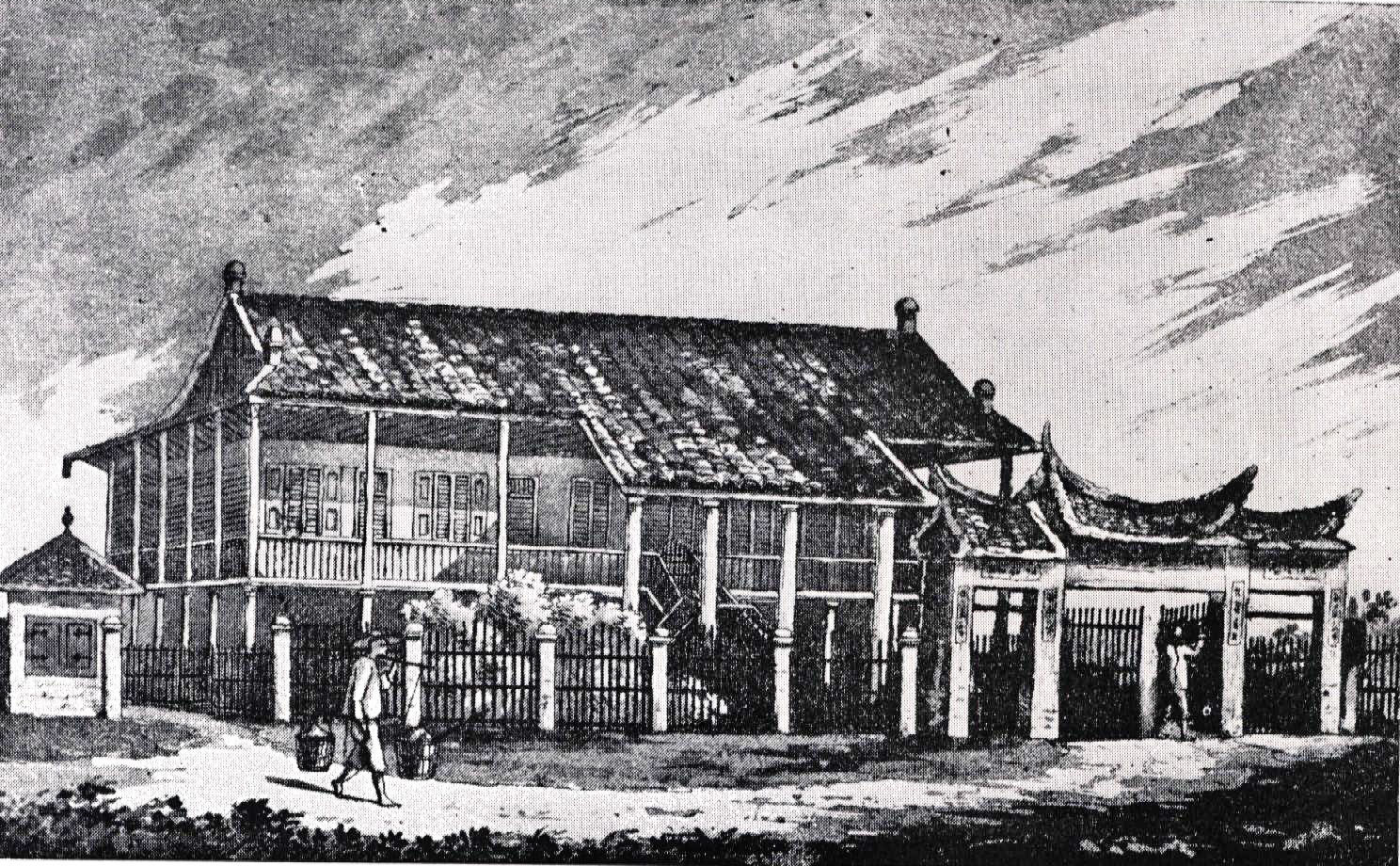
The Anglo-Chinese College in Malacca, Malaya (Malaysia) in 1834.

== Works in Chinese ==
- A Farewell Address. 3 leaves. Batavia, 1814.
- 求世者言行眞史記. "Life of Christ." 71 leaves. Canton, 1814.
- 進小門走窄路解論. "Tract on the Strait Gate." 10 leaves. Malacca, 1816.
- 崇真實棄假謊略說. "Tract on the Sin of Lying, and the Importance of Truth." 5 leaves. Malacca, 1816.
- 幼學淺解問答. "A Catechism for Youth." 37 leaves. Malacca, 1817.
- 祈禱眞法注解. "Exposition of the Lord's Prayer." 41 leaves. Malacca, 1818.
- 諸國異神論. "Tract on Idolatry." 7 leaves. Malacca, 1818.
- 生意公平聚益法. "On Justice Between Man and Man." 10 leaves. Malacca, 1818.
- 聖書節註十二訓. "Twelves Short Sermons." 12 leaves. Malacca, 1818.
- 賭博明論略講. "The Evils of Gambling." 13 leaves. Malacca, 1819.
- 張遠兩友相論. "Dialogues Between Chang and Yuan." 20 leaves. Malacca, 1819.
- 古今聖史記集. "Sacred History." 71 leaves. Malacca, 1819.
- 受災學義論說. "Duty of Men in Times of Public Calamity." 13 leaves. Malacca, 1819.
- 三寶仁會論. "Three Benevolent Societies." 32 leaves. Malacca, 1821.
- 全地萬國紀略. "Sketch of the World." 30 leaves. Malacca, 1822.
- 鄉訓五十二則. "Twelves Village Sermons." 70 leaves. Malacca, 1824.
- 上帝聖教公會門. "The Gate of God's Church." 30 leaves. Malacca.
- 靈魂篇大全. "Treatise on the Soul." 183 leaves. Malacca, 1824.
- 聖書節解. "Commentary on Ephesians." 104 leaves. Malacca, 1825.
- 神天聖書. "The Holy Bible." Malacca, 1824.
- 察世俗每月統記傳. "Chinese Monthly Magazine." 7 Volumes, 524 leaves. Malacca, 1815–1821.

== Works in English ==
- The Sacred Edict, containing sixteen maxims of the emperor Kang-he, amplified by his son, the emperor Yoong-ching; together with a Paraphrase on the whole, by a Mandarin. pp. 299. London, 1817.
- A Retrospect of the First Ten Years of the Protestant Mission to China, (Now, in Connection With the Malay, Denominated, the Ultra-Ganges Missions.) Accompanied with Miscellaneous Remarks on the Literature, History, and Mythology of China, &c. pp. viii, 376. Malacca, 1820.
- The Indo-Chinese Gleaner. Containing miscellaneous communications on the Literature, History, Philosophy, Mythology, &c. of the Indo-Chinese nations, drawn chiefly from the native languages. Christian Miscellanies; and general news. Malacca, 1817–1822. This Magazine which came out quarterly was edited, and for the greater part written by Dr. Milne.
- Some Account of a Secret Association in China Entitled the Triad Society. The first published paper written in English about the secretive Triad society in Southern China. Published in the Royal Asiatic Society of Great Britain & Ireland in 1825 after Milne's death by Robert Morrison.

== Bibliography ==
- Robert Morrison, Memoirs of the Rev. William Milne, D.D. (1824)
- Robert Philip, The Life and Opinions of the Rev. William Milne, D.D., Missionary to China (1840).
- Daniel H. Bays, Christian Tracts: The Two Friends, in Suzanne Wilson Barnett and John King Fairbank, eds., Christianity in China: Early Protestant Missionary Writings (1985)
- Brian Harrison, Waiting for China: The Anglo-Chinese College at Malacca, 1818–1843, and Early Nineteenth-Century Missions (Hong Kong University Press, 1979)
- Christopher Hancock, Robert Morrison and the Birth of Chinese Protestantism (T & T Clark, 1979)
- Baiyu Andrew Song, Training Laborers For His Harvest: A Historical Study of William Milne's Mentorship of Liang Fa (Wipf & Stock, 2015).
