= Benjamin Keasberry =

Benjamin Peach Keasberry (1811 - 6 September 1875) was a Protestant missionary, translator, publisher and educator. He established the Prinsep Street Presbyterian Church and a free Malay boarding school, and translated many works into Malay, including the New Testament, publishing them through his own printing press.

== Early life and education ==
Keasberry was born in Hyderabad, India in 1811. His father was an officer in the British Indian Army who was appointed as British Resident in Tegal, Central Java by Sir Stamford Raffles in 1814. He was educated in Madras and Mauritius.

== Career ==
He came to Singapore in the 1820s to do business, but was met with failure and went to Batavia to work as a clerk in a mercantile firm. Following the death of a close friend, he applied to be an assistant missionary with the London Missionary Society's Batavia station. From 1830 to 1834, he apprenticed under Walter Henry Medhurst, who taught him Bible translation, village preaching, hospital chaplaincy, teaching, printing, book binding, lithography and literature distribution. He travelled to the United States in 1835 to attend the New Brunswick Theological Seminary in New Brunswick, New Jersey. There, he was ordained a minister.

Keasberry initially planned to travel to China with wife, but was rejected in Macau. On his way back to Java, he arrived in Singapore and decided to stay to spread Christianity among the local Malay community. In order to support himself, he began giving drawing lessons. In his free time, he would interact with the local Malay community and distribute tracts. In September 1939, due to his fluency in Malay, he was invited to join the Singapore branch of the London Missionary Society as an agent. He was then tasked with preaching to the local Malay community. He initially preached society's church on Bras Basah Road. He founded the Prinsep Street Presbyterian Church, initially known as the Malay Mission Chapel and popularly called the "Tuan Keasberry puna Graja", in August 1843 as he believed that a larger meeting space was required. More than 60 Malays and Peranakans attended the church's inaugural service. He also taught classes at the Singapore Institution Free School with Alfred North and Munshi Abdullah. The classes were discontinued due to low enrollment numbers, and Keasberry then became an examiner for writing and drawing for the school.

Keasberry established a school for Malay boys in a shophouse on Rochor Road in 1840 with 12 Orang Laut students, who were taught reading, writing, geography, arithmetic, music, Bible scriptures, and later natural sciences and English In the same year, he began printing educational materials with a lithographic press borrowed from missionaries of the American Board of Commissioners for Foreign Missions. Among the first publications that he published and printed was The Child's Picture Defining and Reading Book by Thomas Hopkins Gallaudet, which he had translated into Malay, and Kitab Darihal Tabiat Jenis-Jenis Kejadian Iaitu Guna Bagi Kanak-Kanak. However, as the lithographic stones were defective and supplies were lacking, he appealed to the London Missionary Society for new printing equipment and supplies. In September 1842, the society transferred its printing press in Malacca to Singapore for Keasberry's use. In 1848, he moved the boarding school to a larger location on River Valley Road, and hired Munshi Abdullah as a teacher. The school's total enrollment later grew to 60 students, and among who attended the school was Sultan Abu Bakar of Johor. A Malay girls' school was added in 1857.

When the London Missionary Society closed its Singapore branch in 1846, Keasberry and his wife resigned from the society and continued in Singapore as independent missionaries. The printing press was then shipped to China, after which it was replaced with a small lithographic press and a fount of types which the society had gifted him, as well as printing materials from the Anglo-Chinese College in Malacca, which was run by the London Missionary Society. The society also handed over its chapel in Singapore to him, which he then converted into a printing and book binding establishment. In 1849, he began printing in a style that imitated the style of Malay manuscripts. The style was very popular, and was adopted by the local Malay commercial press.

Keasberry was commissioned by the British and Foreign Bible Society to translate the New Testament to Malay, and he did so with the assistance of Munshi Abdullah, printing it in 1853. Among the various other works he translated or printed are The Life of Jesus by Ernest Renan, the Book of Psalms, the Hikayat Abdullah, The Pilgrim's Progress by John Bunyan, The Book of Proverbs, The Book of Genesis and The Book of Exodus.

== Personal life and death ==
He met and married Charlotte Parker while studying at the New Brunswick Theological Seminary.

He died on 6 September 1875 after collapsing from a heart disease while he was preaching at the Prinsep Street Presbyterian Church.
