= Eliza Hillier =

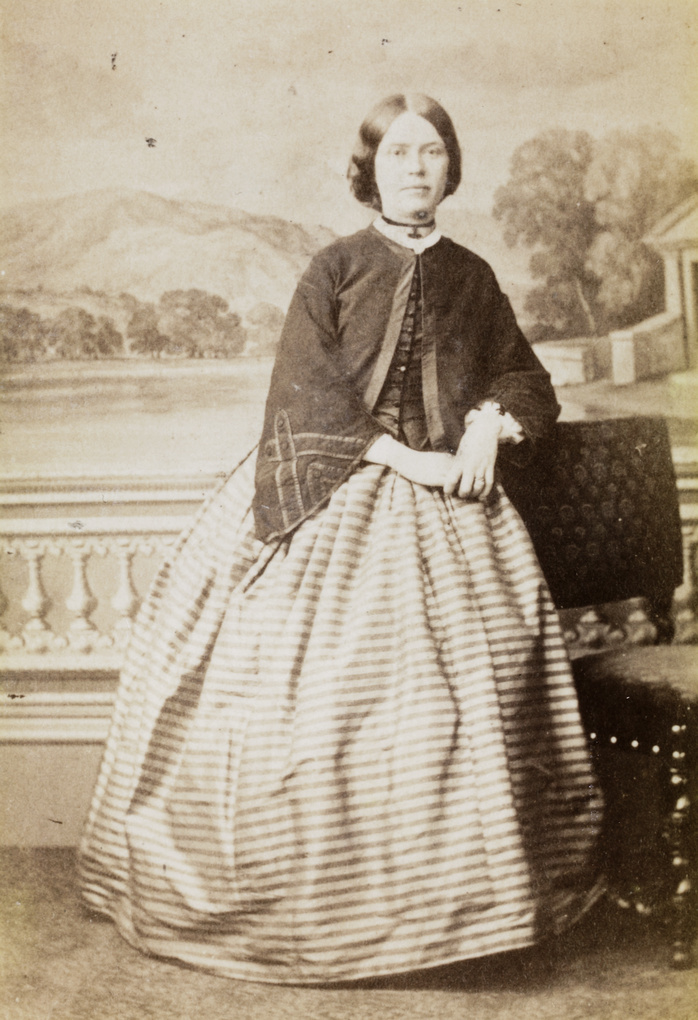
- Born: July 24, 1828; Batavia
- Died: February 20, 1886 (aged 57)
- Spouse(s): Charles Batten Hillier, Charles Marshall Hole
- Children: At least 9, including Walter Hillier
- Parent(s): Walter Henry Medhurst
- Relatives: Walter Henry Medhurst

Eliza Mary Medhurst Hillier Hole (July 24, 1828 – February 20, 1886) was a British writer. Her correspondence with her sister was published as My Dearest Martha: The Life and Letters of Eliza Hillier (2021).

Eliza Hillier was born on July 24, 1828 in Batavia, the third surviving child of missionary Walter Henry Medhurst and Elizabeth "Betty" Martin. Martin was the daughter of a British army officer and a woman who may have been of Tamil origin. Eliza Hillier's brother was the diplomat Walter Henry Medhurst.

She accompanied her family on its travels to England, back to Batavia, to Hong Kong, and to Shanghai. In 1846, at the age of seventeen, she married Charles Batten Hiller, who would serve as Chief Magistrate of Hong Kong, 1847-1856. After his death in 1856, four months after he became the first British Consul to Siam, she returned to England with her children, where she remained the rest of her life.

She published three articles about Siam in Charles Dickens' Household Words in 1857 and 1858. This may have been the start of an attempted writing career for a widow who was struggling financially, as she wrote some unpublished fiction. If so it was unsuccessful. She produced a voluminous amount of correspondence writing to her overseas relatives, some of which was published by her descendant Andrew Hillier as My Dearest Martha: The Life and Letters of Eliza Hillier (2021).

== Personal life ==
She married Charles Batten Hiller in 1846. They had five surviving children, including diplomat Sir Walter Caine Hillier KCMG CB. In 1864, she married solicitor Charles Marshall Hole and they had three children.
