= Walter Medhurst =

Walter Medhurst may refer to:

- Walter Henry Medhurst (1796–1857), English Congregationalist missionary to China
- Walter Henry Medhurst (consul) (1822–1885), his son, British diplomat in China
