= Wang Tao (translator) =

Chinese scholar (1828–1897)

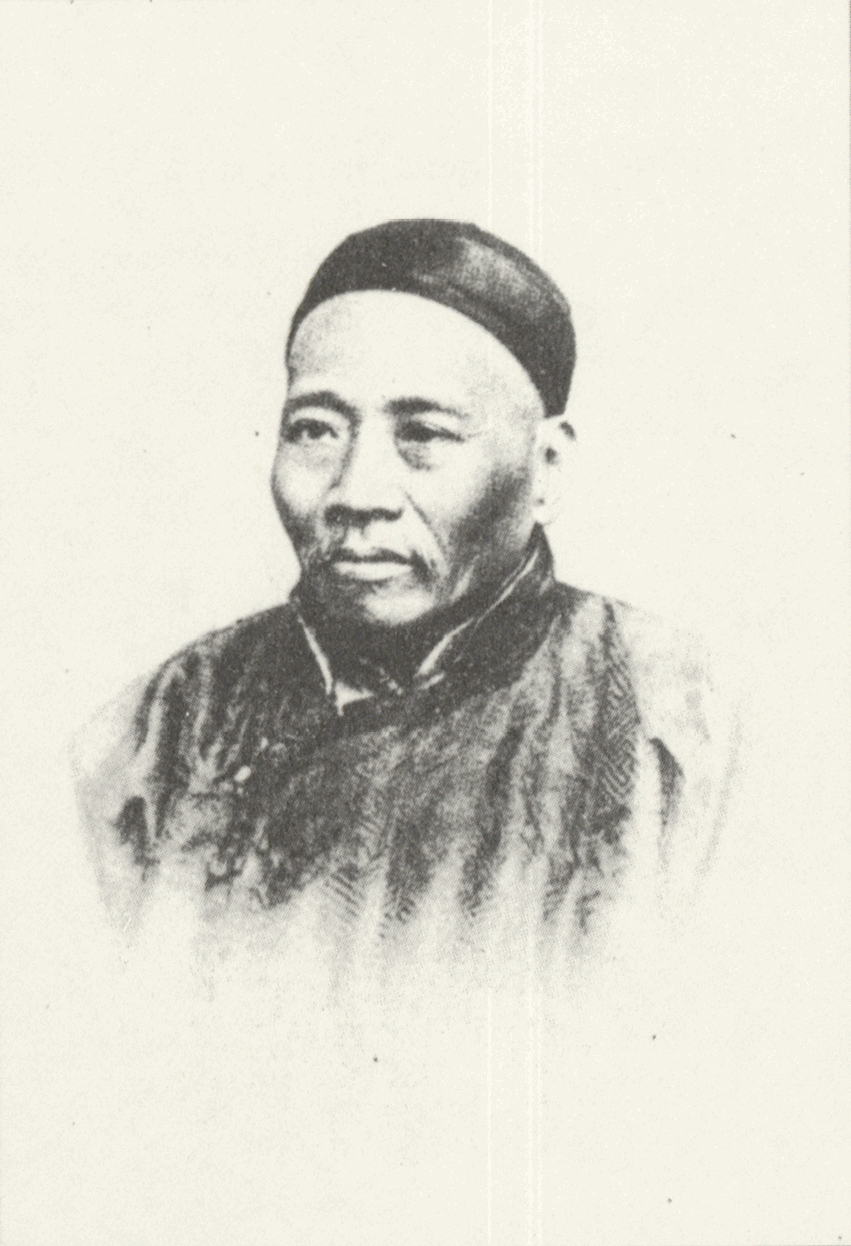
- Born: Wang Libin (王利賓); 10 November 1828; Luzhi, Wuzhong District, Suzhou, Jiangsu
- Died: 24 May 1897 (aged 68); Shanghai
- Other names: Wang Han (王瀚); Lanying (蘭瀛); Lanjin (懶今); Ziquan (紫詮); Lanqing (蘭卿)
- Occupations: Translator, reformer, political columnist, newspaper publisher, fiction writer

Chinese name
- Traditional Chinese: 王韜
- Simplified Chinese: 王韬
Transcriptions
Standard Mandarin
- Hanyu Pinyin: Wáng Tāo
- Wade–Giles: Wang^{2} T'ao^{1}
Yue: Cantonese
- Jyutping: Wong^{4} Tou^{1}

Wang Tao (Chinese: 王韜; 10 November 1828 – 24 May 1897) was a Chinese translator, reformer, political columnist, newspaper publisher and fiction writer of the Qing dynasty. He was born Wang Libin in Puli Town in Suzhou prefecture. (Note: The water town 甫里 Puli was the named after Tang Dynasty poet Lu Puli; Puli Town is now Luzhi township. Water town Luzhi is 18 km east of Suzhou city, now on UNESCO'S list of World Cultural Heritage, also a four A tourist site. Almost all references about Wang Tao mentioned that Wang Tao was born in "Wu county"; only Wang Tao himself pinpointed his birth place as PULI township in his 漫遊隨錄 Man Yiu Shui Lu. Encyclopædia Britannica has the birth place of Wang Tao transliterated incorrectly as Fu-li-chen. 甫 indeed can be pronounced as fu, but 甫里 is Pu-li, not Fu-li, one syllable wrong caused EB to move Wang Tao's hometown from Suzhou to Hegang.)

== Life ==
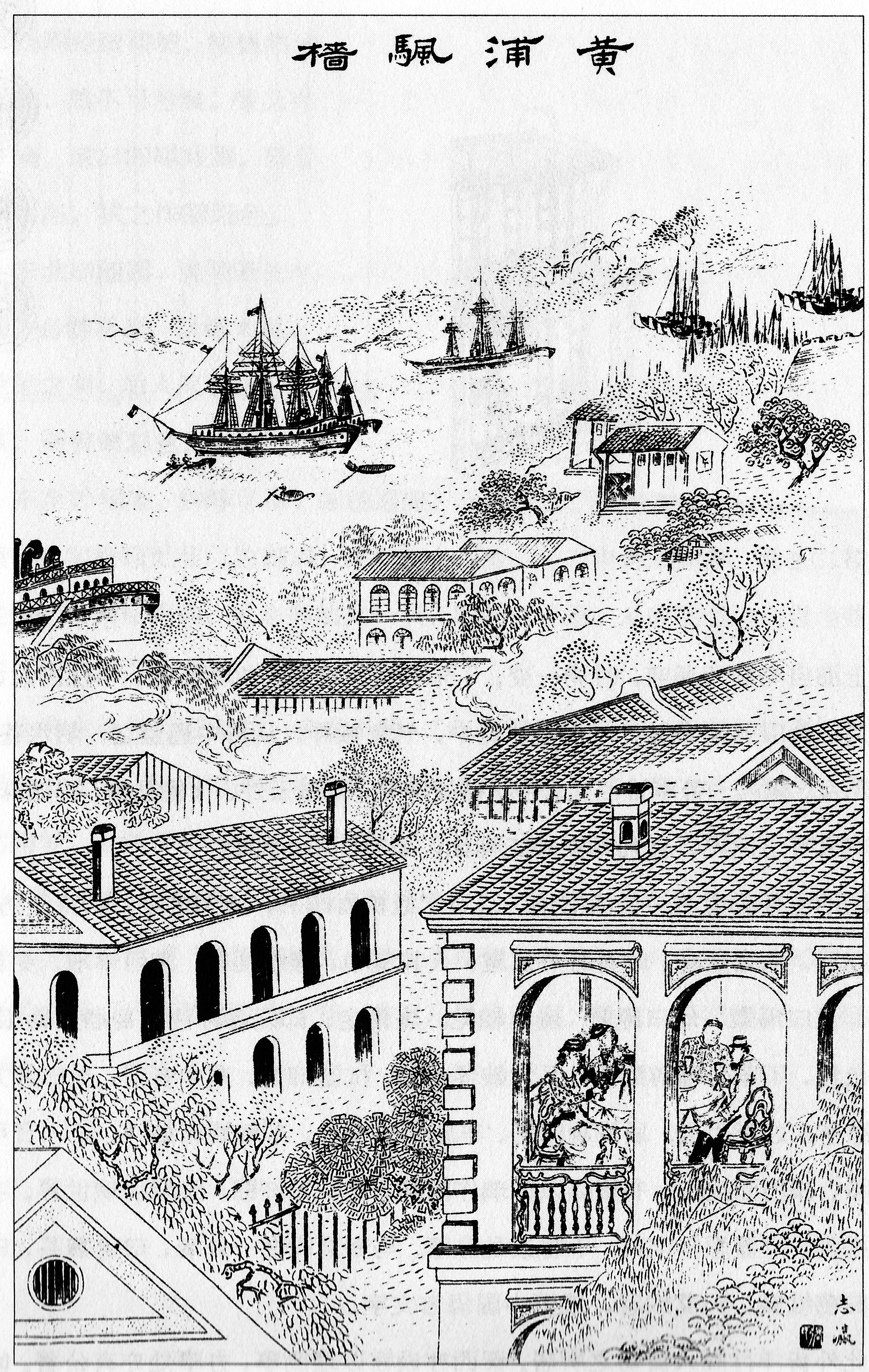
Shanghai in Wang Tao's Travel Notes

In 1848, Wang Tao went to Shanghai to visit his father. During his stay in Shanghai, Wang Tao visited the London Missionary Society Press. He was warmly greeted by Walter Henry Medhurst and his daughters Mary and Ellen. (Note: The names of W. H. Medhurst's daughters were given by Wang Tao in Chinese as Ma-Li and Ai-lun in his book: 漫遊隨錄 Man Yiu Shui Lu Tu Shu Chapter 8, "Sails and Masts on WangPu River".) Wang Tao also met missionaries William Muirhead, Joseph Edkins, and William Charles Milne, all well versed in spoken and written Chinese language.

=== Work with the London Missionary Society ===
In 1849 Wang Tao's father died. Wang Tao was looking for a job to support his family. He was offered a job by Walter Henry Medhurst at the London Missionary Society Press in Shanghai assisting in his translation of the New Testament into Chinese. Wang Tao worked at the London Missionary Society Press for the next 13 years. In this period, he also translated many English books into Chinese in collaboration with missionaries Alexander Wylie and Joseph Edkins. These included Pictorial Optics, An Elementary Introduction to Mechanics, Concise History of Sino-British Trade, and A History of Astronomy of the Western Countries.

=== Refuge in Hong Kong ===
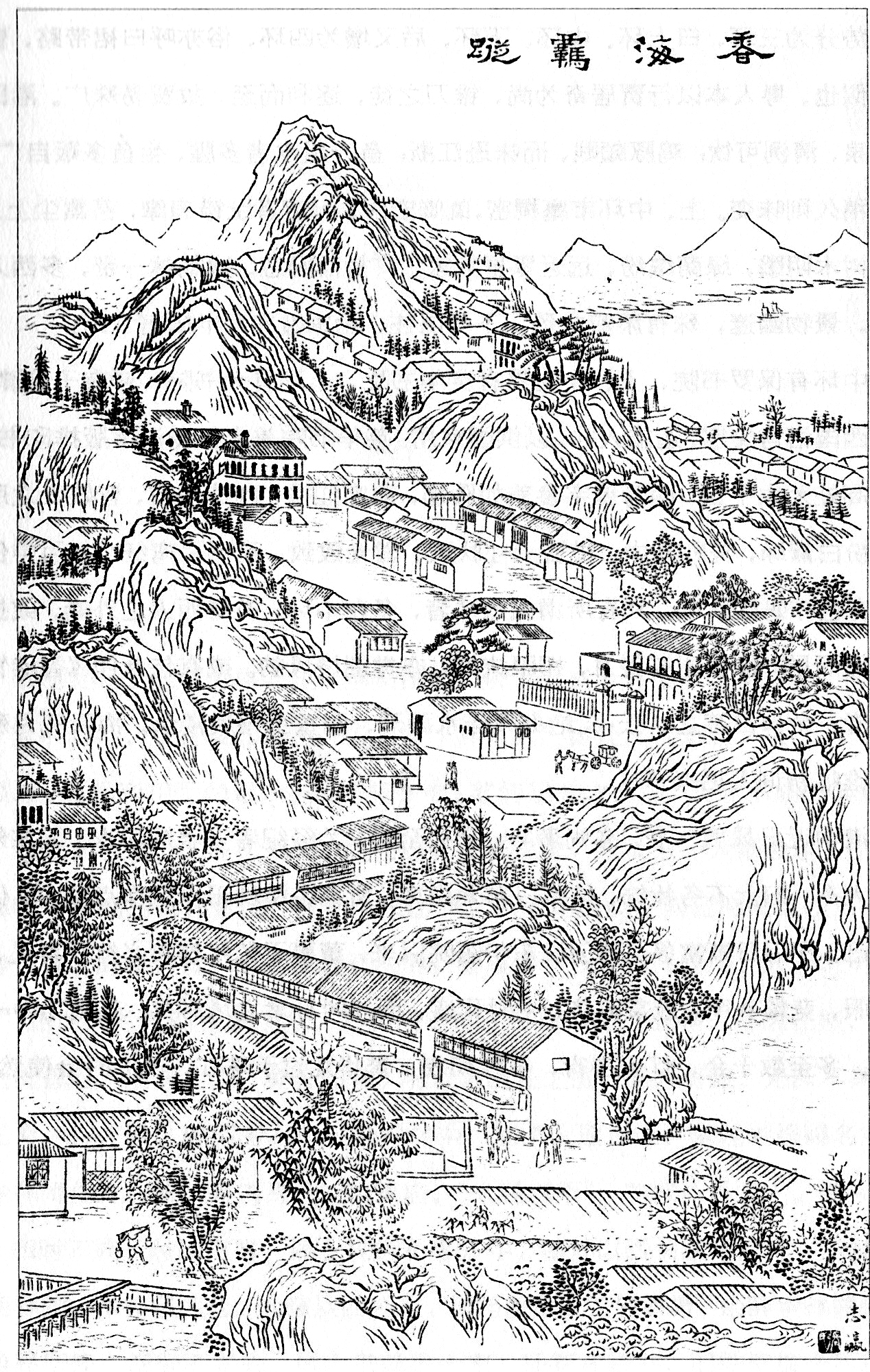
Drawing of Hong Kong in Wang Tao's 1887 travelog

The middle of the 19th century was a period of turmoil in China. In 1860, the Taiping Rebellion had captured Suzhou, Changzhou, and was threatening Shanghai. During this period, Wang Tao was in contact with the leaders of the Taiping Heavenly Kingdom. In 1862, he even wrote a letter under the pseudonym Wang Wan to a Taiping leader, proposing tactics against the Qing military and suggesting that westerners were not the enemy of Taiping. He stated that the real enemy was the Qing government; if the Taiping army could achieve victory over the Qing army led by Zeng Guofan, then the westerners might take side with the Taiping Kingdom.

When the Qing army captured Shanghai, this letter fell into the hands of the Qing government, and the Tongzhi Emperor ordered Wang Tao to be arrested. He took refuge in the British Consulate, remaining there for more than four months. In October 1862, a disguised Wang Tao, escorted by several people from the British Consulate, boarded a Jardine Matheson ship named Rona bound for Hong Kong. This is how he left his homeland to which he was not to return for twenty-two years. In Hong Kong, he changed his name from Wang Libin to Wang Tao.

In Hong Kong, James Legge, the principal of the Anglo-Chinese College invited Wang Tao to stay at the London Mission Society hostel and to assist him in the translation of The Thirteen Classics. By 1865, Legge and Wang had completed the translation of Shang Shu and The Bamboo Book Annals.

In this period, Wang Tao also took on the job of editor in chief of a Chinese newspaper Hua Zi News in Hong Kong, this was the beginning of his journalism career.

=== Move to Scotland ===
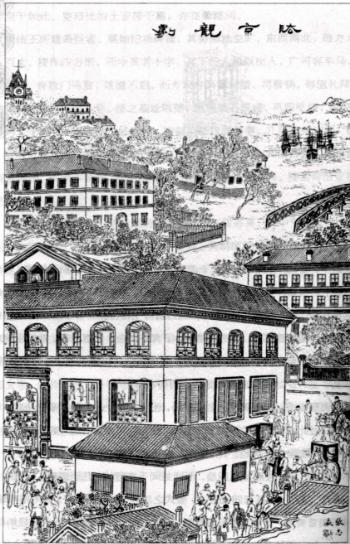
Paris

In 1867, James Legge returned to his native Scotland, settling in the small town of Dollar in Clackmannanshire. He wrote a letter to Wang Tao, inviting him to come to Scotland to continue assisting in the translation of more Chinese classics. Wang Tao boarded a ship and departed from Hong Kong. The ship stopped at Singapore, Ceylon, Penang, Aden, Messina, and Cairo before reaching Marseille. (Note: The names of all the port of call on Wang Tao's voyage from Hong Kong to England can be found in Wang Tao's Man Yiu Shui Lu Vol 1, Vol 2.) The voyage from Hong Kong to Marseille took more than forty days. Wang Tao took the opportunity of sightseeing in all the ports of call. From Marseille, he took a train to Lyon, then to Paris. He visited the Louvre, and also visited the sinologist Stanislas Julien at the Sorbonne. After a short stay of a little under two weeks, Wang Tao crossed the English Channel from Calais to Dover and took a train to London. After sightseeing in London (including the British Museum), he moved on to Scotland and settled down in Dollar.

During his journey Wang Tao jotted down his impressions of the places he visited. He later collected part of these material into his travel book, Jottings from Carefree Travel (1890), the first travel book about Europe by a Chinese scholar.

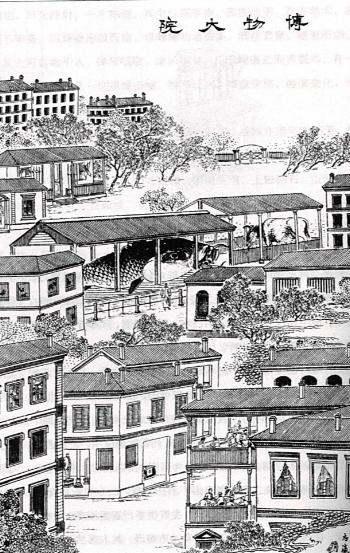
The British Museum

In 1867 Wang Tao was invited by the Chamberlain of Oxford University to deliver a speech in Chinese, the first speech delivered by a Chinese scholar in Oxford. He talked about the importance of cultural exchange between east and west, and claimed that the whole world was heading toward a common great unity (大同). (Note: For more detail about Wang Tao's speech at Oxford, see the chapter "Lun Dun Xiao Yie" (Stop Over at London ) in the book "Man Yiu Shui Lu" by Wang Tao)

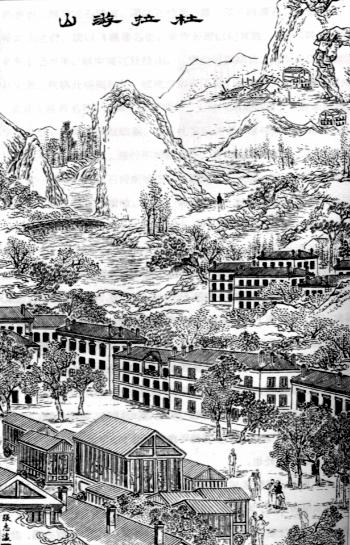
Wang Tao in Dollar, Clackmannanshire, Scotland

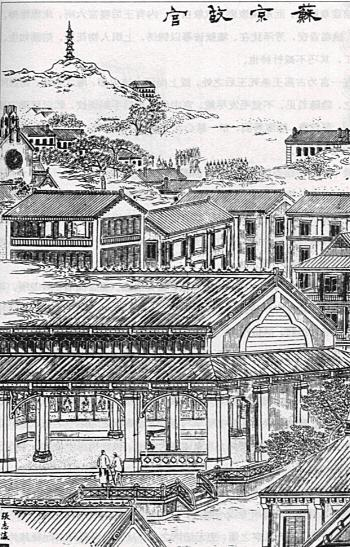
Edinburgh

By the Spring of 1870 the translation of various classics such as The Book of Songs, I Ching, and The Book of Rites were completed.

During 1867–1870, Wang Tao travelled to many places, including Edinburgh, Aberdeen, Huntly, Dundee and Glasgow, or took short trips to Rumbling Bridge Park, Castle Campbell, Tillicoultry, Alva and Stirling Castle; sometimes accompanied by James Legge and his third daughter Mary.

The travel notes about these places were also included in Jottings of Carefree Travel.

=== Return to Hong Kong ===
Having finished his part in the translation of the Chinese Classics, Wang Tao returned to Hong Kong in the winter of 1870. In Hong Kong, he wrote two influential books: A Brief Introduction to France and Report on the Franco-Prussian War. The latter was highly regarded by high mandarins of the Qing government, including Zeng Guofan, Li Hongzhang, and paved the way for his final pardon by the Qing government later.

In 1872, Wang Tao bought the printing press of London Mission in Hong Kong and founded the Zhong Hua General Printing House.

On 5 February 1874 (Note: Paul Cohen cited Arthur W. Hummel, Sr. in "The Eminent Chinese of the Ch'ing Period" (1943–44), stated the date of the first issue of Tsun wan yat Po was 5 January 1874. However Chinese researcher located the second issue of the said newspaper, the date was 5 February 1874, also located a reduced sized reproduction copy of the first issue of this newspaper, the date was 4 February 1874.) Wang Tao founded Tsun-wan yat-po (1874–1947, Universal Circulating Herald), the first Chinese daily newspaper in history. Lin Yutang called Wang Tao the 'Father of the Chinese Newspaper'.

During his ten-year career as editor in chief of Universal Circulating Herald, Wang Tao penned close to a thousand editorials calling for the reform of the Chinese political system, by adopting a British style parliamentary monarchy. He also called for reform of the educational system by introducing western science to the curriculum; he called for the establishment of textile, railway, machinery and mining industries. His reformist editorial articles reached a wide audience.

He was the de facto forerunner of the reformist movement in China. Many of his reformist articles were later published as a volume: Collection of Essays from The Tao Garden.

=== Visit to Japan ===
In 1879, at the invitation of Japanese literati, including Nakamura Masanao. Wang Tao spent over four months in Japan. He visited many cities such as Nagasaki, Nagoya and Tokyo, and notes of this journey became one of his books: A Record of Travels in Japan (Fu-sang yu-chi). (Note: This list of Japanese cities Wang Tao visited is an incomplete list from Wang Tao's preface to his book Man Yiu Shui Lu.)

In Japan, wherever he went, he was surrounded by literati, and sometimes rode in sedan chairs carried by eight men. (Note: Carried by eight-man sedan, see Wang Tao Preface to Man Yiu Shui Lu.) As a scholar who had lived in Europe and who had an in-depth understanding of European politics and culture, he enjoyed very high esteem in Japan. His travel needs were taken care of by the Qing Embassy in Japan. Wang Tao was apparently quite moved by his warm welcome in Japan; he wrote that when he left Japan, he was treated with a grand dinner party attended by more than one hundred celebrities, and that he never thought he could become so famous and important, because during his youth at Puli township, he was a nobody. "How lucky I am to get such welcome by foreign scholars several thousand miles away".

Wang expressed an admiration for Japan's modernisation through selective use of Western institutions and technology; however, later he became distrustful of Japan's foreign policy, especially after the annexation of the Ryukyu Kingdom.

=== Return to Shanghai ===
The fame Wang Tao enjoyed overseas must have affected the Qing government. In 1884, the influential Li Hongzhang sent a letter to the governor of Shanghai, writing: "That gentleman from Kunshan is a rare genius with encyclopedic knowledge. (Note: Kunshan is a city east of Luzhi town. When Wang Tao was 16 years old, he attended an examination at Kunshan prefecture. See his book Man Yiu Shui Lu, article "Deng Shan Yian Tiao" ("View from the Hill")) It is a pity he took exile in Hong Kong, if it is possible to get his service for us, we don't mind a king's ransom". (Note: See Introduction by Wang Jia Ju to Man Yiu Shui Lu Tu Shuo. Li Hongzhan's statement was originally in Chinese.)

In the spring of 1884, Wang Tao and his family returned to Shanghai and settled down in Wusong district, he also founded Tao Garden Publishing House. He nicknamed himself "The Recluse of Tao Garden".

In 1886, Wang Tao became the head of Gezhi College in Shanghai, where he promoted Western style education.

In 1890, Wang Tao published his travelog Jottings from Carefree Travels. He also worked part-time for Shen Pao and International Tribune as special columnist; he wrote about two hundred short stories for Shen Pao, China's most important journal of the age.

Wang Tao died in Shanghai on 24 May 1897, at age 68.

== Impact ==
Many Chinese literati before Wang Tao introduced western ideas and translated books into Chinese. Wang Tao was the first Chinese scholar who participated in two way cultural exchange; on the one hand, Wang Tao worked with W.A. Medhurst, A. Wylie and J. Edkins to translate western religion books and western sciences into China; on the other hand, he also played an important role in assisting James Legge in the translation of a large number of important ancient Chinese classics into English.

Wang Tao forged a bridge between China and the West.

Wang Tao Memorial Hall is located in a Qing style house at No 6. Zhongshi Street, Luzhi township, Suzhou.

== Works ==
=== Translations by James Legge assisted by Wang Tao ===
(The list below is incomplete)

- James Legge: The Sacred Books of China. The Text of Confucianism (Oxford 1885)
- The Book of Change ISBN 0-88356-000-3
- Shu Ching Book of History
- Lao Tsu
- The Hsiao King Or Classic Of Filial Piety ISBN 1-4191-6687-5
- The Chinese Classics : Confucian Analects, the Great Learning, the Doctrine of the Mean, the Works of Mencius (reprint), Oriental Book Store, ISBN 0-89986-353-1

=== Works in English ===
- Wang Tao's Diary: excerpts. Trans. Sebastian Eicher. Renditions 93 (2020).
- "My Sojourn in Hong Kong." In John and Kirstin Miller, Hong Kong. San Francisco: Chronicle Books, 1994.
- Selections from Jottings from Carefree Travels [Man you sui lu]. Trans. Ian Chapman. Renditions 53/54 (2000).
- Writings of Wang Tao [excerpts]. In Ssu-yu Teng and John K. Fairbank, China's Response to the West: A Documentary Survey, 1839–1923. Cambridge: Harvard UP, 1954, 137–42.
- McAleavy, Henry: Translation of 'Mei-Li Hsiao Chuan' 媚麗小傳, a Short Story by Wang T'ao, 1953.

=== Translations from English into Chinese ===
- A History of Astronomy of the Western Countries (西國天學源流, Xīguó Tiānxué Yuánliú), translated with A. Wylie in 1858
- W. Whewell's An elementary treatise on mechanics (重學淺說, Zhòngxué Qiǎnshuō), translated with A. Wylie

=== Works in Chinese ===
- 普法戰紀 Pu Fa Zhan Ji (Franco-Prussian War)
- 法國志略 Brief History of France
- 《淞濱瑣話》 (Song Bin Shuo Hua) (Stories from the Shore of Wushong) ISBN 7-5366-3197-9. A collection of short stories written by Wang Tao after he returned to Shanghai, one story a time on newspaper, then collected into book form. The style of this story book was inspired by Pu Songling's Liao Zhai Zhi Yi Strange Stories from a Chinese Studio, hence this book was also renowned as Liao Zhai Zhi Yi—The Sequel. The translation of "Song bin" as Shore of Wushong is my interpretation. In his later years, he lived at Wushong district at the north part of Shanghai.
- 漫遊隨錄圖記："Man Yiu Shui Lu Tu Ji " ("Jottings and Drawings from Carefree Travel" ) ISBN 7-80603-956-2, 山東畫報出版社 2004/6. This book was first published in Shanghai in 1890, text by Wang Tao, drawings by Zhang Zhi Yi. ::50 of the 51 illustrations in Wang Tao's book "Man Yiu Shui Lu" were drawn by Zhang Zhi Yin before 1887 AD. It is quite clear that these drawings were not life sketches of real scenes.
- 韜園文錄外編 (Collection of Essays from The Tao Garden) ISBN 7-80622-787-3, 上海書店 2002
- Jing Shu Jie Chun A Collection of Studies in Classics
- Xi Shu Jie Chun A Collection on Studies in Western Ideas.
- Biography of Stanislas Aignan Julien
- Biography of Dr. Benjamin Hobson.

== Books on Wang Tao ==
- Cohen, Paul A, Between Tradition and Modernity: Wang T'ao and Reform in Late Ch'ing China, Cambridge, Massachusetts: Harvard University Press, 1988 ISBN 0-674-06875-0
- McAleavy (H), Wang T'ao. The Life and Writings of a Displaced Person (with a Translation of 'Mei-Li Hsiao Chuan', a Short Story by Wang T'ao, 1953.) A lecture delivered at The China Society of London on 22 May 1952.
