= Tristram Hillier =

British painter (1905–1983)

- Born: Tristram Paul Hillier; 11 April 1905; Beijing, China
- Died: 18 January 1983 (aged 77); Bristol, England
- Spouses: Irene Rose Hodgkins; Leda Millicent Hardcastle
- Elected: ARA 1957, FRA 1967

Tristram Paul Hillier RA (11 April 1905 – 18 January 1983) was an English surrealist painter. He was a member of the Unit One group led by Paul Nash.

== Early life and education ==
Tristram Hillier was born on 11 April 1905 in Beijing, China, the youngest of the four children of Edward Guy Hillier (1857–1924), a banker and diplomat, and Ada Everett. His elder siblings were Winifred, Maurice and Madeline. In 1906, he ‘came to Europe from Peking for the first time at the age of six months in the company of my mother, my brother and [two] sisters, a Japanese ‘Amah’ and two Chinese servants’. The Amah was Tuk-San, a Roman Catholic convert, who was "the real influence in my life then and for many years later... and meant more to me ...than my own mother.

A Roman Catholic, he was educated at Downside School. In 1922 he returned to China to study the language, and visit his sister Madeline and Tuk-San and then until 1924 attended Christ's College, Cambridge. He went to the Slade in 1926, where he studied under Henry Tonks, and then to Paris where he studied for two years under André Lhote, and also at the Atelier Colarossi.

== Career ==
In Paris he met many members of the Surrealist movement; he was particularly influenced by Giorgio de Chirico and Max Ernst. He lived in France until 1940, but travelled extensively; he remained a surrealist painter throughout his life.

His first one-man show was at the Lefevre Gallery in 1931; he later exhibited mainly at Tooth's Gallery. From 1933 he was a member of the Unit One group led by Paul Nash. During the Second World War he served in the Royal Navy Volunteer Reserve with the Free French.

After the war he lived in France and in Spain, and then went to live at Yew Tree House, East Pennard in Somerset, England. His autobiography Leda and the Goose was published in 1954.

A retrospective exhibition of his work was held at the Worthing Gallery in 1960. He was made an Associate of the Royal Academy (ARA) in 1957, and a Royal Academician (RA) in 1967.

== Personal life ==
Hiller married twice. From 1931 to 1935 he was married to Irene Rose Hodgkins, the daughter of a bookmaker, with whom he had twin sons, Jonathan and Benjamin. From 1937 he was married to Leda Millicent Hardcastle, daughter of Sydney Hardcastle, the inventor of the First World War Hardcastle torpedo; they had two daughters, Mary and Anna-Clare. He was a strict and aloof parent, and was given to darkening moods.

Tristram Hillier died in Bristol, England, on 18 January 1983. He was buried at Glanvilles Wootton Church, five miles south of Sherborne, Dorset on 22 January 1983 (record number 732 in the Parish Registers of burials 1880–1985). A local journalist, Seth Dellow, has been maintaining the grave since 2023. It is not known why Hillier is buried at Glanvilles Wootton Church.

== Works ==
Works by Tristram Hillier are held in the collections of the Tate Gallery and many other public and private collections.

An exhibition at the Museum of Somerset in Taunton, ran from 9 November 2019 – 18 April 2020, see Landscapes of the Mind: The Art of Tristram Hillier.
