= Medhurst's Chinese and English Dictionary =

Chinese and English Dictionary …
- Title page of Medhurst's Chinese and English Dictionary
- Author: Walter Henry Medhurst
- Language: Chinese, English
- Publisher: Parapattan
- Publication date: 1842
- Publication place: Batavia, Dutch East Indies
- Media type: Print
- Pages: 1,486
- OCLC: 5309778
- Website: https://archive.org/details/medhurst-chinese-and-english-dictionary-1842-43-volumes-1-2

The Chinese and English Dictionary: Containing All the Words in the Chinese Imperial Dictionary, Arranged According to the Radicals (1842), compiled by the English Congregationalist missionary Walter Henry Medhurst (1796–1857), is the second major Chinese–English dictionary after Robert Morrison's pioneering (1815–1823) A Dictionary of the Chinese Language. Medhurst's intention was to publish an abridged and cheaper dictionary that still contained all the 47,035 head characters from the (1716) Kangxi Dictionary, which Morrison's huge dictionary included. Medhurst reversed and revised into his Chinese–English dictionary in compiling the (1847–1848) English and Chinese Dictionary in Two Volumes.

== History ==
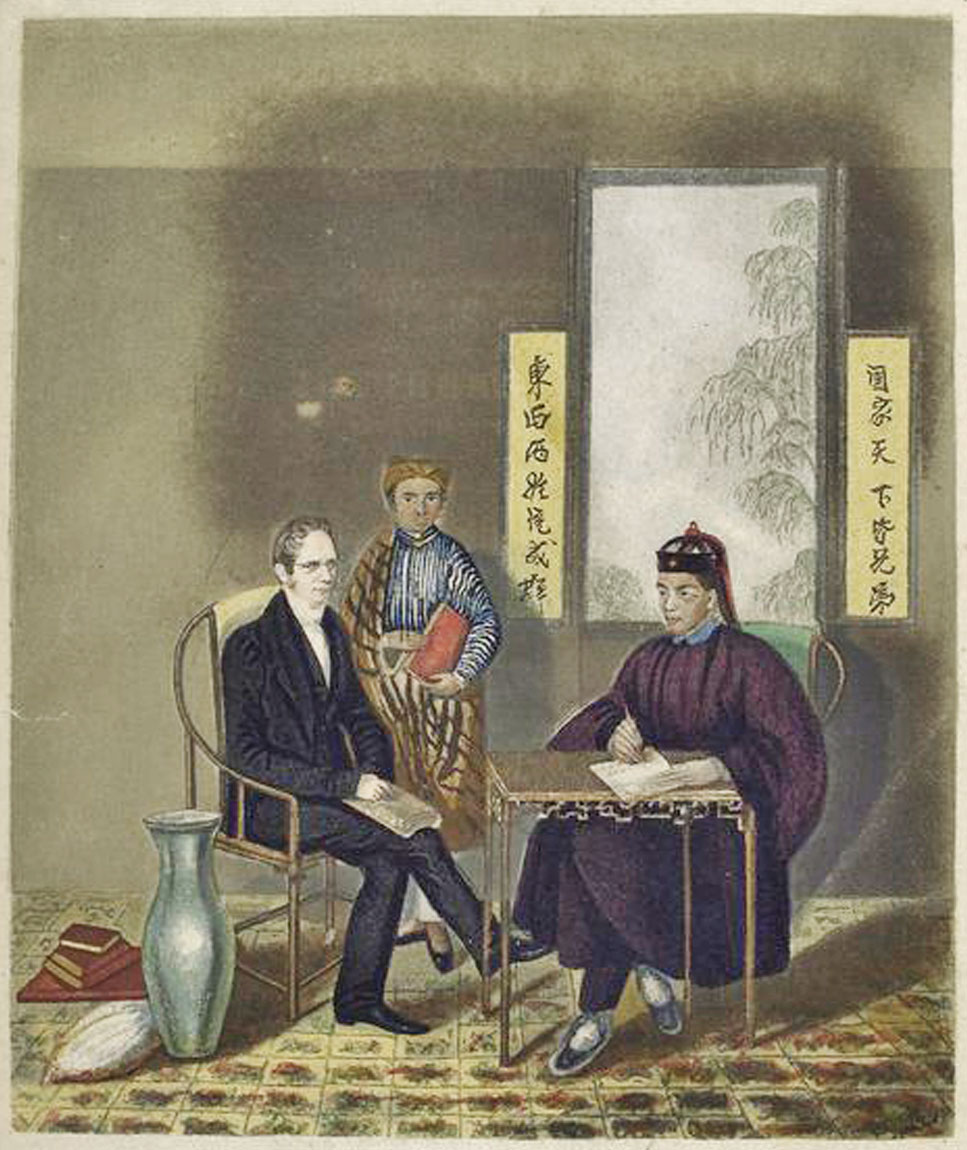
Walter Henry Medhurst with Choo Tih Lang and a Malay student

Walter Henry Medhurst and Robert Morrison were London Missionary Society (LMS) colleagues and friends. Both were professional printers, missionaries in China, and amateur lexicographers. In an 1817 letter, Morrison told the LMS directors that Medhurst had sent a promising specimen of small metal types, intended for magazines and tracts, and said the "qualifications and attention of Mr. M. give us great satisfaction". When Morrison was returning to China in 1826, he met with Medhurst in Java and they discussed their common work.

Medhurst began compiling his dictionary in 1838, and wrote the LMS missionary printer William Ellis in Tahiti that he planned for his English–Chinese dictionary to include about 15,000 entry words and be "fit for every purpose of religion and science".

As Medhurst explained in an 1841 letter to the LMS directors, his motivation to produce a Chinese and English dictionary came from Morrison's expensive one, which the missionary school's students could not afford. He said his "compendious and cheap" dictionary would contain "every character in Morrison's with all of the useful phrases, in one volume at the moderate cost of a few dollars".

Medhurst's preface says his purpose was to compile a "commodious, uniform, and comprehensive Dictionary" for English students of the Chinese language, comprising the 47,035 head characters in the (1716) Kangxi Dictionary ("Imperial Dictionary of Kang-he"), with the exception of those that supposedly have "either no sound or no meaning attached to them". Medhurst initially intended to compile a complete English–Chinese dictionary, but he found that the available materials were insufficient, and it was necessary for him to first create a Chinese–English dictionary, after which the work would be "comparatively easy to reverse the whole", and then add further English terms. Medhurst acknowledges taking phrases from Morrison's Chinese–English dictionary and elsewhere, and adopting Morrison's widely used orthography, with the addition of aspirated consonants and pitch accents or tones, "as far as they were ascertainable".

== Chinese–English content ==
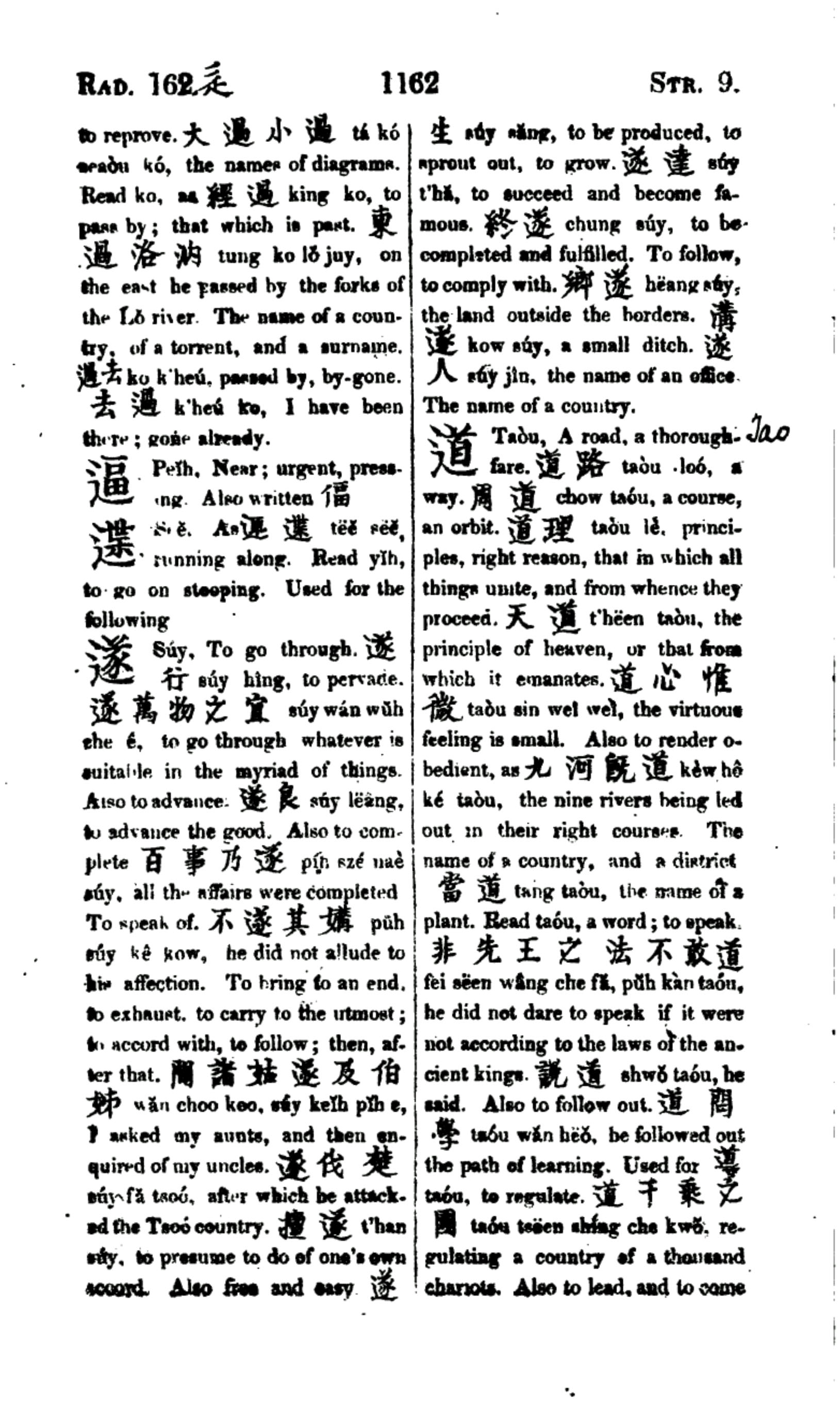
Sample page from Medhurst's Chinese and English Dictionary

Medhurst printed, at his own expense, his dictionary in 1842, at Parapattan Batavia, Dutch East Indies.

The 648-page Volume I was completed by October 1842, and the 838-page Volume II was finished in May 1843, both were published in 600 copies. Its inexpensive printing enabled Medhurst to sell this bulky dictionary at only 10 Spanish dollars.

As the title says, Medhurst collated his bilingual dictionary by radical-and-stroke sorting according to the 214 Kangxi radicals—the same collation method used in Morrison's (1815–1823) Part I Chinese–English dictionary.

Volume I comprises 648 pages of dictionary entries, from Radical 1 一 "one" to Radical 111 矢 "arrow", and 50 pages of supplementary materials. The front matter includes an 11-page preface, 3-page list of the radicals, and the 5-page "Directions for discovering under what Radical any given character may be found"; the postface is a 29-page "List of Obsolete, Contracted, and Vulgar Characters, Not occurring in the foregoing Dictionary Volume I". Volume II comprises 838 pages of dictionary entries, from Radical 112 石 "stone" to Radical 214 龠 "flute", and a 28-page postface list of uncommon characters not in the volume.

The preface briefly explains to dictionary users, particularly English-speaking students of the Chinese language, Medhurst's orthography for Standard Chinese phonology.

The dictionary includes 20 initials, and Medhurst adopted Morrison's method of using apostrophes to represent the unaspirated-aspirated stop consonant pairs (listen to examples here). For instance, this description of the denti-alveolar consonants of unaspirated IPA /t/ and aspirated /tʰ/ (Wade–Giles t and t'; pinyin d and t): "T, as in top; and t'h like the former, only with an aspirate between the t, and following vowel; not as the th in though, or in thing, but at the same letters in the words at home, supposing the initial a to be left out".

The 55 finals are also explained, for example, the rhotic coda or r-colored vowel /ɚ/, which is difficult for many non-native speakers. "Urh, is a peculiar sound, something between the r and I, produced by a vibration of the lower part of the tongue against the inward region of the palate, near the entrance of the throat; it is something similar to the smooth sound of the r, heard in end of English words, as in liar."

Medhurst's dictionary annotates tones in terms of the classical four tones of Middle Chinese pronunciation used in rime dictionaries, instead of the five tones of the 19th-century Southern Mandarin Chinese spoken by Morrison (1 "mid-level", 2 "high rising", 3 "falling", 4 "short", and 5 "rising"). Medhurst indicated píng 平 "level" tone as unmarked (a), shǎng 上 "rising" tone with grave accent (à), qù 去 "departing" tone with acute accent (á), rù 入"entering" tone with short accent (ӑ), and xià píng 下平 "lower even" tone with circumflex accent (â). The entering tone had basically ceased to exist by the 1840s in Beijing, but still remained present in Nanjing.

Medhurst adopted Morrison's dictionary page layout with the page number centered between the character radical number and stroke number: Radical 162 辵 or 辶 "walk" and the 9 additional strokes in shǒu 首 "head" (animated 12-stroke order for 道 is shown here).

== English–Chinese content ==
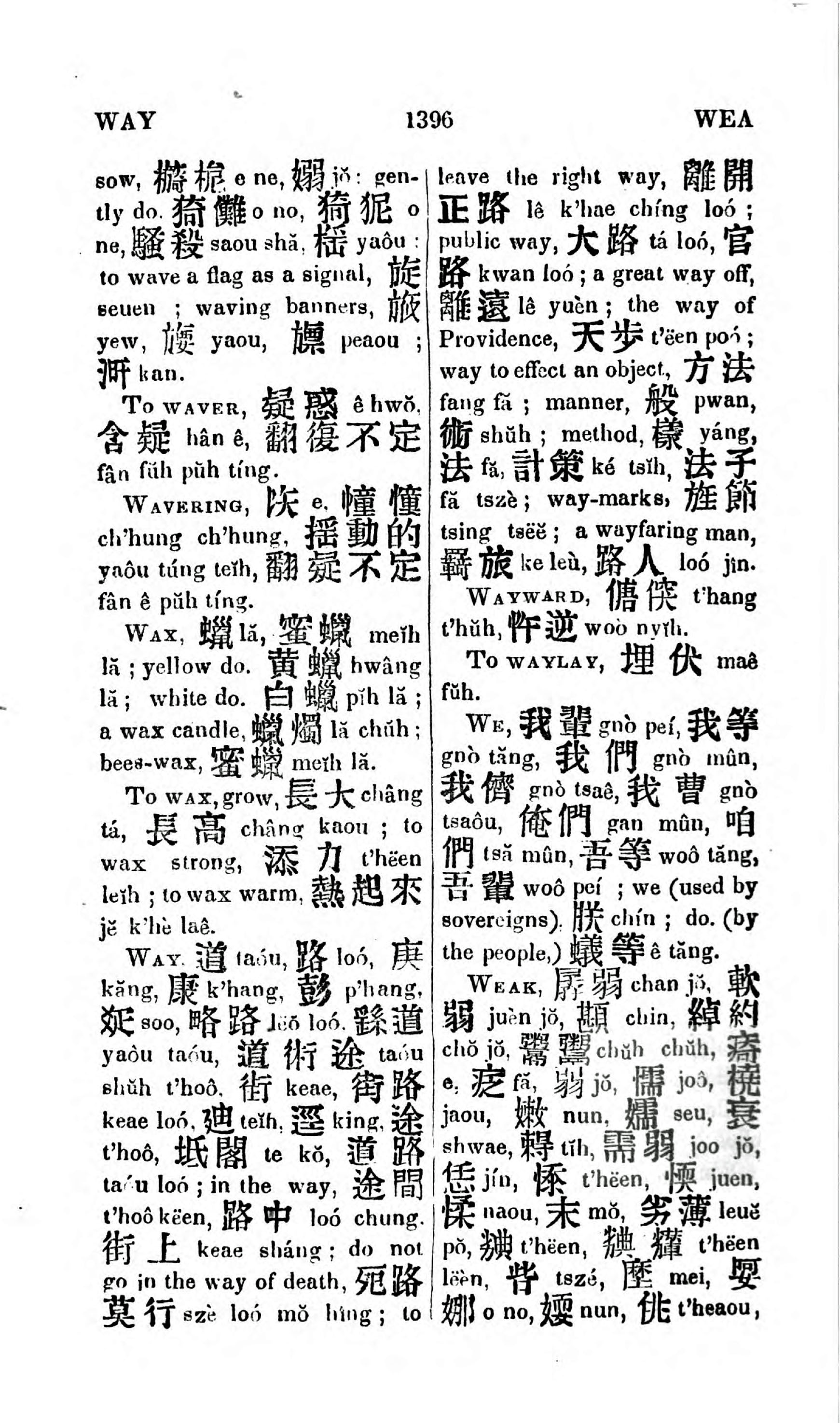
Sample page from Medhurst's English and Chinese Dictionary

The Mission Press in Shanghai published Medhurst's English and Chinese dictionary in two volumes in 1847 and 1848, respectively. Publishing 600 copies of this 1,436-page dictionary was the largest work of the mission in its hand-press period.

Owing to Medhurst's disappointment with the low quality results from combining typography and lithography to print Chinese characters for the Chinese and English Dictionary, he decided to use letterpress printing for the English and Chinese Dictionary, which required the cutting of small type. The LMS had previously used small type to print Christian translations and tracts that were smuggled into China, where they were forbidden. In Shanghai, Medhurst employed Chinese workers to punchcut moveable-type Chinese characters on blank shanks, "about 15,000 sorts, and nearly 100,000 individual types" that were required for the dictionary.

For the bilingual sources of his English–Chinese dictionary, Medhurst says he extracted "all that he thought serviceable from Morrison" and an anonymous Latin-Chinese manuscript dictionary—presumably the Italian Franciscan Basilio Brollo's (1698) Dictionarium Sino-Latinum—"while he flatters himself that he has gone far beyond either of his predecessors, in the amount of foreign words adduced, and of expressions brought together to elucidate them.".

Volume I (1847) has a 6-page preface, 2-page summary of orthographic conventions, and the 766-page dictionary proper. The entries begin with "A, the letter a; the broad and open sound of this letter is expressed by 亞 a [yà], or 阿 a [ā]." and end with "KORAN, the Mahomedans, call the Koran 天經 t'hëen king [tiānjīng]."

Volume II (1848) of Medhurst's English–Chinese dictionary comprises 669 pages. The entries go from "LABEL, 帖 t'ëĕ [tiè]; the label of a book, 檢 këen [jiǎn]." To "ZONE, 帶 taé [dài], 束腰之帶 shǔ yaou che taé [shùyāo zhī dài], 腰帶 yaou taé [yāodài], 地球道 té k'hêu taóu [dìqiúdào]."

The sample page (to the right) contains Medhurst's dictionary entry for WAY.

Way. 道 Taóu, 路 loó, 庚 käng, 康 k'hang, 彭 p'hang, 疏 sоо, 略路 lëǒ loó, 繇道 yaòu taóu, 道術途 taóu shǔh t'hoô, 街 keae, 街路 keae loó, 迪 teĭh, 逕 king, 途 t'hoô, 坻閣 te kǒ, 道路 taóu loó; in the way, 途間 t'hoô këen, 路中 loó chung, 街上 keae sháng; do not go in the way of death, 死路莫行 szè loó mǒ hing; leave the right way, 離開正路 lê k'hae chíng loó; public way, 大路 tá loó, 官路 kwan loó; a great way off, 離遠 lê yuèn; the way of Providence, 天步 t'ёеп poó; way to effect an object, 方法 fang fǎ; manner, 般 pwan, 術 shǔh; method, 樣法 yang fǎ, 計策 ké tsĭh, 法子 fǎ tszè; way-marks, 旌節 tsing tsëĕ; a wayfaring man, 羇旅 ke leù, 路人 loó jin.

The first part of the WAY headword gives 16 translation equivalents of Chinese words meaning "way". This illustrates how one single English headword can have ten or more Chinese translation equivalents, which Medhurst ascribes to either "the richness of the Chinese language, in certain particulars", or to "the inability of the compiler (from want of time and skill) to discover the slight shades of meaning that exist among them". Most of these equivalents are common terms, such as 道 taóu (dào "way; road; path), 路 loó (lù "road; path; way"), and 途 t'hoô (tú "road; route; way"), but some are obscure classical Chinese terms, such as dǐgé 坻閣, which the Kangxi zidian (s.v., 閣) notes was the name of a road mentioned in commentaries to the Rites of Zhou (野廬氏). The second part of the WAY headword gives translations of 11 usage examples, for instance, "public way, 大路 tá loó, 官路 kwan loó" (dàlù "big street; main road; highway" and guānlù "government-financed road; public road", respectively).

== Reception ==
Scholars have expressed diverse opinions of Walter Henry Medhurst's Chinese–English and English–Chinese dictionaries.

The first published evaluation of the (1842–1843) Chinese and English Dictionary was an anonymous 1843 review in The Chinese Repository, which was a Protestant missionary periodical published in Canton. On the one hand, the reviewer praises the dictionary's portability and price, "two octavo volumes containing 1500 pages for ten dollars", but on the other, expresses regret that Medhurst "has said so little on the subject of tones" other than "that he considers them of paramount importance".

Based upon comparison of the entries under Radical 46 山 "mountain" in Morrison's and Medhurst's Chinese–English dictionaries, the reviewer said, "If Mr. Medhurst does not improve upon himself, he improves vastly upon Dr. Morrison".

The next major Chinese–English dictionary after Medhurst's was the American sinologist and missionary Samuel Wells Williams's (1874) A Syllabic Dictionary of the Chinese Language. The preface says that although many similar Chinese–English dictionaries by Medhurst, Elijah Coleman Bridgman, and others were published in small numbers, they became "very scarce, while the number of students has increased tenfold", and learners of Chinese relied on reprints of Morrison's dictionary. Williams explicitly identified "Dr. Medhurst's translation of the K'anghi Tsz'tien" as a more important source for his own work than Morrison's dictionary.

The preface to the British diplomat and sinologist Herbert Giles's A Chinese–English Dictionary praised Morrison as "the great pioneer" of Chinese and English lexicography, but criticized his failure to mark aspiration. He said Medhurst "attempted aspirates, but omitted many and wrongly inserted others".

Huiling Yang, a researcher at Beijing Foreign Studies University, expresses surprise that the Chinese and English Dictionary, which Medhurst claimed to be his translation based on Kangxi zidian, "is in fact just an abbreviated and edited copy of Morrison’s, a plagiarism rather than an original compilation".
