= John Armstrong (artist) =

English painter (1893-1973)

- Born: John Rutherford Armstrong; 14 November 1893; Hastings, Sussex
- Died: 19 May 1973 (aged 79); Putney, London
- Education: St. John's College, Oxford; St John's Wood Art School
- Known for: Painting, design work

John Rutherford Armstrong ARA (14 November 1893 – 19 May 1973) was a British artist and muralist who also designed for film and theatre productions. He is most notable for the Surrealist paintings he produced.

== Life and work ==
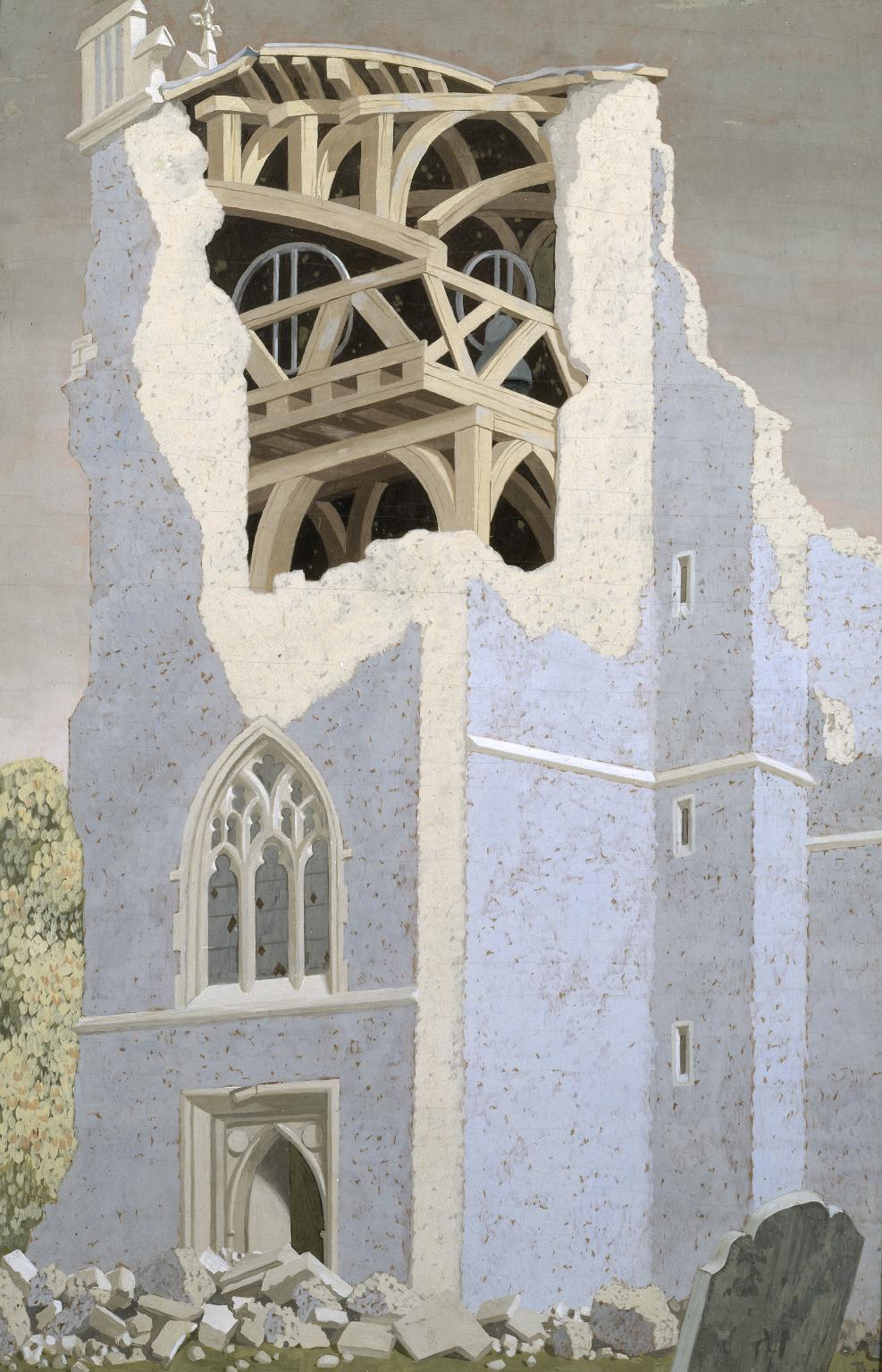
Coggeshall Church, Essex, (1940), (Tate)

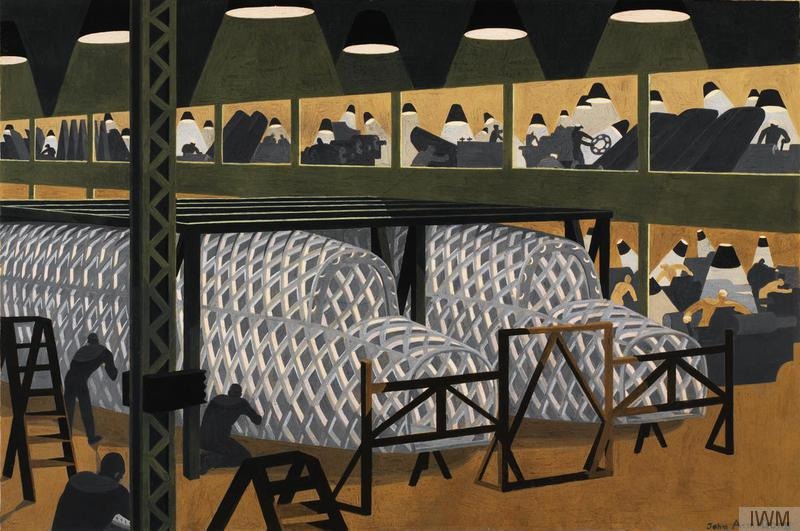
Building Planes, 1940, (Art.IWM ART LD 6390)

Armstrong was born in Hastings in Sussex. His father was a clergyman and Armstrong was educated at St. Paul's School in London. He studied law at St. John's College, Oxford, but switched to art and became a student at St John's Wood Art School throughout 1913 and 1914. Armstrong served with some distinction in the Royal Field Artillery in Salonika during World War One before returning briefly to complete his studies at St John's Wood Art School. After a period of some economic hardship, Armstrong began to build a career as a theatre designer in London and to gain a client base for his artworks. He received a commission to decorate a room in the Portman Square home of the art collector Samuel Courtauld, and also painted a frieze for the ballroom at 1 Kensington Palace Gardens.

Armstrong held his first solo exhibition in 1928 at the Leicester Galleries in London. In 1933 he joined Unit One and displayed a set of semi-abstract paintings at their one, extended, exhibition. Throughout the 1930s Armstrong continued to work as a designer as he also continued to develop his art. He produced a number of remarkable posters for Shell and also produced four posters for the General Post Office. Armstrong designed a number of book covers for the Hogarth Press, including for William Plomer's Sado published in 1931. He worked on the first production of the ballet Façade and on a number of Alexander Korda's film productions, designing costumes for The Private Life of Henry VIII, Rembrandt and I Claudius. In 1938 Armstrong held an exhibition at the Lefevre Gallery which featured Surrealist works set in English landscapes such as Dreaming Head. Pro Patria, also from 1938, is Armstrong's comment on the Spanish Civil War.

During World War Two, Armstrong worked as an official war artist undertaking short contracts for the War Artists' Advisory Committee, WAAC. In paintings such as The Elms and A Farm in Wales he recorded bomb damage to buildings such as churches and cottages showing broken walls and empty rooms open to the elements. Whilst other artists, including John Piper, praised these works they were criticized by the art critic Eric Newtown in the Sunday Times as being superficial. Several works by Armstrong were included in the WAAC Britain at War exhibition held at the Museum of Modern Art in New York in May 1941.

After the War Armstrong turned away from surrealism and towards the greater use of symbols in his paintings. He produced a series of large symbolic works including The Storm, for the Festival of Britain, The Battle of Propaganda, The Battle of Money and Victory, the last of which imagined the results of a nuclear attack. The painting was shown at the Royal Academy in 1958 and attracted considerable public attention. In 1955 he designed and painted the ceiling of the Council Chamber for the City Hall, Bristol and also created a light-hearted mural, The Fantastic Park, for the Royal Marsden Hospital in Surrey. Battle of the Rocking Horse, 1953, rejects the idea of nobility in warfare by showing clowns fighting amongst themselves with wooden swords.

Armstrong was elected an associate member of the Royal Academy in 1966 and, despite developing Parkinson's disease, he continued to paint and travel until his death in London in 1973. A memorial exhibition for Armstrong was held at the Royal Academy in 1975.
