= Unit One =

- Years active: 1933–1935
- Location: United Kingdom
- Major figures: Wells Coates; Paul Nash; Henry Moore; Ben Nicholson

Unit One was a British grouping of Modernist artists founded by Paul Nash. The group included painters, sculptors and architects, and was active from 1933 to 1935. It held one exhibition, which began at the Mayor Gallery in Cork Street, London, and then went on an extended tour, closing in Belfast in 1935. The artists planned the group at meetings held at the Mayor Gallery; Paul Nash announced its creation in a letter to The Times on 12 June 1933. A book by Herbert Read, Unit One: the modern movement in English painting, sculpture, and architecture, was published at the time of the exhibition. Despite its brief period of activity, the group is regarded as influential in establishing the pre-eminence of London as a centre of modernist and abstract art and architecture in the mid-1930s.

== Members ==
The artists of the group were: the architects Wells Coates and Colin Lucas; the painters John Armstrong, John Bigge, Edward Burra, Frances Hodgkins, Paul Nash, Ben Nicholson and Edward Wadsworth; and the sculptors Barbara Hepworth and Henry Moore. Frances Hodgkins soon left the group and was replaced by Tristram Hillier.
