= Luzhi =

Luzhi Town 甪直镇
- Town
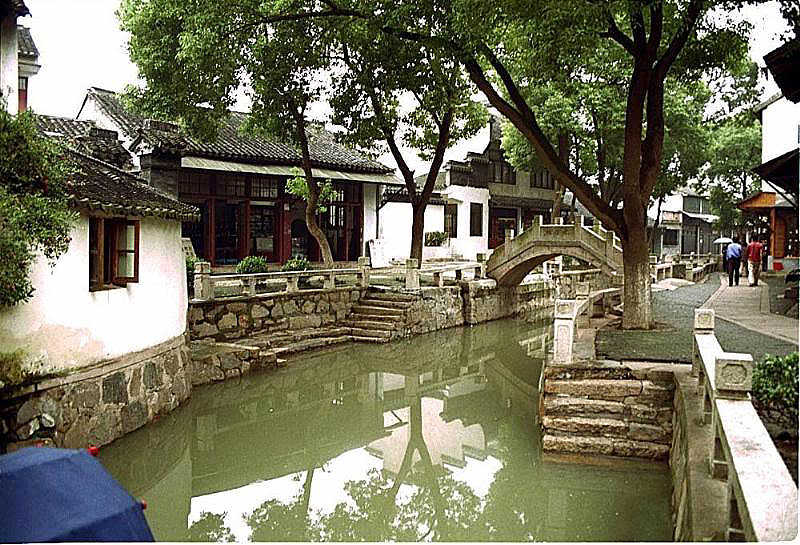
- Canal in Luzhi

- Location in Jiangsu Luzhi Town (China)
- Coordinates: 31°16′29″N 120°52′45″E
- Country: People's Republic of China
- Province: Jiangsu
- Prefecture-level city: Suzhou
- District: Wuzhong

Area
  - Total: 75 km^{2} (29 sq mi)

Population (2014)
  - Total: 200,000
  - Density: 2,700/km^{2} (6,900/sq mi)
- Time zone: UTC+8 (China Standard)
- Postal code: 215127
- Area code: 0512

A street in Luzhi

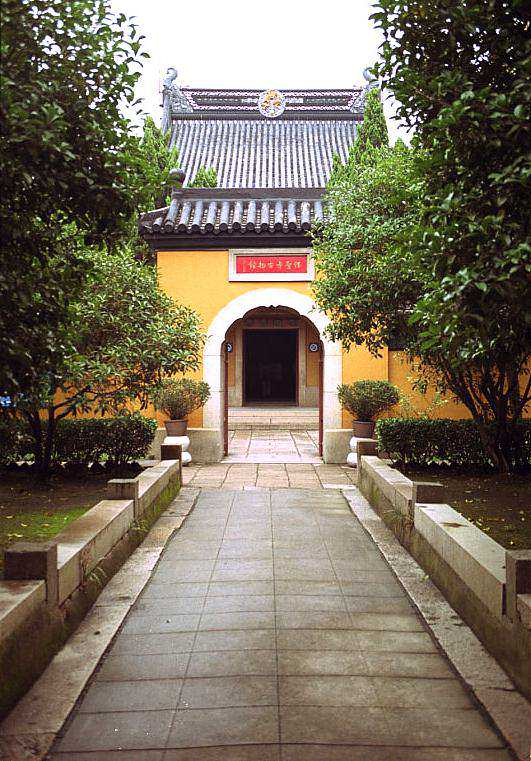
Baoshen Temple

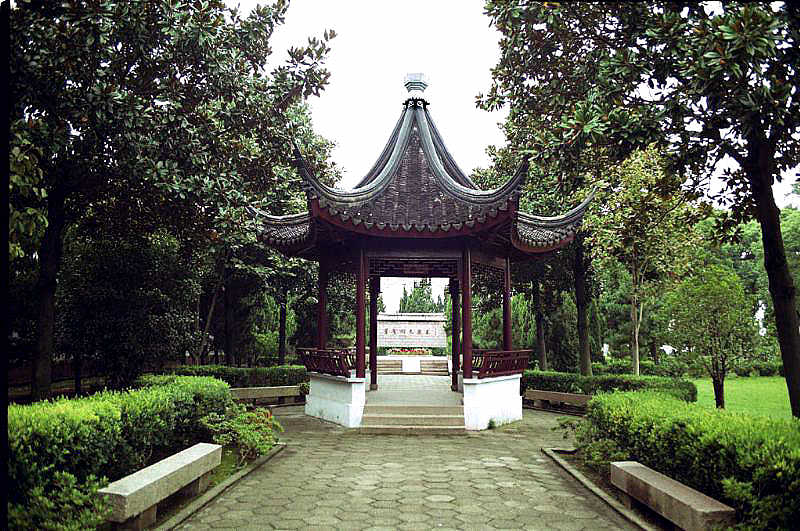
Ye Shengtao Memorial Park

Luzhi Town (Chinese: 甪直镇; pinyin: Lùzhí Zhèn) is a historic town located in the Wuzhong District, 18 km east of Suzhou, Jiangsu province, China.

== History ==
Luzhi was also known as Puli (甫里), after the pseudonym of the Tang dynasty recluse poet Lu Guimeng who retired in this town.

Puli consisted of two districts: Puli (甫里) and Liuzhi (六直), which was pronounced Luzhi in the Suzhou dialect. The name Liuzhi referred to the six straight rivers in the town. At the end of the Qing dynasty, Puli was renamed to Luzhi township of Yuanhe County.

Luzhi is known for its waterways and ancient bridges, with some bridges dating back to the Song dynasty.

The Ming dynasty poet Gao Qi described Luzhi in a poem :

Scene of Puli
Long bridge short bridge with willows
Front stream rear stream with lotus
People watching banner over wine store risen
Seagulls escort boat to home of fishman.

Luzhi is a well-preserved old town. In 2003, it was listed as one of the "Ten Famous Chinese Historical Townships" by the Chinese government. In 2004, Luzhi was awarded a Township Preservation Award by UNESCO.

== Points of interest ==
- Baosheng Temple, a Buddhist temple built in the second year of Tianjiang of the Liang dynasty (503 AD). By the Song dynasty, it had 5000 halls and one thousand monks. Its arhat statues, sculpted by Yang Huizhi in the Tang dynasty, are national treasures.
- Tomb of Tang dynasty poet Lu Guimong, includes Fare Breeze Pavilion and two of his hand planted ginkgo trees.
- Former residence of Shen Bohan (沈柏寒故居)
- Wang Tao Memorial Hall
- Ye Shengtao Memorial Hall, at the former site of 5th High School, where educator and writer Ye Shengtao taught from 1917 to 1922.

== Food ==
- Puli trotters (甫里蹄) and Puli duck (甫里鸭), said to be prepared according to the recipe of poet Mr. Pu-li; he often treated guests with these two dishes.
- Luzhi radish (甪直萝卜), a radish pickle with a Qing dynasty recipe

== Notable people ==
- Lu Guimeng: Tang dynasty poet with the pseudonym Mr. Puli (甫里先生).
- Pi Rixiu: Tang dynasty poet, contemporary of Lu Guimeng
- Gao Qi: Ming dynasty poet
- Wang Tao: Qing dynasty reformer, writer, newspaper publisher
- Ye Shengtao: prominent novelist and educator.

== Transportation ==
- Buses between
  - Luzhi and Suzhou, route 18.
  - Luzhi and Kunshan
  - Luzhi and Shanghai.
- Steam boats between
  - Luzhi and Suzhou
  - Luzhi and Kunshan
