= Lu Guimeng =

Chinese poet

Lu Guimeng (simplified Chinese: 陆龟蒙; traditional Chinese: 陸龜蒙; pinyin: Lù Guīmēng; Wade–Giles: Lu Kui-meng; died 881), courtesy name Luwang (鲁望), was a recluse Chinese poet of the Tang dynasty. He lived in seclusion at Puli near Suzhou. His pseudonyms included Mr. Fuli (甫里先生), Tiansuizhi (天隨子), and Jianghu Sanren (江湖散人).

He and his friend, the fellow poet Pi Rixiu, created a new style of matching rhyme poetry. One of them would compose a poem, and the other would then reply with a new poem using the same rhyme. His works included:

- Songlin Ji (松陵集), a collection of matching rhyme poems by Lu and Pi Rixiu
- Fuli Ji (甫里集), Collection of Fuli
- The Classic of the Plough, a book that described in detail the curved iron plough

== Tomb ==
Lu Guimeng's tomb is near the Baoshen temple in Luzhi, Suzhou. Two tall ginkgo trees nearby were hand-planted by him and still stand today. The Fair Breeze Pavilion was reputed to be his favourite place for study and meeting friends.
