= The Classic of the Plough =

- Author: Lu Kuei-Meng (陸龜蒙)
- Language: Chinese
- Publication date: c. 880 AD

The Classic of the Plough (Chinese: 耒耜經; Pinyin: lěisì jīng) is a classical Chinese text written by Lu Kuei-Meng (陸龜蒙) in c. 880 AD. He describes the curved iron plough that had been introduced in the Tang dynasty. His description would be used for ploughs in agricultural encyclopedias for several centuries. He describes each part of the plough and gives its dimensions with enough information for a replica plough to be constructed.
