= Walter Hillier =

British diplomat (1849–1927)

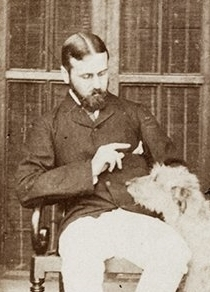
- Born: 1849; Hong Kong
- Died: November 9, 1927 (aged 77–78)
- Occupations: Diplomat, sinologist, professor

Sir Walter Caine Hillier KCMG CB (1849 – 9 November 1927) was a British diplomat, academic, author, Sinologist and Professor of Chinese at King's College London.

== Early life ==
Walter Hillier was born in Hong Kong but educated in England, at Bedford School and at Blundell's School, Tiverton. His father was Charles Batten Hillier, Chief Magistrate, Hong Kong, and British Consul at Bangkok and his mother, Elizabeth, daughter of missionary Walter Medhurst. He was the brother of Edward Guy Hillier, one of the most respected bankers at the Hongkong & Shanghai Bank and its long-term manager in Peking (1889-1924).

== Diplomatic career ==
- 1867: Appointment to the Consular Service and service as an interpreter in China (followed by various promotions)
- 1879: Assistant Chinese Secretary in Peking (in 1883 accompanying Sir Harry Parkes to negotiate the treaty with Korea)
- 1885: Chinese Secretary
- 1889–1896: Consul-General in Seoul.

== Later career ==
Hillier retired in October 1896 and, from February to April 1901, was attached to the Legation in Peking as special political officer for Chinese affairs with the rank of acting First Secretary in the Diplomatic Service. This involved his appointment as adviser to the military authorities in China at which time he was Mentioned in despatches. A stone memorial was erected to Hillier and to a British military officer at Shan-hai-Kwan to recognise the protection afforded to Chinese during the times following the Boxer Rebellion. From 1904–1908, Hillier was Professor of Chinese at King's College London. From 1908–1910, Hillier served as an adviser to the Chinese government, in particular advising Li Hung-chan during his time as Viceroy of Zhili.

== Selected works ==
- The Chinese Language and How to Learn It: A Manual for Beginners (1907)
- An English-Chinese Dictionary of Peking Colloquial (1910)
- Memorandum Upon an Alphabetical System for Writing Chinese: the Application of this System to the Typewriter and to the Linotype or other Typecasting and Composing Machines and its Application to the Braille System for the Blind (1927)

== See also ==
- List of Ambassadors from the United Kingdom to Korea
