= Baosheng Temple =

Buddhist temple

- 保圣寺
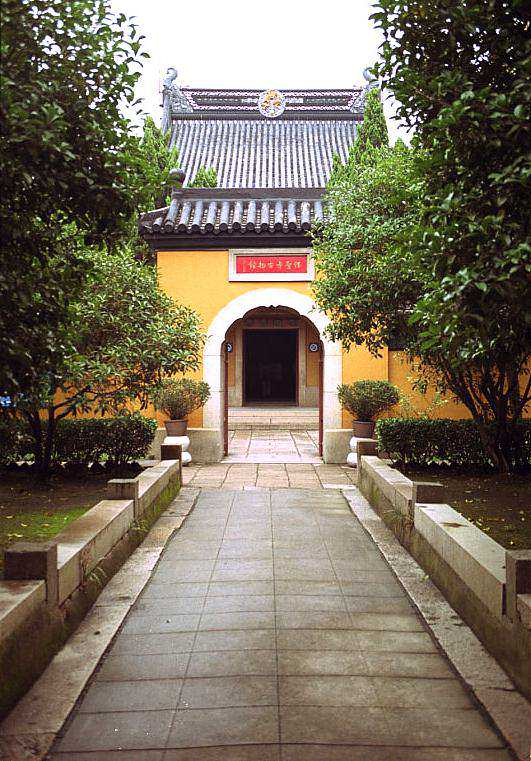
- Baosheng Temple.

- Location within Jiangsu

Religion
- Affiliation: Buddhism
- Deity: Chan Buddhism

Location
- Location: Luzhi, Wuzhong District, Suzhou, Jiangsu
- Country: China
- Interactive map of Baosheng Temple
- Coordinates: 31°16′32″N 120°52′41″E

Architecture
- Style: Chinese architecture
- Established: 503
- Completed: 1932 (reconstruction)

Baosheng Temple (simplified Chinese: 保圣寺; traditional Chinese: 保聖寺; pinyin: bǎoshèng Sì) is a Buddhist temple located in the town of Luzhi, in Wuzhong District of Suzhou, Jiangsu. It is dubbed "one of the top 4 Buddhist temples of Jiangnan region".

== History ==
The original temple dates back to early 6th century, in China's Liang dynasty (502–557), it has a history of more than 1510 years. Xiao Yan, an emperor of the Liang dynasty and a devout Buddhist, went in for large-scale construction of Buddhist temples. Baosheng Temple is the architecture from that period. In its heyday, it had more than 5,000 halls and rooms as well as thousands of monks, and its area covers half the town.

In the summer of 1918, Ye Shengtao invited Gu Jiegang to the temple and they founded the clay statues of the Eighteen Arhats were made by a famous sculptor named "Yang Huizhi" (杨惠之) in the Tang dynasty (618–907). They wrote articles in newspapers and magazines calling for the protection of these cultural relics, but they didn't attract the attention of the local government.

In 1928, half of the Mahavira Hall collapsed for neglect, 9 statues of the Eighteen Arhats were demolished. Two years later, architect Fan Wenzhao designed and built the Arhat Hall to house the remaining statues of Eighteen Arhats.

During the Second Sino-Japanese War, the Imperial Japanese Army invaded the temple and smashed the clay statues of the Four Heavenly Kings.

In 1961, the arhat statues of Baosheng Temple were listed among the first batch of "Major National Historical and Cultural Sites" by the State Council of China.

== National treasures ==
The 9 statues of Eighteen Arhats created by Yang Huizhi of the Tang dynasty (618–907) are well preserved after a thousand years.

A stone Dhvajo named Zunsheng Tuoluoni Jingzhou (尊胜陀罗尼经咒) made in the Song dynasty (960–1279) is housed in the temple. Statues of Buddha and Buddhist sutras were carved on its surface.

An iron bell which was cast in late Ming dynasty (1368–1644) and early Qing dynasty (1644–1911) is collected in the temple.

The temple has a 1500-year-old and 50-metre (160 ft) tall ginkgo tree.
