= Gao Qi (Ming dynasty) =

Chinese poet (1336–1374)

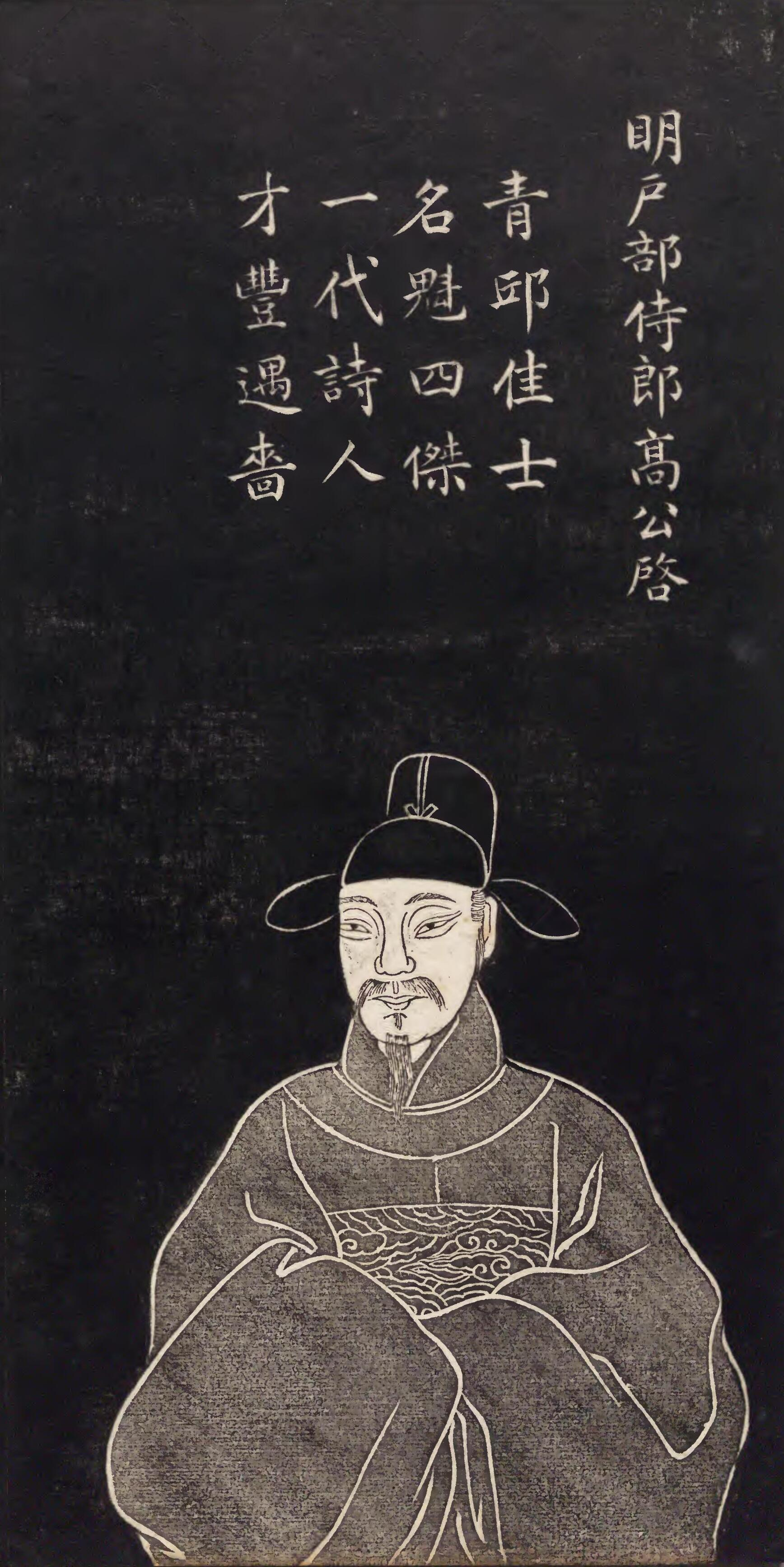
Gao Qi

Gao Qi (simplified Chinese: 高启; traditional Chinese: 高啟; pinyin: Gāo Qǐ, 1336–1374), courtesy name Jidi (季迪), pseudonym Qingqiuzi (青丘子), was a Chinese poet who lived in the early Ming dynasty. He is generally acknowledged as one of the greatest creators of Ming poetry. Gao Qi was born and raised in the shore of Wusong River, north of Puli Town near Suzhou. His life was much influenced by events arising in connection with the fall of the Yuan dynasty and the rise and establishment of the succeeding Ming dynasty.

During the reign of the Hongwu Emperor, Gao Qi was called on as editor of the historical text History of Yuan. Soon afterward, he was promoted to the post of deputy finance minister; but he declined, on pretext that he had no ability to manage finance. He retired to Blue Hill of Puli Town and taught students for a living. The Hongwu Emperor deemed him not cooperative; in 1374 he was accused of involvement in a "rebellion conspiracy" and was executed by being sliced into eight parts, at the age of 39 years old.

== Poems ==
Farm House
I heard the sound of a spinning wheel,
Mingled with sound of flowing water,
Sight of wooden bridge,
Flowerless trees in hazy spring,
Where from the aroma the breeze brought so close?
Ah, next neighbor is brewing afternoon tea!
(translated by Martin Tai, 1998)

== See also ==
- Yuan poetry
