= A Syllabic Dictionary of the Chinese Language =

A Syllabic Dictionary of the Chinese Language …
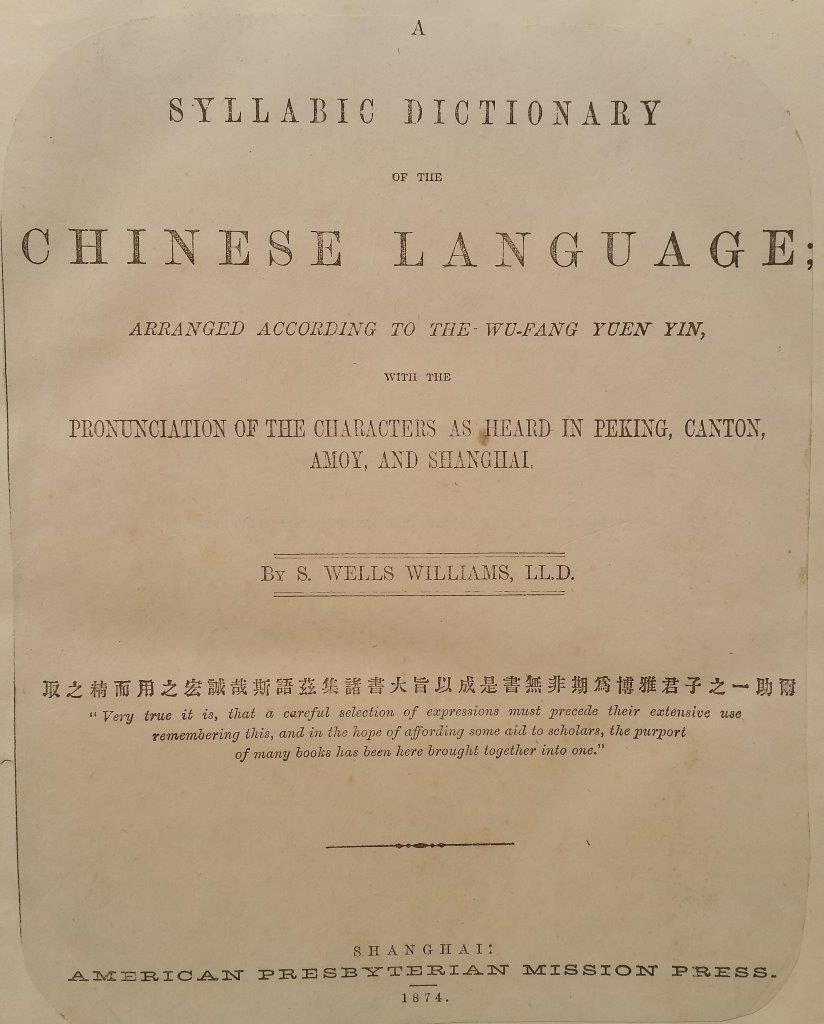
- Title page of Williams' Syllabic Dictionary (1874)
- Author: Samuel Wells Williams
- Language: Chinese, English
- Publisher: American Presbyterian Mission Press
- Publication date: 1874
- Publication place: China
- Media type: Print
- Pages: lxxxiv, 1150, appendices 1151-1254
- OCLC: 1921655
- Website: https://archive.org/details/syllabicdictiona00will

A Syllabic Dictionary of the Chinese Language: Arranged According to the Wu-Fang Yuen Yin, with the Pronunciation of the Characters as Heard in Peking, Canton, Amoy, and Shanghai or the Hàn-Yīng yùnfǔ 漢英韻府, compiled by the American sinologist and missionary Samuel Wells Williams in 1874, is a 1,150-page bilingual dictionary including 10,940 character headword entries, alphabetically collated under 522 syllables. Williams' dictionary includes, in addition to Mandarin, Chinese variants from Middle Chinese and four regional varieties of Chinese, according to the 17th-century Wufang yuanyin 五方元音 "Proto-sounds of Speech in All Directions".

== Title ==
The lengthy English title A Syllabic Dictionary of the Chinese Language: Arranged According to the Wu-Fang Yuen Yin, with the Pronunciation of the Characters as Heard in Peking, Canton, Amoy, and Shanghai refers to the influential rime dictionary of Chinese varieties compiled by Fan Tengfeng 樊騰鳳 (1601-1664), the Wufang yuanyin 五方元音 "Proto-sounds of Speech in All Directions". A Chinese rime dictionary (as differentiated from a rhyming dictionary) collates characters according to the phonological model of a rime table, arranged by initials, finals, and the classical four tones of Middle Chinese pronunciation.

The Chinese title Hàn-Yīng yùnfǔ 漢英韻府 (lit. "Chinese-English Rime Dictionary") combines two words that commonly occur in dictionary titles. Hàn-Yīng 漢英 means "Chinese-English" and yùnfǔ 韻府 (lit. "rime storehouse") means "rime dictionary". For example, the Yuan dynasty (c. 1280) Yunfu qunyu 韻府群玉 "Assembled Jade-tablets Rime Dictionary" compiled by Yin Shifu 陰時夫, the Qing dynasty (1711) Peiwen yunfu, and especially Morrison's A Dictionary of the Chinese Language Part II or Wuche yunfu 五車韻府 "Erudite Rime Dictionary".

== History ==
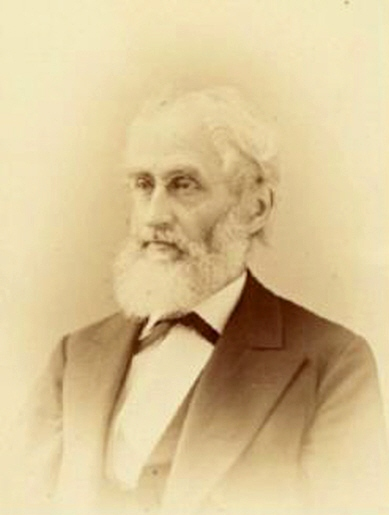
Photograph of Samuel Wells Williams

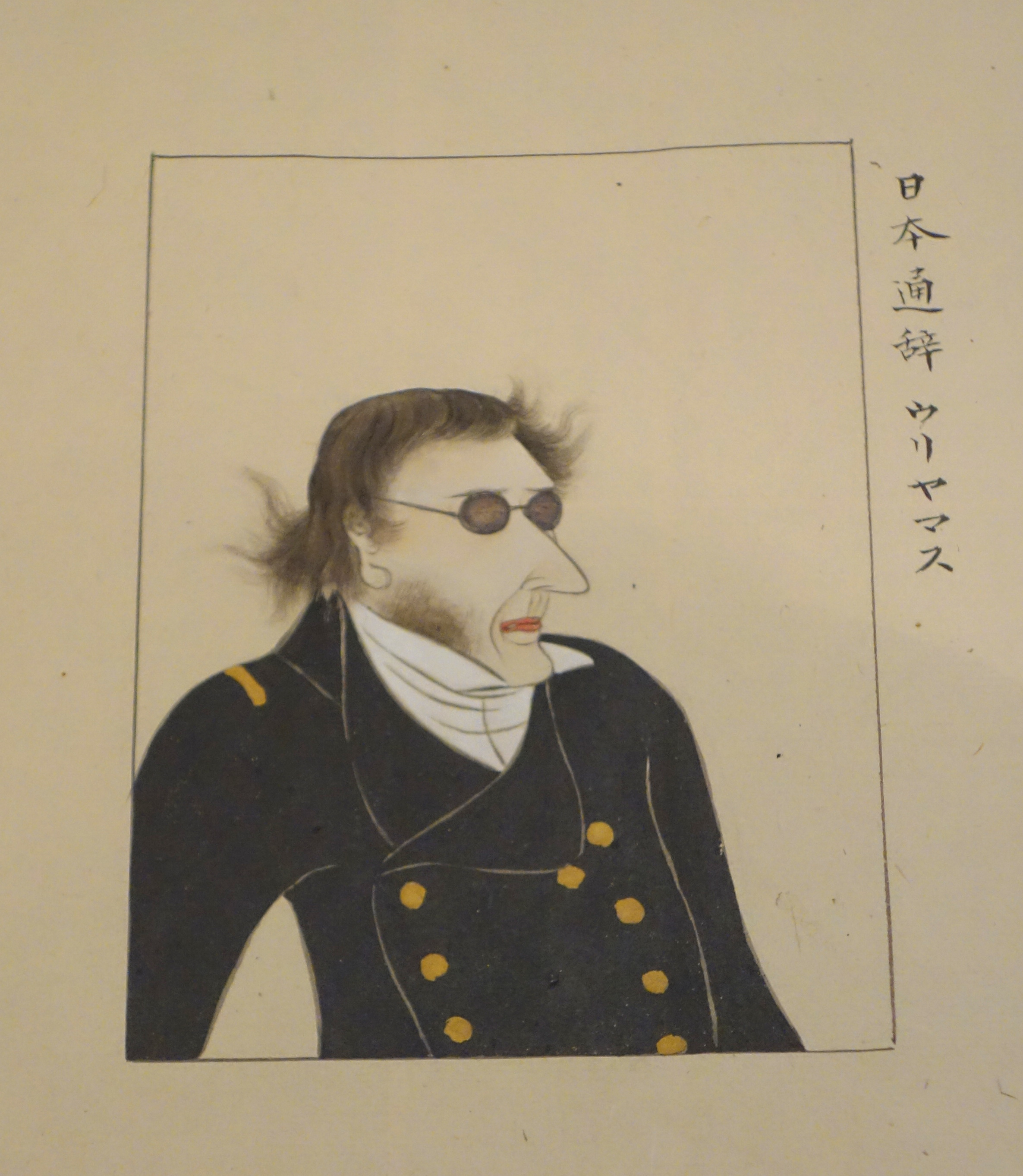
Woodblock caricature of Samuel Wells Williams by the Japanese artist Hibata Ōsuke 樋畑翁輔,1854

Samuel Wells Williams (1812-1884), known as Wèi Sānwèi 衛三畏 in Chinese (Wei 衛 is a surname), was an American missionary, diplomat, and sinologist. In 1833, the American Board of Commissioners for Foreign Missions sent Williams to manage their printing press of at Canton (present-day Guangzhou) China. After a productive 40 years spent in China, Williams returned to the United States in 1877 and became the first Professor of Chinese language and literature at Yale University.

Williams was a prolific writer, translator, lexicographer, and editor. For English-speaking students of Chinese as a foreign language, he wrote Easy Lessons in Chinese: or Progressive Exercises to Facilitate the Study of that Language. Prior to compiling A Syllabic Dictionary of the Chinese Language, he published two specialized dictionaries. The (1844) An English and Chinese Vocabulary in the Court Dialect, or Ying Hwá Yun-fú Lih-kiái 英華韻府歷階 "English-Chinese Mandarin Rime Dictionary", was intended to replace Morrison's (1828) Vocabulary of the Canton Dialect: Chinese Words and Phrases, which was out-of-print. "Court Dialect" refers to guānhuà 官話 (lit. "official speech") or the late imperial Mandarin koiné spoken in Beijing. Williams' (1856) A Tonic Dictionary of the Chinese Language in the Canton Dialect or ˌYing ˌWá ˌFan Wanˈ Ts'ütˌ Lúˈ 英華分韻提要 ("English-Chinese Summary of Tonal Divisions") includes 7,850 characters commonly used in Cantonese.

Samuel Williams spent 11 years compiling A Syllabic Dictionary of the Chinese Language. The dictionary preface explains that he first planned to rearrange A Tonic Dictionary of the Chinese Language in the Canton Dialect and "fit it for general use" but he soon realized that its "incompleteness required an entire revision". Williams began compilation in 1863, when he was chargé d'affaires for the United States in Beijing, and after realizing that foreigners required more than a wordlist of common Chinese terms, he decided to produce a successor to Morrison's dictionary.

Sources that Williams consulted include Part II of Morrison's dictionary, Gonçalves' (1833) Diccionario China-Portuguez, De Guignes' (1813) Dictionnaire Chinois, and his A Tonic Dictionary of Cantonese. Although he said, "Dr. Medhurst's translation of the K'anghi Tsz'tien" has been much used", the principal source for definitions was the original Kangxi zidian, which "imperfect as it is according to our ideas of a lexicon, is still the most convenient work of the kind in the language". The explanations of character origins ("etymological definitions") are taken from Sha Mu's 沙木 (1787) Yiwen beilan 藝文備覽 "Literary Writings for Consultance".

Samuel Williams describes the ideal Chinese bilingual dictionary.

The plan of a Chinese lexicon to satisfy all the needs of a foreigner, should comprise the general and vernacular pronunciations, with the tones used in various places, and the sounds given to each character as its meanings vary. The history and composition of the character, its uses in various epochs, and its authorized and colloquial meanings should be explained and illustrated by suitable examples. All this knowledge should be methodically arranged so as to be accessible with the least possible trouble. But even when arranged and ready, the foreigner would find it to be incomplete for all his purposes by reason of the local usages, ...

Yong and Peng interpret this desideratum as Williams' explanation for including regional pronunciation variants in A Syllabic Dictionary, and say, "As good as his intention was, it was highly doubtful whether he could achieve his goal.".

In an 1865 letter to his son, Williams compares working on the dictionary with his camel ride from Cairo to Gaza, a "monotonous travel through a dreary sameness, relieved by a few shrubs, and sometimes a flower", and says he finds Chinese literature so "destitute of imagination" that "making a dictionary to elucidate it is indeed a drudgery".

In November 1871, Williams traveled to Shanghai to oversee printing of the dictionary, and returned intermittently until publication in 1874. After thieves stole 250 stereotype printing plates of the dictionary from the Mission House in 1879, Williams made corrections and additions for the revised pages, which were used in a new 1881 edition. The American Presbyterian Mission Press continued to reprint Williams' original A Syllabic Dictionary for 30 years up until 1903.

In 1909, a revised edition that replaced Williams' romanization system with standard Wade-Giles was published

In the history of bilingual Chinese lexicography, Williams' A Syllabic Dictionary of the Chinese Language was published 51 years after Robert Morrison's 4,595-page Dictionary and 32 years after Walter Henry Medhurst's 1,486-page Dictionary. Williams adapted and incorporated from both dictionaries. Williams' 10,940 Chinese character head entries compare with the 12,674 numbered entries in Part II of Morrison's (1815-1823) A Dictionary of the Chinese Language, in Three Parts, which is likewise collated alphabetically by pronunciation of 411 syllables, and with the approximately 12,000 head entries in Medhurst's (1842) Chinese and English Dictionary: Containing All the Words in the Chinese Imperial Dictionary, Arranged According to the Radicals.

== Content ==
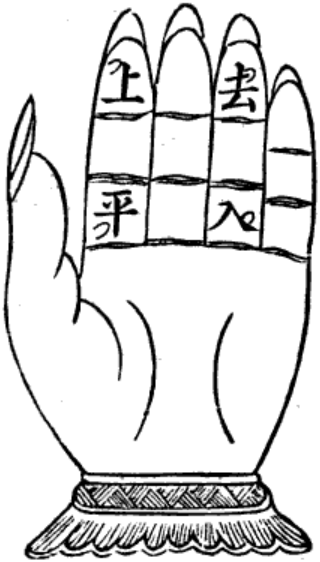
Traditional representation of the four tones on the hand

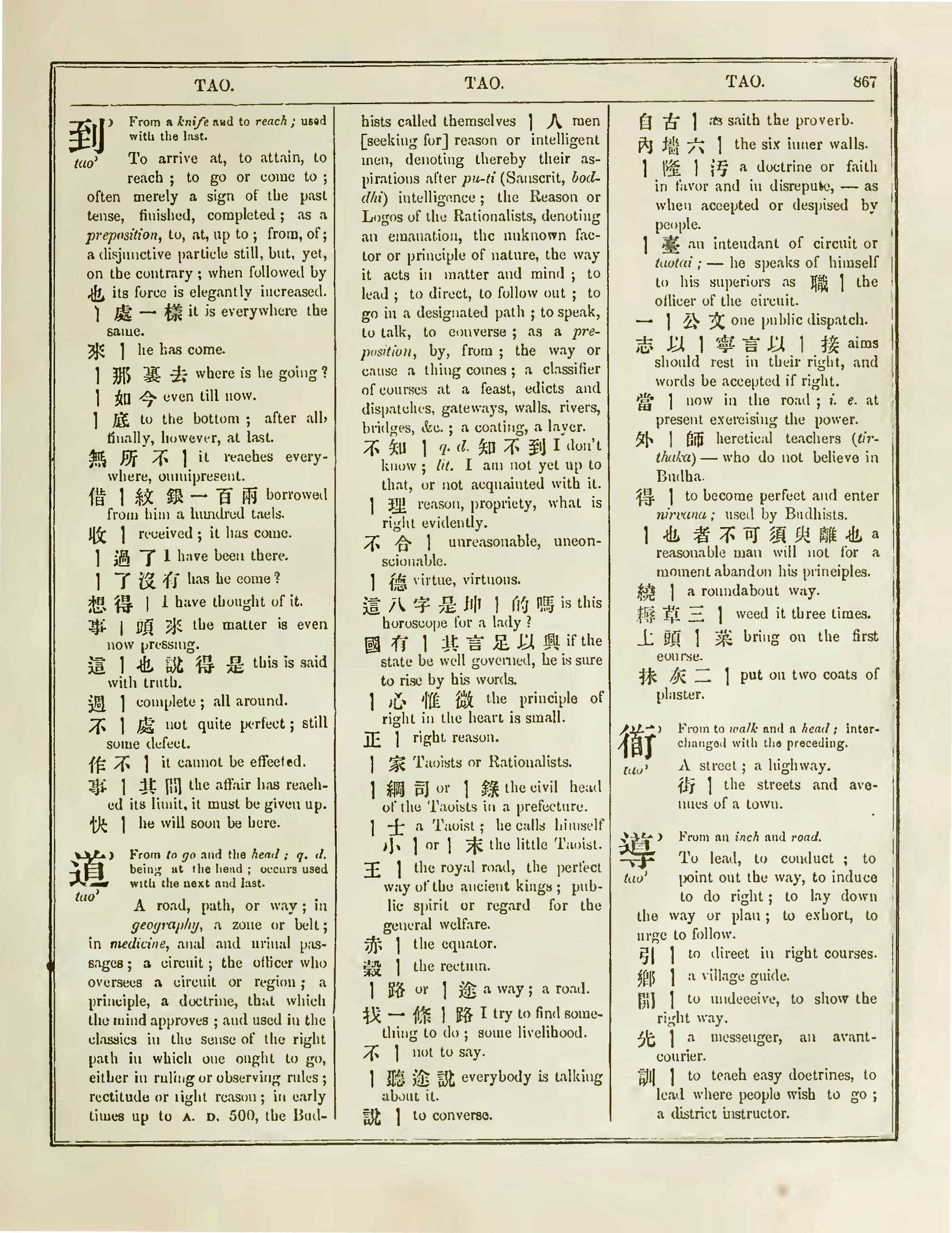
Sample page from Williams' Syllabic Dictionary (1896: 867)

The 1150-page Syllabic Dictionary is preceded by the front matter with a 6-page preface and an 84-page introduction. The latter introduces the Wufang yuanyin, orthography, aspiration, tones, Middle Chinese ("Old Sounds") pronunciations, the range of regional Chinese varieties, a table with 8 regional pronunciations of an extract from the (1724) Sacred Edict of the Kangxi Emperor, a table of the 214 Kangxi radicals, and a table of 1040 character phonetics ("primitives"), for example, [zhōng] 中 "middle", [shǎo] 少 "few", and [zhù] 宁 "vestibule".

Williams' preface to A Syllabic Dictionary of the Chinese Language explains, "The number of characters in this work is 12,527, contained in 10,940 articles, and placed under 522 syllables, which follow each other alphabetically, aspirated syllables coming after the unaspirated. Those syllables which begin with ts, on account of their number, are placed by themselves after tw'an". The additional 1,587 characters are differently written variant characters. For instance, the standard character 醫 for yī "medical doctor" has 酉 "wine vessel" indicating medicinal wine, but the earlier variant character 毉 has 巫 "Chinese shaman" indicating shamanic healing.

Rime dictionaries are arranged in terms of the classical four tones of Middle Chinese pronunciation: píng 平 "level" tone, shǎng 上 "rising" tone, qù 去 "departing" tone, and rù 入 "entering" tone. Most western-language dictionaries of Chinese represent tones by marking vowels with diacritics, Morrison's dictionary, for instance, indicates "level" tone as unmarked (a), "rising" with grave accent (à), "departing" with acute accent (á), and "entering" tone with "short accent" (ǎ). As a result of using 17th-century Wufang yuanyin pronunciations, early Chinese-English dictionaries were much concerned with the "entering" tone, which had already ceased to exist in 19th-century Beijing pronunciation.

Williams' dictionary represents the four tones in the same uncommon method as his Easy Lessons in Chinese: semicircles written in one of the four corners of a character (the linguistic term fāngkuàizì 方塊字, lit. "square character", means "Chinese character; square print") or pronunciation. He explains that Chinese schoolmasters mark the tone of every character in their students' printed books in order to facilitate reading aloud; with a semicircle in the character's lower left corner for "level" tone, in the upper left for "rising", in the upper right for "departing", and in the lower right for "entering" tone.

The head entry format in Williams' dictionary is the regular script character over the Peking Mandarin pronunciation (and an empty space "if one wishes to write the local sound beside the Pekingese"), both character and pronunciation are marked with a corner semicircle to indicate tone, an explanation of the character's origin, English translation equivalents, and usage examples (totaling about 53,000).

The Chinese character 道 for dào "way; path; say; the Dao" or dǎo "guide; lead; conduct; instruct; direct" (or 導 clarified with Radical 41 寸 "thumb; inch") is a good litmus test for a dictionary because it has two pronunciations and complex semantics. Williams dictionary sample entry 道ʼ, shown to the right) gives the regular script character over the taoʼ pronunciation gloss (both marked with a semicircle to the upper right indicating qù 去 "departing" tone), explanation of character origin, English translation equivalents, and usage examples.

The dictionary's phonological section headings are according to standard Beijing dialect pronunciation, and note variant ones from Middle Chinese ("Old sounds") and four regional varieties of Chinese spoken in Treaty ports where Protestant missionaries were active. "Swatow" or Shantou in Guangdong province refers to Shantou dialect, a Southern Min variety, "Amoy" or Xiamen in Fujian province to Amoy dialect, another Southern Min variety, also in Fujian province, "Fuchau" or Fuzhou refers to Fuzhou dialect, the prestige form of Eastern Min, and "Shanghai" to Shanghainese, a variety of Wu Chinese. Thus, the TAO heading says, "Old sounds, to, do, tot, and dok. In Canton, tò; – in Swatow, to and tau; – in Amoy, tò and tiau; – in Fuchau, to and t'o; – in Shanghai, to and do; – in Chifu, tao."

The logographic explanation of 道 (which combines Radical 162 辵 or 辶 "walk; go" and Radical 181 首 "head"; stroke order is animated here) says, "From to go and the head; q. d. being at the head"; and "occurs used with the next and last" refers to the subsequent two variant character entries, 衜 with Radical 144 行 "go" instead of Radical 162 "From to walk and a head; interchanged with the preceding", and 導 with Radical 41 "From an inch and road".

The 24 English translation equivalents include both common dào meanings and specialized ones in Chinese geography, traditional Chinese medicine, Chinese philosophy, Chinese Buddhism, Daoism (calling Daoists "Rationalists"), and Chinese grammar.

A road, path, or way; in geography, a zone or belt; in medicine, anal and urinal passages; a circuit; the officer who oversees a circuit or region; a principle, a doctrine, that which the mind approves; and used in the classics in the sense of the right path in which one ought to go, either in ruling or observing rules; rectitude or right reason; in early times up to A. D. 500, the Buddhists called themselves |人 men [seeking for] reason or intelligent men, denoting thereby their aspirations after pu-ti (Sanscrit, boddhi) intelligence; the Reason or Logos of the Rationalists, denoting an emanation, the unknown factor or principle of nature, the way it acts in matter and mind; to lead; to direct, to follow out; to go in a designated path; to speak, to talk, to converse; as a preposition, by, from; the way or cause a thing comes; a classifier of courses at a feast, edicts and dispatches, gateways, walls, rivers, bridges, &c.; a coating, a layer.

The entry's 39 word and usage examples—which use Morrison's "|" abbreviation for the head character 道—include common expressions (bùzhīdào 不知道 "I don't know", dàolù 道路 "a way; a road"), Chinese Christian expressions (zìgǔdào 自古道 "as saith the proverb"), Chinese Buddhist terms (dédào 得道 "to become perfect and enter nirvana; used by Buddhists [sic]"), and literary set phrases (Dàoxīn wéi wēi 道心惟微 "the principle of right in the heart is small" comes from the Book of Documents contrasting the 人心 "human heart-mind" and the 道心 "Way's heart-mind": "The mind of man is restless, prone (to err); its affinity to what is right is small".

== Reception ==
Scholars have both praised and criticized Williams’s dictionary. One of the first reviewers did both. Willem Pieter Groeneveldt praises Williams for "surpassing all those before him, he has given us a dictionary better than any existing before" and advises every student of Chinese to buy this "great boon to sinology"; and yet he criticizes Williams for including "fanciful" etymological definitions based on character components instead of scientific philology, the "indiscriminate introduction of the colloquial element", and presenting yet another new system of romanization.

The American missionary Henry Blodget's 1874 review in The New York Observer says, "this Dictionary, as a whole, is a treasury of knowledge in regard to China and Chinese affairs, a treasury accumulated by many years of study both of Protestant and Roman Catholic missionaries".

The British consular officer and linguist Herbert Giles published a 40-page brochure On some Translations and Mistranslations in Dr. Williams’ Syllabic Dictionary, saying that it is "though in many ways an improvement upon its predecessors, is still unlikely to hold the fort for any indefinitely long period". As an example, for Williams' translation of zhúfūrén 竹夫人 as "A long bamboo pillow", Giles gives, "Literally, a bamboo wife. A hollow cylindrical leg-rest, made of bamboo. Commonly known to Europeans as a 'Dutch wife'". However, Williams did not reply to Giles’ challenges, but consistently reprinted his dictionary until 1909. Giles criticized Williams as "the lexicographer not for the future but of the past", and took nearly twenty years to compile his (1892) A Chinese-English Dictionary.

Censuring Williams' dictionary for transliterating pronunciation from a "general average" of regional variants rather than Peking pronunciation, James Acheson wrote an index arranged according to Thomas Francis Wade's orthography, citing the frustration that many dictionary users who after "repeated failures to find the commonest characters without reference to the radical index or, failing here as often happens, to the List of Difficult Characters".

The American sinologist Jerry Norman credits Williams' A Syllabic Dictionary of the Chinese Language as apparently the first dictionary to properly distinguish between aspirated and unaspirated stops.

A recent book on Chinese lexicography says Williams' Syllabic Dictionary was the first dictionary of its kind to contain pronunciations from four regional varieties of Chinese: Pekingese, Cantonese, Xiamenese, and Shanghainese.

== Editions ==
- Williams, Samuel Wells (1874). A Syllabic Dictionary of the Chinese Language; Arranged According to the Wu-Fang Yuen Yin, with the Pronunciation of the Characters as Heard in Peking, Canton, Amoy, and Shanghai 漢英韻府. American Presbyterian Mission Press.
- —— (1903). A Syllabic Dictionary of the Chinese Language; Arranged According to the Wu-Fang Yuen Yin, with the Pronunciation of the Characters as Heard in Peking, Canton, Amoy, and Shanghai 漢英韻府. American Presbyterian Mission Press.
- —— (1909). A Syllabic Dictionary of the Chinese Language Arranged According to the Wu-Fang Yüan Yin. By S. Wells Williams, LL. D., and Alphabetically Rearranged According to the Romanization of Sir Thomas F. Wade, by a Committee of the North China Mission of the American Board. North China Union College.
