= William Charles Milne =

William Charles Milne (美魏茶 born April 22, 1815, died May 25, 1863) was a missionary to China in the 19th century. He was the son of missionary William Milne.

Milne was one of twins born on a ship on voyage from Canton to Malacca. He landed in China at age 2 with his parents. At age 4 he lost his mother。 In 1822, his father died: he was sent back to England, where he studied in Marischal College in Aberdeen, he graduated with a diploma, and was accepted into London Missionary Society and was appointed to China. On July 29, 1839, he left for China, accompanied by James Legge and Dr. Benjamin Hobson;they landed in Macao on December 18. From 1842 to 1842, he visited Ninpo and Zhoushan. He went to Hong Kong in August 1843, to attend the missionary conference of Hong Kong station. He also attended nearly all the Hong Kong meetings about the translation of Scripture. He with Walter Henry Medhurst and J. R. Morrison set up a committee to consult on the translation of names in the Scripture.

Milne returned to England to marry Frances Williamina in 1844. He went back to China with his wife in 1846 and landed in Shanghai on November 26. On the death of a delegate of Ninpo for the Bible Translation Committee, he was elected to fill the vacancy. At the completion of the translation of the New Testament, he was elected to continue as delegate for translation of the Old Testament, which was accomplished in 1852. He returned to England for health reasons. In 1856 he went back to China as interpreter of the consulate in Fuchow.

With the establishment of British Legation in Peking, Milne served as a tutor for the interpreters in the British civil service. He died of stroke on May 15, 1863; he was buried in an unconsecrated area of the Russian cemetery outside the Andingmen of Peking.
