= Edward Hillier =

British banker (1857–1924)

Edward Hillier CMG
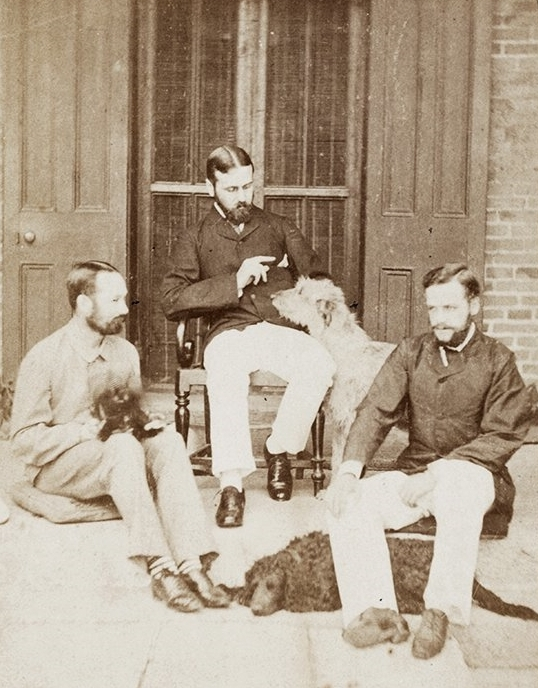
- Hillier (right) with his brothers Harry and Walter in 1880
- Born: March 11, 1857; Cambridge, United Kingdom
- Died: April 12, 1924 (aged 67); Peking, China
- Education: Trinity College, Cambridge
- Occupation: Banker
- Spouse(s): Ada Everett (m. 1894; died 1917), Eleanor Richard (m. 1919)
- Children: 4
- Relatives: Walter Hillier (brother)

Edward Guy Hillier (11 March 1857 – 12 April 1924) was a British banker. He spent over forty years working in China and played a significant role in Sino-foreign financial relations.

== Early life and education ==
Hillier was born on 11 March 1857 in Cambridge, the son Charles Batten Hillier, British consul to Siam. He was educated at Blundell's School, Tiverton and Trinity College, Cambridge.

== Career ==
After his first appointment in British North Borneo as private secretary to the Governor, Hillier left for Hong Kong in the early 1880s, and joined Jardine and Matheson & Co. Having learnt the Chinese language, he was offered a position at Hongkong and Shanghai Banking Corporation in 1883, and worked in Tientsin and Peking. In 1891, he was appointed the official agent at the bank's Peking branch where he remained for the rest of his career until his death in 1924.

Hillier led many negotiations connected with China's major borrowing during this period becoming, "the leading figure in all the more important transactions of foreign finance in China." This included the Chinese government loans issued in London and Berlin between 1895 and 1905; the Japanese War indemnity loans for 1896 and 1898 in the sum of £16 million each; the first British railway loan to China to complete the Peking-Mukden line; and the 1913 Reorganisation Loan of £25 million. In 1902, he also acted as British delegate to the Commission of Bankers for the Chinese indemnity, and in recognition of his services was created CMG in 1904.

Hillier's vision began to fail in 1896, and despite undergoing an operation in Europe, he became almost totally blind from 1900 onwards although he continued to represent the bank until his death.

== Personal life and death ==
Hillier married first Ada Everett in 1894, and they had one son and two daughters. His son died while serving during World War I. After his first wife died in 1917, he married Eleanor Richard in 1919. His brother Walter Hillier was a British diplomat.

Hillier died on 12 April 1924 in the German Hospital in Peking, aged 67.

== Honours ==
- Companion of the Order of St Michael and St George (CMG) in the 1904 Birthday Honours.
- Order of the Double Dragon, Third Class of the First Division, in 1905. "Conferred upon him by His Imperial Majesty the Emperor of China in recognition of valuable services rendered by him to the Imperial Railways of North China".
- Order of the Excellent Crop, Third Class, in 1914.
