= William Muirhead =

William Muirhead was a Protestant Christian missionary who served with the London Missionary Society during the late Qing Dynasty in China.

== Works authored or edited ==
- Hymns of Praise. 38 leaves. Shanghai, 1858. By Rev. William Muirhead. This is a collection of 100 hymns in the Shanghai dialect, prefaced by a statement of thirty principal doctrines of the Christian religion, with an elaborate detail of pertinent Scripture texts under each. A subsequent edition was published in 55 leaves.
- Salvation Hymns. 39 leaves. Shanghai, 1861. By Rev. William Muirhead. This is a collection of 69 hymns.
- Shanghai Hymn Book, 132 hymns, by William Muirhead, D.D. 1888.
