= Walter Henry Medhurst (consul) =

British diplomat

- Born: Walter Henry Medhurst; 1822; Batavia, Dutch East Indies (modern day Jakarta, Indonesia)
- Died: 1885 (aged 62–63); Torquay, United Kingdom

Sir Walter Henry Medhurst (1822–1885) was a British diplomat in China.

Being the son of the prominent British missionary Walter Henry Medhurst, the younger Medhurst was educated at Blundell's School and in Macau. There he acquired a good command of Chinese, Dutch and Malay. In October 1840, he was appointed Chinese secretary to the British superintendent of trade in China. He was sent along with other to inspect the newly-acquired colony of British Hong Kong in early 1841. During the Opium War, he worked under Rear-Admiral George Elliot and Sir Henry Pottinger.

In the following years, he held a number of important consular positions in Chinese treaty ports such as Fuzhou, Shanghai (as H.M. Consul), Hangzhou and Hankou. Medhurst distinguished himself as a prominent advocate of gunboat diplomacy to defend what he considered to be British interests in China.

Medhurst married three times, his third wife being Juliana Tryphena Burningham (1836-1881) whose son Walter Nowell Medhurst died of poisoning on Guernsey in 1880, at 17 years of age.

In 1868, Rutherford Alcock sent him to resolve the Yangzhou riot. He was criticized in Britain for his efforts.

Medhurst retired from consular service on 1 January 1877 and was knighted on 20 March the same year. In 1881, he took part in founding the British North Borneo Company and subsequently organized coolie trade to Borneo on behalf of the company, having moved back to Hong Kong in 1882, residing there for 18 months.

He moved back to England in 1884, and died at Torquay on 26 December 1885, leaving another son and at least two daughters.

== Sources ==
- C. A. Harris, "Medhurst, Sir Walter Henry (1822–1885)," rev. T. G. Otte, Oxford Dictionary of National Biography, Oxford University Press, 2004; online edn, May 2007, accessed 3 Aug 2007.
- F.J Snell, "The chronicles of Twyford, being a new and popular history of the town of Tiverton in Devonshire: with some account of Blundell's School founded A.D. 1604", Simpkin, Marshall, Hamilton, Kent & Co, Limited, 1892.
