= Walter Henry Medhurst =

English Congregationalist missionary (1796–1857)

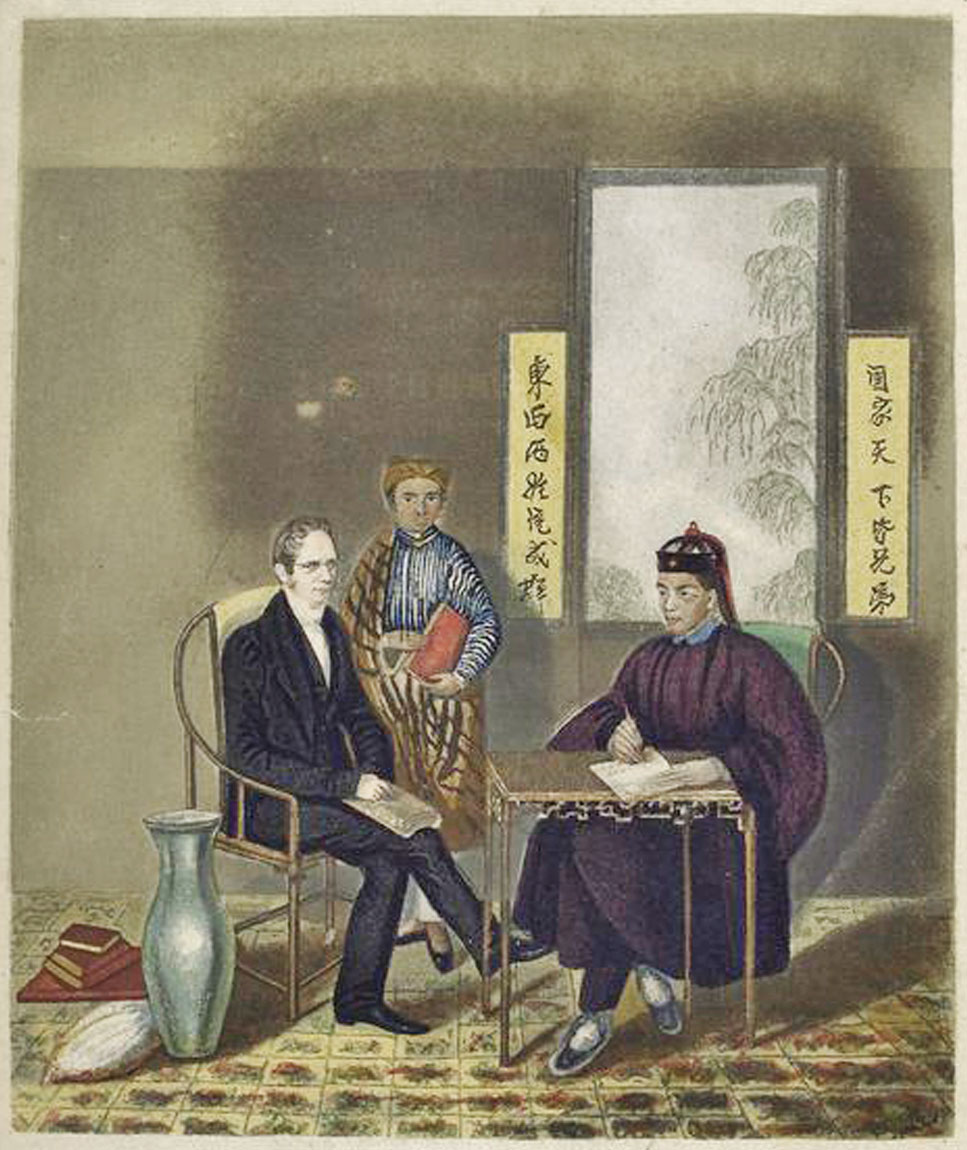
- Missionary Walter Medhurst with Choo Tih Lang and a Malay Boy
- Born: 29 April 1796; England
- Died: 24 January 1857 (aged 60); London, England

Chinese name
- Traditional Chinese: 麥都思
- Simplified Chinese: 麦都思
Transcriptions
Standard Mandarin
- Hanyu Pinyin: Mài Dūsī
- Wade–Giles: Mai^{4} Tu^{1}-ssu^{1}

Walter Henry Medhurst (29 April 1796 – 24 January 1857) was an English Congregationalist missionary to China, born in London and educated at St Paul's School. He was one of the early translators of the Bible into Chinese-language editions.

== Early life ==
Medhurst's father was an innkeeper in Ross-on-Wye, Herefordshire. As a young man, Medhurst studied at Hackney College under George Collison and he worked as a printer and typesetter at the Gloucester Herald and the London Missionary Society (LMS). He became interested in Christian missions and the LMS chose him to become a missionary printer in China. He sailed in 1816 to join their station at Malacca, which was intended to be a great printing centre. En route, he called at Madras where, in a little less than three months, he met Mrs Elizabeth Braune, née Martin (1794–1874), marrying her the day before he sailed to Malacca.

== Malacca and Shanghai ==
Having arrived in Malacca, Medhurst learned Malay, and studied Chinese, Chinese characters, and the Hokkien group of Min Nan Chinese varieties, which is widely spoken in Southeast Asia. He was ordained there by William Charles Milne on 27 April 1819.

Medhurst served as a missionary in Penang in 1820, and then in Batavia (present-day Jakarta), capital of the Dutch East Indies in 1822. His son Walter Henry was born that year and born in 1828 was his daughter Eliza Mary who went on to marry Hong Kong's chief magistrate Charles Batten Hillier in 1846. Their youngest daughter was Augusta, born in 1840.

Today's All Saints Church, Jakarta and the Parapattan Orphanage were started by Medhurst.

In addition to compiling his Chinese-English and English-Chinese dictionaries, Medhurst was a prolific translator, lexicographer, and editor.

Although Medhurst never traveled to Japan, in 1830 he published An English and Japanese, and Japanese and English Vocabulary Compiled from Native Works in 344 pages. Based upon his studies of Hokkien, in 1831 Medhurst completed his A Dictionary of the Hok-këèn Dialect of the Chinese Language, but printing of all 862 pages of which reached finality only in 1837 after being affected by the end of the British East India Company's trade monopoly in 1834 and for lack of funds.

In the 1840s, Medhurst collaborated with John Stronach, Elijah Coleman Bridgman, and William Charles Milne translating the (1847) "Delegates' Version" of the Bible in Chinese. Medhurst, Elihu Doty, and John Van Nest Talmage developed the Pe̍h-ōe-jī Church Romanization of Southern Min Chinese that was widely used by missionaries.

When peace was concluded with China in 1842, he moved to Shanghai where he founded the London Missionary Society Press (Chinese: 墨海書館) together with William Muirhead and Dr William Lockhart. They were later joined by Joseph Edkins, and William Charles Milne. He continued in Shanghai until 1856, laying the foundations of a successful mission.

In 1843, New York University conferred upon him the honorary degree of D.D.

== Delegates' Version ==
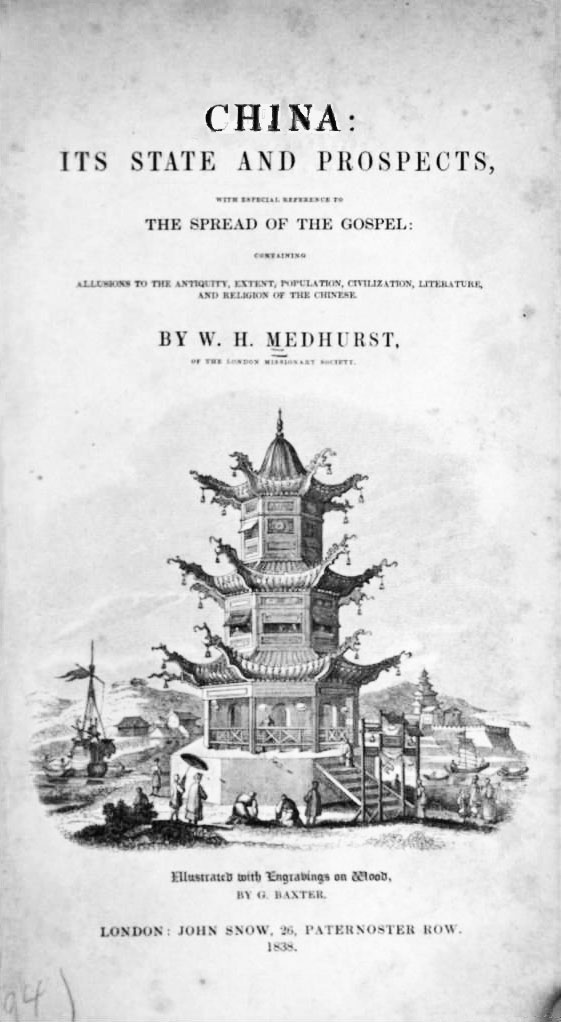
Medhurst's book on China inspired many to become missionaries including Hudson Taylor.

Medhurst's principal labour for several years, was in leading the committee of delegates, which created the Delegates' Version of the Bible. In the 1840s, a group of four people (Walter Henry Medhurst, John Stronach, Elijah Coleman Bridgman, and William Charles Milne) cooperated to translate the Bible into Chinese.

The translation of the Hebrew language part was done mostly by Karl Gützlaff from the Netherlands Missionary Society, with the exception of the Pentateuch and the book of Joshua, which were done by the group collectively. The initial Gutzlaff translation, completed in 1847 is well known due to its adoption by the revolutionary peasant leader Hong Xiuquan of the Taiping Rebellion as a doctrine of the organization.

The translation of the New Testament was finished in 1850 and of the Old Testament in 1853, written in a version of Classical Chinese. With John Stronach, and the assistance of Wang Tao, Medhurst later translated the New Testament into the Mandarin dialect of Nanjing.

== Significant books ==
Medhurst would also produce a Chinese translation of the Book of Common Prayer, published in Hong Kong in 1855.

His Chinese-English and English-Chinese dictionaries (each in 2 vols.) were in use into the twentieth century.

== Death & memorial ==
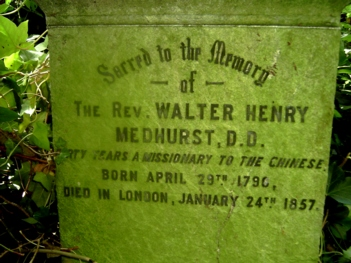
Inscription to Dr Medhurst at Abney Park

Medhurst left Shanghai in 1856, in failing health. He died two days after reaching London, on 24 January 1857 and was buried at the Congregationalists' non-denominational Abney Park Cemetery where his white stone obelisk monument can still be seen today. He left a son, Sir Walter Henry Medhurst (1822–1885), who was British consul at Hankou and afterwards at Shanghai.

== Works ==
- Medhurst, W. H. (1832). A Dictionary of the Hok-këèn Dialect of the Chinese Language: According to the Reading and Colloquial Idioms: Containing about 12,000 Characters. Macau: East India Press. OCLC 5314739. OL 14003967M.
- Medhurst, W. H. (1838). China: its state and prospects, with special reference to the spread of the gospel; containing allusions to the antiquity, extent, population, civilization, literature, and religion of the Chinese. Boston: Crocker & Brewster. OCLC 5314739. OL 13520937M.
- Medhurst, W. H. (1848). English and Chinese Dictionary. Shanghae (Shanghai): Mission Press. OCLC 6590623. OL 20458179M.
- Medhurst, W. H. (1842). Chinese and English Dictionary, containing all the words in the Chinese Imperial Dictionary, arranged according to the radicals, Volume 1. Parapattan, Batavia (Jakarta): no publisher stated on front page.
- Medhurst, W. H. (1843). Chinese and English Dictionary, containing all the words in the Chinese Imperial Dictionary, arranged according to the radicals, Volume 2. Parapattan, Batavia (Jakarta): no publisher stated on front page.
- Medhurst, W. H. (1847). A dissertation on the theology of the Chinese, with a view to the elucidation of the most appropriate term for expressing the deity, in the Chinese language. Shanghai: Mission Press.
- Medhurst, W. H. (1848). An inquiry into the proper mode of rendering the word God in translating the sacred scriptures into the Chinese language. Shanghai: Mission Press.
- Medhurst, W. H. (1848). Reply to the essay of Dr. Boone on the proper rendering of the words Elohim and Theos into the Chinese language. Shanghai: Mission Press.
- Medhurst, W. H. (1848). Reply to the few plain questions of a brother missionary. Shanghai: Mission Press.
- Medhurst, W. H. (1849). On the true meaning of the word Shin, as exhibited in the quotations adduced under that word in the Chinese Imperial thesaurus called the Pei-wan-yun-foo. Shanghai: Mission Press.
- Medhurst, W. H. (1850). An inquiry into the proper mode of translating Ruach and Pneuma in the Chinese version of the Scriptures. Shanghai: Mission Press.
- Medhurst, W. H. (1852). Reply to Dr. Boone's vindication of comments on the translation of Ephes. I. Shanghai: Mission Press.
