= Cai Gao =

Chinese singer (1788–1818)

Tsae Ko
- Traditional Chinese: 蔡高
- Simplified Chinese: 蔡高
Transcriptions
Standard Mandarin
- Hanyu Pinyin: Cài Gāo
- Wade–Giles: Ts‘ai Kao
Yue: Cantonese
- Jyutping: Coi³ Gou¹

Tsae A-Ko
- Traditional Chinese: 蔡亞高
- Simplified Chinese: 蔡亚高
Transcriptions
Standard Mandarin
- Hanyu Pinyin: Cài Yàgāo
- Wade–Giles: Ts‘ai Ya-kao
Yue: Cantonese
- Jyutping: Coi³ Aa³-gou¹; Coi³ Ngaa³-gou¹

Cai Ke

Tsae Ko
- Traditional Chinese: 蔡軻
- Simplified Chinese: 蔡轲
Transcriptions
Standard Mandarin
- Hanyu Pinyin: Cài Kē
- Wade–Giles: Ts‘ai K‘o
Yue: Cantonese
- Jyutping: Coi³ O¹

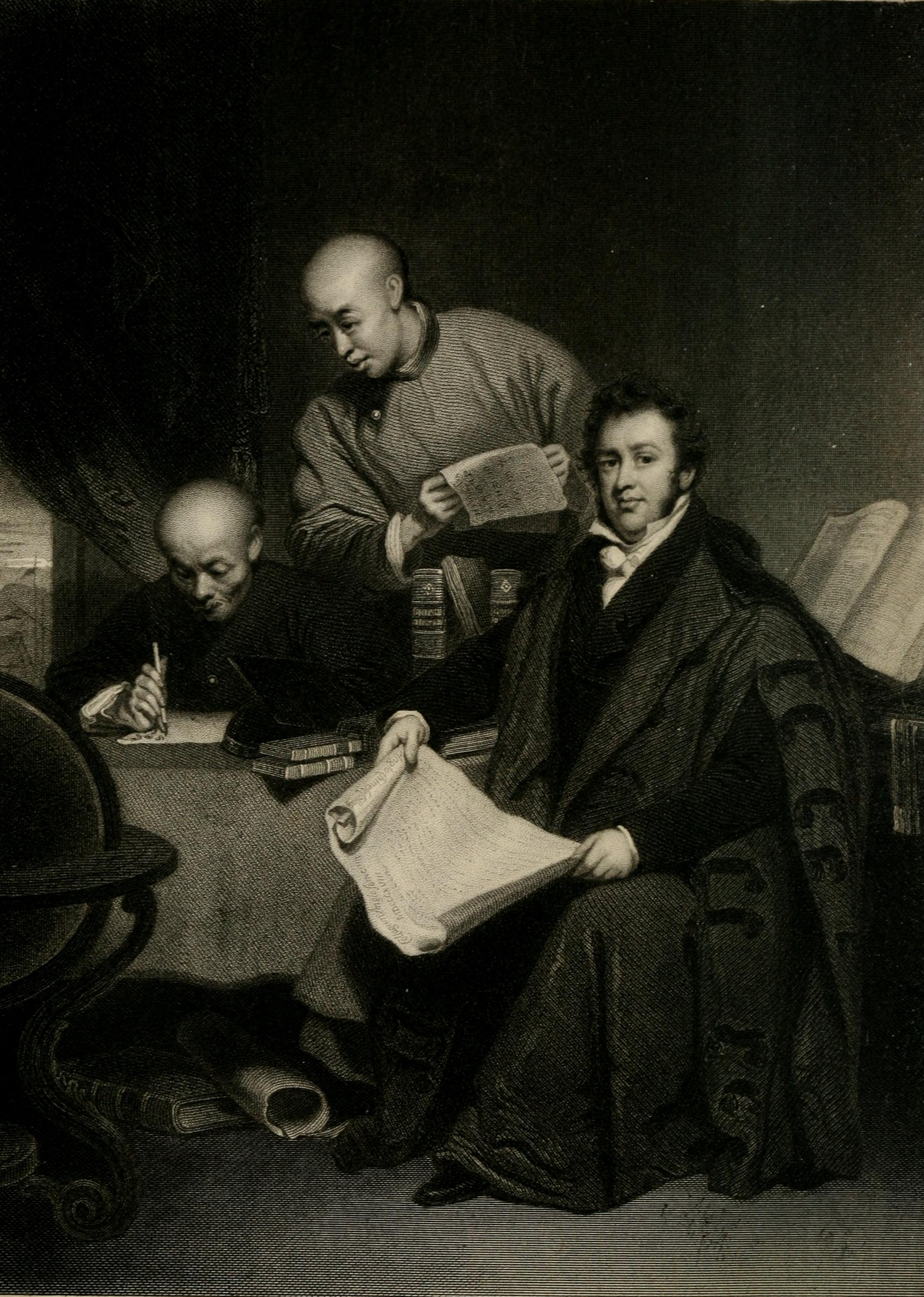
An engraving of George Chinnery's lost Robert Morrison Translating the Bible (c. 1828). Morrison is assisted by Li Shigong (left) and Chen Laoyi (right).

Cai Gao (1788–1818), also known as Tsae A-ko and by various other names, was the first Protestant convert in mainland China. (Note: Cai Gao is often simply called the first Protestant Chinese convert, but it is known that an overseas Chinese was baptized by the Baptist W. Robinson at Batavia in 1813.) He has also been called the first Western-style type-cutter and letterpress printer.

== Name ==
The real name of China's first Protestant convert is uncertain, although his surname was "almost certainly" 蔡. Like those of his family members, his name was recorded only in the missionaries' English romanizations, which include "Tsae-a-ko", "A-fo", and "A-no". Over the next two centuries, this was variously modernized as "Tsae A-ko", "A-Ko", "Ako", and "Ko". It has become generally accepted that these rendered the given names 蔡高 and 蔡亞高, which would be Cai Gao or Yagao in pinyin. Su and Ying, however, believe the original name to have been 蔡軻, which would be Cai Ke in pinyin. Smith also gives the Cantonese form as Choi A-ko.

== Family ==
Cai Gao's father was a Cantonese merchant at Macao whose legal wife had borne him no children; Gao's mother was his second concubine. He had an elder brother (born c. 1782) whose name variously appears as "Low Hëen", "Low-hëen", "A-hëen", and "A-këen". (Note: The original name of "Tsae Low-heen" is reconstructed by Kim as Cai Luxing (蔡盧興), by Gu and Zetzsche as Cai Xing (蔡興), and by Su as Cai Xuan (蔡軒). Strandenaes lists the possibilities "Lo-Xien, Lou Qian, or even 'the Elder/Senior Xien'", but the "low" in his name is explicitly glossed by Morrison's widow as intending the Cantonese pronunciation of "old" (老).) He had another brother "A-yun" or "Ayun", (Note: The original name of "Tsae A-yun" is reconstructed by Su as Cai Yun (蔡運).) who was "a child", younger than Low-hëen and whom Morrison "wish[ed] to educate". Though frequently taken as Gao's younger brother, A-yun appears as his "elder brother" in the Mission Society's 1819 report. Morrison's journals mention an "A-Sam" who was distinct from A-yun and, as "a lad", distinct from his older tutor and companion Yong Sam-tak. (Note: Yong Sam-tak appears in Morrison's journal variously as "Yong-Sam-Tak", "Yong-Sam", "Sam-Tak", "Low-Sam", and "Sam".) McNeur, Gu, and Zetzsche do not mention A-yun as one of Gao's brothers but do say that "A-sam" was his younger brother. (Note: The original name of "Tsae Sam" is reconstructed by Gu and Zetzsche as Cai San (蔡三).)

The use of lou⁵ (老, p lǎo, "old") and aa³ (then 亞, p yà or yǎ, but now 阿, ā, "dear ~, dear little ~") reflects the standard practice of Cantonese nicknames. Morrison notes that these were generally used without "Tsae, being the sacred or family name". As the elder member of the family, "Low-hëen" received the affectionate honorific "low-" and the others the diminutive "a-". While it is possible "Low-hëen" and "A-hëen" were different members of the family, they are not distinguished as such by Morrison.

== Life ==
Cai Gao was born in 1788. He and his brothers were given a good Chinese education, although Gao's poor health caused him to fall behind his brother Low-hëen. His calligraphy, however, was quite good. During his adolescence, his father's wealth was lost when his ship returning from Batavia (now Jakarta) in the Dutch East Indies (now Indonesia) was wrecked in the South China Sea. The father died when Gao was sixteen. (Note: The Biographical Dictionary of Chinese Christianity conflates the two events, having the merchant Cai sink with his ship.) Upon the ruin of their family, their father's debts were so large that Gao's brother Low-hëen was suddenly arrested and imprisoned over a decade later for the unpaid amount. (Note: Robert Morrison posted his bail with the county magistrate.)

In March 1808, Gao—then 20—began working for Robert Morrison at his home in Guangzhou's Thirteen Factories trading ghetto. Morrison was the first Protestant missionary to the Qing Empire and a translator for the East India Company. With the assistance of his Chinese staff, he published the first Chinese-language periodical and, with additional assistance from William Milne, wrote the first major Chinese–English, English–Chinese dictionary from 1815 to 1823. Low-hëen was already Morrison's tutor and companion, teaching him Cantonese and copying out Morrison's Chinese translation of the Bible. Gao was recommended by Yong Sam-tak, who had served as Morrison's comprador since February 1801, to be Morrison's printer, carving the wooden blocks necessary to publish the Chinese characters of his text. He also took charge of Morrison's shopping and provisioning. Morrison took note of him, saying "There is one boy, a fatherless lad, the brother of Low-heen. He possesses tolerable parts. I wish to pay attention to him."

Morrison asked his employees to attend Sunday worship services at his home. There were also daily meetings which began with Morrison praying, followed by a reading from his Chinese translation of the Bible and Morrison's commentary on it. They ended with hymns. These meetings were sometimes followed by personal counseling. At first Cai Gao was unable to understand Morrison's attempts to discuss Christianity, but he assisted Low-hëen in printing Morrison's Chinese translation of the New Testament. After about five months, he began praying with Morrison in Chinese. Nonetheless, owing to his quarreling with Morrison's Mandarin tutor "Kwei-Une", (Note: The original name of "Kwei-Une" is reconstructed by the Biographical Dictionary of Chinese Christianity as Gui Youni. His instruction was on the Nanjing rather than the Beijing dialect, a training reflected in Morrison's Chinese dictionary.) the missionary fired them both in late September 1808. Morrison never brought him back into personal service, even after his conversion, but hired him two years later as the printer for his missionary periodical. In his survey of the development of Western-style printing in China, Reed calls Cai Gao "the first Chinese type-cutter and letterpress operator".

Low-hëen continued to work with Morrison and Cai Gao continued to join him for Morrison's meetings and Sunday services. (Low-hëen was an ardent Confucianist, uninterested in Morrison's faith, but attended out of his sense of obligation to his employer.) By October 1812, Gao was reading Morrison's Bible before the group, expressing his own ideas about religion, and requesting Morrison's guidance on proper prayer. On October 30, he brought Morrison some idols, saying that he agreed with their uselessness. On November 8, he admitted that he desired baptism, but so secretly that his brothers wouldn't know. His bad temper and quarrelsome nature caused Morrison to deny his request. After a period of improved behavior and various testing, Cai Gao wrote out a statement of faith and Morrison relented. The confession follows the structure of a catechism, noting his own sins and "complete depravity", the need for salvation, Christ's ability to provide it and good works' inability, and his hope of resurrection. (Note: Tsae's conversion account circulated broadly. For a list of its appearances, see Fischer.)

He was baptized by Robert Morrison on Macao on July 16, 1814, becoming the first Protestant convert in mainland China. Morrison's journal entry read,

"At a spring of water issuing from the foot of a lofty hill by the seaside away from human observation, I baptized, in the Name of the Father, Son, and Holy Spirit, the person whose name and character have been given above. Oh, that the Lord may cleanse him from all sin by the blood of Jesus; and purify his heart by the influences of the Holy Spirit! May he be the first-fruits of a great harvest, one of millions who shall come and be saved."

Cai Gao continued to attend services faithfully, with Morrison noting that he attended every Sunday "so long as [he] is within a few miles". All the same, Morrison continued to complain that "he is not so docile as I could wish".

In January 1817, officers from Guangdong raided the East India Company's printing offices on Macao, prompting all Morrison's Chinese associates to flee. Gao and two others snuck onto a ship bound for British Malacca. Morrison paid the stow-aways' fare, giving $6 and two boxes of tea to their families in China. He further gave Gao an interest-free $200 loan to start a business to provide for his livelihood while abroad. After he arrived, he began writing books for the London Missionary Society's station. He was probably also responsible for the hand-cut Chinese type used by the station's printing press. With the station's printer Liang Fa, who had become the second baptized mainland Chinese in 1816, he attended William Milne's open Sunday services and private lessons each Tuesday evening at 8. Milne found both "sincere, tho very imperfect, Christians". (Note: Milne, cited in Song.)

Cai Gao returned to China after six months abroad. On 10 October 1818, Morrison wrote to the London Missionary Society to say that his convert was "suffering from a serious lung disease and I fear this illness is on the verge of ending his life". He died before the end of the month (Note: In addition to the correct date, McNeur at one point also mistakenly gives the year 1819. This date is also given by an article in the 1887 Chinese Recorder.) of pulmonary consumption. His brother Low-hëen did not return to Morrison's employment after the raid but he unexpectedly wrote to Morrison in Macao in 1822 requesting baptism. No extant record records it, but they remained close and Low-hëen continued to attend Morrison's gatherings and services until 1827. Another of Gao's brothers, A-yun, began working for the LMS missionary John Slater while in Malacca in 1818 but returned to China by November 1819, when officers hunted him and Morrison's other Chinese associates for their involvement with Liang Fa's attempted publication of a Christian tract for distribution in his native village. Morrison hid him in his locked bedroom until he could escape under cover of darkness. He then accompanied Morrison to Malacca in early 1823 to deal with the problems caused by Milne's death, after which his fate is unrecorded.

== Legacy ==
A Protestant chapel in Macau bore his name.

== See also ==
- Liang Fa, the 2nd Protestant convert
- Wat Ngong (Qu Ya'ang), another convert
