= List of works by Robert Morrison (missionary) =

This is list of scholarly, missionary and other works by Robert Morrison (missionary):

- Robert Morrison (1812). Horae Sinicae: Translations from the Popular Literature of the Chinese. London.
- Robert Morrison (1813). Hsin i Chao Shu.
- Robert Morrison (1815). Translations from the Original Chinese, with Notes. Canton.
- Robert Morrison (1815). A Grammar of the Chinese Language. Serampore: Printed at the Mission-Press. pp. 280.
- Robert Morrison (1815). A grammar of the Chinese language . Serampore: Printed at the Mission-press. p. 280.
- Authors Antonio Montucci; Horae Sinicae; Robert Morrison (1817). Urh-chĭh-tsze-tëen-se-yĭn-pe-keáou; being a parallel drawn between the two intended Chinese dictionaries, by R. Morrison and A. Montucci. Together with Morrison's Horæ Sinicæ [&c.]. MACAO: LONDON: PRINTED FOR THE AUTHOR, AND SOLD BY T. CADELL AND W. DAVIES. IN THE STRAND: AND T. BOOSEY, OLD BROAD-STREET. p. 141.
- Robert Morrison (1817). A view of China for philological purposes, containing a sketch of Chinese chronology, geography, government, religion & customs. MACAO: Printed at the Honorable the East India Company's Press by P.P. Thoms; published and sold by Black, Parbury, and Allen, Booksellers to the Honorable East India Company, London.
- Robert Morrison (1817). A view of China for philological purposes: containing a sketch of Chinese chronology, geography, government, religion & customs, designed for the use of persons who study the Chinese language. MACAO: Printed at the Honorable the East India Company's Press by P.P. Thoms; published and sold by Black, Parbury, and Allen. p. 141.
- Robert Morrison (1819). A Dictionary of the Chinese Language: Chinese and English arranged according to the radicals. Vol. 1, Part 2 of A Dictionary of the Chinese Language: In Three Parts. MACAO, CHINA: Printed at the Honorable the East India Company's Press by P.P. Thoms.
- Robert Morrison (1820). A Dictionary of the Chinese Language: In Three Parts, Volume 2. MACAO: Printed at the Honorable the East India Company's Press by P.P. Thoms; published and sold by Black, Parbury, and Allen, Booksellers to the Honorable East India Company, London.
- Robert Morrison (1822). A Dictionary of the Chinese Language: Chinese and English arranged according to the radicals. Vol. 2, Part 1 of A Dictionary of the Chinese Language: In Three Parts. MACAO: Printed at the Honorable the East India Company's Press by P.P. Thoms; published and sold by Kingsbury, Parbury, and Allen, Leadenhall Street.
- Robert Morrison (1822). A dictionary of the Chinese language: in three parts, part the first containing Chinese and English, arranged according to the radicals, part the second, Chinese and English arranged alphabetically and part the third English and Chinese, Volume 1, Issue 2. MACAO: Printed at the Honorable the East India Company's Press by P.P. Thoms; published and sold by Kingsbury, Parbury, and Allen, Leadenhall Street.
- Robert Morrison (1822). A Dictionary of the Chinese Language: Chinese and English arranged according to the radicals. MACAO, CHINA: Printed at the Honorable East India company's press, by P.P. Thoms. p. 214.
- Robert Morrison (1822). A dictionary of the Chinese language: in three parts, Volume 6. MACAO, CHINA: Printed at the Honorable East India company's press, by P.P. Thoms.
- Robert Morrison (1823). A dictionary of the Chinese language: in three parts, part the first containing Chinese and English, arranged according to the radicals, part the second, Chinese and English arranged alphabetically and part the third English and Chinese, Volume 1, Issue 3. MACAO: Printed at the Honorable the East India Company's Press by P.P. Thoms; published and sold by Kingsbury, Parbury, and Allen, Leadenhall Street. p. 910.
- Robert Morrison (1823). A Dictionary of the Chinese Language, in Three Parts: English and Chinese. Vol. 3 of A Dictionary of the Chinese Language, in Three Parts (reprint ed.). MACAO: Printed at the Honorable the East India Company's Press by P.P. Thoms; published and sold by Kingsbury, Parbury, and Allen, Leadenhall Street.
- Robert Morrison (1819). reprint (ed.). A Dictionary of the Chinese Language, in Three Parts: Chinese and English arranged according to the radicals. Vol. 4 of A Dictionary of the Chinese Language, in Three Parts, Robert Morrison (reprint ed.). MACAO: Printed at the Honorable the East India Company's Press by P.P. Thoms.
- Robert Morrison (1825). Chinese miscellany; consisting of original extracts from Chinese authors, in the native character. London: PRINTED BY S. MCDOWALL, LEADENHALL STREET, FOR THE LONDON MISSIONARY SOCIETY: “The” Missionary soc.
- Robert Morrison (1828). Vocabulary of the Canton Dialect: Chinese words and phrases. Vol. 3 of Vocabulary of the Canton Dialect. MACAO, CHINA: Printed at the Honorable East India company's press, by G.J. Steyn, and brother. Archived from the original on Feb 6, 2013.
- Eliza A. Mrs. Robert Morrison (1839). Memoirs of the life and labours Robert Morrison. P. P. THOMS, PRINTER, Warwick Square: LONDON: Longman, Orme, Brown, and Longmans.
- Robert Morrison (1865). A dictionary of the Chinese language, Volume 2 (reprint ed.). SHANGHAE: Shanghae: London Mission Press., London: Trübner & CO.
- Robert Morrison. A View of China, for Philological Purposes Containing a Sketch of Chinese Chronology, Geography, Government, Religion and Customs. Elibron.com. ISBN 1402178786.

== Resources ==
- Works by Morrison, Robert, 1782-1834 - scans on Internet Archive
- Andrew West, The Morrison Collection: Bibliography of Robert Morrison
