= A Dictionary of the Chinese Language =

A Dictionary of the Chinese Language in Three Parts
- A Dictionary of the Chinese Language, Part I, Vol. I, title page
- Author: Robert Morrison
- Language: Chinese, English
- Publisher: Peter Perring Thoms
- Publication date: 1815-1823
- Publication place: Macau, Qing Dynasty
- Media type: Print
- Pages: 4,595
- OCLC: 500112156
- Website: https://archive.org/details/p2dictionaryofch01morruoft

A Dictionary of the Chinese Language, in Three Parts, or Morrison's Chinese dictionary (1815–1823), compiled by the Anglo-Scottish missionary Robert Morrison was the first Chinese-English, English-Chinese dictionary. Part I is Chinese-English arranged by the 214 Kangxi radicals, Part II is Chinese-English arranged alphabetically, and Part III is English-Chinese also arranged alphabetically. This groundbreaking reference work is enormous, comprising 4,595 pages in 6 quarto volumes and including 47,035 head characters taken from the 1716 Kangxi Dictionary. However, Morrison's encyclopedic dictionary had flaws, notably failing to distinguish aspirated consonants: the pronunciation taou is given for both aspirated táo (桃, "peach") and unaspirated dào (道, "way; the Tao").

== History ==
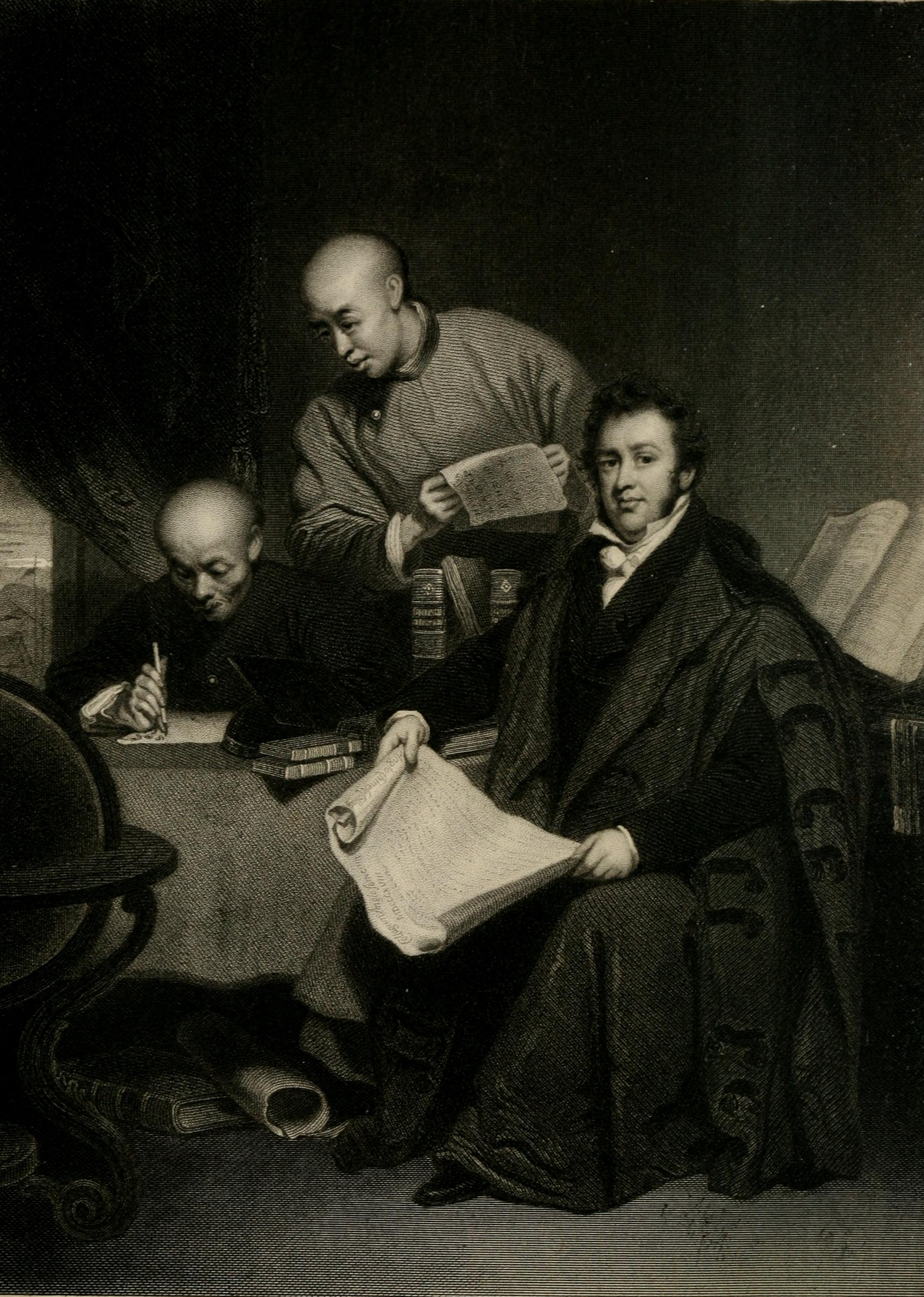
An engraving of George Chinnery's lost Robert Morrison Translating the Bible (c. 1828). Morrison is assisted by Li Shigong (left) and Chen Laoyi (right).

Robert Morrison (1782-1834) is credited with several historical firsts in addition to the first bidirectional Chinese and English dictionary. He was the first Protestant missionary in China, started the first Chinese-language periodical in 1815, collaborated with William Milne to write the first translation of the Bible into Chinese in 1823, helped to found the English-language The Canton Register in 1827, and compiled the first Western-language dictionary of a regional variety of Chinese.

Morrison joined the London Missionary Society in 1804 and was chosen to lead a mission to China. They sent him to study at Gosport and introduced him to a young Cantonese man studying English in London: Robert Morrison transcribes his name as "Yong Sam Tak", Eliza Morrison as "Yung-san-tih" in "Mandarin" transcription, and whose actual name was probably Rong Sande (容三德). In 1807, the LMS instructed Morrison to sail to Guangzhou (then known as "Canton") and continue studying until he had "accomplished [his] great object of acquiring the language", whereupon he would "turn this attainment into a direction which may be of extensive use to the world: perhaps you may have the honour of forming a Chinese Dictionary, more comprehensive and correct than any preceding one", as well as translating the Bible into Chinese.

Upon his arrival in the Qing Empire, Morrison learned that the Chinese were prohibited from teaching their language to foreigners, forcing him to study Chinese secretly and hide his books from sight. Morrison eventually found two tutors, the scholar "Ko Seen-sang" and Abel Yun, who had learned Latin from Catholic missionaries. Together, they began to translate the scriptures and compile the dictionary. In 1809, the East India Company employed Morrison as their translator, which legitimized his presence in Guangzhou's Thirteen Factories and provided sufficient income to continue working on the dictionary project and Bible translation. He translated and printed the Acts of the Apostles in 1810 and completed his Chinese Grammar in 1811. The situation worsened in 1812 when the Jiaqing Emperor issued an edict adding Christianity to the list of banned witchcrafts and superstitions, making the printing of Chinese-language books on the subject a capital crime. The LMS sent the missionary William Milne to assist Morrison in translating and printing the scriptures. In 1814, the East India Company sent the printing engineer Peter Perring Thoms. Together with Morrison's Chinese assistants such as Cai Gao and Liang Fa, he created the Chinese character font for the dictionary. Morrison worked on producing A Dictionary of the Chinese Language for more than 15 years with "extraordinary perseverance, industry, and ingenuity".

Morrison described the bilingual Chinese dictionaries that he used as sources for his own lexicographical work: "several MS. Dictionaries of the old Missionaries, in English and French, and, latterly, the printed copy of Father Basil's Dictionary". This refers to the 9,000-entry 1698 Dictionarium Sino-Latinum manuscript of the Italian Franciscan Basilio Brollo or de Glemona (1648-1704), which the French orientalist Joseph de Guignes (1759-1845) translated as the 1813 Dictionnaire Chinois, Français et Latin without any attribution to the original author. Brollo's innovation was to provide a Chinese character dictionary alphabetically collated by transliteration, with a user-friendly index arranged by radicals and strokes, successfully combining Chinese and European lexicographic traditions. This lexicographical macrostructure was adopted in Morrison's dictionary, and most bilingual Chinese dictionaries up to the present day.

The first volume of Morrison's Chinese dictionary was published in 1815 and the last in 1823. All 6 volumes were printed by P. P. Thoms in Macao and published and sold by Black, Parbury, & Allen, the booksellers to the East India Company. The dictionary was printed in a run of 750 copies at a total cost of £10,440; or £12,000 they sold for the "princely sum" of 20 guineas. The LMS was unable to subsidize the entire project, but the directors of the East India Company agreed to pay because they recognized the dictionary's incalculable benefit, not only to missionaries but also to their own employees. The later volumes were published simultaneously in London by Kingsbury, Parbury, & Allen or by Black, Parbury, & Allen.

The Dictionary of the Chinese Language marked a new era in the compilation and publication of bilingual Chinese works. Before the 19th century, Catholic missionaries such as Basilio Brollo had compiled many bilingual manuscript dictionaries, but their circulation was inevitably restricted by the difficulties of copying a dictionary by hand. The initial edition of 750 copies and subsequent reprints enabled Morrison's dictionary to reach a wider readership and have a far more profound impact.

Publication history
Part	Volume	Year of Publication	Pages	(+ Preface)
I	I	1815	930	+ 20
I	II	1822	884	
I	III	1823	908	
II	I	1819	1,090	+ 20
II	II	1820	483	+ 6
III		1822	480	+ 5

Morrison's dictionary is composed of three parts or six quarto (306 mm × 242 mm or 12.0 in × 9.5 in) volumes published in different years. Part I has 3 volumes with Volume I published in 1815 containing 18 pages in the preface, 930 pages in the dictionary proper, and 2 additional pages consisting of advertisements. Volume II, published in 1822, is composed of 884 pages, and Volume III, published in 1823, is composed of 908 pages. Part II has two volumes: Volume I published in 1819 contains 20 pages in the preface and 1,090 pages in the dictionary proper, and Volume II published in 1820 contains 6 pages in the preface, 178 pages in the first section, and 305 pages in the second section of the dictionary proper. Part III was published in 1822 with only one volume containing 5 pages in the preface and 480 pages in the dictionary proper.

The publication of Morrison's dictionary attracted the attention of scholars worldwide, and Part II was reprinted from 1865 until 1913. The revised preface says the second part "has been generally commended by experienced Sinologues as the most perfect and useful of the whole". In 1865, the London Mission Press in Shanghai and Trubner & Co. in London first republished Part II in 2 volumes, totaling 1630 pages. In 1913, Zhonghua Book Company reprinted Part II in a pocketbook size, which made it much more affordable and easier to carry.

Morrison's lexicographical legacy is reflected in two facts: his dictionary's macrostructure and microstructure became the model for many later Chinese-English dictionaries, and his transliteration system was adopted as the basis for Wade-Giles romanization.

Morrison's Chinese dictionary became the prototype for other 19th-century works. The English Congregationalist missionary and Bible translator Walter Henry Medhurst compiled the 1842 and 1847 Chinese and English Dictionary: Containing all the Words in the Chinese Imperial Dictionary, Arranged According to the Radicals. Medhurst claimed this was an original translation based on the Kangxi Zidian, but it was in fact just an edited abridgment of Morrison's dictionary, a "plagiarism rather than an original compilation". The American sinologist and missionary Samuel Wells Williams compiled the 1874 Syllabic Dictionary of the Chinese Language, whose Chinese title (漢英韻府) echoed that of Part II of Morrison's work (五車韻府). The preface says that although many similar Chinese-English dictionaries by Medhurst, Elijah Coleman Bridgman, and others were published in small numbers, they became "very scarce, while the number of students has increased tenfold", and learners of Chinese relied on reprints of Morrison. Williams explicitly identified "Dr. Medhurst's translation of the K'anghi Tsz'tien" as a more important source for his own work than Morrison's dictionary. The British diplomat and sinologist Herbert Giles edited A Chinese-English Dictionary, published in 1892 and 1912. Giles praised Morrison as "the great pioneer" of Chinese-English lexicography, but criticized his failure to mark aspiration. He said Medhurst "attempted aspirates" but omitted some and wrongly inserted others. While Williams correctly marked aspiration and tones, Giles says "he provided too few phrases, and mistranslated a large number of those". Ironically, Yang's textual analysis finds that Giles's dictionary is more closely linked to Williams's than to Morrison's.

Morrison's Chinese dictionary introduced a systematic transliteration system that was used for over four decades until it was replaced by Thomas Francis Wade's romanization scheme in 1867; that became the basis for the Wade-Giles system of 1892-1912, which was widely used and still survives alongside pinyin romanization. Morrison's system was almost forgotten after being replaced by Wade romanization, but James Legge adopted it virtually unchanged into the Legge romanization used in his Chinese Classics (1861–1872). Morrison's romanization system influenced the Wade, Legge, and Wade-Giles schemes.

Robert Morrison's dictionary is still in use two hundred years after its publication. For example, the American sinologist W. South Coblin analyzed Morrison's romanization of Mandarin for clues about the pronunciation of early 19th-century standard Chinese. Morrison's pronunciation glosses followed the lower Yangtze koiné as the standard Mandarin of the time, "what the Chinese call the Nanking Dialect, than the Peking".

== Content ==
The title pages of the dictionary's parts give two versions of the full title. Part I's title page (shown above) reads "Part the First; Containing Chinese and English, Arranged According to the Radicals; Part the Second; Chinese and English, Arranged Alphabetically; and Part the Third, English and Chinese". The title pages of Part II and Part iii read "Part the First, Containing Chinese and English Arranged According to the Keys; Part the Second, Chinese and English Arranged Alphabetically, and Part the Third, Consisting of English and Chinese". Each part of the dictionary is a complete and independent unit in itself.

=== Part I: A Dictionary of the Chinese Language ===
The entry on 道 ("Taou", now dào) in Part I of Morrison's dictionary. The original did not include tone marks, but a reader has added it to this entry

Part I, A Dictionary of the Chinese Language, is supertitled in Chinese—but not English—as a "character dictionary" (字典). It was a Chinese-to-English dictionary, organized by the 214 radical system employed by the 1716 Kangxi Dictionary. These radicals are the initial or major graphic components of Chinese characters, ranging from 1 to 17 strokes. In Morrison's dictionary, Volume I starts with Radical 1 (一, "one") and ends at Radical 41 (寸 ("thumb; Chinese inch")); Volume II starts with Radical 42 (小, "small") and stops at Radical 119 (米, "rice"); and Volume III begins with Radical 120 (糸, "silk") and ends the dictionary with Radical 214 (龠, "flute"). Vols. II & III were published simultaneously in London by Kingsbury, Parbury, & Allen.

Morrison acknowledged his debt to the Kangxi Dictionary in his introduction to Volume I, saying it "forms the ground work" of Part I, including its arrangement, number of characters (47,035), and many of its definitions and examples. However, it also differed in significant ways. Chinese scholars have found that the majority of the Kangxi dictionary's usage examples were taken from books before the 10th century and ignored vulgar forms and expressions. Morrison also noticed this and chose examples better suited to his intended readership, adding vulgar, humorous, colloquial, and modern examples. For instance, Morrison included descriptions for 王八 (wángba, "tortoise" but also "cuckold; son of a bitch; pimp") and 烏龜 (wūguī, "tortoise" but also "cuckold") as "terms of abuse, denoting one who lives on his wife's prostitution; one lost to virtue". Similarly 王八蛋 (wángbadàn, "turtle egg" but also "son of a bitch") as "a bastard, in opprobrious language". Morrison's dictionary also gives Chinese usage examples and quotations from a wide range of sources, including classical literature, law, medicine, novels, and numerous unidentified contemporary sources.

His orthographic standard for the dictionary's "Radicals, and of the large Characters throughout the work," was said to have been "taken from an excellent Dictionary". This was either Sha Mu's 1787 Yiwen Beilan (藝文備覽, "Literary Writings for Consultation", or E-wǎn-pe-lan in Sha's romanization) or its 1807 reprint. Morrison's copy is now located at the University of London's SOAS Library. A comparative study of its annotations confirms its influence, although this remained less marked than that of the Kangxi Dictionary.

Philosophically, Morrison's dictionary departed from that ordered by the Kangxi Emperor by including not only the Confucian Four Books and Five Classics but many more items drawn from Taoist and Buddhist texts. Yang uses the example of the dictionary's first entry, 一 (yi, "one"), which notes

The Secl [Sect] Taou affirms, that 道生一一生二二生三三生萬物... "Taou produced one, one produced two, two produced three, and three produced all things." If it be asked, what then is Taou? They reply, 靜極乃道也... "Extreme quiescence, or a state of perfect stillness is Taou." The Three, when speaking of their external appearance, they call 天之秀氣地之生氣感和風之清氣... "The heaven's adorning principle, earth's life giving principle, and the pure principle of the exciting harmonizing wind"; or as they define it, "That aerial principle, or influence, by which the heavens and earth act on each other." The internal Three, they call 氣之清神之靈精之潔靜裏分陰陽而精氣神同化於虛無... "The clear unmixed influence, the intelligence of spirit; the purity of essence; in the midst of quiescence separated the Yin and Yang. Essence, influence and spirit, together operated in a state of vacuum." (Taou tĭh king). Their notions of the great One Cause of all things, are very fanciful and obscure.

The first quote is from Tao Te Ching (Ch. 42) and the others from commentaries.

The first volume of Part I and its two companion volumes were written in notably different styles. Volume I is "notoriously abundant" in encyclopedic examples and quotations, while the other two volumes of Part I just provide brief definitions and a few examples. When Morrison published the first volume of Part I in 1815 after 8 years of hard work, he realized that if he tried to compile the rest of the dictionary on such a comprehensive scale, he might not finish the dictionary in his lifetime. He then changed course and rapidly published Part II in 1819 and 1820. His dictionary's alphabetically arranged Part II, with concise definitions and brief usage examples, proved to be more useful for learners of Chinese but lacked the rich quotations that made the first volume of Part I a model of an "encyclopedic and culturally rich bilingual dictionary". To illustrate Volume I's "grand scope" and "many surprises", Wu Xian & al. cited the 40-page entry for 學 (xue, "study; receive instruction; practice; imitate; learn; a place of studying") whose usage examples and illustrations range across the traditional Chinese educational system from "private school" (學館, xueguan) to "government-run prefectural school" (府學, fuxue), explain the imperial examination civil service system from "county candidates" (秀才, xiucai) to "members of the imperial Hanlin Academy" (翰林, hanlin), and include a variety of related terms and passages such as 100 rules for schools, details on examination systems, and a list of books for classical study. They conclude that the dictionary's "richness of information was unprecedented".

An example of a later entry is 道 (dào, "way") in Volume III. It is given with his atonal romanization "TAOU" under Radical 162 (辵, "walk"), with the roman numeral IX noting that it has nine strokes beyond those of the base radical. The regular script character and pronunciation are given alongside its small seal and cursive forms, followed by English translations, derived terms, and usage examples. In this case, the word is glossed as "A way; a path; being at the head; the way that leads to; a thoroughfare on all sides. A principle. The principle from which heaven, earth, man, and all nature emanates." Of the 22 words and usages given, the first six are medical terms (e.g., "Seaou pëen taou 小便道 the urinary passage; the vagina") and the last thirteen are administrative circuits of imperial China (e.g., "河南道 Ho-nan taou") The other three are notice of the Daoguang Emperor's era name ("Taou-kwang yuen nëen 道光元年 the first of Taoukwang, 'reason's glory,' title of the reigning emperor of China (A.D. 1821)"); the common word dàoxǐ ("Taou he 道喜 to congratulate, an expression used amongst equals"); and a citation from Confucius's Analects ("Taou tsëen shing che kwǒ 道千乘之國 To rule or govern a nation that can send forth a thousand war chariots").

=== Part II: A Dictionary of the Chinese Language, Arranged Alphabetically ===
The entry on 道 ("Taou", now dào) in Part II of Morrison's dictionary.

A page of script variants for 道 ("Taou", now dào) from Part II of Morrison's dictionary.

Part II, A Dictionary of the Chinese Language, Arranged Alphabetically, is supertitled in Chinese—but not English—as a Wuche Yunfu (五車韻府, "Erudition Phonetic Dictionary"). The name literally means a "five-cart[loads of books, a classical idiom for "erudite"] storehouse of euphony", and copies the title of an earlier rime dictionary compiled by Chen Jinmo (陳藎謨) and Han Yihu (含一胡), who gave its unpublished manuscript to the editors of the Kangxi Dictionary. They made extensive use of it, with definitions often identical in both works. Morrison claimed to have worked from Chen and Han's dictionary, rearranging its roughly 40,000 characters according to syllables instead of pronunciations and tones with the help of the Fenyun (分韻, "Divisions of Rimes") and Basilio Brollo's dictionary, as well as contemporary words from elsewhere. This work took about seven years. Yang's comparative study of Parts I and II found, however, that the definitions of both are clearly based on the Kangxi Dictionary and reflect little content from original Wuche Yunfu.

Part II is in two volumes. In Volume I, the preface explains the dictionary's composition, purpose and orthography and the main section is a "Syllabic Dictionary" in which romanized Chinese words are collated in alphabetical order. In Volume II, the first section contains a table of the 214 Kangxi radicals, a radical-and-stroke index of the characters in Volume I, and an English-to-Chinese index of words that gives the character numbers in Volume I. The second independent section "A Synopsis of Various Forms of the Chinese Character" giving the regular script, semi-cursive script, cursive script, clerical script, small seal script, and bronze script forms of various characters. Part II of the dictionary contains 12,674 character entries, far fewer than the 47,035 entries in Part I. On the other hand, it continued to provide an estimated 20,000 examples and Chinese quotations in Chinese characters, accompanied with romanization and English translations, a vast improvement over earlier dictionaries without examples or Basilio Brollo's Chinese–Latin dictionaries, which presented its examples only in romanization. Vol. I was only published in Macao, but Vol. II was published simultaneously at London by Black, Parbury, & Allen.

The preface notes Morrison's intent: "The Author's object has been, and the intention of the Dictionary ought to be, to communicate the Language to Europeans". Its content is wide-ranging. "There are beautiful pieces of poetry, interesting and instructive portions of History and Biography; and important Moral Maxims, in Chinese that is a language amongst the most ancient and the most extensively known on earth,... it is the living language of five nations, which together, constitute one third of the mankind." 1815 say, "Far more than a mere dictionary of the Chinese language, Morrison's dictionary is a history book, a biography, a collection of idiomatic expressions and common sayings of the Chinese people, and, last but not least, full of the Christian evangelical message expressed in many ways". In both Part I and II, discussion of paper (紙) occasions discussion of its invention by Cai Lun, although his name appears as both "Tsae Lun" or "Tsae-lun" and one entry mistakenly places him in the 10th century instead of the 1st. Another example is the entry on 猜 (cāi, "guess; suspect"), which occasions a digression on a Chinese drinking game: "猜拳 to guess the number of fingers thrown out, or stretched straight from a previously folded hand, which is a drunken amusement of the Chinese. When the opponent guesses the right number of fingers thrown out, at the instant he speaks, he wins, and the person throwing out his fingers has to drink as a forfeit.".

Part II—unlike Part I—includes notation regarding Chinese tones. Unfortunately, Morrison transcribed the four tone distinctions of Middle Chinese rhyme dictionaries rather than those of modern Chinese. The romanizations of Part II are left unmarked for a "level" tone (平, píng), given a grave accent (e.g., à) for a "rising" tone (上, shǎng), given an acute accent (e.g., á) for a "departing" tone (去, qù), and a breve (e.g., ǎ) for an "entering" tone. By the time Morrison was composing his dictionary, the old level tone had begun dividing into modern Mandarin's high and rising tones; the old rising tone had begun dividing into the modern third and falling tones; and the entering tone had ceased to exist. Only the old departing tone continued to exist, as the modern falling tone. (In other dialects of Chinese, such as Cantonese, these tones developed separately but Morrison employed the Nanjing dialect of his era's Mandarin).

Part II also includes etymological glosses of the formation of the Chinese characters. Although these were often (inaccurate) guesses or folk etymologies, they helped students of Chinese as a second language to comprehend and memorize characters. Wu Xian & al. draw attention to his treatment of the character 仰 (yǎng, "look up; admire"), which now consists of Radical 9 (人, "person") and 卬 (áng, "high"). Morrison wrote, "YANG 仰, from man and to look upwards. To raise the head and look upwards with expectation or desire...". Two subsequent centuries of study and archeological discoveries have greatly increased understanding of how Chinese characters originated. It is now established that "Originally 卬 depicted a person standing next to 卩 (jié) a person kneeling. Another 亻 (人 rén) person was added later, forming 仰".

The entry for 道 in the second part of Morrison's dictionary gives a graphic variant 衟, the entry number 9945, the acute accent "departing" tone, the character origin "From to walk and head", translation equivalents, and 12 usage examples. The English translation runs:

A way; a path; being at the head; the way that leads to; a thoroughfare on all sides. A principle. The priuciple [sic] from which heaven, earth, man, and all nature emanates. Le 理 is a latent principle; Tanu [sic] is a principle in action. Correct, virtuous principles and course of action. Order and good principles in a government and country. A word; to speak; to say; the way or cause from or by which; to direct; to lead in the way. To accord with or go in a course pointed out. The name of a country. Used by the Buddhists for a particular state of existence, whether amongst human beings or amongst brutes.

The usage examples include words from Taoism and Buddhism: "Taou 道 in the books of Laou-tsze is very like the Eternal Reason of which some Europeans speak; Ratio of the Latins, and the Logos of the Greeks."; and using zhì (帙, "cloth case for a book"), "Taou těë 道帙 a certificate by which the priests of Buddha are entitled to three days provision at every temple they go to."

=== Part III: An English and Chinese Dictionary ===
Part III, An English and Chinese Dictionary, was given without a Chinese supertitle. It comprises Morrison's English-to-Chinese dictionary and is arranged alphabetically from "A" ("A, 英文音母碎字之第一 Ying wǎn, yin moo suy tsze che te yǐh, The first letter of the English Alphabet.") to "Zone" ("ZONE, a girdle, 帶子 tae tsze; 圍帶 wei tai."). It was printed simultaneously in London by Black, Parbury, & Allen.

Its entries are terser than those of the Chinese volumes, particularly Part I, Volume 1. The entry for "way" is "WAY, road, or path, 路 loo; 道 taou; 途 too. A method or means, 法 fa". The fraught issue of Chinese names for God occasioned a somewhat fuller treatment:

GOD or the Deus of the Chinese was originally, and is still most generally 神 Shin; in the plural, Dii, 神鬼 Shin kwei, and 神祇 Shin ke. A sort of Supreme God, is in the ancient books expressed by 上帝 Shang-te. Genii of particular places are also expressed by 神 Shin, as 河神 ho shin, God of the river; 山神 shan shin, god of the hill, &c. All these gods are in Chinese notions inferior to 天 Ten, Heaven.

== Reception ==
Robert Morrison's Chinese-English dictionary has received both blame and praise. Considering that he was a self-taught lexicographer who compiled a dictionary of such a colossal size and scope, working with assistants who did not speak English, it would inevitably fall short of perfection, such the typographical errors and misprints noted above. Within his lifetime, the publication of Morrison's Chinese dictionary did not bring him universal acclaim, but instead triggered a controversy as to the authorship. In 1818 and again in 1830, the German orientalist Julius Klaproth accused Morrison of merely translating Chinese dictionaries rather than compiling a new or original one. In response to Klaproth's challenges, Morrison wrote an 1831 letter to the Asiatic Journal that describes the dictionary's compilation in detail.

I know of no better way of writing a Dictionary of any language, than that which I pursued; namely, to make use of all the native Dictionaries I could collect, with the original books referred to in them; to employ native scholars to assist me in consulting those several works, and in ascertaining their exact meaning... In the whole of the work, there was no mere copying from one book into another; no mere translation from one language into another; but an exercise of judgment and choice, throughout: and if any man may be called the author of a Dictionary, Morrison may justly be called the author of the Dictionary attributed to him.

In retrospect, a "major flaw" in Morrison's dictionary is the failure to distinguish the phonemic contrast between aspirated and unaspirated consonants. Herbert Giles's Chinese-English Dictionary says Morrison's 1819 volume gave no aspirates, "a defect many times worse" than would be omitting the rough breathing in a Greek lexicon. The contrast between aspirated and unaspirated consonants through the use of an apostrophe was added in 1865's reprint of the dictionary. Medhurst's 1843 edition attempted to insert aspirates, but omitted many and wrongly inserted others. Samuel Wells Williams's 1874 Syllabic Dictionary was apparently the first dictionary to get this distinction sorted out.

Another flaw is Morrison's treatment of some characters that have more than one pronunciation and meaning: 臭 means "foul; stinking; disgusting; disgraceful" when pronounced chòu but simply "odor; smell; scent" when read xiù. Morrison listed both senses with the first pronunciation and treated it as similar to the neutral and disagreeable senses of the English "smell":

臭 Chow Smell or flavor generally; scent; offensive smell; disagreeable odours; fume or effluvia. Stink; to smell; that which is morally offensive. The character is formed from Keuen 犬 A dog, in allusion to that animal finding its way by the scent. 香臭 Heang chow, a fragrant smell; 惡臭 Gŏ chow, a bad smell; 遺臭萬年 E chow wan nëen, to leave an eternal reproach on one's name; 其臭如蘭 Ko chow joo lan, it smells fragrant as the Lan-flower.

In these derived terms, the negative senses would be read chòu, but the pleasant "fragrant as an orchid" would use the pronunciation xiù. Another example is when he takes the 郎 in 招郎入室 to mean "bride" when the intended sense is a "bridegroom" being invited to live with his in-laws.

On the other hand, Morrison's Chinese dictionary has won critical acclaims from scholars all over the world since the publication of the first volume in 1815. Alexander Leith Ross wrote to Morrison that his dictionary had an extensive circulation in Europe, and would be "an invaluable treasure to every student of Chinese". The French sinologist Stanislas Julien described Part II as "without dispute, the best Chinese Dictionary composed in a European language". The American missionary William A. Macy said all the missionaries and scholars of Chinese had used Morrison's dictionary as the "common fountain" from which they could "obtain the knowledge they desired". One modern scholar calls Morrison's dictionary "the greatest achievement of any researcher of Chinese". Another describes the comprehensive bilingual dictionary compilation and publication project as "unprecedented and unsurpassed in 19th-century China". Wu and Zheng say Morrison's was the first widely used Chinese-English dictionary and has served as a "milestone in the early promotion of communications between China and the West". A recent book on Chinese lexicography says that although Morrison's dictionary "contained numerous errors" when examined from a modern perspective, "the dictionary delineated the basic configuration of a bilingual dictionary and shed a good deal of light upon the design and compilation of English-Chinese, Chinese-English, and other bilingual dictionary types". Morrison's obituary notice summarizes his dedication and contribution to the world, "In efforts to make this [Chinese] language known to foreigners and chiefly to the English, he has done more than any other man living or dead."

== Editions ==
- Morrison, Robert (1815). 字典 A Dictionary of the Chinese Language, in Three Parts, Vol. I — Part I. Macao: East India Company's Press.
- —— (1822). 字典 A Dictionary of the Chinese Language, in Three Parts, Vol. II — Part I. Macao: East India Company's Press.
- —— (1823). 字典 A Dictionary of the Chinese Language, in Three Parts, Vol. III — Part I. Macao: East India Company's Press.
- —— (1819). 五車韻府 A Dictionary of the Chinese Language, in Three Parts, Part II — Vol. I. Macao: East India Company's Press.
- —— (1820). 五車韻府 A Dictionary of the Chinese Language, in Three Parts, Part II — Vol. II. Macao: East India Company's Press.
- —— (1822b). A Dictionary of the Chinese Language, in Three Parts, Part III. Macao: East India Company's Press.
- —— (1865). 五車韻府 A Dictionary of the Chinese Language, Vol. I. Shanghai: London Mission Press, a reprint of Part II.
- —— (1913). A Dictionary of the Chinese Language... Zhonghua Book, a reprint of Part II.
