= Bullers Green =

Coordinates: 55.172°N 1.696°W

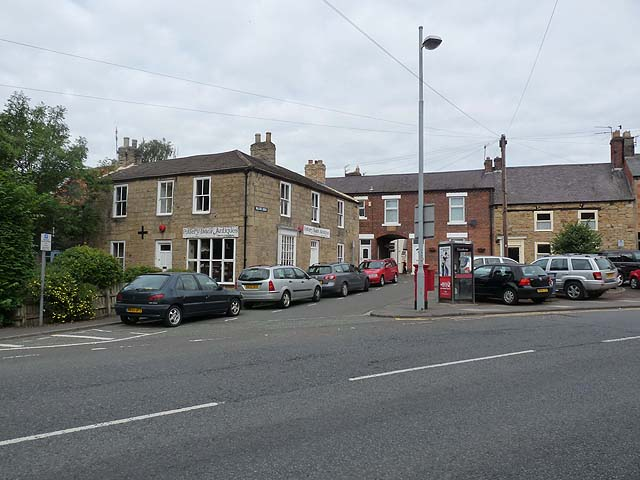

- Location within Northumberland
- OS grid reference: NZ194864
- Civil parish: Morpeth
- Unitary authority: Northumberland
- Ceremonial county: Northumberland
- Region: North East
- Country: England
- Sovereign state: United Kingdom
- Post town: MORPETH
- Postcode district: NE61
- Police: Northumbria
- Fire: Northumberland
- Ambulance: North East
- UK Parliament: Berwick-upon-Tweed

Bullers Green is a part of the town of Morpeth and former civil parish, Northumberland, England. In 1881 the parish had a population of 346.

== Governance ==
Bullers Green is in the parliamentary constituency of Berwick-upon-Tweed. Bullers Green was formerly a township in Morpeth parish, from 1866 Bullers Green was a civil parish in its own right until it was abolished on 1 April 1888 and merged with Morpeth and Newminster Abbey.

== Notable residents ==
- Bullers Green was the birthplace of Robert Morrison (1782–1834), the first Protestant missionary to China
