= George S. Morrison (diplomat) =

British diplomat (1830-1893)

George Staunton Morrison (1830 – 20 August 1893) was a British diplomat in the 19th century.

== Biography ==
Son of the British Missionary in China, Robert Morrison and Eliza Morrison, George Staunton Morrison was born in Macau. His name was given in honor of Sir George Staunton, who was a long time friend since his father arrived in Macau. He was intended to be the first British consul at Nagasaki but was delayed in arriving for the opening of the foreign settlement on 1 July 1859 and so C. Pemberton Hodgson served in his stead until Morrison's arrival on 6 August 1859. Morrison served as British Consul until December 1863. During Morrison's initial two-year term he established regulations for British citizens in Nagasaki, negotiated living and conditions trade between the foreign settlement and Japanese officials, made plans for an enlarged British Consulate, and generally established guidelines for the treaty port at Nagasaki based upon previous experience in China.

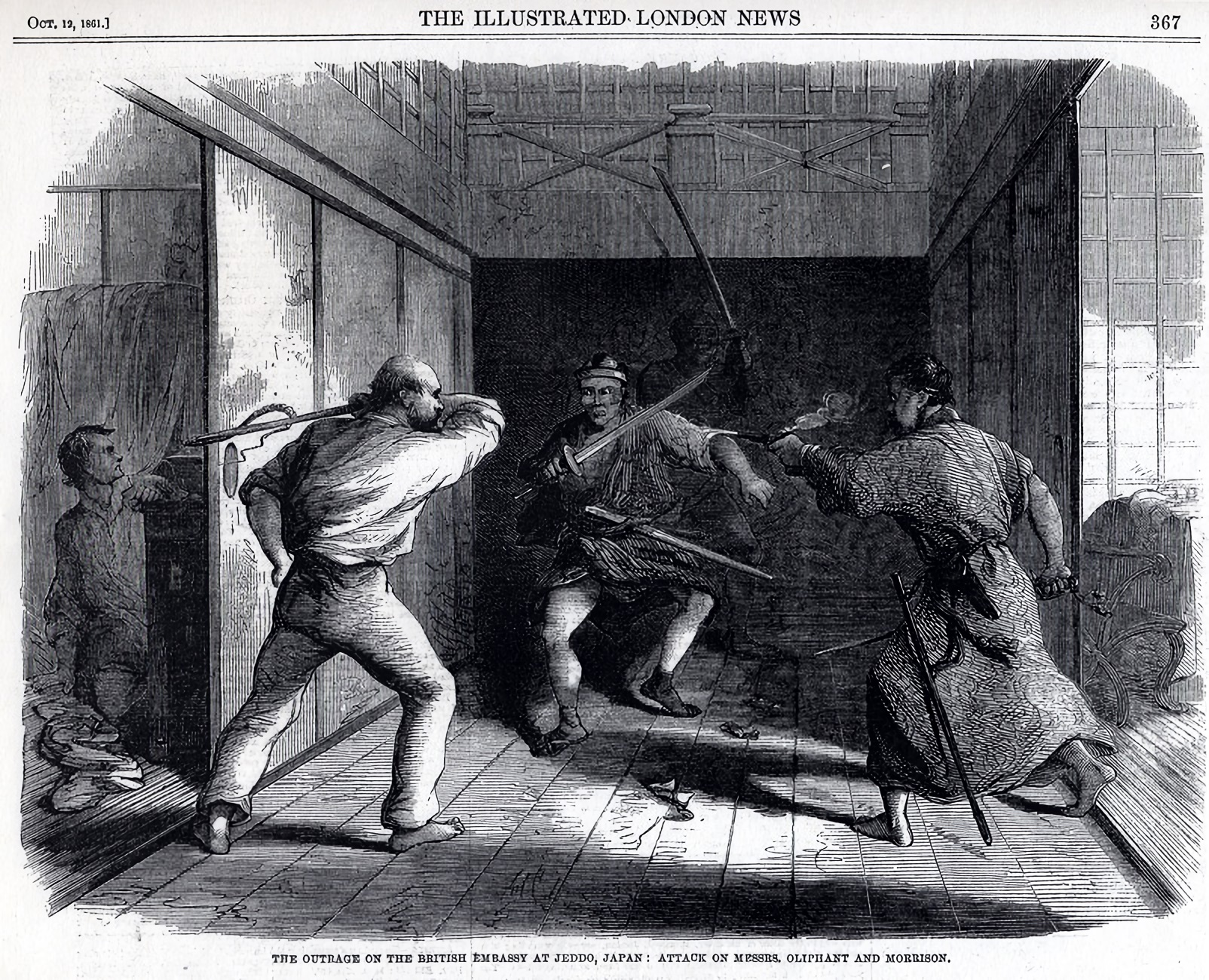
Attack on the British legation in Edo (Illustrated London News, 1861)

Morrison's term in Nagasaki was cut short when he and other British officials were attacked by samurai from the Mito domain on the night of 5 July 1861 at the British Legation in Edo. Morrison and the First Secretary Laurence Oliphant were severely wounded in the attack and left for England that autumn to recuperate.

Morrison returned to Nagasaki in April 1863, at a time when conditions for foreigners in the region were particularly dangerous. Satsuma and Chōshū officials were challenging the bakufu and threatening to kill foreigners in the treaty ports. Morrison requested British ships for protection and the situation seemed to be escalating towards war, though open conflict was, for the meantime, avoided. Morrison decided to leave his position for health reasons, returning once and for all to England. Allegations of a plot to assassinate him probably affected his decision to leave as well.

George Staunton Morrison died in Nice, aged 63.
