= Basilio Brollo =

Italian missionary to China

Reverend Basilio Brollo

Orders
- Ordination: 1674
- Rank: Priest

Personal details
- Born: March 25, 1648 Gemona, Italy
- Died: July 16, 1704 (aged 56) San-Yuan, China
- Occupation: missionary, philanthropist
- Profession: priest, bishop

Basilio Brollo (known in Chinese as Yeh Ch'ung-hsiao or Yeh Tsunhsiao; March 25, 1648 – July 16, 1704) was a 17th-century Italian Roman Catholic priest known for his missionary work in 17th-century China and the notable compilation of two editions of a Chinese-Latin dictionary.

== Life ==
He was born in Gemona, Italy in March 25, 1648.

=== Education ===
He studied under the guidance of his uncle, Don Andrea, the local town teacher, before attending the Jesuit school in Gorizia.

=== Career ===
He was ordained a Priest of the Order of Friars Minor in 1674.

==== Missionary work in China ====
He followed Bernardino della Chiesa on his voyage to China in 1680 and landed in Canton, China, on August 27, 1684, whereupon he took the Chinese name Yeh Tsun-hsiao and performed various missionary and philanthropic works in China.

=== Death ===
He died on July 16, 1704 in San-Yuan, China.

== Bibliography ==
He compiled two editions of a Chinese dictionary (Dictionarium sinico-latinum, 1694 and 1699) which was very popular in 18th-century Europe and was the first Chinese dictionary ever published.

His legacy is his five Chinese works:

- T’ien-chu-chiao Yao Chu-lüeh (Compendium of Catholic Prayers and Doctrine, 1687)
- Chien-cheng Shengshih Kuei-i (Confirmation's Notion and Rite, MS, author's preface 1689)
- Han Tzu Hsi I (a Chinese-Latin dictionary arranged by radicals), MS 1694
- Brevis Methodus Confessionis Instituendae

== See also ==
- Robert Morrison (missionary)
- List of Jesuit educational institutions
