= Jost Zetzsche =

German translator

- Born: Hamburg, Germany
- Education: University of Hamburg
- Occupations: Translator, sinologist, writer
- Known for: Translation Insights and Perspectives (TIPs) tool
- Notable work: Found in Translation; Translation Matters; The Bible in China

Jost Oliver Zetzsche (born in Hamburg, Germany) is a German–American English translator, sinologist and writer who lives in Oregon. Since 2016 he has been the curator of United Bible Societies' online Translation Insights and Perspectives (TIPs) tool.

== Biography ==
Jost Zetzsche currently lives in Reedsport, Oregon with his wife, Kristen.

Zetzsche earned his Master of Arts in Chinese Studies and German Linguistics, 1993, at the University of Hamburg. Afterward he earned a PhD in the field of Chinese history and linguistics from the same university in 1996 with a dissertation on the history of Bible translation in China.

Zetzsche joined the language industry in 1997. He has led localization projects in many major software, web, and documentation environments. In 1999, he co-founded International Writers' Group.

Until 2023, he worked as an English-German translator, a consultant in the field of localization and translation, and a writer on technical solutions for the translation and localization industry, earning an Honorary Lifetime American Translators Association membership in 2018.

== Works ==
- Encountering Bare-Bones Christianity, 2021.
- Characters with Character: 50 Ways to Rekindle Your Love Affair with Language, 2021.
- Translation Matters., 2017.
- Found in Translation with Nataly Kelly, 2012.
- The Bible in China: History of the Union Version or The Culmination of Protestant Missionary Bible Translation in China, 1999.

For a complete list of publications, see https://www.internationalwriters.com/aboutus/jostpub.htm.
