= Gu Changsheng =

Gu Changsheng (simplified Chinese: 顾长声; traditional Chinese: 顧長聲; pinyin: Gù Chángshēng July 19, 1919 – June 30, 2015) was a Chinese scholar of the history of Christianity in China.

Gu was born in Wuxi, Jiangsu, China and grew up in a Chinese Christian family. His parents worked for American missionaries of the Adventist Church. He was educated at a number of private schools run by the Adventist missionaries in mainland China and Hong Kong. During World War II, he served as an English-Chinese interpreter for the Nationalist Army.

After the Communist Part took power in China, the government launched an accusation campaign against the foreign missionaries in the early 1950s. Gu took part in this campaign and accused foreign missionaries of doing evil in China. Later, in the 1950s, he attended Peking University. However, he suffered at the hands of the Red Guards during the Cultural Revolution.

Gu became a history professor at East China Normal University in Shanghai. Gu "took the lead" on research into Chinese Protestantism in the 1980 with the publication of his most influential work, Missionaries and pre-1949 China (Chinese: 传教士与近代中国). In that book, Gu took a negative view of missionaries in China. He stated that missionaries were basically bad, and that even when they did good things, such as famine relief, they acted from bad motives. He accused William Alexander Parsons Martin of being a robber during the Boxer Rebellion, and Hudson Taylor of collecting intelligence for the British imperialists. He also criticized the missionaries for their anti-communist stances.

His memoir and first English-language book, Awaken: Memoirs of a Chinese Historian, was published by AuthorHouse in 2009. In this book Gu reverses his earlier position, saying that the majority of the missionaries were good. He also criticizes the Communist Party, and asserts the communism does not work in China in this book.

In the mid-1980s Gu was a visiting scholar in America for a couple of years. He returned to the United States in 1989 upon the invitation of the United States Congress to attend the National Prayer Breakfast. Soon after he arrived in America, he married (his second marriage) an American citizen. Gu lived in Hyannis, Massachusetts from the late 1980s until his death in June 2015 at the age of 95.

== See also ==
- Chinese house church
