= Peter Perring Thoms =

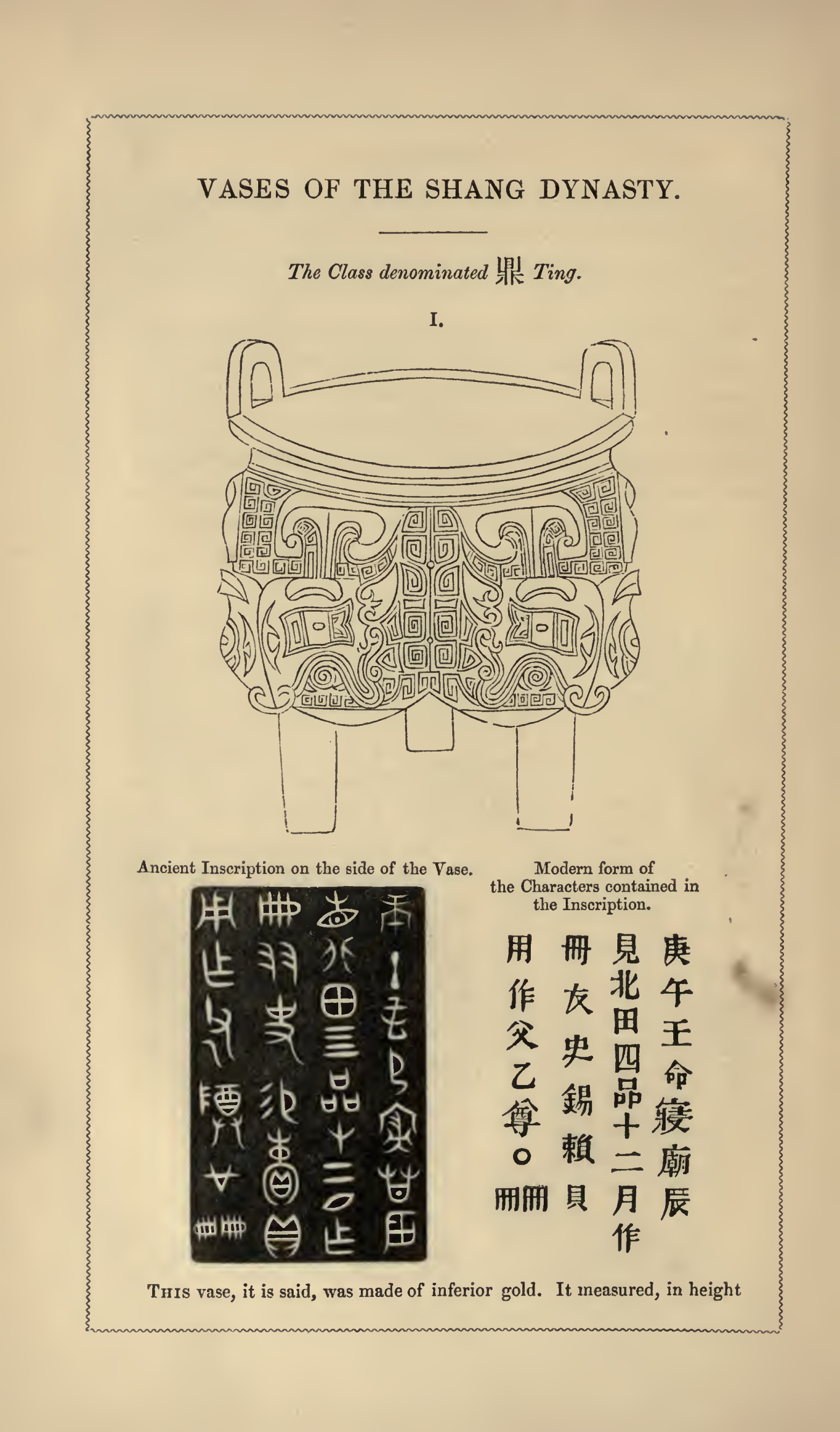
A page from Thom's work on ancient Chinese vases showing a ding or tripod cauldron

Peter Perring Thoms (1791 – December 1855) was an English printer and Chinese language translator based in Canton (Guangzhou) and Macau, China.

== Biography ==
Thoms was born in Exeter, Devon, around 1791.

=== Morrison's Chinese Dictionary ===
Thoms arrived in Macau on 2 September 1814. He brought with him a European press, movable type, blanks and other printing requisites from London at the East India Company's expense to assist in the printing of Robert Morrison's A Dictionary of the Chinese Language, which contained the largest number of Chinese characters printed to date alongside extensive English text. For the task, Thoms employed Chinese assistants to cut partial Chinese fonts using tin alloy. Volume I of the dictionary went to print in 1815, 1822 and 1823 followed by Volumes II and III in 1820 and 1822 respectively. According to Morrison writing in the preface to Volume I of the dictionary, Thoms had to work largely alone, serving as compositor, pressman, reader and corrector, "aided only by Natives who understood not the English language." Thom's received a salary of 1,250 dollars (£300) per annum from the East India Company. Over time, the fonts he created for Morrison's dictionary grew in numbers and variety and were used to print over twenty dictionaries and other works designed as Chinese learning aids until they were destroyed by fire in 1856.

=== Ancient Chinese vases ===
While in China, Thom developed an interest in ancient Chinese vases and began work on a book that would trace their development through the various dynasties of ancient Chinese history alongside "improvements in the written character during the same period". However, having completed the printing of Morrison's dictionary, he returned to England in March 1825 where he was unable to continue with his researches "from the want of the assistance of educated natives." In the 1830s he had his own printing shop at 12 Warwick Square, London. Sometime later Thoms met a native of Canton named A-lae, which enabled him to produce a short work on vases of the Shang dynasty dating from 1743 to 1496 BC. The illustrations and descriptions in the book followed an ancient Chinese work entitled the Bógǔ Tú (博古圖), which comprised sixteen large Chinese volumes. Woodcut engravings from the book produced by A-lae were exhibited at The Great Exhibition of 1851 held at Hyde Park, London. The Chinese Repository in its review of the book noted:

"This is a very pretty addition to our books on China, and besides having the minor merit of being an elegant specimen of printing, will also be prized by the sinologue as a valuable treatise on a little known subject."

=== Other activities ===
Thoms also translated Chinese poetry and contributed to the Journal of the Royal Asiatic Society. In 1849 he printed A Vocabulary Containing Chinese Words and Phrases Peculiar to Canton and Macau and to the Trade of those Places written by John Francis Davis, former British Superintendent of Trade in China and governor and commander-in-chief of the colony of Hong Kong until 1848.

== Death ==
Thoms died in December 1855 in Clerkenwell, London, aged 63.

== Bibliography ==
- Thoms, Peter Perring (1851). A Dissertation on the ancient Chinese Vases of the Shang Dynasty, from B.C. 1743 to 1496. London, P.P. Thoms.
- Thoms, Peter Perring (1824). Chinese Courtship in Verse. Macau, East India Company Press.
