= Denunciation Movement =

The Denunciation Movement (or "Accusation Movement") started on April 19, 1951, as a movement to rid the Christian church in China from foreign influence by denouncing and expelling foreign missionaries. It quickly spread, however, to include the arrest and imprisonment of popular Chinese Christian leaders, particularly evangelicals.

== Antecedents ==
The religious policy adopted by the People's Republic of China reflected a centuries-old tradition of attempting to regulate religion and a particular distrust of Christianity as an imported religion with ties to Western powers. Historically, Imperial China viewed the Christian faith as a foreign religion and sought to contain its spread. In 1812 the Jiaqing Emperor decreed that leaders among "Europeans" and "Tartars and Chinese" "deputed by Europeans" who engaged in missionary work should be executed or imprisoned and their followers should be exiled. In the mid-19th century, a few missionaries and their overseas supporters endorsed using force to open up China. Some took part in political endeavors, including acting as translators for treaty negotiations arising from the Opium Wars and other imperialist aggressions by Western powers. In these negotiations the missionaries/translators extracted from the government guarantees of protection of missionaries and their activities. As a result, the missionary endeavor became inextricably entwined in public perceptions with gunboat diplomacy and the opium trade. Missionaries were also accused of engaging promoting Western values and customs, a form of cultural imperialism. Resentment against Western domination boiled over in the Boxer Rebellion in 1899–1901, during which many missionaries and Chinese Christians were killed. In the 1920s, following the establishment of the Republic of China in 1911, disappointment over the ceding of Shandong Province to the Japanese in Treaty of Versailles following World War I, and the ensuing anti-Western nationalistic May 4th Movement, an Anti-Christian Movement revived accusations of missionary participation in imperialism.

The immediate precipitating factor of the Denunciation Movement was the entry of China into the Korean War on October 25, 1950. Since some missionaries had favored Chiang Kai-shek and the Kuomintang in the Chinese Civil War that brought the Chinese Communist Party to power, missionaries in general were viewed as potential collaborators with the Western powers in the Korean conflict. In March 1951 the Religious Affairs Bureau decreed a priority of eliminating imperialist influences over religious groups in China.

== History ==
The State Administrative Council led by Zhou Enlai called for a conference in Beijing in April 1951 to discuss "Handling of Christian Organizations Receiving Subsidies from the United States of America." That conference had three key outcomes:

- A "United Declaration" by delegates at the conference calling on churches and other Christian organizations "to thoroughly, permanently and completely sever all relations with the American missions and all other missions, thus realizing self-government, self-support and self-propagation in the Chinese church";
- Formation of the Preparatory Committee for the Oppose-America Assist-Korea Three-Self Reform Movement of the Christian Church (TSRM), the precursor of the Three-Self Patriotic Movement, to be part of China's United Front policy; and
- The start of the Denunciation Movement to purge imperialistic influences from the church in China.

The Denunciation Movement drew on resentments dating back to the Opium Wars in targeting foreign missionaries first. Because the United States took the lead in fighting on South Korea's side, American missionaries were the primary, but not sole, target. They were accused of being agents of imperialism and of committing many heinous crimes and immoral acts. In most cases the charges were pretexts for expelling the missionaries. Church leaders who refused to accuse and demonize foreign missionaries were forced to attend political study sessions aimed at thought reform. Large gatherings were convened to denounce the National Christian Council of China, the YMCA, the YWCA, the Christian Literature Society, the Anglicans, the Little Flock, the Seventh-Day Adventists, the Methodists, and the Church of Christ in China. Missionary endeavors, which had begun to withdraw following the establishment of the People's Republic, abandoned their efforts and were mostly gone from China in 1951 and 1952.

The Denunciation Movement had an unexpected side effect of sparking a growth in membership of non-TSRM indigenous churches, whose congregants claimed pride in practicing the three-self formula of self-government, self-propagation, and self-support. Accusations quickly spread to include influential Chinese Christian leaders and others whose cooperation with the TSRM was deemed inadequate. The Denunciation Movement overlapped with several other campaigns of the Communist Party in the early 1950s, including the Land Reform Campaign, the Campaign to Suppress Counterrevolutionaries, the Three-anti and Five-anti Campaigns, and the Withdraw from the Sects Movement. Similar tactics were using including extensive propaganda campaigns leading up to public accusation meetings, or struggle sessions in which the targets were portrayed as counter-revolutionaries.

Intense pressure was applied to a target's associates to accuse him in virulent terms, the underlying threat being that unless cooperation was rendered the potential accuser would become in turn an object of accusation and punishment. The accusations followed a common structure: "The general pattern of these denunciation speeches is as follows: First, a general statement of denunciation, usually couched in very strong, not to say violent language; then a list of particulars to susbstantiate the accusation; and finally a demand that the government mete out proper punishment for such betrayal of the Chinese people."

Initially, Christians were reluctant to participate in the movement and early meetings, ordered to start in May, "were not popular or successful." To push the effort forward, the New China News Agency of Shanghai published an article by Liu Liang-mo (刘良模), a YMCA secretary, on May 15 under the title "How to Hold a Successful Accusation Meeting." Liu wrote, "Every church and the city-wide church federation ought to first organize an accusation committee. They should first study whom they want to accuse, and whom to invite to do the accusing." In preliminary accusation meetings the committee was to "discover a few people who accuse with the greatest power and invite them to participate in the large accusation meeting," at the same time correcting any weaknesses in their speaking.

Premier Zhou Enlai issued a decree on July 24, part of which stipulated that churches receiving help from American missions should immediately sever all relations and that American mission boards should cease all activities in China. Because of the widespread failure to induce Christians to participate in the Denunciation Movement, Tian Feng announced in its August 11 issue that the TSRM was suspending establishing local chapters until the Denunciation Movement, which it called the "most important task for Christianity in China," was "done well." Helen Ferris, an American missionary to China, reported that having a successful accusation meeting against at least four of its own members had become a prerequisite for any group to register.

Some Chinese Christian leaders, notably Wang Ming-Dao, opposed holding accusation meetings. Wang considered the TSRM's leaders to be modernists who had denied key tenets of the Christian faith and hence were non-believers. After outlining his differences with the writings of Y. T. Wu and K. H. Ting, Wang wrote, "We will not unite in any way with these unbelievers, nor will we join any of their organizations." Wang was vehemently attacked by TSRM leaders, particularly Ting, who accused Wang of "hatred toward the New China." For his stand against TSRM Wang was arrested and charged as a "counter-revolutionary" in August 1955.

Liu-Liang Mo was specifically assigned to hold accusation meetings in Shanghai and the denunciation meetings held there were "particularly intense." Watchman Nee instructed the Local Churches in Shanghai to participate in the Denunciation Movement. One Shanghai meeting drew 12,000 attendees. By September 15, 1953, there had been 227 large-scale denunciation meetings in 153 cities. Eventually Liu was able to hold an accusation meeting in the Nanyang Road meeting place of the church in Shanghai, but the meeting fell far below Liu's expectations. Nee was subsequently arrested on charges related to the Wu-fan (Five-Anti) Campaign on April 10, 1952, though the propaganda leading up to his trial in 1956 and the TSRM resolution that supported the government's action focused on accusations of "counter-revolutionary" activities.

Other prominent leaders targeted in the Denunciation Movement were Bishop Chen Wen-yuan of the Methodist Episcopal Church; T. C. Chao, dean of the Yanjing School of Religion; Jing Dianying, founder of the Jesus Family; Marcus Cheng, president of the Chongqing Theological Seminary; and Chao Jingsan (Luther Shao), leader of the Disciples' Church. Though the victims of the Denunciation Movement were charged with being counter-revolutionaries, they were often selected "not because they had done or spoken anything unpatriotic, but only because they were, in the eyes of the officials, too influential or too popular."
