= Tian Feng (magazine) =

Chinese Christian magazine

- Editor-in-chief: Mei Kangjun
- Former editors: Shen Derong, Shen Cheng'en, Y. T. Wu
- Categories: Christian media
- Frequency: Monthly
- Publisher: Three-Self Patriotic Movement (TSPM) and China Christian Council (CCC)
- Total circulation (2000): 130,000
- Founder: Y. T. Wu
- Founded: 1945
- Country: China
- Based in: 169 Yuanmingyuan Road, Shanghai
- Language: Chinese
- Website: www.ccctspm.org/skywind
- ISSN: 1006-1274
- OCLC: 182562933

Tian Feng: The Magazine of the Protestant Churches in China
- Traditional Chinese: 天風．中国基督教杂志
- Simplified Chinese: 天风．中国基督教杂志
- Literal meaning: Heavenly wind
Transcriptions

Tian Feng: The Magazine of the Protestant Churches in China (Chinese: 天风．中国基督教杂志; lit. 'Heavenly wind') is the organ of the Three-Self Patriotic Movement (TSPM), the state-sanctioned body of Protestant Christians in China, and the most widely circulated Christian magazine in the country.

The magazine was founded in 1945 as Tian Feng: The Christian Weekly by Y. T. Wu and others as an initially liberal Christian publication published by the YMCA. In 1948 he published an article titled "The Present Day Tragedy of Christianity" criticizing foreign missionaries, for which he was fired as editor. Tian Feng became the official organ of the newly founded TSPM in 1949 (Note: Then called Three-Self Reform Movement) representing Protestants in the communist government's official religious policy. The magazine would side with the government, suppress unapproved Christian sects, and discredit theologians who were out of line. At the height of the Cultural Revolution, writing on theology became increasingly rare, and the magazine was discontinued in 1964. Following the Cultural Revolution, Tian Feng returned with a new inaugural issue on 20 October 1980. While still promoting officially sanctioned religious policy, Tian Feng occasionally expresses hopes for ecumenism or criticizes certain impediments to the freedom of religion in China.

== History ==
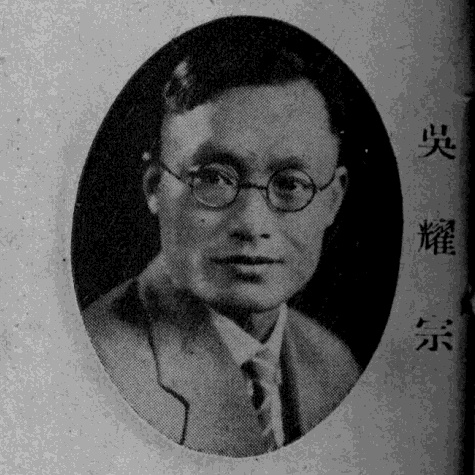
Y. T. Wu, the inaugural editor of Tian Feng fired in 1948 because of his Marxist views, had to apologize for not being Marxist enough just three years later.

Tian Feng was founded in 1945 as Tian Feng: The Christian Weekly. It was initially published in Chongqing by the YMCA and had liberal Christian leanings. Its founders included Y. T. Wu, who became the first editor. Some of Wu's most important theological articles were published in the journal. These included "The Present Day Tragedy of Christianity", which was published around Easter of 1948. In the article, he criticized foreign missionary activities in China and equated Protestantism with exploitative capitalism; he called them "two expressions of the same society". As a result, Wu was fired from his position as an editor of Tian Feng.

=== Organ of the Three-Self Patriotic Movement ===
The People's Republic of China was proclaimed in 1949. Tian Feng writings in the late 1940s and early 1950s sometimes exhibited enthusiasm about the prospects of the new society brought about by the Chinese Communist Revolution. Chinese Protestants ceased to credit foreign missionaries for their religious and humanitarian work in China and instead started criticizing them for being tools of Western imperialism. In 1949, Tian Feng became the official organ of the Three-Self Patriotic Movement (TSPM). That year it published an open letter signed by 19 Chinese Christian leaders calling for the perceived relationship of foreign missionaries and foreign governments to be exposed. The Chinese State Affairs Council had initiated a campaign to denounce foreign missionaries in 1951. Chinese Christian leaders now had to defile their former co-workers and confidants. Many such statements of denouncements were published in Tian Feng. Y. T. Wu, too, had to make a public confession in the magazine for not having supported the communists enough. Others also wrote their confessions in Tian Feng, but were purged. This was the fate of Isaac Wei, the leader of the independent True Jesus Church, who confessed in 1952, but ended up in prison. In 1954, Tian Feng was used to discredit Wang Ming-Dao, a prominent evangelist who was determined to keep his Christian Tabernacle church out of the TSPM. He had himself previously published uncompromising essays in the magazine. In 1956 it was the turn of Watchman Nee, a leader of the anti-communist local churches affiliation who had been long persecuted by the government, to be attacked in an editorial of Tian Feng. Hu Feng, a literary theorist who was opposed to politicization of literature, was also discredited on its pages, in 1955.

=== From "The Christian Manifesto" to the Cultural Revolution ===
During the 1950s and 1960s the contents of the magazine were markedly political. It contained views of the newly founded TSPM and its "unique synthesis of Christianity and nationalism". On 28 July 1950, the Chinese government set out "The Christian Manifesto", largely masterminded by Wu, that urged Chinese Christians to pledge allegiance to the new People's Republic. Tian Feng closely followed the success of the manifesto and the number of its signatories that in 1954 had reached 400,000, although this figure has since been disputed. During the 1950s it also published photos of the achievements of the Great Leap Forward. In addition to overtly political material, Tian Feng in its early TSPM years provided an "open forum" for adapting Christianity to the new communist China and some positive results were yielded in public discussions published in the magazine. At times, Tian Feng even acted as the "agony aunt" of Christian communities, coaching them on everyday practice. Local pastors and seminary professors would answer questions submitted by congregations. One article, for instance, gave advice about whether portraits of Mao Zedong needed to be hung on walls in churches. Meanwhile, the publication of essays that continued to condemn missionaries as imperialists continued.

With the mounting ultra-leftist tendencies that would ultimately lead to the Cultural Revolution, Christian activities became constrained. Although Tian Feng continued publication for the time being, its publication of theological articles ended in 1959.

Although the political flavor was toned down from 1960 on, the magazine remained a "mouthpiece of the government". At the same time, issues became progressively thinner until publication ceased in 1964. The paper was continued after the end of the Cultural Revolution. Its first new printing was on 20 October 1980 with 15,000 copies.

Throughout the years, Tian Feng acted as an important platform of publishing for K. H. Ting, the chairman of TSPM.

Most recently, since the TSPM and China Christian Council (CCC) have begun their controversial "Reconstruction of Theological Thinking" project, Tian Feng has lost subscribers.

== Format ==
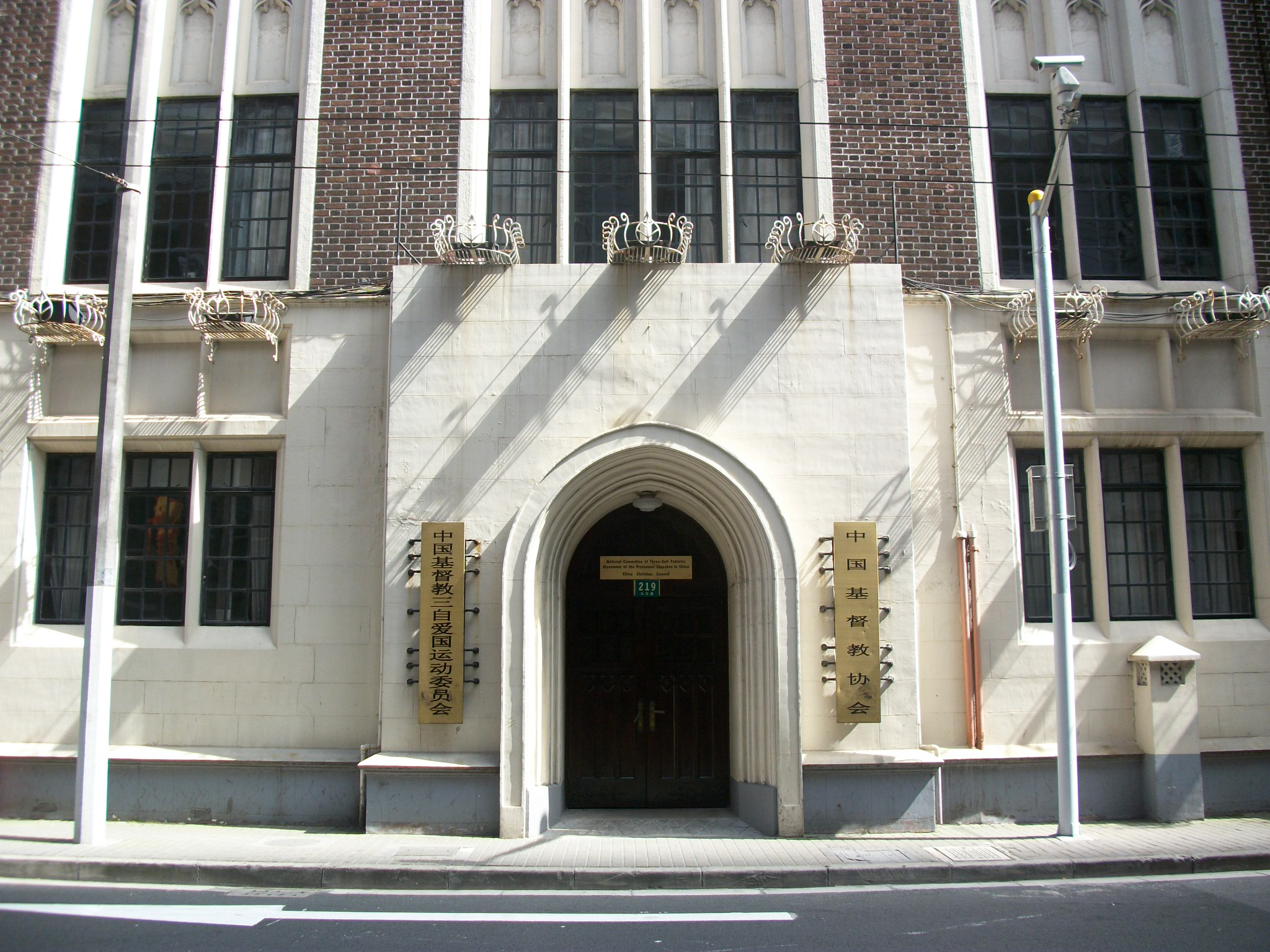
The office of the Three-Self Patriotic Movement (TSPM) and China Christian Council (CCC). Tian Feng is jointly published by these lianghui (double organization) in Shanghai.

Tian Feng is now the most popular Christian magazine in China and is distributed on a nationwide basis. At times, it has been the only such magazine available. It is the only Protestant magazine that is sold abroad.

Since publishing restarted in 1980, Tian Feng has been a monthly magazine. It is published jointly by the National Committee of the TSPM and CCC in Shanghai. For CCC, its publishing activities are run by its Tian Feng Editorial Committee.

The magazine disseminates the views of TSPM and CCC as well as religious policy of the Chinese government, along with devotional articles. Typical contents also include poems, color photographs, church news, sermons, and Bible studies. Recent issues have shown a widening of its scope and an "outward-looking ecumenism" of the state-sanctioned Protestant churches of China. The magazine also publishes stories about coping with economic change in China, family problems and friction between different churches. Recent themes have included criticism of Pentecostalism, cults, and the unofficial hymnal Canaan Hymns. On the other hand, the magazine has also criticized the government and its State Administration for Religious Affairs for curtailing religious freedom.

Tian Feng is distributed by local Three-Self Committees and Christian Councils and has a circulation of 130,000. Subscribers include overseas Chinese churches. Its editor-in-chief is Mei Kangjun. Previous editors include Shen Derong and Shen Cheng'en.

The magazine is published in Chinese. Since 1991, the Hong Kong–based Amity Foundation, aligned with the TSPM and CCC, has published bi-monthly digests of the magazine in English. In 2002, Tian Feng was given an award for being one of the best Shanghai-based magazines.

== See also ==
- History of the People's Republic of China
- List of magazines in China
- Political theology in China
- Protestant missions in China
- Protestantism in China
- Tiān
