= House church (China) =

Protestant assemblies in China outside of state-sanctioned churches

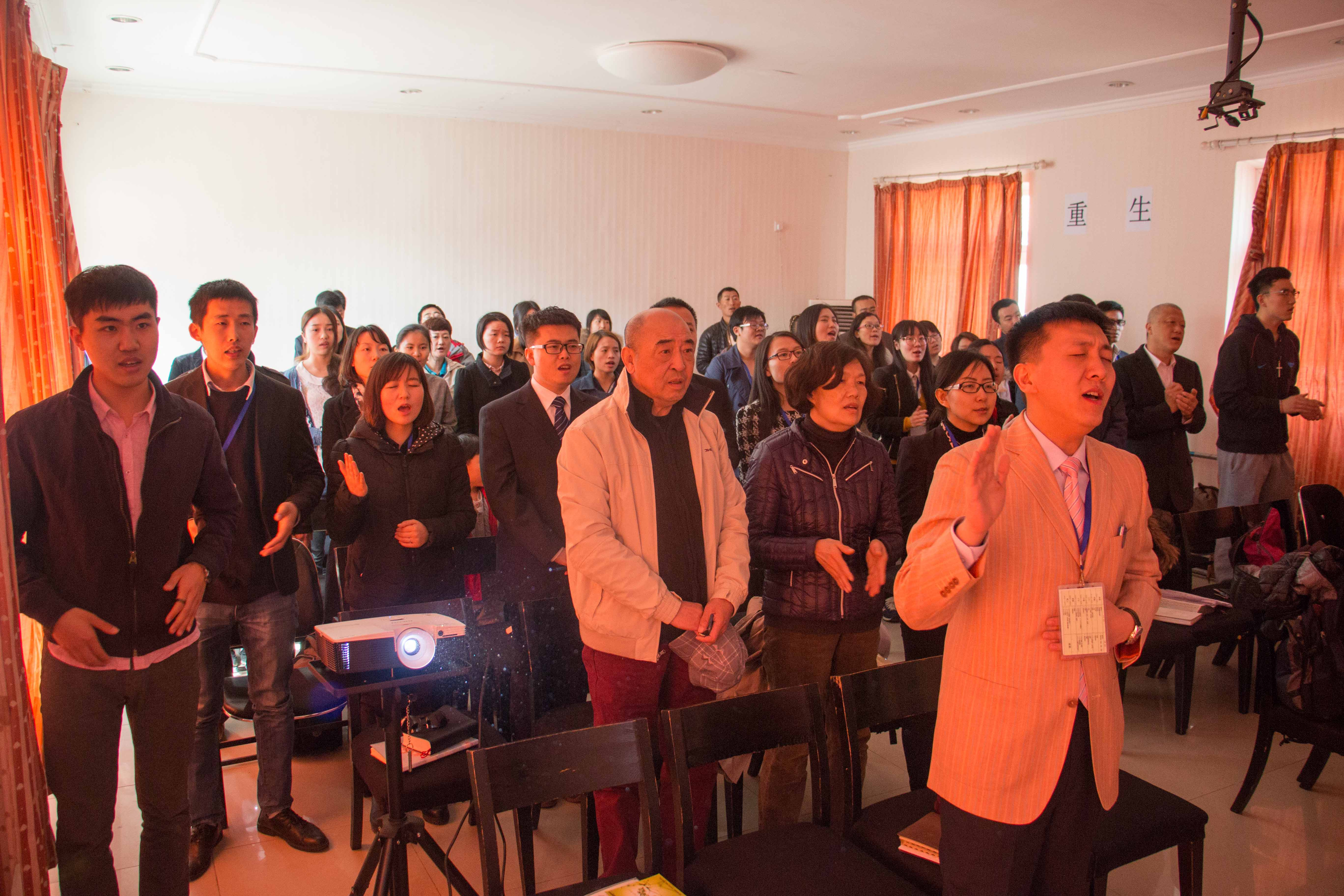
A house church in Shunyi, Beijing

In China, house churches or family churches (Chinese: 家庭教会; pinyin: jiātíng jiàohuì) are Protestant assemblies in the People's Republic of China that operate independently from the state-sanctioned Three-Self Patriotic Movement (TSPM) and China Christian Council (CCC). They represent a tradition of independent churches that would not come under the control of the Chinese Communist Party dating back to Wang Ming-Dao in the 1950s. However, they came into their current form of existence after the Cultural Revolution in the early-1980s.

== Terminology ==
In contemporary China, house churches are often of significant size, do not operate in houses, and operate openly. Some scholars prefer to use terms such as "unregistered church" to speak about the Protestant phenomenon, because these groups can reach several hundred and do not always literally meet in someone's home. Academic Yanfei Sun suggests "independent protestant church". Others suggest the need to discard the "house church" vs. "TSPM church" dichotomy as there is a lot that blurs these divisions, including the relationship between the two groups themselves.

While these groups are sometimes described as "underground churches" (地下教会; dìxià jiàohuì), this term is generally associated with Catholic assemblies who have chosen to operate independently from the state-sanctioned Catholic Patriotic Association and the Chinese Catholic Bishops' Conference.

K. H. Ting, one of the key leaders of the TSPM and the CCC for many years, did not like the term "house church" and preferred to use the term "house gathering" (家庭聚会; jiātíng jùhuì). This was because he found designations such as "house church" and "official church" as returning to the pre-Cultural Revolution practice of denominationalism.

Moreover, as a result of the rapid urbanization of China since the 1990s, there has been a growing development within urban Christianity. Some congregations have preferred to self-identify as being part of a "third church" to differentiate from both traditional house churches and TSPM churches.

== History ==
In 1949, the Chinese Communist Party (CCP) gained control of mainland China and established the People's Republic of China (PRC). Shortly thereafter, well-known Christian leader Y. T. Wu authored and published "The Christian Manifesto", which publicly supported the CCP's policy of overseeing the church for the sake of national unity and progress and called on all Protestant Christians to follow suit. In the 1950s, Wu successfully oversaw the signing of "The Christian Manifesto" by roughly half of the Protestant population across China. He also played a key role in creating and leading the Three-Self Patriotic Movement (TSPM), a state-sanctioned governing body for Protestant Christianity in China.

However, China's independent churches, championed by Wang Ming-Dao, strongly resisted the TSPM both for its allegiance to a political entity and its liberal theological leanings. As a result of their refusal to join with the TSPM, an entire generation of China's independent pastors were severely persecuted and their churches forced to close. These resistant churches often began meeting in undisclosed locations, such as individual homes or fields, thus gaining the name "house church". Despite the TSPM's efforts to maintain a good relationship with the CCP, it too was eventually dismantled and persecuted during the Cultural Revolution (1966–1976) so that all Christian practice in China became persecuted and hidden. During the period from the 1950s to 1970s, the strongest house church networks could be found in China's countryside.

Due to the changes in religious policy after the end of the Cultural Revolution, in 1980, the Three-Self Patriotic Movement would be reinstated and the China Christian Council would be formed. Protestant congregations that wished to worship publicly registered with the TSPM, but those that did not would eventually be termed house churches.

Since the 1990s, a number of developments have resulted from the rapid urbanization experienced in Chinese society. While house churches originated as being quite independent of one another, a number of house church networks have developed, with some headquartered in Henan and Zhejiang provinces. These networks have sent missionaries all over the country and have even started sending them abroad to neighboring states.

The rapid urbanization has also resulted in migration to China's urban centers and the rise of urban house churches. Some of these have developed through migrant worker communities and university students. Other new communities can be seen among urban intellectuals and entrepreneurs, the latter termed "boss Christians" (老板基督徒; lǎobǎn jīdūtú).

After the beginning of the Hu-Wen administration, house churches increasingly operated openly, and have been able to build churches and display religious symbols, becoming increasingly similar in outward appearance to state-sanctioned churches.

The house church has grown by some estimations to tens of millions of Christians. They had demonstrated national-level influence when Christians organized to provide relief to the deadly 2008 Sichuan earthquake, a disaster which the government was slow to handle.

In 2018, the CCP began to introduce a series of new religious regulations. It closed Zion Church in Beijing and Early Rain Covenant Church in Chengdu, whose pastor, Wang Yi, was given a jail sentence of 9 years, the longest given to a pastor in several decades. House churches and their members have faced more frequent crackdowns during the annual Two Sessions. In October 2025, the Chinese government arrested dozens of Zion Church members in Beijing, Shanghai, Shenzhen, and other cities. In January 2026, the authorities arrested leaders of the Early Rain Covenant Church.

Western evangelical Christian groups express interest in Christianizing China and support the development of independent Protestant churches. Western media and human rights advocacy groups likewise express support for independent Protestant churches. Western politicians expressing support for independent Protestant churches in China may be motivated to do so by factors including personal conviction, responding to lobbying efforts, appealing to voters or other supporters, or to develop leverage in international relations with China.

== Legality ==
House churches in China are generally considered illegal, yet smaller house churches of less than 25 members tend to be tolerated by the government. However, some have grown to a fairly large size, such as the Shouwang Church which reached 1,000 members at its height. House churches today still experience persecution, though the situation tends to differ depending on the region. American political scientist Carsten T. Vala argues that house churches are subject to persecution when they cross red lines, which include, apart from size, rapid growth, active proselytization, the attempt to form national networks, contacts with foreign Christian organization, and criticism of the government.

House churches are often reluctant to become official by joining the state-sanctioned Three-Self Patriotic Movement (TSPM). In addition to accepting the worrying institutional memory of government use of the TSPM to suppress churches during the 1950s, groups joining the TSPM would have to agree to limits on the time and location of religious activities, among other restrictions. Further, some Christians find certain TSPM teachings inconsistent with their personal faith. All churches submit to government monitoring as a condition of state approval; the government has direct oversight over TSPM congregations and can insist that Christians honor the government, in addition to traditional Christian theological teachings. Many Chinese Christians choose to attend house churches to practice their faith without government interference.

Some house churches, however, submit their activities for government approval in an attempt to follow the law as closely as possible while remaining independent. In some instances, authorities have allowed such house churches to continue to operate. In others, officials have arrested pastors, congregants, and others affiliated with the targeted congregations, and have even gone so far as the destruction of buildings used for worship.

== Pentecostal characteristics ==
The first Pentecostal missionaries arrived in China shortly after the Azusa Street Revival as part of groups such as the Christian and Missionary Alliance, the China Inland Mission, the Pentecostal Missionary Union, and the Assemblies of God. These groups would also be instrumental in inspiring the creation of indigenous Pentecostal groups, such as the True Jesus Church and the Jesus Family.

Today, Chinese house churches are commonly described as being Pentecostal or charismatic. This is often the case due to the experience of miraculous healing. According to some surveys, 90% of converts to Protestant Christianity, in both house churches and TSPM churches, cite healing as a reason for their conversion.

However, a number of scholars have attempted to reconsider this description, using phrases such as "Pentecostal-like" or "Pentecostal characteristics" to indicate this ambiguity.

The Assemblies of God theologian Simon Chan argues that "an adequate definition of Pentecostalism cannot be restricted to phenomenological description" – that is, based on experiences. Chan continues to explain that classical Pentecostal beliefs such as Spirit-baptism and speaking in tongues are not prevalent in Chinese churches, when compared with miraculous healing.

Edmond Tang has pointed out that only a few groups, like the True Jesus Church and the Jesus Family, can trace themselves back to missionaries coming from Pentecostal denominations. Many of the Pentecostal characteristics in Chinese churches are seen to have parallels with Chinese folk religion, such as trances, ancestral worship, and the use of talismans. Some have described this as a folk religionization of Christianity.

Robert Menzies disputes these views, arguing, "The common thread that unites Pentecostals in China with other Pentecostals around the world is their sense of connection with the apostolic church as reflected in the book of Acts."

The hymnal Canaan Hymns, rich in pneumatological themes, is widely used.

== Similar organization in other religions ==
While foreign media often focus discussion about house churches mainly with relation to Protestantism, other religious traditions in China have chosen a similar form of organization. These include house assemblies of Han Chinese following Tibetan Buddhism, led by lamas and tulkus, Buddhist and Baháʼí Faith study groups, unregistered Zhengyi and vernacular forms of Taoism, and various folk religious groupings such as Yiguandao.
