= Political theology in China =

Political theology in China refers to the religious beliefs and principles that shape politics in China. For two millennia, China was organized on a Confucian understanding of religion and politics, often discussed in terms of Confucian political philosophy. At various points in its history, Chinese Buddhism offered an alternative to the political implications of Confucianism. However, since the mid-twentieth century, communist understandings of religion have dominated the discourse.

Christianity entered China during the imperial period, with the Church of the East's interaction with Emperor Taizong and Jesuit missionaries in the Ming court. But it developed primarily in the 20th and 21st centuries after the establishment of the Republic of China and the People's Republic of China. This is particularly true through the establishment of the Protestant Three-Self Patriotic Movement and the Catholic Patriotic Association, the rise of underground and house churches, and interactions with the secular academy.

== Imperial China ==
For over two millennia, from the Han dynasty (206 BC – AD 220) until the Qing dynasty (1644–1912), the dominant ideology that was upheld as state orthodoxy was Confucianism. During much of this time, all other religions needed to be registered and administered under the Confucian political system.

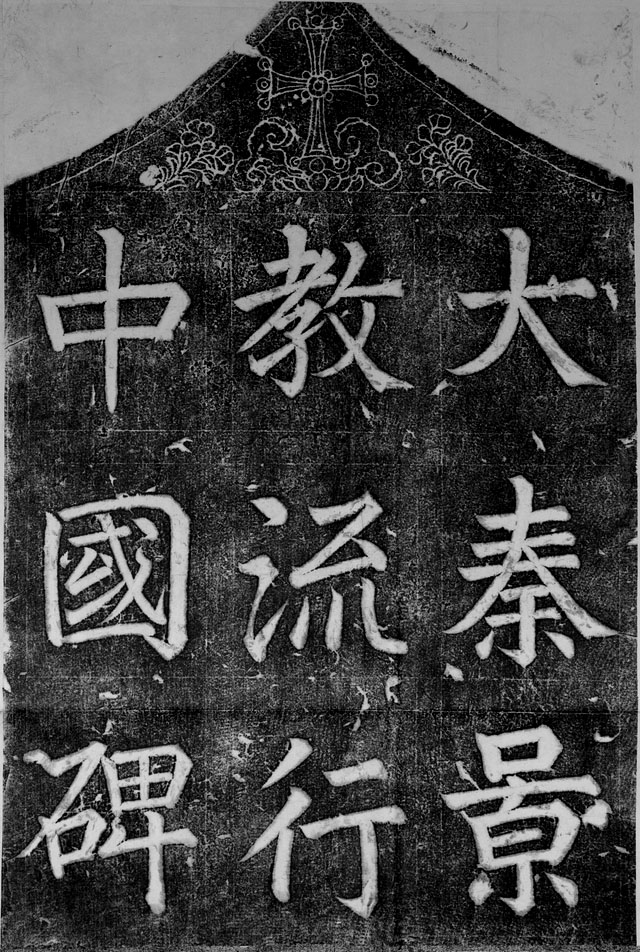
The Xi'an Stele, erected in 781, recording interactions between the Church of the East and Emperor Taizong

This would shape the history of the relationship between Christianity and politics in China could be traced to Tang Dynasty (618–907), when scholars believe that Christianity first came to China. Emperor Taizong and his successors of adopted the policy of religious tolerance. They allowed the mission of Church of the East monks and invited them to translate scriptures for the empire. In 845, during the Great Anti-Buddhist Persecution, the Church of the East was misunderstood as a sect of Buddhism and was banned by Emperor Wuzong. In Yuan Dynasty (1271–1368), several Mongol tribes converted to Christianity through the Church of the East. During this time, the Pope of the Roman Catholic Church also sent envoys to the Mongol Empire capital Khanbaliq (present-day Beijing).

In Ming Dynasty (1368–1644), Jesuits initiated mission in China. Matteo Ricci would be the most well known among these missionaries. Jesuits exerted considerable influence at court via the policy of accommodation and converted several senior officials, such as Xu Guangqi. In Qing dynasty (1644–1912), Catholic missionaries still played important roles at court as consultants of emperors. In the 18th century, the Chinese Rites controversy had raised tension between the Vatican and Qing dynasty's Emperors. Emperor Yongzheng was formally against Christian converts among Manchu people and banned the mission again.

After the First Opium War (1839–1842), with the aid of several unequal treaties, Christian missionaries were allowed to evangelize in China and continue to import the Western civilization to China. Due to an impression that missionaries were allies with foreign colonial governments, many Chinese became hostile to Christianity. This further influenced the relationship between Christianity and politics. Many anti-missionary riots (Jiao'an), the Boxer Rebellion, and the anti-Christian movement can be considered as the consequences of such relationship.

== Republic of China ==
The 20th century witnessed the emergence of new Chinese political thinkers. The May Fourth movement emphasized a climate of strong political engagement, under the mantra of "Mr. Science" and "Mr. Democracy," and the growing ferment around the national salvation movement.

Kang Youwei advocated the idea of a Confucian church as the state religion of China. Taixu would seek to reform Chinese Buddhism, to contribute to the building of Chinese society and politics. Christian leaders like Y. T. Wu, in the face of the anti-Christian movement, appealed to revolutionary theory and constructed a Chinese Christian theology.

== People's Republic of China ==
Political theology changed again in 1949, after the founding of the People's Republic of China. This period raised questions as to how religion was to negotiate a political space dominated by Marxism. While the new government promoted atheism, Maoist China did not have an all-out war against religion. There was a recognition of freedom of religious belief (Chinese: 宗教信仰自由; pinyin: zongjiao xinyang ziyou) embedded in the 1954 Constitution of China and, like the previous Nationalist government, there was a recognition of five major religions: Buddhism, Daoism, Catholicism, Protestantism, and Islam. All religions were now regulated under the United Front Work Department. Under the influence of Li Weihan, religion was recognized as having enduring qualities, the so-called "Five Characteristics of Religion" (i.e. commonality, internationality, ethnicity, and therefore complexity and persistence), and therefore should be tolerated.

From the late-1950s (under the Anti-Rightist Campaign and the Great Leap Forward) until the Cultural Revolution (1966–1976), religion was strongly politicized and eventually de facto outlawed. It would not be until the death of Mao Zedong and the end of the Cultural Revolution that religion would regain its voice in the political space. Part of this was made possible by the 1982 introduction of a Communist Party policy known as "Document 19", which again underscored the protection of freedom of religious belief. This opened up the 1980s to a liberalization of religious practice when compared to earlier periods.

=== Protestantism ===
Chinese Protestant leaders under Maoist China had to decide how to deal with the relationship with the atheistic government. There were different attitudes and theologies among Chinese Christians. Some of them, such as Y. T. Wu, who were willing to support the new government, helped to pen the Christian Manifesto and initiated the Three-Self movement (TSPM) in 1950s; they reconstructed theology in terms of cooperation. Others, such as Wang Mingdao, were unwilling to endorse the radical TSPM and refused to support the new government, are regarded as the forerunners of the present-day house church.

In the 1950s Denunciation Campaigns, some Christian leaders, such as Wang Mingdao, Watchman Nee, from the opposing camp were arrested and sentenced in the name of counter-revolutionaries. During the ten years of Cultural Revolution (1966–1976), all the religious activities were banned and many Christians met and worshiped in the Christians' houses.

In the 1980s, religious activities recovered and churches gradually opened. However, Christians unwilling to join the TSPM churches chose to gather in unregistered house churches, commemorating in personal houses or apartments. K. H. Ting and Wang Weifan were leaders and representatives of the TSPM church. Wang Mingdao and Wang Yi would be representatives of the house church; the latter Wang is the pastor in the urban church in Chengdu which is not a traditional house church yet still claims the link to the house church.

=== Catholicism ===
In the 1950s, after Zhou Enlai saw the possibilities in Protestantism with the TSPM, a similar approach was taken with Catholicism leading to the formation in 1957 of the Catholic Patriotic Association (CPA), severing ties with the Vatican. Those who chose not to affiliate with the CPA and remain loyal to the Pope and the Vatican are often considered part of the underground church.

Ignatius Kung Pin-Mei, the Catholic bishop of Shanghai, opposed the formation of the CPA and, along with several hundred bishops and church leaders, was arrested on 8 September 1955. He viewed the CPA as being schismatic and, therefore, not in union with the universal Roman Catholic Church. Kung criticized China's lack of religious freedom and reckoned that Chinese Catholics "do not have the freedom to worship." When he was interviewed by the Soul Magazine in 1993, Kung expressed his sympathy for the underground Catholics and Bishops under the Communist government and claimed that, "The government should understand from history that every time the Church was persecuted, the Church has always survived and grown out of the persecution."

Another significant figure was Aloysius Jin Luxian, who was arrested alongside Kung on 8 September 1955. However, after being released from prison in 1982, he took several leadership roles within the CPA, including becoming founding rector of the Sheshan Seminary and bishop of Shanghai in 1988, without Vatican approval.

=== Confucianism ===
Despite the Anti-Confucius developments of the Cultural Revolution, since the 1980s, there has been a restored interest in Confucianism as offering a renewed political ideology for mainland China. Part of this has included the introduction of New Confucianism from Taiwan and North America. Some have advocated for the building of new Confucian churches in the country. Others, such as Jiang Qing have advocated for a new form of constitutional Confucianism.

=== Academy ===
Since the late 1980s there has been a growing interest in Christianity among academics in China's secular universities. Often described as Cultural Christians, many of whom are not self-identified Christians, these scholars have been drawn to Christianity as a source for the modernization of China. One of the key figures of this movement, Liu Xiaofeng at Renmin University of China, in the 2000s began to draw on the political theology of Carl Schmitt for engaging the Chinese political arena. Others, such as Xie Zhibin from Tongji University in Shanghai, has attempted to offer a public theological engagement based on the theology of Max Stackhouse. Most recently, Zhuo Xinping of the Chinese Academy of Social Sciences has advocated for the sinicization or Chinization (Chinese: 中国化; pinyin: Zhongguo hua) of Christianity both politically and culturally.

== Key documents ==
=== The Christian Manifesto ===
"The Christian Manifesto" was published in July 1950 and its original title was "Direction of Endeavor for Chinese Christianity in the Construction of New China." The founding group of the Three-Self Patriotic Movement, including Y. T. Wu, drafted the document in consultation with Premier Zhou Enlai. During the 1950s, 400,000 Protestant Christians publicly endorsed and signed this document.

=== The 95 Theses of the Chinese Reformed Church ===
In August 2015 Wang Yi posted a document titled "Reaffirming Our Stance on the House Churches: 95 Theses" in an attempt to reaffirm the Chinese house church's position in the relationship between government and society. Echoing Martin Luther's 95 theses, these Chinese 95 theses demonstrate his opinion of the church-state relationship from the perspective of the house church.
