= Three Views Education Movement =

Chinese Communist Party campaign

The Three Views Education Movement (Chinese: 三视教育运动; pinyin: Sān shì jiàoyù yùndòng) was a political and ideological education campaign launched by the Chinese Communist Party (CCP) in the early days of the People's Republic of China during the Korean War to eliminate pro-Americanism, admiring, and fearful of the United States sentiments in Chinese society. The campaign aimed to cultivate a sense of hatred, contempt, and disdain for American imperialism.

== Background ==
On 25 June 1950, the Korean War broke out. Before the top leadership of the Central Committee of the Chinese Communist Party decided to enter North Korea to participate in the war, there were differences of opinion. At the enlarged meeting of the Politburo held on the afternoon of 4 October, "most people did not approve of sending troops or had various doubts about sending troops". The outbreak of the Korean War, especially the United States' intervention in Korea, caused "a great deal of disagreement" among the Chinese people, and "caused a certain degree of ideological fluctuation and confusion among the masses at all levels".

At that time, China had just experienced the Second Sino-Japanese War and the Chinese Civil War, and there were many "pro-American, admiring American, and fearing American" thoughts in society. The "fear of America" sentiment was prevalent in the minds of most people, and they were pessimistic about China's involvement in the Korean War, believing that "the United States has strong economic strength and excellent weapons, while the People's Liberation Army is a bunch of bumpkins and cannot fight against the United States. The People's Volunteer Army going to Korea to participate in the war is asking for trouble". The "admiring American" and "pro-American" mentality was mainly prevalent among the "national bourgeoisie, upper-class intellectuals and some students" at that time. According to the survey at that time, "there was still a strong pro-American mentality among some professors, capitalists, believers and church schools, which needed to be eradicated with great effort"; "among professors and business people, many people still had the mentality of admiring American and fearing American or were hypocritical about the military action of resisting the United States and aiding Korea".

These factors hindered the CCP from mobilizing social resources to participate in the war. Moreover, from the perspective of the construction of communist state consciousness, it is necessary to establish an opposing side in the binary opposition structure, so such ideas must be eliminated. However, even without the Korean War, the CCP attached great importance to eliminating the influence of the United States on China. In 1949, the U.S. State Department published the China White Paper on Sino-US relations, and Mao Zedong unusually wrote several articles to refute and respond to it. After gradually eliminating the ideas of "pro-American", "admiring American" and "fearing American" through intervention in the Korean War, Zhou Enlai believed that "this is an even more invaluable gain" because "this kind of aggressive poison did not invade in a day, but was gradually and unconsciously confused and numbed". It can be seen that its significance is far beyond simple war mobilization.

== History ==
"Hating America, despising America, and scorning America" is the most important content of the "three views" propaganda and education. In order to cooperate with the development of the propaganda and education movement, the Publicity Department of the Chinese Communist Party specially compiled a booklet entitled How to Understand America (Propaganda Outline), the main argument of which is divided into three parts:

- The first part, "Hate for the United States because it is the mortal enemy of the Chinese people," lists dozens of examples from the present to history to illustrate the United States' aggression against China.
- The second part is "Despise the United States because it is a decadent imperialist country and the headquarters of reaction and depravity in the world," pointing out that the United States is controlled by a small number of capitalists, and its domestic policy is to oppress and exploit the people, strangle democracy, and stifle culture; its foreign policy is one of aggression and war.
- The third part is "despise the United States because it is a paper tiger and can be defeated", because it is politically isolated and has weaknesses such as an overly long front and insufficient troops. Although it has atomic bombs, it is not scary, etc.

=== Publicity and promotion methods ===
Shortly after the People's Volunteer Army entered the war in 1950, the Central Committee of the Chinese Communist Party issued instructions on current affairs propaganda, proposing that "in order to enable all the people to correctly understand the current situation, establish confidence in victory, and eliminate the fear of the United States, all localities should immediately launch a propaganda campaign on current affairs". After the publication of the Joint Declaration of the Democratic Parties on 4 November 1950, the propaganda offensive of the "Three Views" education campaign was officially launched in mainland China.

Transmitting a certain amount of educational information through news media is an important form of propaganda and education. From November 1950 to 1953, propaganda about the Korean War became the central theme of Chinese news agencies. The People's Daily, Xinhua News Agency, and the Central People's Broadcasting Station, among other media, promoted the war by publishing relevant editorials and commentaries and by publishing special issues. According to statistics, from 1951 to 1954, the People's Daily published an average of about 20,000 words of propaganda about the Korean War every month. At the same time, the Chinese Communist Party began to establish a system of propagandists and reporters, setting up propagandists in every branch of the Communist Party and reporters in the leading organs at all levels of the Communist Party to cooperate with the news media in carrying out current affairs propaganda. This system of propagandists and reporters actually became an important auxiliary and supplement to the news media.

Through various meetings and denunciation meetings, the masses were able to "expose the brutal crimes of U.S. imperialism by presenting the vivid facts they had personally experienced, heard, and witnessed, so that their rational understanding of U.S. imperialism could be combined with their own genuine feelings, and they could establish a profound anti-American ideology". In December 1950, the CCP demanded that "gatherings be held in factories, government offices, schools, streets, organizations, and neighborhoods to denounce the crimes of U.S. imperialism and criticize the erroneous ideas of being pro-American, admiring America, and fearing America".

Organizing marches by people from different social strata in different regions was also a major means of promoting the "Three Views" education movement. On November 30, 1950, more than 40,000 industrialists and businessmen in Tianjin held a demonstration and march to "Resist America and Aid Korea". After the meeting, they sent a telegram to Mao Zedong, saying that they "have recognized the aggressive nature of the United States and expressed their determination to unite with people from all social strata" and "fight to the end to complete the sacred task of resisting America and aiding Korea and protecting the country". On December 26, 1950, the industrialists and businessmen in Shanghai held a demonstration and march with 150,000 participants. Industrialists and businessmen in other cities such as Beijing, Harbin, Qingdao, Xi'an, and Wuhan also held demonstrations and marches with tens of thousands to hundreds of thousands of participants in the first half of December 1950. Among the rallies and parades with people from all walks of life, the demonstrations held during the May Day holiday in 1951 were the largest, with more than 186.43 million people from all walks of life participating, accounting for more than 39% of the total population of the country. If the number of people who participated in the parade before May Day is added, more than half of the population of the country participated in the parade.

Artistic propaganda is another means of promoting the "Three Views" education movement. Through popular art such as essays, cartoons, dramas, and songs, the emotional resonance of the group is mobilized, thereby improving cohesion and arousing strong indignation of the group. In November 1950, the All-China Federation of Literary and Art Circles issued the "Call for Literary and Art Circles to Carry Out Anti-American and Aid-to-Korea Propaganda Work", calling on all branches of the Federation and local literary and art organizations to take action in unison to "expose the crimes of American imperialism" and "eliminate the influence of imperialist poison on some people" in the form of art. Literary and art publications and major newspapers in various parts of mainland China published thousands of literary and art works and guiding articles about the Korean War in large numbers of pages. According to statistics from Shanghai from November 3 to December 5, 1950, a month and two days, 890 literary and art works have been published and performed. Publishing houses across the country published a large number of literary and art series on the theme of the Korean War. From November 1950 to March 1951, dozens of related series were published in just four months.

=== Influence of Chinese Christianity ===
Catholicism and Protestantism have a profound influence in China. At that time, there were about 4 million believers. Among them, many Protestant groups had close ties with the United States and were funded and controlled by American churches. Their charitable and educational undertakings were extremely "deceptive" in order to carry out ideological education movements against the United States. How to deal with them became a key point of the "Three Views" education. Under the promotion of the CCP, in September 1950, Y. T. Wu and others from the Christian side issued the "The Christian Manifesto". In December, Y. T. Wu and others from the Catholic Church in Guangyuan, Sichuan, issued the "Declaration on the Self-Reliance and Reform Movement", calling on believers to cut off their ties with imperialist countries and implement "self-governance, self-support, and self-propagation" (the Three-Self Movement). After the outbreak of the Korean War, the focus of propaganda shifted to accusations against foreign missionaries and clergy engaged in espionage. Among them, the most influential were the accusations against the abuse of infants in the orphanages run by the church. One of them was the "bloodbath" at the Guangzhou Holy Infant Orphanage. The People’s Daily accused it of being a "killing ground" under the cover of " charitable work" and " religious work". Because the accusations against church orphanages had a good effect, many similar incidents were discovered throughout the country in 1951. A large number of crimes against orphanages were accused, and the steps of the accusations were basically the same. Accusations against them were more likely to arouse hatred, and this hatred naturally led to American imperialism and at the same time aroused patriotic enthusiasm. This is the most successful part of the "three views" education.

== Impact ==
The "Three Views" education movement reshaped the perception of the United States among the Chinese people. The image of the United States in the minds of many mainland Chinese people changed from a democratic, civilized and friendly country to a "reactionary and degenerate base camp of the whole world" during the Anti-Japanese War.

First, the United States was perceived as the mortal enemy of the Chinese people, "a two-headed snake that started by robbing", " a bloodsucker of the Chinese people ". The "aggression" of the "US imperialists" was viewed as "hypocritical" and "an aggression that kills without bloodshed". Therefore, the United States was viewed as "the most dangerous enemy and the most vicious enemy of the Chinese people". Secondly, as the leader of the imperialist aggression camp, the United States was viewed as the "most reactionary, barbaric and aggressive imperialist country in the world", and the "nest of massacre of mankind". Therefore, it was seen as the "most vicious enemy of the peace-loving and democratic people of the world", and the "reactionary center of the world". Third, the United States was seen as the most corrupt imperialist country, a "country of spies, hooligans and robbers " The United States was seen as a "paradise for dogs", a "hell for people", and a "world of madmen". The American people live were perceived as being in poverty and are displaced, unwilling to fight. American scientific research was seen as heading towards its end.

The concepts formed by the "Three Views" education movement have subtly influenced the Chinese people. After the news of the Korean armistice negotiations reached Beijing on 1 July 1951, "many people were very dissatisfied with the media calling Ridgway "general" and "commander-in-chief of the United Nations forces", because according to the concepts accepted in the "Three Views" education, "Ridgway is a representative of American imperialism, so how can he be respectfully called a general?" News reports and speeches were full of "stimulating words" such as bandits, imperialism, demons, and fascism. In May 1952, Zhou Enlai instructed that "unnecessary stimulating statements should be avoided or used less". Until 1972, when the Chinese government announced Nixon's visit to China, the general public in China "could not accept it emotionally for a while". When they saw Mao Zedong "shaking hands and making peace" with "the head of American imperialism" Richard Nixon in the newspapers, they were generally shocked and dumbfounded.

The "Three Views" education movement successfully aroused and guided the public's hatred toward the United States through propaganda and education in the news media and by organizing various meetings and gatherings. The anti- American ideology centered on "anti-American" and " anti-Americanism " formed and influenced generations of people in mainland China afterward. This influence was also used by the leaders of the 1967 Hong Kong riots to incite participants to resist the rule of the British Hong Kong government.
