= Shijiazhuang Gospel Church =

Church in Shijiazhuang, Hebei, China

Shijiazhuang Gospel Church (simplified Chinese: 石家庄福音堂; traditional Chinese: 石家莊福音堂; pinyin: Shíjiāzhuāng Fúyīntáng), full name Shijiazhuang Christian Gospel Church, is located on Xinhua Road, Xinhua District, Shijiazhuang, the capital city of Hebei Province, China. Founded in 1921, the Gospel Church is the oldest existing Protestant church in the city. It is now directly affiliated with the Shijiazhuang branch of China Christian Council, pastoring tens of thousands of believers.

== History ==
In 1913, Pastor Peter Ran of the Assemblies of God of Denmark came to Shijiazhuang. He rented houses in Nandajie, Daqiaojie and Sihoujie to preach the gospel.

In 1921, Pastor Ran sold his property in Denmark, raised 30,000 US dollars, bought 7.5 acres of land on Xinhua Road in Shijiazhuang City, and built the "Gospel Church", which was big enough to accommodate 400 people.

In 1943, Pastor Ran died of illness in Beijing, and the church was handed over to the Chinese pastor Zhang Dianqin for management.

After the founding of the People's Republic of China, the Gospel Church was confiscated by the government in 1954, and then lent back to the church every Sunday for worship gatherings.

In June 1956, the first Christian Representative Conference of Shijiazhuang City was held in the Gospel Church. The conference passed the "Resolution on the Work Report of the Preparatory Meeting of the Municipal Christian Three-Self Patriotic Movement Committee". After that, the Gospel Church joined the Three-Self Church.

After the start of the Anti-Rightist Movement in 1958, the church was forced to stop gatherings.

In 1967, the church was converted into a two-story building and rented to the Municipal Public Security Bureau as a family dormitory.

In 1982, the government implemented the policy of religious freedom, returned the properties to the church, and compensated 75,000 yuan for repairs. The church was repaired and put into use in 1983.

In 1998, the church raised funds to build a new building behind the original church building, with a construction area of about 3,200 square meters and a capacity of 2,000 people. The new Gospel Church (building) was dedicated and put into use on December 20.

As of 2017, in addition to its own members, the Gospel Church also pastored tens of thousands of believers in more than 50 gathering points around Shijiazhuang.

== Architecture ==
The original building of the Gospel Church built in 1921 has basically remained in its original state: facing south, ridge-tile brick-wood structure, 9 meters wide and 20 meters long, and a main building area of 200 square meters. The front wall is 17 meters high, with a large spire holding a cross on the top and two symmetrical small spires on both sides. There is a white marble banner above the gate with the words "歸耶和華為聖" (Holy to the Lord, later changed to "都當讚美耶和華", Praise the Lord). On both sides are white marble vertical couplets: "盡心盡性盡力盡意" (With all your heart, soul, strength and mind) and "一主一信一洗一神" (One Lord, One Faith, One Baptism, One God). Behind the hall is a 13-meter-high bell tower, as well as more than 60 attached rooms such as the chapel, offices, basements, dormitories, etc., with a construction area of more than 1,000 square meters. At present, some daily worship and wedding activities are still held in the old Gospel Church.

The new Gospel Church, built in 1998, is located at No. 94 Xinhua Road, adjacent to the old Gospel Church, and also faces south. The building area is about 3,200 square meters. The building is 45.9 meters long, 21 meters wide, and 39.42 meters high (to the top of the cross). The main building has five floors (including the basement) and is a reinforced concrete frame structure that can accommodate 2,000 people. It integrates worship, office, reception, choir, bell tower, bicycle garage, etc. into one building. The total cost of the project is more than 3 million yuan.

== Activities ==
In addition to traditional worships, the Gospel Church also organizes activities such as epidemic donations, thanksgiving praise meetings and autumn outings. They also have good interaction with other churches, including the Catholic.
