= Yunnan Trinity International Church =

Church in Yunnan, China

Coordinates: 25°02′49″N 102°42′05″E

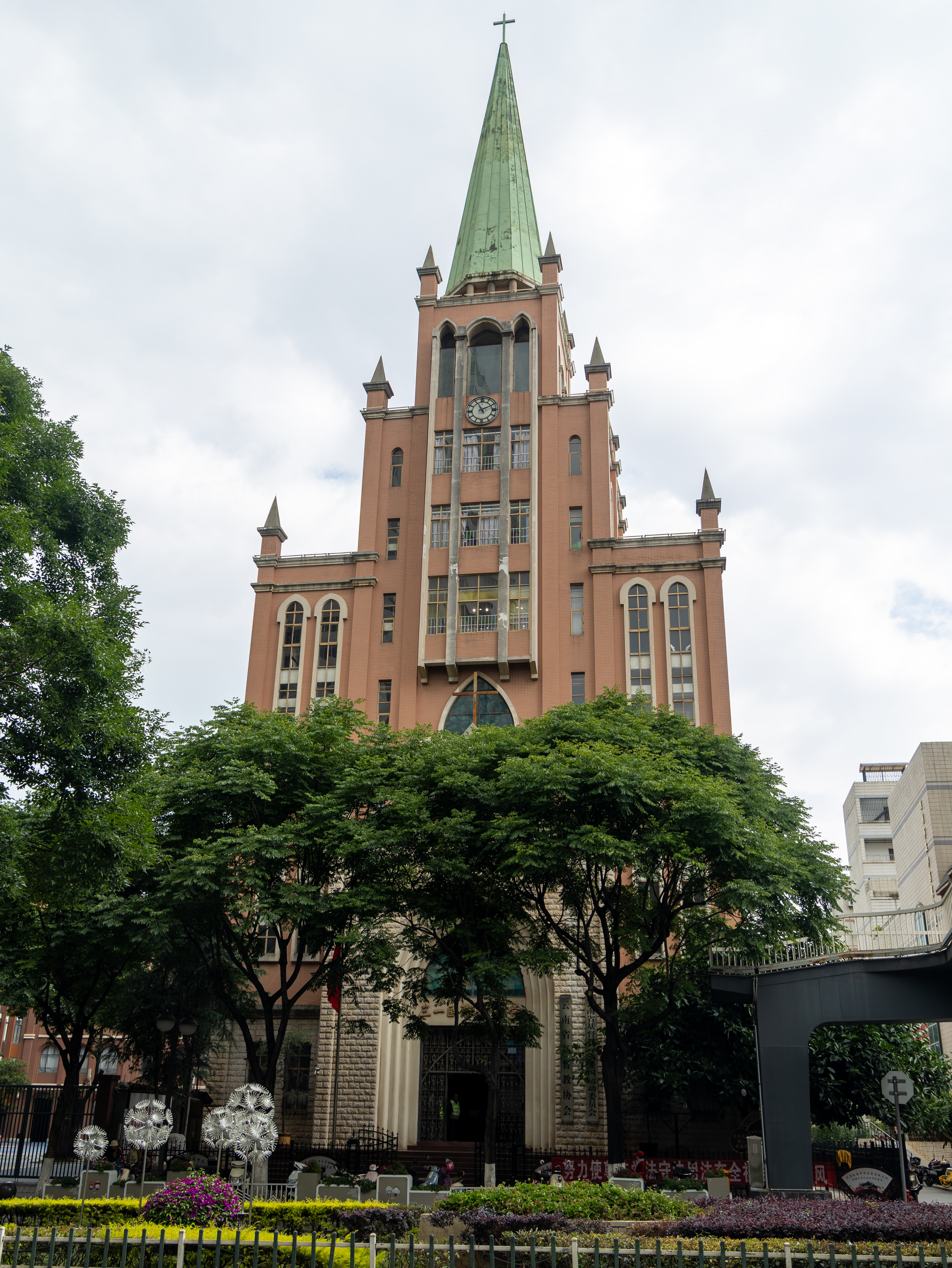
Yunnan Trinity International Church

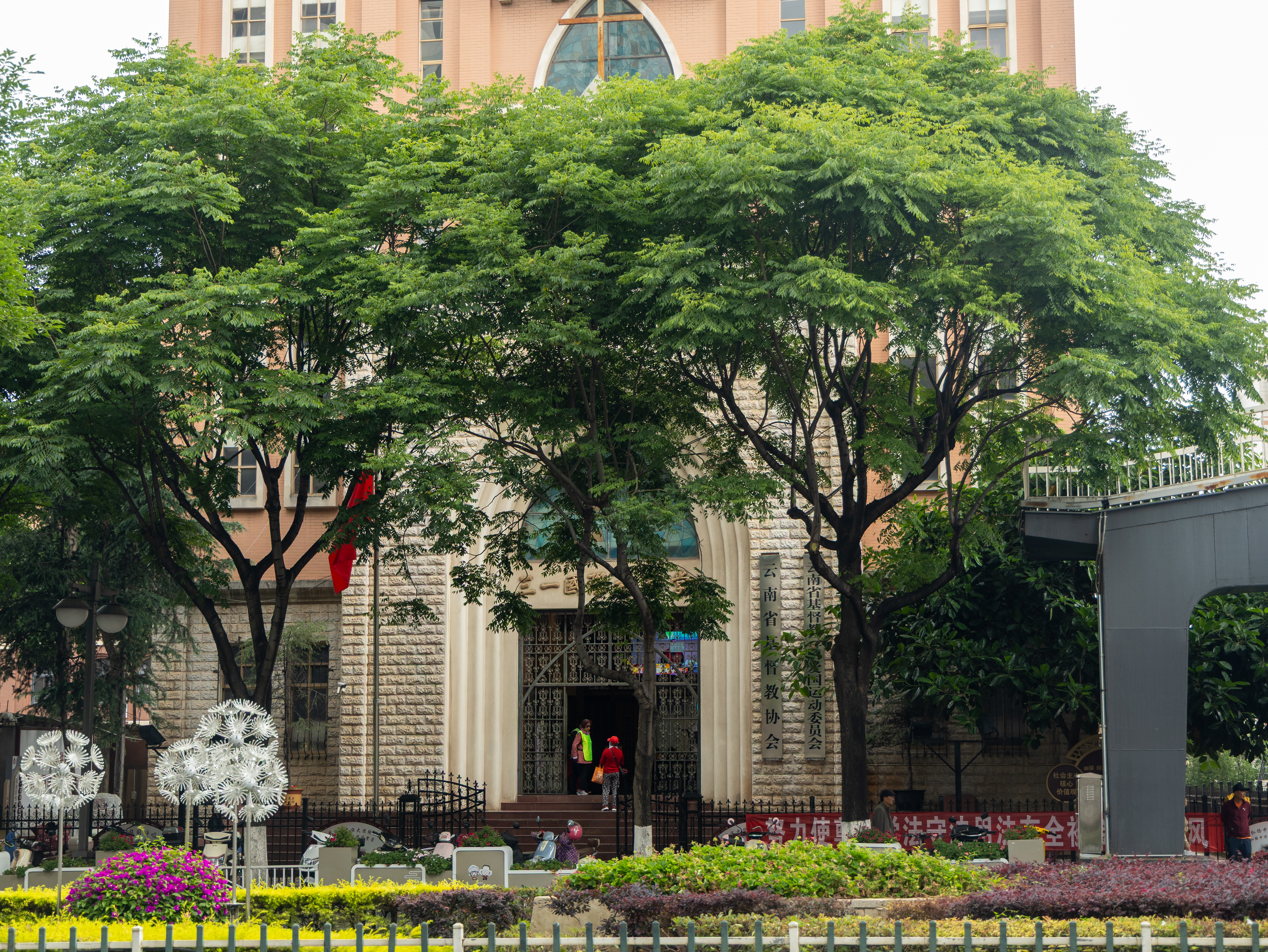
Entrance

The Yunnan Trinity International Church, normally called Trinity International Church (simplified Chinese: 三一国际礼拜堂; traditional Chinese: 三一國際禮拜堂; pinyin: Sānyī Guójì Lǐbàitáng), is the largest Christian church in Yunnan Province, China. It is the seat of the provincial offices of the China Christian Council and of the Three-Self Patriotic Movement.

The church was called Trinity Holy Church when founded in 1904, and was given with its present name when the new church building was built in 2004.

== History ==
In 1894, the China Inland Mission purchased a property in Zhonghe Lane, Wucheng Road, Kunming, the capital of Yunnan Province, and established a church there. In 1897, the missionaries were forced to leave the country. In 1901, Meccadi, the Yunnan District Supervisor of the China Inland Mission, returned to Kunming. In 1903, he used 9,500 taels of indemnity to rebuild the destroyed church in Zhonghe Lane, Wucheng Road. It was completed in 1904 with a construction area of 850 square meters, which can accommodate four or five hundred people.

In 1963, the Yunnan Provincial Christian Three-Self Patriotic Movement Committee was established and located in Trinity Church. Since then, the church has also been the headquarter of the Yunnan branch of the China Christian Council.

During the Cultural Revolution, the church was closed. In December 1984, the Trinity Church resumed worship. In February 1997, the Trinity Church was demolished due to road widening. For eight years after the demolition, believers rented a cinema for worship. On June 22, 2003, the new church held a groundbreaking ceremony, and on December 12, 2004, a thanksgiving service was held to celebrate the opening of the church. It was renamed "Trinity International Church".

== Building ==
Trinity International Church is the largest church in Yunnan province. It is a Gothic-style building with a construction area of 4,018 square meters. The new church is located on the 1st to 3rd floors of the church complex with a construction area of 2,000 square meters. The 4th to 7th floors are the provincial ministry centers of the China Christian Council and of the Three-Self Patriotic Movement.

== Services ==
The church has five worship services on Sundays. More than 7000 believers come to attend the congregation. The church has more than 20 fellowshops, 3 of which are for the people with disabilities. 150 disabled believers have found love and dignity here.

In addition, there are three baptism services per year, each with 200-300 people baptized.

== Bible Translation for Ethnic Minorities ==
The Trinity Church has also made great contribution to produce the translated versions of the Bible in the languages of national minorities in Yunan, including Miao, Eastern Lisu, Western Lisu, Wa and Black Yi, as well as the translated New Testament in the White Yi language.

== Beichen Church ==
Kunminng Beichen Church, a campus of Kunming Trinity International Church, was dedicated on August 20, 2016. The new church has a main chapel and a side chapel that can accommodate 2500 to 3000 believers, with the total construction area of 12,000 square meters. It also has a bell tower.

== See also ==
- Bible translations into the languages of China
