= Jiaochangjie Church =

Church in Qinghai Province, China

Jiaochangjie Church, or Jiaochang Street Church (simplified Chinese: 教场街教堂; traditional Chinese: 教場街教堂; pinyin: Jiàochǎngjiē Jiàotáng; lit. 'teaching-field street church'), full name Xining Jiaochangjie Christian Church, is located in the central area of Xining, capital city of Qinghai Province, China. It covers an area of 4,329 square meters, and is the largest and oldest Protestant church in Qinghai.

== History ==
In 1878, two pastors from the China Inland Mission preached in northwest China and established the Main Gospel House in Xining, Qinghai.

In 1891, British pastor H. F. Ridley (Chinese: 胡立礼) and his wife came to Xining to preach. They purchased their rented house with more than 1,000 taels of silver and converted it into a gospel house. In 1904, the first church in Qinghai, i.e., Xining Jiaochangjie Church, was built, which is now the largest church in the region.

After 1915, more pastors came from the United States, Britain, Canada and other places to preach, and established hospitals and schools in various parts of Qinghai.

Around 1949, when the People's Republic of China was founded, some foreign missionaries left early and some were expelled.

Later, the Christian "Three-Self Patriotic Movement" was launched in Qinghai. From 1954 to 1958, some Chinese pastors were arrested and imprisoned, and churches were closed.

In 1978, China began to reform and open up and restore religious freedom. Qinghai's Christian evangelism developed rapidly.

In 1981, worship activities were resumed at Jiaochangjie Church.

In 1984, 1991 and 1994 respectively, the church was renovated and expanded three times.

In 2014, the Jiaochang Street Church built a new church, called the "Gospel Church" (Chinese: 福音堂). The dedication ceremony was held in July 2015.

== Social services ==
The church's social service work includes poverty alleviation, disaster relief and student aid. The church members prayed earnestly for these acts of kindness and put them into practice. For example: In terms of poverty alleviation, donation activities have been held. In terms of disaster relief, they have donated 57,00 yuan to the Indian Ocean earthquake and tsunami-stricken areas, 30,673 yuan to the Wenchuan earthquake-stricken area, and 33,568 yuan to the Yushu earthquake-stricken area, and visited the hospital to express condolences to the injured. In terms of student aid, donations have been made to the No. 13 Middle School in Xining City, the No. 1 Hui Primary School in Hualong Hui Autonomous County, and Kunlun Middle School. The church also successfully held literacy classes on its own. In addition, the church also donated 2,000 yuan to the Xining School for the Deaf and mute and donated wheelchairs to the disabled. There are also church members who personally volunteered at the welfare home.

== Religious activities ==
Jiaochangjie Church holds three services on Sunday, with nearly 3,000 people attending. The two services in the morning are mainly for Chinese people, and the one in the afternoon is an international service for foreigners. In addition, there are spiritual meetings, sisterhoods and youth gatherings.

The church address is: No. 14, Jiaochang Street, Xining City; phone number 0971-8239918.
