= Sunzhuang Church =

Church in Henan Province, China

Sunzhuang Church was a church which was located in the Henan province in the People's Republic of China. The Sunzhuang Church was a church which was destroyed on June 12, 2020, when more than 200 Chinese Communist Party officials from different departments including the Zhengzhou High-Tech District's Ethnic and Religious Affairs Bureau brought cranes and heavy-duty machinery to the area.

The church congregation had been part of China's network of government-run churches since the 1990s. The Sunzhuang Church joined the Three-Self Patriotic Movement in June 2012, when the communist government allowed the church to be built.

However, in 2013 the Sunzhuang Village Committee issued a demolition notice, citing a failure to follow procedures for building the church. Church officials responded by presenting authorities with a certificate showing that they obtained prior government approval for church construction. On July 24, 2013, and August 3, 2013, the doorway of the church was filled with tons of dirt, rocks, and rubble. As demolition efforts began in 2013, government officials increased tension by cutting off the church's electricity and water supply. The Chinese Communist crackdown on Christianity had paused in 2020 due to the 2019-2020 coronavirus pandemic.
