= Ningbo Centennial Church =

Church in Ningbo, China

Ningbo Centennial Church, or Ningbo Centenary Church (simplified Chinese: 宁波百年堂; traditional Chinese: 寧波百年堂; pinyin: Níngbō Bǎiniántáng), was founded by the Anglican Church to commemorate the 100th anniversary of its Christian mission in Ningbo City, Zhejiang Province. It was also the first Christian church to be reopened after the Cultural Revolution in mainland China. And currently the church is the central church of the city and the seat of the municipal office of the China Christian Council.

== History ==
In 1848, the Anglican Christian Missionary Society sent William Russell and Cobald to Ningbo to preach, based on which they founded the Zhejiang Diocese. Meanwhiles many schools and hospitals were also built.

In May 1948, the Yincheng Pastoral District of the Zhejiang Diocese of the Anglican Church of China started to build a new church in Daliang Street, Ningbo. The church was named "Centennial Church" to commemorate the 100th anniversary of the Anglican Church's Christian mission in Ningbo. The construction work was completed in 1950.

During the "Great Leap Forward" in 1958, Christians implemented joint worship services, and the Centennial Church was preserved. By 1965, other churches in Ningbo had closed, and Centennial Church became the only open church in the city.

The Cultural Revolution began in Mainland China on July 9, 1966. And Christianity, as the "Four Olds," was banned, the Church was closed, Bibles were burned and pastoral staff were labeled as monsters and demons.

After the Cultural Revolution, the government corrected its extreme left line. On April 8, 1979, Ningbo Centennial Church became the first Christian church to be reopened in mainland China.

In the 1990s, a large number of high-rise buildings were built in the central area of Ningbo around the Centennial Church, which damaged the foundation of the church. Therefore, the Centennial Church was demolished and rebuilt, making it a larger and taller Gothic-style building of 4 floors, with more office and ancillary rooms. A thanksgiving service was held on June 26, 1996.

Centennial Church is currently the central church of Ningbo City and the seat of the municipal office of the China Christian Council.

== Social activities ==
In addition to the traditional worship and other religious activities, the church had opened nursing homes and been active in blood donation and visitation ministry since its reopening in 1979.
