= Lianghui (Protestantism) =

Term referring to the two Chinese government-sanctioned Protestant organizations

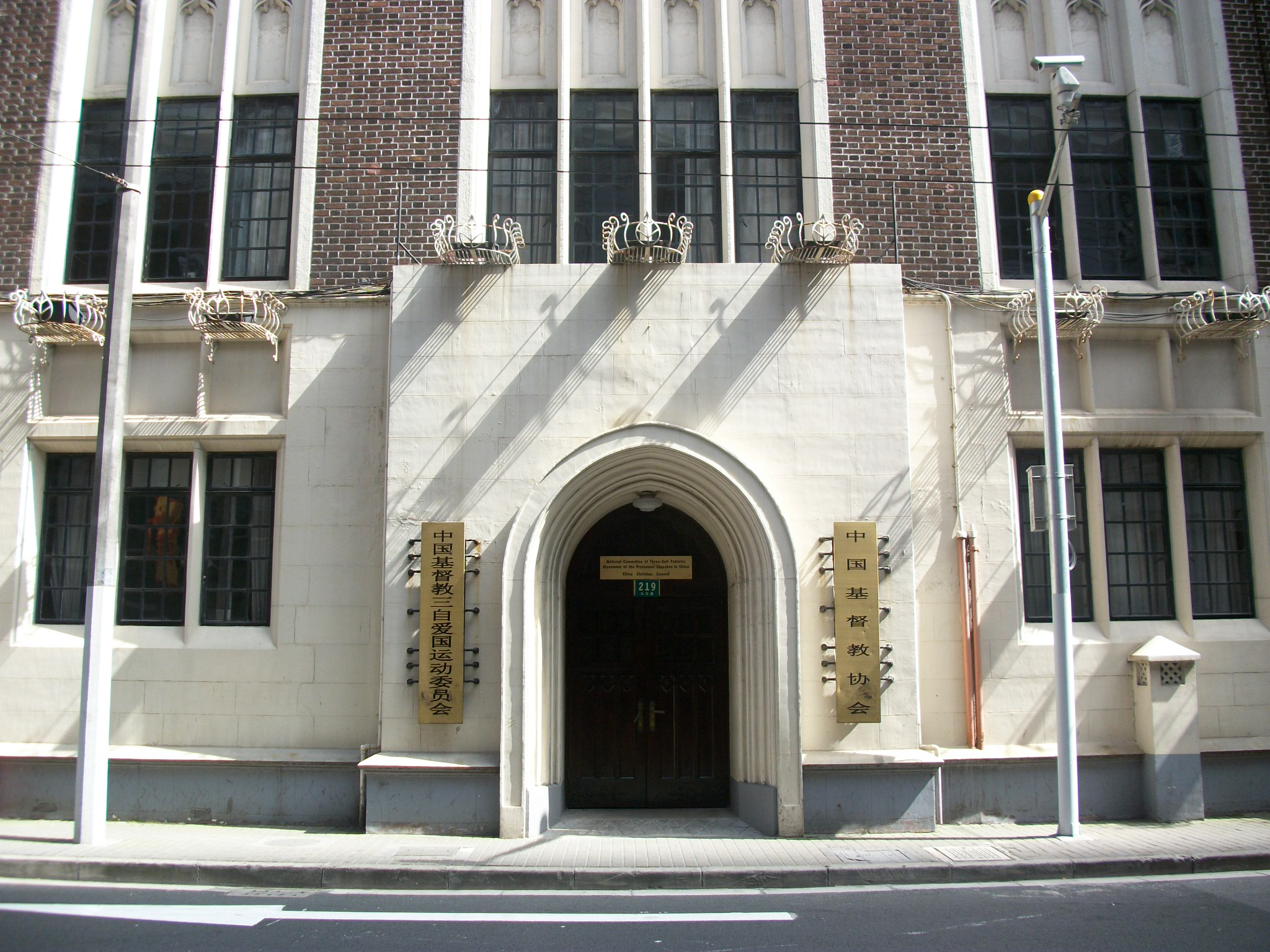
The Protestant "National Lianghui" office in Shanghai.

Protestantism in China uses lianghui (simplified Chinese: 两会; traditional Chinese: 兩會; pinyin: Liǎnghuì; Wade–Giles: Liang^{3} Hui^{4}; lit. 'two meetings') to speak of the two Chinese government-sanctioned Protestant organizations: the Three-Self Patriotic Movement (TSPM) and the China Christian Council (CCC). Due to the close relationship between these two organizations, they are sometimes mistaken as the same organization.

== Administrative structure ==
Beginning in the 1980s, both associations were simultaneously headed by K. H. Ting (丁光訓, 1915–2012), an ordained Anglican Bishop of Zhejiang in 1955 (prior to the absorption of all Anglican and other Protestant denominational churches into the TSPM). He would retire from both positions at the 6th National Christian Conference, where he addressed the delegates on 29 December 1996.

The TSPM and CCC together form the constituent organizations of the National Conference of Chinese Protestant Churches. The distinctive roles of the TSPM and CCC are hard to distinguish due to overlaps but both organizations maintain separate Standing Committees.

The administrative structure of the lianghui is diagrammed as follows:

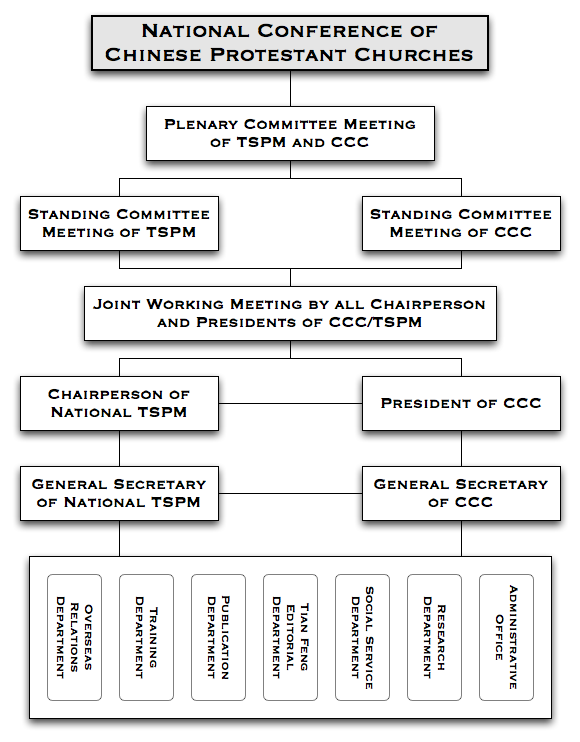

== Ministries ==
The TSPM and CCC jointly administer the following ministries:

- Social Service Ministry

Organizes resources both domestic and abroad, to plan and coordinate the activities of local churches to promote an active social welfare programs, disaster relief programs, and emergency relief work.

- Publication Ministry

Coordinates the editing, publication and distribution of books, audio and video materials, Bibles and hymnals. Also sets guidelines for the publication of materials by local TSPM committees and Church councils.

- Ministry of Reconstruction of Theological Thinking

Researches main trends of Churches overseas, major themes involved in Reconstruction of Theological Thinking, and issues concerning church development in China.

- Education and Training Ministry

Supervises and coordinates issues relating to educational guidelines for Theological Seminaries and Bible Colleges in China, organizes overseas study program for theological graduates, supports lay training programs, and organizes training programs in specialized fields.

- Overseas Relations Ministry

Supervised and coordinates the establishment and development of relationships between Chinese churches and overseas churches through regular mutual visits and exchanges on the basis of mutual respect, and equality.

== Number of Christians ==
There are large numbers of Chinese house churches in China which are outside of the registered organizations.

Together, the TSPM and CCC claims a total of between 9.8 million to 13.5 million Protestant Christians in China.

== Controversy ==
The TSPM and CCC are viewed with suspicion and distrust by some Christians both within and outside China. Some claim the TSPM to be a tool of the Chinese Communist Party to control and regulate the expression of Christianity. As a result, many groups refuse to deal with the TSPM or CCC and there exists a large unregistered House Church movement in China with some claiming that it serves the large majority of Protestant Christians in China.

There are allegations of regular and systematic persecution against Christians associated with the House Church movement and other unregistered Christian organizations in China.

== Catholicism ==
Roman Catholicism in China uses lianghui, or yihuiyituan (一会一团 or "one association and one conference"), referring to the Chinese Patriotic Catholic Association (中国天主教爱国会) and the Bishops Conference of Catholic Church in China (中国天主教主教团). These two state-approved Catholic organizations do not accept the primacy of the Roman Pontiff, in contrast to the Chinese Catholic Bishops Conference (天主教台灣地區主教團) in Taiwan.

== See also ==
- Three-Self Patriotic Movement (TSPM)
- China Christian Council (CCC)
- Tian Feng - the official magazine of CCC/TSPM
- Antireligious campaigns of the Chinese Communist Party
