= Marcus Cheng =

Chinese Protestant evangelical leader

Chen Chonggui
- 陳崇桂
- Born: 1884; Hubei
- Died: 8 March 1963 (aged 78–79)
- Other names: Marcus Cheng
- Education: Wheaton College

Marcus Cheng (simplified Chinese: 陈崇桂; traditional Chinese: 陳崇桂; pinyin: Chen Chonggui; 1884 – 8 March 1963), was a leading Chinese Protestant evangelical leader. Cheng became a prominent evangelical leader and Chinese nationalist and gained international attention in the 1920s. After the establishment of the People's Republic of China in 1949, Cheng joined other Protestant leaders to form the Three-Self Patriotic Movement, which promised independence of foreign financing and control in return for religious autonomy. He became disillusioned and openly criticized the government's policies on religion in 1957. Although he was not arrested, he was severely criticized and died in obscurity in 1963.

== Early life ==
Cheng was the second child of a poor barrel and cask maker, born near the prosperous mid-Yangtze valley city of Wuchang, Hubei. His father had briefly attended a mission school and joined the Congregational church. When Cheng was six years old, his father and uncle opened a lumberyard which was successful enough that Cheng was able to attend a primary school run by charity. He still often had to leave school to help in the family business. At age 16, Cheng entered the Wesley College (Powen Middle School) in Wuchang, where he was among the first Chinese to study with the Mission Covenant Church of Sweden.

After graduation, Cheng took a job in a local business in order to support his parents, but his new marriage, apparently a happy one, ended after only six months in 1906 with the death of his wife. Her death brought on what he later called "the greatest crisis in my life". Believing that he had been called to a mission in education, he left his career in business to work full-time in the Covenant Mission school. In 1907, the Covenant mission sent him to Sweden to raise money for a seminary in China, a project that drew support also from the American-supported Covenant mission in North China and the Swedish-financed on in south China. The first book he published, Eko från Kina (Stockholm, 1921), was written in Swedish, which he translated into English as Echoes from China (Chicago, 1921).

Returning from Sweden by way of the United States, he visited the American headquarters of the Covenant church in Chicago. While there, he enrolled as an undergraduate at Wheaton College, an evangelical institution, where he applied credits from China and worked straight through in order to graduate in one year, at the age of thirty-eight.

C.K. Lee, Leland Wang and Marcus Cheng. Photo from the archive of Mission Covenant Church of Sweden.

== Faith and nationalism, 1921-1949 ==
Upon his return, Cheng joined what historian Daniel Bays calls the "Sino-Foreign Protestant Establishment," which included such figures as Zhao Zichen, David Z. T. Yui, and Frank Rawlinson, whose theology was more liberal than Cheng's fundamentalism. Following the May Thirtieth Incident of 1925, in which British-led troops killed unarmed student demonstrators in Shanghai, Cheng was forced to resign from his teaching post. For the next two years, he served as a chaplain in the army of Feng Yuxiang, known as "the Christian General". When Feng aligned with the revolutionary Nationalist Party of Chiang Kai-shek, Cheng resigned from the chaplaincy. The Covenant Church of Sweden in 1928 invited him to visit in order to demonstrate their success in attracting charismatic Chinese. En route, he participated in the International Missionary Council Conference in Jerusalem, a convocation that did much to advance the cause of ecumenical Christianity outside Europe and North America.

On his return once again to China, Cheng taught Bible and theology at the Hunan Bible Institute in Changsha, Hunan, where he remained from 1929 to 1937, while editing the journal Evangelism and conducting widely attended speaking tours that made him nationally prominent. In 1935, however, Cheng and other faculty expected that the new president of the Institute would be Chinese, as would have been required by Chinese law if the school had been secular. They wrote to the Board of the Institute in Los Angeles to explain their reasoning. When the appointment of a non-Chinese who was unpopular with staff and students was nonetheless carried out, Cheng gradually withdrew and left the Institute in 1937.

After the outbreak of the Second Sino-Japanese War in August 1937, Cheng offered to re-join his original home, the Covenant Mission group in Central China in spite of his longstanding reluctance to work in foreign-dominated organizations. The Mission Board in California accepted this offer, but the leaders in China rejected it, perhaps because they felt that he would operate autonomously. Cheng then became an evangelist with the China Inland Mission in Sichuan. He visited Singapore in 1941, where the Japanese invasion delayed his return for two years. On his return to Chongqing in 1943, the Mission supported him in establishing the Chungking Theological Seminary, which became his base. He served as its president until 1953, presiding over a faculty of both Chinese and foreign members.

During the war years, the Chinese Communists presented a program of patriotic resistance and promotion of social justice. Progressive Christians such as Wu Yaozong of the YMCA and even some relatively conservative evangelicals such as Cheng became sympathetic to their promise to serve and uplift the poor. In 1950, one of his China Inland Mission associates reported that Cheng had "gone for the new regime hook, line, and sinker".

== Religion and revolution after 1949 ==
After the establishment of the People's Republic of China in 1949, Cheng and such Protestant leaders as Wu Yaozong and Cora Deng organized the Three-Self Patriotic Movement, a government-sponsored group that promoted Christianity independent of foreign money and foreign leadership. He was a member of the Sino-Soviet Friendship Association and the People's Alliance.

When the "Hundred Flowers" movement of 1957 encouraged criticism of the Party and the government, Cheng spoke out against corruption. Citing the doctrine "Love Country--Love-Church", Cheng and Wu Yaozong called for the government to follow the policies of religious freedom in Article 88 of the Constitution. They politely but firmly criticized officials who saw spiritual belief as a "defect" and who carried out campaigns to attack religion. The Three-Self Movement then adopted a leftist program. Cheng was one of seven church leaders to come under their intense criticism, and was severely criticized until his death. His funeral in March 1963, however, was conducted by Wu Yaozong.

== Family life ==
Cheng's son, Chen Renbing (1909- 1990) was an American-educated sociologist.

== Works ==
- Eko från Kina (Stockholm, 1921), English translation, Echoes from China, (Chicago, 1921).
- Vad händer i Kina? (中国发生了什么?),(Stockholm, )
- 灵修日新，長沙，湖南聖經學校，1930。
- 大題小做，漢口，中華信義會，1934。
- 聖靈之研究，長沙，湖南聖經學校，1933。
- 個人佈道的研究，上海，中華全國基督教協進會，1933。
- 基督化家庭，漢口，中國基督聖教書會，1936。
- 佈道六講，上海，廣學會，1954年。
- 实践的基督教，上海，廣學會，1954年。
- 圣经总论，重慶，佈道雜誌社，1947年。
- 培靈十講，上海，廣學會，1954.
