= The Christian Manifesto =

1950 political manifesto of Chinese Protestants

- "The Christian Manifesto" on the front page of the People's Daily on 23 September 1950
- Created: May 1950
- Presented: 28 July 1950
- Commissioned by: Zhou Enlai
- Author(s): Y. T. Wu and others
- Signatories: 417,389
- Subject: Christianity in China, anti-imperialism
- Purpose: Instill pro-government tendency among Chinese Christians

"Direction of Endeavor for Chinese Christianity in the Construction of New China"
- Traditional Chinese: 中國基督教在新中國建設中努力的途徑
- Simplified Chinese: 中国基督教在新中国建设中努力的途径
Transcriptions
Standard Mandarin
- Hanyu Pinyin: Zhōngguó Jīdūjiào zài xīn Zhōngguó jiànshè zhōng nǔlì de tújìng

"The Christian Manifesto"
- Chinese: 基督教宣言
Transcriptions
Standard Mandarin
- Hanyu Pinyin: Jīdūjiào xuānyán

"The Three-Self Manifesto"
- Chinese: 三自宣言
Transcriptions
Standard Mandarin
- Hanyu Pinyin: Sānzì xuānyán

"Direction of Endeavor for Chinese Christianity in the Construction of New China", commonly known as "The Christian Manifesto" or "The Three-Self Manifesto", was a political manifesto of Protestants in China whereby they backed the newly founded People's Republic of China (PRC) and its Chinese Communist Party (CCP) leadership. Published in 1950, the manifesto paved the way for the government-controlled Three-Self Patriotic Movement (TSPM) of Protestants. This movement proclaimed the three principles of self-government, self-support, and self-propagation. The drafting and content of the manifesto was, and remains, controversial to this day.

The manifesto was devised after Protestant leaders presented their concerns with religious freedom to Zhou Enlai, the Premier of China. Instead of receiving their report, Zhou demanded them to come up with a statement in support of the new CCP leadership. Y. T. Wu and other leftist clergymen espoused the task and presented a draft manifesto that, after some opposition and changes, became a foundational text of Christianity in the new People's Republic. It condemns missionary activities in China as a form of imperialism, pledges loyalty to the CCP leadership, and encourages the Church to take up an indigenous Chinese stance toward Christianity.

Published on the front page of the People's Daily, the manifesto was accompanied by a campaign to gather signatures. Many Christian leaders and laymen signed, while others refused to do so. After the Korean War broke out, the campaign became an increasingly politicized test of loyalty that became merged with the Campaign to Suppress Counterrevolutionaries.

Some view the manifesto as a betrayal of the Church, while others find sympathy for the position of Chinese Christians struggling to reconcile their faith with the changed political situations. The manifesto ended missionary activities in China and the separation of Church and state. It led to the founding the TSPM and brought persecution to dissidents.

== Background ==
After the declaration of the People's Republic of China (PRC) in 1949, religious life in mainland China was forced to adapt itself in relation to the new rulers. Of all religions in China, Christianity was particularly susceptible to such pressure, because its inherently foreign character made the government think of it as a political threat. The Chinese Communist Party (CCP) was compelled to draw up a plan to persecute Christians whose religion it viewed as an ideological competitor of Marxism, or at least, to make the Christian population politically accountable. At the same time, the Common Program adopted by the Chinese People's Political Consultative Conference in 1949, the de facto interim constitution of the PRC, guaranteed freedom of religion. Chinese Protestants dispatched envoys all over China to see how this provision was being met in practice. Upon their return, they planned to write a report about the situation and present it to the Chinese government.

The Chinese Church faced four problems in the changed reality: it was dependent on foreign funding, its confession was fundamentally at odds with the communist ideology, it was wary of how local CCP cadres would implement religious policy of the new government, and finally, the Church was uneasy with China's foreign policy of friendly ties with the Soviet Union. In order to exert control, the government supported those Christian groups that were willing to accommodate. One such group were Chinese Protestants who were based in Shanghai, headed by Y. T. Wu, the secretary of YMCA in China. Wu had envisioned transforming the Chinese Church even before 1949: he developed ideas ranging from advocating the Social Gospel to Christian socialism and communism. The government's political goals thus coincided with his. The core ideas of "The Christian Manifesto" had already been presented by Wu in a 1948 article "The Present-Day Tragedy of Christianity". Similarly, in December 1949 Wu's associates published an open letter "Message from Chinese Christians to Mission Boards Abroad" that declared foreign missionary activities unwelcome in China and called for their legacy to be critically reassessed.

Wu and his associates would implement the government's desires by publishing a document outlining Chinese Christianity in the new era.

By late summer of 1950, "The Christian Manifesto" had become part of a campaign to establish the Three-Self Patriotic Movement (TSPM) to replace its more outward-oriented predecessor, the National Christian Council of China (NCC). The TSPM would not be a church, but a government-sponsored parachurch organization directly controlled by the Religious Affairs Division (RAD, later the State Administration for Religious Affairs), which in turn was under the United Front Work Department of the CCP. The role of the TSPM was, and still is, to ensure that Protestant churches approved by officials operate according to the government's religious policy.

== History ==
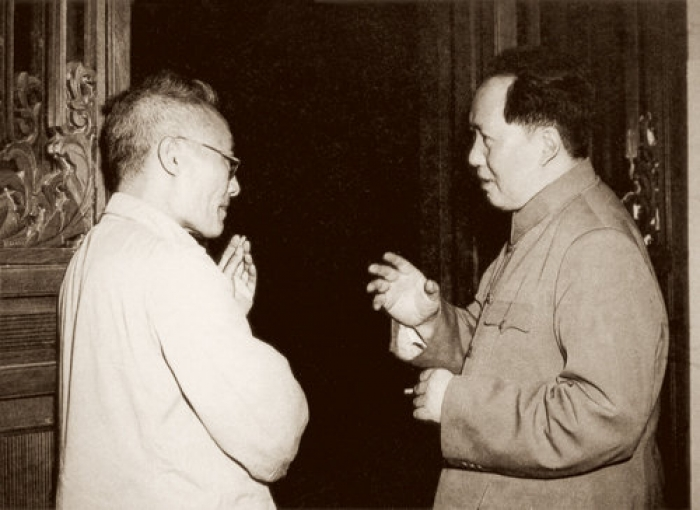
Y. T. Wu (left) having a conversation with Mao Zedong in June 1950, between the approval and publication of "The Christian Manifesto"

Y. T. Wu and other Shanghai churchmen were joined by Protestants from the northern regions of China to hold talks with Premier Zhou Enlai in May 1950. Some of the other Christian leaders included in the 19-strong delegation were Deng Yuzhi, T. C. Chao, and Jiang Changchuan. Three such meetings were arranged, on the 2nd, 6th, and 13th, each lasting several hours. On the agenda were, most likely, all four problems of the Church: reliance on foreign funding, irreconcilability of faith and the communist ideology, suspicion towards local CCP cadres, and resistance to China's friendly ties with the Soviet Union. It was, however, the local CCP cadres that were the Church leaders' main concern and the reason they had requested audience with Zhou.

The churchmen had prepared a letter to Zhou explaining the adversities faced by the Church and likely hoped to get assurances of protection from him. Zhou, however, "turned the tables on them", insisting that they came up with a new document that supported the government instead. The delegation was forced to cancel its future appointments in the provinces and start working on the manifesto. At the final meeting, a first draft manifesto was presented by Wu and approved by the government. The manifesto had been largely composed by Wu. It is possible that Wu and Zhou had privately agreed on writing the manifesto beforehand. Wu was in contact with Zhou throughout drafting, but accusations at home and abroad that Zhou had personally penned the manifesto have proven unsubstantiated. Some attributed the work to Chen Xingui of the China Democratic League whose writings were very similar in content. Among the Protestant parties concerned, attitudes to the situation varied widely and so writing the manifesto had been "as painstaking as it was controversial". Churches in China protested the draft, and Wu was forced to make some changes, although he refused other suggestions on the grounds of time constraints. The draft ultimately went through several revisions, some of which were discussed with the leaders of the CCP in Beijing. Some members of the clergy were left discontent and they withdrew from the movement led by Wu. The manifesto was issued on 28 July. Later, on 23 September, it was published on the front page of the People's Daily; with editorials and signatures the release spanned three pages. Wide circulation followed. Over the subsequent days, the Christian magazine Tian Feng and other newspapers, particularly in Shanghai, published it as well. It was the publication in the newspaper of the CCP that made it an authoritative statement, however. Both the Chinese Church and foreign missionaries were left out of the process from that point on. The publication was accompanied by a campaign among Protestants to collect signatures in support of it.

=== Signatures ===
The document's 40 original signatories were all Church leaders, including T. C. Chao, Jiang Changchuan, Qi Qincai, Wu Gaozi, Zhao Fusan, and Wang Zizhong. The initial publication in the People's Daily was accompanied by 1,527 signatures from Christian leaders. These names included Han Wenzao, Yu Zhihai, Zhu Guishen, and Sun Yanli.

Tian Feng closely followed the success of the manifesto and the number of its signatories. By the end of August, more than 1,500 had signed, 3,000 by September and 20,000 by November. January 1951 saw the figure go up to 90,000 and April 180,000. The campaign ultimately reached 417,389 claimed signatories before the circulation was over, in 1954, amounting to about half of all Chinese Protestants. More than one million additional signatures were gathered after the official circulation had been concluded. The high number of signatures has since been disputed by journalist David Aikman and others. For instance, more Lutherans purportedly signed the document than were in existence in China. It has also been claimed that many names were included without consent. Regardless, the number of signatories can be interpreted in two ways: a relatively high number of signatories testifies to the success of Wu and the campaign to accommodate to the communist government. Conversely, the number of people who did not sign the manifesto count as people who did not want the Chinese Church to sever its links with foreigners. It was feared that the NCC, which had facilitated cooperation between Chinese Protestants and foreign missionaries since 1922, would lose its independence. Most appear to have signed the document out of patriotic sentiments, not because of fundamental agreement with the actual provisions of the manifesto: not all were convinced Marxists. It is also possible that becoming a signatory was initially on a voluntary basis, but after the Korean War had broken out, doing so certainly became a test of loyalty that could not be avoided. The war resulted in the campaign rising to an unforeseen level of political urgency, and by early 1951 it had become mingled with the Campaign to Suppress Counterrevolutionaries. Similar intensification affected other government-led campaigns as well. After China's entry into the war, leaders of independent Chinese churches who refused to sign the manifesto began to be persecuted: they lost their churches, pastors were arrested, congregations forced underground, and dissidents were dragged to "denunciation meetings" that sometimes could result in imprisonment or execution. Though only a small number of Christians ended up being indicted or executed, the meetings were very humiliating for the dissidents.

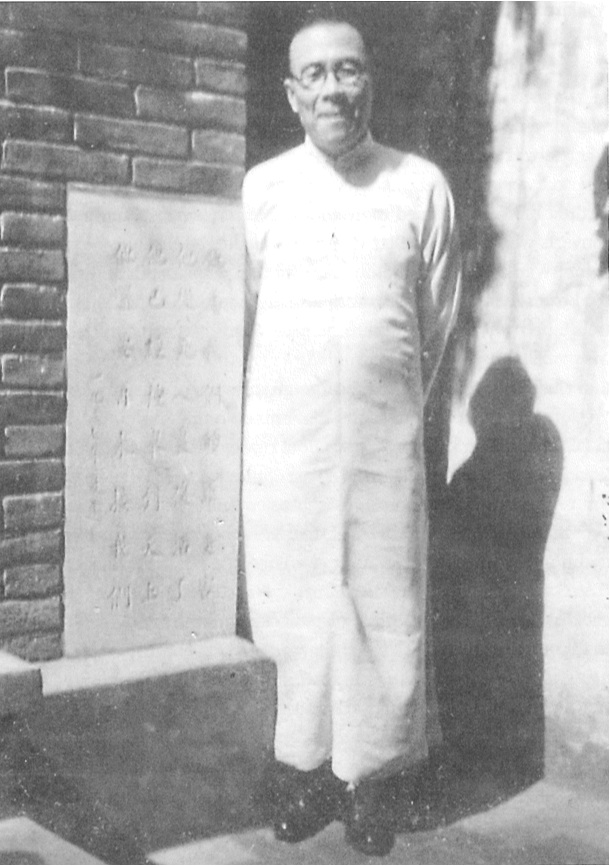
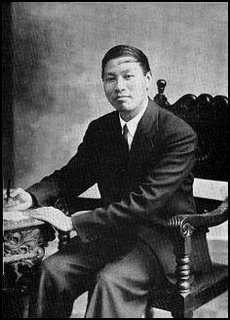
Wang Ming-Dao refused, unlike Watchman Nee who signed the manifesto.

Some notable Protestant ministers, such as K. H. Ting, did not sign the document. In Ting's case, the reason remains unclear. He stated that he supported the document but said, nonetheless: "it just happened that I haven't signed it". It could have been that the reason was that he was abroad at the time of the manifesto's circulation. He could have, like many did, sign it after official circulation, but never did. This casts some doubt on his stated rationale. Wang Ming-Dao outright refused to sign "The Christian Manifesto". This, and his deliberate failure to register his church with the RAD, led to his imprisonment for 23 years and ensured his worldwide fame. Robin Chen, too, refused to sign, although he took part in the activities of the TSPM later. Notably, Watchman Nee did sign, as did many members of his Little Flock church. Nee was able to gather as much as 34,983 signatures in total, though most of them had been for a petition against the nationalization of Little Flock property; Nee simply included them in "The Christian Manifesto" as well. The move proved to be controversial. Joseph Tse-Hei Lee thinks that Nee complied with the wishes of the campaign, but Tang Shoulin, an associate of Nee, has said that he was just trying to appear cooperative on the surface but, in reality, sabotaged the campaign. The share of signatures gathered by Nee was 17% of total signatures of the manifesto at the time. Of earlier signatories of the manifesto, the largest segment had been members of the indigenous Jesus Family church.

The NCC, which was the highest Protestant authority in the country, also signed the manifesto. After years of inactivity, the organization convened a meeting in October 1950. The meeting was initially scheduled for August, but proponents of "The Christian Manifesto" were able to postpone it in order to further the success of the manifesto. The preparatory committee of the meeting tried to fend off attempts to have the manifesto endorsed at the meeting, and even planned to write a counter-manifesto. Its efforts failed, and even though the TSPM was not even on the agenda of the meeting, it ended up unanimously supporting the manifesto and the TSPM, effectively terminating its own organization. It was the first meeting in history where all Chinese Protestants were represented, and so its signing of the manifesto was of special importance. From that point on the road was open for both the inception of the TSPM and the success of the manifesto. For China author Richard C. Bush, it was this moment rather than the initial publication that marked the manifesto's transforming of Chinese Christianity.

== Content ==
Opening lines of "The Christian Manifesto"

Protestant Christianity has been introduced to China for more than a hundred and forty years. During this period it has made a not unworthy contribution to Chinese society. Nevertheless, and this was most unfortunate, not long after Christianity's coming to China, imperialism started its activities here; and since the principal groups of missionaries who brought Christianity to China all came themselves from these imperialistic countries, Christianity consciously or unconsciously, directly or indirectly, became related with imperialism.

The manifesto is short, less than 1,000 Chinese characters, and unambiguous in its message. The manifesto has four sections. The first section condemns Protestant missionary activities in China as a form of imperialism. The second part examines the task of the Church and sides with government policy. The third focuses on future aims of the Church in patriotic terms. The last section lays out concrete methods.

"The Christian Manifesto" makes three central claims: first, the Chinese Church should obey the new communist government and partake in the building of a "new China". Second, the Church should cut its ties with Western "imperialism". Finally, the Church should strive to construct a Christianity indigenous to China embodying the so-called "Three-self principles": self-government, self-support, and self-propagation.

The manifesto urged Chinese Christians to pledge allegiance to the new People's Republic. Its main theme is anti-imperialism. The manifesto stresses that imperialism had used Christianity to extend its reach, "consciously or unconsciously, directly or indirectly", and that present-day Christianity ought to be "purged" from such tendencies. The United States is blamed for supporting reactionaries in the guise of religion.

The wording of the manifesto remains controversial to this day. Written in "carefully measured and relatively polite" terms, it goes out of is way not to blame the Church outright. The document urges Christians to accept the new communist reality, rather than to denounce their faith. The manifesto adopts the propagandistic language of the Chinese Communist Revolution resulting in overly optimistic and naive terms. It however failed to give the Chinese Church any guidance concerning its future in China under the CCP. The manifesto implied that compliance would be rewarded, and Chinese Christianity would prosper. In truth, the government would soon engage in persecution of many Christians.

The manifesto was intended for both domestic and foreign audiences. The covering letter accompanying it states that its target audience is people outside the Church and aims to educate them about the social and political position of Christianity in China.

== Responses by other parties ==
Many, if not most, Chinese Protestants thought that the manifesto was too radical. The Methodist Church in China refused to sign the manifesto, as did, initially, the Chung Hua Sheng Kung Hui (Anglican Church in China). Both issued alternative manifestos of their own. All Anglican bishops in China later caved in and signed "The Christian Manifesto", and almost all of them became TSPM associates. Initially, foreign missionary societies were perplexed by the manifesto that had been preceded by mixed messages. It was labeled as a partisan work of a faction within the Chinese Church. China Inland Mission, naively, brushed off charges of imperialism on the grounds that churches they had founded were relatively independent. When it was discovered that even "devout believers" had signed the manifesto, it was attributed to political pressure. When missionaries finally realized the implications of the manifesto, they had no choice but to condemn it, regarding it as a unilateral termination of their relationship with Chinese Christians. Although Chinese Protestants took no immediate action against missions, the manifesto marked the beginning of the end. The manifesto did not specify a time frame for the end of missionary activities, other than "within the shortest possible time". Consequentially, new missionaries were called to China even after the manifesto had been issued. Missionary activities effectively ended in China after a tit-for-tat involving the Chinese and American governments. First, in November 1950, the United States forbade any transfer of funds to China. China retaliated by prohibiting organizations in the country from receiving funding from abroad. By December, both countries had frozen each other's assets. An immediate order to Chinese churches to cease all cooperation with foreign missionaries soon followed.

Although Chinese Catholics were particularly defiant, they were as unable to resist as Protestants, their key positions having been domesticated by the government. Consequentially, the Catholics issued a manifesto very much like the Protestant one, in November 1950.

== Further analysis ==
Affiliates of the Chinese house churches (unofficial Protestant churches not affiliated with the TSPM) and other critics of the manifesto think that it sold out Christianity in China to the political elites. Leslie Theodore Lyall, for instance, called it outright a "betrayal". Gao Wangzhi, however, points out that the manifesto paints a sympathetic picture of the Chinese Church: its past allegiance to imperialism is called "unfortunate" and, overall, the Church's contributions are recognized. Gao, however, concedes that the manifesto "misled" Chinese Christians into thinking that they would be well-off with the new government. Foreign missionaries went as far as calling the manifesto "the failure of Christian conscience in China".

Gao argues that the manifesto is not to be entirely blamed on Wu. Rather, it was "a product of a particular time – from 1948 to 1950 – that witnessed the victory of the CCP and the establishment of the PRC". Similarly, Bob Whyte argues the manifesto was appropriate in its historical setting, as "[t]he tide of history had left them with no other choice".

Chinese academics and the TSPM attribute the Chinese Church's modern successes to "The Christian Manifesto". Official Chinese historiography claims that the initiative for "The Christian Manifesto" came from the Chinese Protestant Church, and Premier Zhou Enlai merely granted their wish. According to George A. Hood, it is more likely that Zhou had effectively forced the Church leaders to draft a manifesto in support of the government. Similarly, Oi Ki Ling attributes the Church's role to public pressure. Philip L. Wickeri, however, points out that the talks with Zhou were initiated by the Church. The project of securing religious freedom in China, although conditioned by Chinese patriotism, was thus a Christian endeavor instead of a government fiat. In other words, the Church had assumed agency and independence in relation to the CCP within the united front. Wickeri also points to the absence of Ting's signature and the initial failure of other Anglicans to sign as proof of alternatives to total submission in the early TSPM. Ting managed to become the head of the organization, and other prominent Anglicans were given positions in the movement, too.

Most experts think that the large number of signatories cannot be explained with reference to political convenience or pressure only. Robert G. Orr thinks that the number of signatories indicated that Chinese Christians agreed with the CCP regarding its analysis of imperialism in China. In this sense, it was a self-imposed condemnation of the missionary past of the Chinese Church. According to Wickeri, this was not necessarily a disadvantage since it allowed the Church to discover an indigenous Chinese identity and a new social conscience. This was central to the project of the TSPM as well. According to K. H. Ting, Chinese Christians genuinely espoused the "three-self" ideology. Chee Kong-Lee cites patriotism as the reason for the manifesto's success.

A middle of the road position holds that Chinese Church leaders acted with the sincere aim to preserve the Church, but by signing the manifesto they had to compromise with the leaders of the country to achieve that end.

Theologically, "The Christian Manifesto" reflects upon Wu's idea that the "Spirit of God" is discernible in the socio-political progress. According to Wickeri and Peter Tze Ming Ng, "The Christian Manifesto" is, however, not so much a theological treatise as it is a political statement. Wickeri contends that this was the only way that the Church could make its position understood by the largely non-Christian Chinese population who shared their patriotism but not their religion.

Before the manifesto, the Chinese Church had separated Church and state matters, but according to Oi, "The Christian Manifesto" marked a turning point in this regard.

== See also ==
- Anti-Christian Movement (China)
- Chinese Communist Revolution
- Chinese Independent Churches
- Four Olds
- History of the People's Republic of China (1949–1976)
- List of Protestant missionaries in China
