= Hunan Bible Institute =

Christian fundamentalist Bible school in early-20th century China

Hunan Bible Institute (Chinese: 湖南聖經學校; pinyin: Hunan Shengjing Xuexiao) was an important fundamentalist Bible school in early-20th century China. It was founded in 1916 and known as "Biola in China."

== History ==
Frank A. Keller, a missionary with the China Inland Mission, began evangelistic work among the houseboats of Hunan in 1909. He saw the need to train Chinese evangelists and, with the financial support of the brothers Lyman and Milton Stewart, who helped establish Biola and funded the publication of The Fundamentals, established Hunan Bible Institute.

From its foundations, it was envisioned to support the indigenous Chinese church. The curriculum was designed to develop Chinese evangelists, with training that was Bible-centered and Evangelism-driven. Its faculty members included influential Chinese such as Marcus Cheng, Cheng Jigui, and Li Qiron, and in 1931, 12 of the 16 faculty and staff were Chinese.

Despite the importance of Chinese leadership, when Keller was due to retire as superintendent, the Board of Founders looked to establish another missionary, Charles Roberts, as his replacement. In 1936, Chinese staff established their own Board of Directors and elected a Chinese president. But the Board of Founders dismissed this group and asked Keller to stay and establish a new committee that was dominated by foreign missionaries. By September 1936, Hunan Bible Institute lost most of its Chinese staff. When Keller retired in 1937, Roberts became its new superintendent and led the institute through the Second Sino-Japanese War.

The Hunan Bible Institute ultimately shut its doors after it was confiscated by Communist authorities in 1952. After the normalization of Sino-American relations in the late-1970s, Biola received $180,000 compensation for its properties, which helped establish Biola's School of Intercultural Studies in 1983.

== See also ==
- North China Theological Seminary
- Fundamentalist–Modernist Controversy
- Christianity in China
