= Jing Dianying =

Jing Dianying (Chinese: 敬奠瀛; 1890–1957) was the founder of the Jesus Family, a major Chinese Pentecostal church movement.
