= Simon Chan (theologian) =

Simon Chan is a Singaporean Chinese Christian theologian and ordained minister of the Assemblies of God.

== Biography ==
Chan received his M.Div. from Asian Theological Seminary and his MTheol in Systematic Theology from South East Asia Graduate School of Theology. He then completed his Ph.D. in Historical Theology from Cambridge University

Until 2016, Chan was the Earnest Lau Professor of Systematic Theology and dean of studies at Trinity Theological College, Singapore. From 1997 to 2013, he edited the seminary's Trinity Theological Journal. Since 2016, he has been the editor of the Asian Journal of Theology.

== Works ==
- Chan, Simon (1997). Man and Sin: An Independent-Study Textbook. Springfield, MO: Global University System Berean. ISBN 9781906256739
- Chan, Simon (1998). Spiritual Theology: A Systematic Study of the Christian Life. Downers Grove, IL: InterVarsity Press. ISBN 9780830876990
- Chan, Simon (2000). Pentecostal Theology and the Christian Spiritual Tradition. Sheffield: Sheffield Academic Press. ISBN 9781841271446
- Chan, Simon (2006). Liturgical Theology: The Church as Worshiping Community. Downers Grove, IL: IVP Academic. ISBN 9780830876204
- Chan, Simon (2014). Grassroots Asian Theology: Thinking the Faith from the Ground Up. Downers Grove, IL: IVP Academic. ISBN 9780830840489
