= Christian Tabernacle =

Independent Chinese church

The Christian Tabernacle (Chinese: 基督徒會堂; pinyin: Jidutu Huitang) is an independent Chinese church founded by Wang Mingdao in Beijing in 1925. The Christian Tabernacle was founded without the help of foreign missionaries so in essence it was Chinese Christians preaching to the Chinese populace. From the beginning, this church has been administratively self-governing and financially self-sufficient.

== Entry requirements ==
Wang Mingdao was especially tight on church entry. During the sixteen years from 1933–1949, only 570 new believers received baptism since new believers were required to bring another convert to the church before baptism was allowed. He said, "The sheep must have life, your behaviour of giving birth to more sheep shows that you have life". Therefore, being able to bring people to believe in the faith is evidence that indeed you are quite clear of the path to salvation. Although it does not mean that you have already received salvation, it shows that you are worthy to become one of their church members.

Once Wang Mingdao's strict entry requirements were satisfied, both the new converts' behaviour and lifestyle were to be closely observed and examined by church members for a brief time period. This was done in order to confirm that the new believer was sincerely behaving in a way that a Christian ought to behave and that their faith did have a solid foundation.
