= Jesus Family =

Chinese Pentecostal communitarian church

The Jesus Family (Chinese: 耶穌家庭; pinyin: Yēsū jiātíng) was a Chinese Pentecostal communitarian church established in 1921 by Jing Dianying. It began in the rural village of Mazhuang in the city Tai'an of Shandong province. The church was primarily located in rural and semirural areas, where members had everything in common, inspired by the life of the apostles in the book of Acts. The church emphasized a simple lifestyle, spiritual experiences like prophecy as well as the second coming of Christ. In 1949, there were over a hundred of these communities, numbering thousands of people. In 1952, the Jesus Family was dismantled and its leader, Jing Dianying, was put into prison and died there.
