= Wang Ming-Dao =

Chinese pastor and writer imprisoned from 1955 until 1980 (1900–1991)

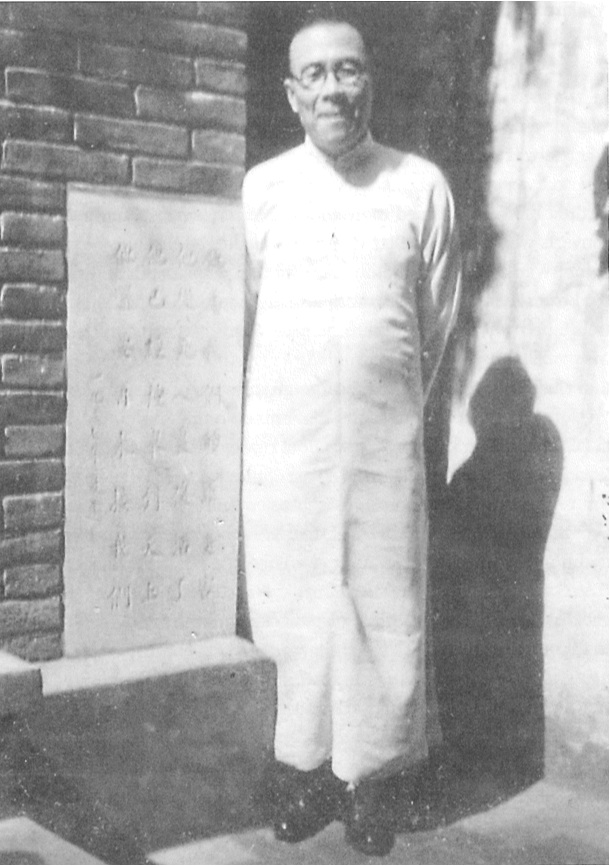
- Wang at the Christian Tabernacle in Beijing, c. 1950
- Born: July 25, 1900; Beijing, China
- Died: July 28, 1991 (aged 91); Shanghai, China

Wang Ming-Dao (Chinese: 王明道; pinyin: Wàng Míngdào; Wade–Giles: Wang⁴ Ming²-Tao⁴, July 25, 1900 – July 28, 1991) or Wong Ming-dao was a Chinese Protestant pastor and evangelist imprisoned by the Chinese government in 1955 and from 1963 until 1980. He has been called the "Dean of the House Churches."

== Name ==
Wang's personal name was "Yong-shung" (Chinese: 永盛; pinyin: Yǒngshèng) until 1920, when he "unconditionally submitted to God" and formally changed his name to "Ming-Dao" (Chinese: 明道; pinyin: Míngdào) which means approximately "Testify to the Way."

== Biography ==
=== Childhood and conversion ===
Wang was born in the foreign legation quarter of Beijing in 1900 while it was under siege of the Boxers. His early life was one of extreme poverty and repeated illness; but he had an inquiring mind and did well at a London Missionary Society school. He later said his poverty had been something of a spiritual advantage because there were many sins that took money to commit. At first Wang hoped to become a great political leader, and he put a picture of Abraham Lincoln on his wall to remind himself of his goal.

Converted to Christianity at fourteen, Wang came to believe "that all kinds of sinful practices in society had their exact counterparts in the church." He decided that the church "needed a revolution" and that God had entrusted to him the mission of bringing it about. In 1919 Wang became a teacher at a Presbyterian mission school in Baoding, a hundred miles south of the capital, but was dismissed in 1920 when he insisted on being baptized by immersion. His mother and sister thought his behavior so peculiar that they believed him mentally ill, and Wang himself later admitted that the "persecution" he had received from others was in part the result of his own immaturity.

=== Pastor ===
In 1923, after a good deal of personal Bible study but no formal theological training, Wang moved towards a more mature understanding of the Protestant doctrine of justification by faith. In February 1925, he began holding religious meetings in his home in Peking, meetings which eventuated in the founding of the Christian Tabernacle, a church which by 1937 had its own building seating several hundred, and which was one of the largest evangelical churches in China during the 1940s. Wang also had an itinerant ministry throughout China, visiting twenty-four of the twenty-eight provinces and taking the pulpit in churches of thirty different denominations. Wang was often absent from his own church for six months of the year. In 1926, Wang began publishing a religious newspaper, Spiritual Food Quarterly (Chinese: 靈食季刊; pinyin: Líng shí jìkān).

=== Conflict with the Japanese and the Communists ===
Wang believed both that church and state should be separate and that Christians should not be "yoked together with unbelievers." When the Japanese occupied Peking during World War II, they insisted that all churches join in a Japanese organized federation of churches. Wang refused on a number of occasions. Despite threats of various kinds, he was not arrested, and his church was allowed to continue to hold services.

When the Communists gained control of China, Wang believed that the new government might indeed allow the religious freedom it had promised. Nevertheless, after the Maoists won the Chinese Civil War, the government pressured churches that had been started by Western missionaries to unite in denouncing Western imperialism. Wang was pressured but refused on the grounds that his church had never had any connection with missionaries.

In August 1955, Wang was arrested for refusing to join the Three-Self Patriotic Movement (TSPM), the state-controlled church. A few months earlier Wang had written a long article attacking the Three-Self Committee headed by Y. T. Wu as a group composed of modernist unbelievers with whom true Christians should have nothing to do. Wang, his wife, and eighteen church members, were imprisoned, and the Christian Tabernacle was closed. After signing a confession, making a humiliating plea for mercy from those he had previously denounced as "false prophets," and promising to participate in the TSPM, Wang was released from prison. Then after recovering from a possible nervous breakdown, Wang recanted, was rearrested in 1957, and was sentenced to life imprisonment in 1963. After the United States reestablished diplomatic relations with China in 1972, human rights organizations began to pressure China to release its political prisoners. When the Chinese government attempted to release Wang in 1979, he refused (like St. Paul in Acts 16:35–40) to leave until his name had been cleared. In 1980 the prison tricked Wang into leaving, in Wang's words "not released but… forced out by deception."

=== Final days ===
After Wang's release he received numerous visitors to his tiny apartment in Shanghai, including foreigners from Europe, North America, and Asia. The sheer volume of visitors made Chinese security officers nervous, especially since Wang made frank statements about his past treatment by the government. Wang remained unapologetic, and when a member of the Three-Self Church sent him a donation, Wang sent it back.

Between 1987 and 1989, Wang's physical and mental abilities noticeably declined. In July 1991, Wang was diagnosed with blood clots on his brain, and he died on July 28, followed by his wife's death in 1992. As one authority has noted, despite Wang's old age and declining influence, he had "remained an unrivaled symbol of uncompromising faith until his death."

=== Marriage and personal characteristics ===
In 1928, Wang (through what might be called semi-arrangement) married Liu Jingwen, the much younger daughter of a Protestant pastor in Hangzhou. They experienced a long and happy marriage and had a son, Wang Tianzhe, who survived them; but their temperaments were remarkably dissimilar. Wang was obsessive about details, whereas his wife was (in his words) "only concerned about the general effect," "happy-go-lucky," and "very forgetful." Wang could be hasty to the point of rashness, and he also frequently failed to express proper sympathy or sensitivity. Jingwen was exceptionally patient and considerate of others, but she stunned Wang by correcting him in public, taking the view that since he had spoken unwisely in front of others, she had the duty to correct him before others as well. Wang recalled that after twenty years of instruction from his wife, he had made "a measure of progress," but he also warned readers of his autobiography that Jingwen "should not necessarily be taken as a model in this respect." Wang's sermons also reflected changes in gender relations that occurred during the early Republican period, and he preached about marriage, concubinage, and the place of woman in the family.

== Religious teachings ==
Professor Lian Xi of Duke Divinity School described Wang Ming-Dao as purveying a "fundamentalist faith" with "simplicity and certainty". He believed in the inerrancy of the Bible, the depravity of man, and justification by faith. He criticized what he saw as shortcomings of both Chinese and missionary churches, emphasizing that Christians should live holy lives. Wang likened himself to the prophet Jeremiah who had attacked social corruption and false prophets, and Wang especially opposed purveyors of liberal theology such as Western missionaries and the YMCA, which he said had destroyed the faith of young people.

Wang rejected the doctrine of the Trinity, believing it an "error." He also thought that attributing divinity to Jesus was "absurd and reckless" and preferred to emphasize that Jesus was the Son of God. Wang believed that neither the Trinity nor the divinity of Christ were taught in the Bible.

Wang founded the Christian Tabernacle, which emphasized "the practical aspects of the Christian life." Wang believed that the greatest responsibility of church leaders was to help Christians "tread the path of holiness." He often refused baptism to converts until they had proved that their Christianity was more than a "profession of their lips." An obsessively orderly man, Wang's advice included admonitions against spitting, flirting, brawling, and chewing on raw garlic. Conversely, he advised Christians to be timely, wear proper attire, and observe traffic rules. Although the Pentecostal preacher who had immersed Wang tried to have him speak in tongues, Wang balked at making repetitive nonsense sounds, and he was repelled by the "indecorous behavior of some Pentecostals who 'danced, clapped, and shouted wildly' during revival meetings."

Wang never took the title "pastor," he permitted no choir, and his church had no liturgy. He rarely allowed anyone but his immediate fellow workers to preach from his pulpit, fearing that other preachers might harbor heretical ideas or be living lives "full of deceit, covetousness, lewdness, envy, pride and selfishness."

== Works ==
- Wong, Ming-Dao (1981), A Stone Made Smooth, Southampton, Mayflower Christian Books, ISBN 0-907821-00-6
- Wang, Ming-Dao (1983), A Call to the Church, Fort Washington, CLC, ISBN 0-87508-094-4
- Wong, Ming-Dao (1983), Spiritual Food, Southampton, Mayflower Christian Books, ISBN 0-907821-01-4
- Wong, Ming-Dao (1989), Day by Day, Crowborough, Highland Books, ISBN 0-946616-43-4
- Wong, Ming-Dao (1990), The Spiritual Gifts Movement, Southampton, Mayflower Christian Books
- Wang Ming Tao tr. Ding (1993), God's Grace in Suffering, Hong Kong, Living Books for All (CLC), ISBN 962-7329-04-5
