= China Christian Council =

State-regulated Protestant organization in China

Chinese Christian Council
- Merged into: United Front Work Department of the Central Committee of the Chinese Communist Party
- Founded: 1980; 46 years ago
- Website: www.ccctspm.org

The China Christian Council (CCC; Chinese: 中国基督教协会; pinyin: Zhōngguó Jīdūjiào Xiéhuì) is a government-sanctioned umbrella organization for all Protestant churches in the People's Republic of China. Founded in 1980, it works to provide theological education and the publication of Bibles (mostly in the Chinese Union Version), hymnals (the Chinese New Hymnal mostly), and other religious literature. Its current head is Bishop K. H. Ting.

== History ==
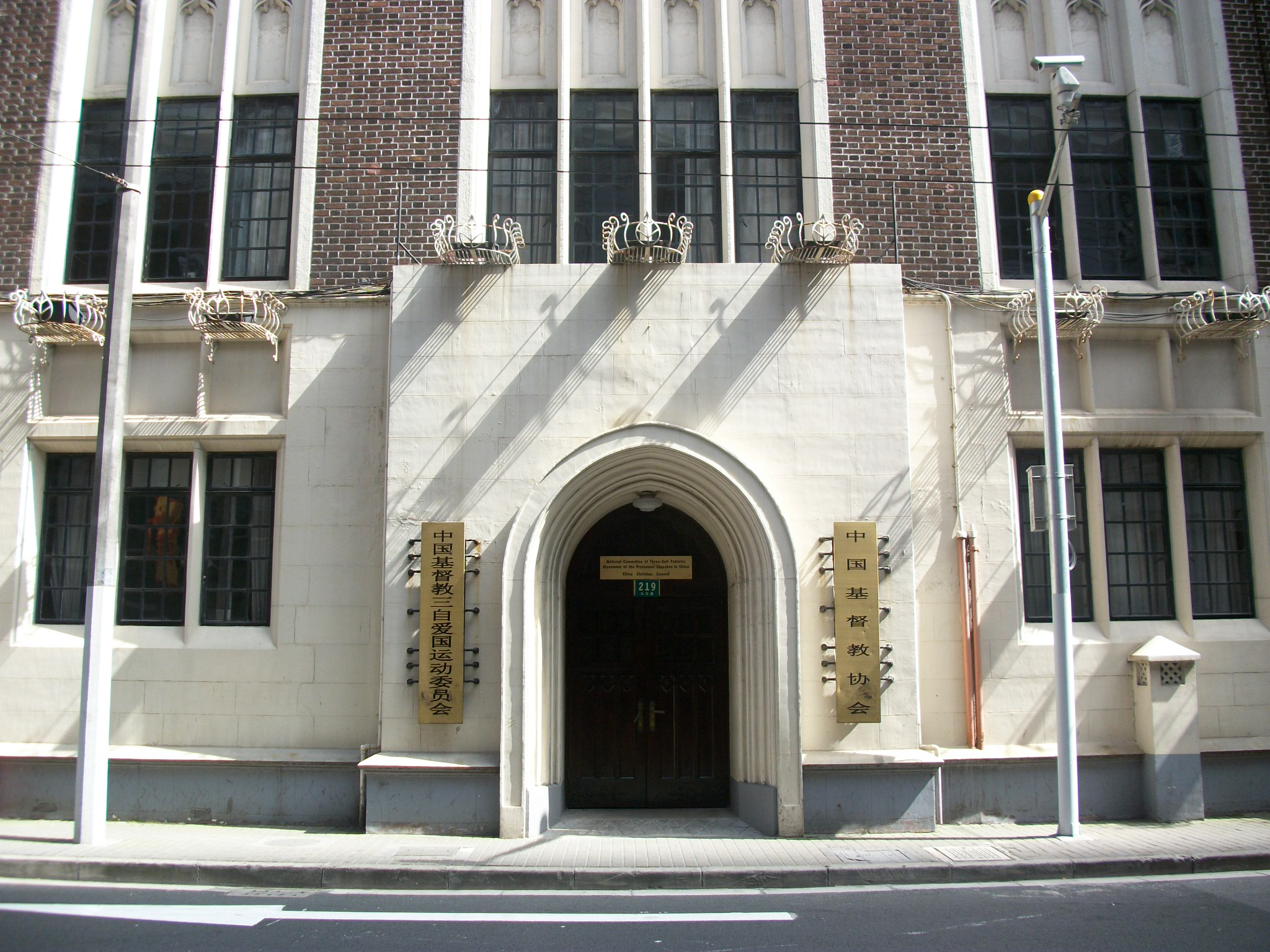
CCC&TSPM office on Jiujiang Road, Shanghai

In 1951, the Chinese government created the Religious Affairs Bureau, which later became the National Religious Affairs Administration, to manage the oversight of five officially-recognized religions: Buddhism, Catholicism, Taoism, Islam, and Protestantism.

In the spring of 1979, Chinese churches resumed worship after the Cultural Revolution. In order to revive the church, the China Christian Council was founded at the third national Christian conference in 1980, to unite and provide services for churches in China, formulating Church Order and encouraging theological education. Daniel Bays suggests that there is "a real desire for pastoral and congregational nurturing and spiritual development in the CCC, and perhaps a desire to separate from the direct political role of the TSPM."

Together with the Three-Self Patriotic Movement, the organizations are known as the lianghui (两会), or "two organizations." Through the CCC, the registered Protestant church participates in the World Council of Churches. The CCC serves to unite and provide services for churches in China by formulating Church Order, encouraging theological education through seminaries and Bible schools, such as Nanjing Union Theological Seminary, publishing Bibles and other Christian materials, and coordinating training programs for churches.

In the recent 30 years, Christianity in China has developed rapidly. It introduces the best developing period in Chinese Christian history. Incomplete statistics indicate that there may be over 23 million Christians throughout the country, 30 times more than in 1949. There may also be over 56,000 churches and meeting points, 70 percent of which are newly built. More than 55 million copies of the Bible have been printed, 3,500,000 copies per year in recent years. There are a total of 21 theological seminaries with more than 1900 students in China.

The CCC/TSPM headquarters are No. 219, Jiujiang Road, Huangpu District, Shanghai (Postcode: 200002). The organizations jointly publish the Tian Feng magazine.

In 2018, during a series of institutional reforms, the National Religious Affairs Administration was merged into the United Front Work Department of the Central Committee of the Chinese Communist Party.

== Statistics ==
The number of members of churches affiliated with the Chinese Christian Council has grown significantly since its founding:

- In 1980, the CCC represented approximately 3 million faithful.
- In 2000, it was estimated that there were about 15 million members.
- In 2010, the number of affiliated Protestants exceeded 23 million, as reported by independent researchers.
- In 2018, according to the State Council Information Office, there were approximately 38 million registered members.

This growth is attributed to greater relative religious freedom following Deng Xiaoping's reforms, urbanization, and a growing search for spiritual meaning among the Chinese.

== Leadership ==
The current leadership were elected at the tenth National Christian Conference held in November 2018.

- President

Rev. Wu Wei Chinese: 吴巍

- General Secretary

Rev. Shan Weixiang Chinese: 单渭祥

== Ministries ==
- The Ministry of Theological Renewal
- Publication Ministry
- Theological Education and Training Ministry
- Social Service Ministry
- Overseas Exchange Ministry

== Departments ==
- Overseas Relations Department
- Training Department
- Publication Department
- Tian Feng Editorial Department
- Social Service Department
- Research Department
- Administration Office

== Ecumenical Relations ==
The Chinese Christian Council maintains relations with several international ecumenical organizations. It is a member of the World Council of Churches and an associate member of the World Communion of Reformed Churches.

== See also ==
- Laws regarding religious activities in China
