= Y. T. Wu =

Chinese Protestant leader (1893–1979)

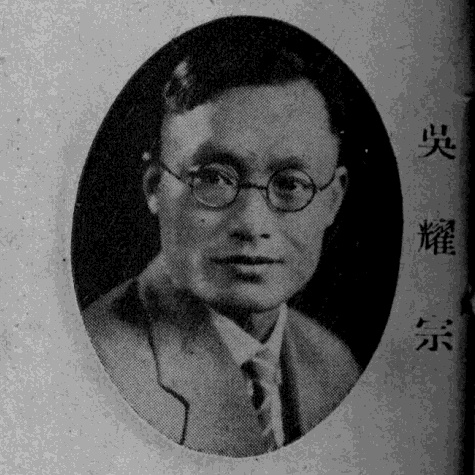
Y. T. Wu in 1937

Y. T. Wu or Wu Yao-tsung (simplified Chinese: 吴耀宗; traditional Chinese: 吳耀宗; pinyin: Wú Yaòzōng; 4 November 1893 – 17 September 1979) was a Protestant leader in China who played a key role in the establishment of the Three-Self Patriotic Movement. Wu also played an important role in the theology of K. H. Ting.

== Biography ==
Wu was born in Guangzhou on 4 November 1893 to a family engaged in commerce. Beginning in 1913, he studied tax at a school for tax studies in Beijing and, upon graduation, worked for a customs office.

Wu converted to Christianity in his youth. In 1918, he became a member of a Congregational Church and was baptized. In 1924, he worked for YMCA, managing its schools and then went to the United States to study at Union Theological Seminary (affiliated with the Columbia University) at New York City, from which he earned a master's degree in philosophy.

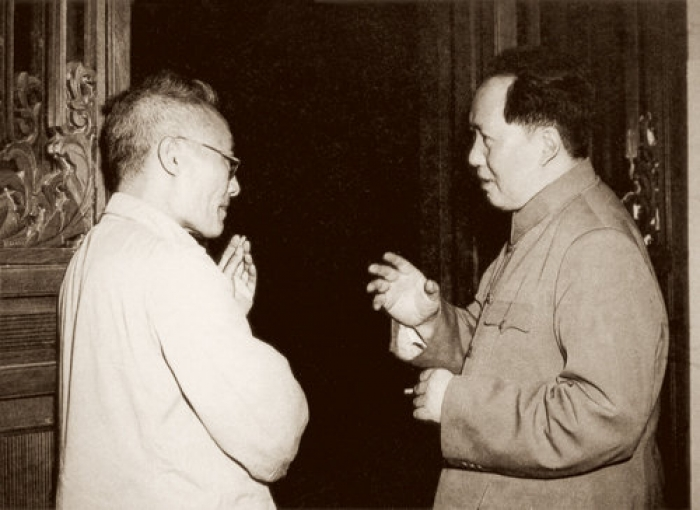
Y. T. Wu and Mao Zedong (June 1950)

Wu became a proponent of the social gospel and was critical of what he called "the opiate-laden gospel of individual salvation." He emphasized the ethical teachings of Jesus rather than supernaturally-oriented theology. He had been a YMCA secretary, author, and editor of a Christian magazine before the Chinese Communist Revolution was complete. Wu was regarded as one of the earliest to reflect on the use of "violence in revolution and theological implications of communism" among Chinese Christian leaders. He was initially critical of the use of force by Chinese communists and considered himself a pacifist and did not want to join the Communist Party.

However, in 1949 Wu was invited to participate in United Front Work Department activities. Wu, along with four other Protestant and two Buddhist leaders attended the first Chinese People's Political Consultative Conference (CPPCC) in Beijing from September 21 through 30, 1949. Wu acted as the delegation's head and declared "complete concurrence and absolute support" for the CPPCC's Common Program. In 1950, in consultation with Premier Zhou Enlai, Wu and a number of other Christian leaders drafted "The Christian Manifesto", eventually signed by 400,000 signatories. Following an April 1951 conference, the Preparatory Committee of the Chinese Christian Resist-America-Aid-Korea Three-Self Reform Movement (TSRM) was formed with Wu as it chairman. Three years later the TSRM gave way to the Three-Self Patriotic Movement, again with Wu as chairman. In an address to the conference that marked that transition, he denounced Hudson Taylor, the late founder of the China Inland Mission, as an imperialist tool. Wu remained a dominant figure in the movement until the Cultural Revolution of 1966–77, during which he was put to forced labor.

Wu died in Beijing on 17 September 1979, one year before the re-establishment of the Three-Self Patriotic Movement and the creation of the China Christian Council, both of which were led for nearly two decades by Bishop K.H. Ting.

== Theology ==
In the 1920s, Y. T. Wu was a pacifist and sought to create fellowship among youth. He aimed to cultivate in parishioners a personality compatible with the spirit of Jesus for the liberation and development of the Chinese people's lives. Over the next decade, Wu was attracted to the social gospel, which aims to provide religious-ethical solutions to the problems of social injustice and to advocate gradual social reform. Under this system, focus is shifted from individual salvation to social salvation. In his mind, Christians should participate in social reform in order to create an ideal society, by which the kingdom of heaven would be brought about. From the mid-1930s until 1949, Wu started to appreciate and sympathize with the communist theory of social revolution and he gradually came to the opinion that communism would be the only instrument for national salvation. In 1941, in his theological treatise No Man Has Seen God, he wrote:

Our conclusion is that belief in God is not contradictory to materialism, just as it is not contradictory to "evolution," because both "evolution" and materialism can be taken as the means by which God reveals Himself in nature… A person who believes in God can also believe in materialism… Even a materialist should be able to accept faith in God… How do we know in the future the two seemingly contradictory systems of thought will not achieve a new synthesis?

This paragraph illustrates his expectation of a harmonious relationship between a liberal variety of Christian profession and communism. This belief encouraged Wu to carry on his career in the new China in the 1950s, a period in which Wu was trusted by the communist leadership, chiefly because of his suppliancy towards Marxist ideology, and in 1951 he launched the TSPM. In response to the communist campaign to purge the political sphere of the impact of the so-called "Three Mountains" of imperialism, feudalism, and bureaucratic capitalism, the churches which participated in the TSPM started to express hostility towards foreign missions. In a serial article under the title of "The Reformation of Christianity: On the Awakening of Christians," Wu said:

we believe that renovation within Christianity must come. Christianity once passed from the Roman religion under feudalism to Protestantism under capitalism. Now the development is from capitalism to socialism… Christianity must learn that the present period is one of liberation for the people, the collapse of the old system. …God had taken the key to the salvation of mankind from its hand and given it to another.

== Works ==
- Wu, Yaozong (2010). Wu Yaozong wenxuan [The Selected Works of Y. T. Wu] (in Chinese). Shanghai: TSPM and CCC.

== See also ==
- Protestant missions in China
- Political theology in China
