= Three-Self Patriotic Movement =

State-regulated Protestant organization in China

- 三自爱国运动
- Abbreviation: TSPM
- Classification: Christian
- Orientation: Protestant
- Scripture: Protestant Bible
- Theology: Trinitarianism
- Governance: National Committee
- Chairperson: Fu Xianwei
- Secretary General: Xu Xiaohong
- Associations: China Christian Council; World Council of Churches
- Region: China
- Founder: State Administration for Religious Affairs
- Origin: 1954; 72 years ago
- Absorbed: National Christian Council of China
- Merged into: United Front Work Department of the Central Committee of the Chinese Communist Party
- Official website: en.ccctspm.org

Three-Self Patriotic Movement
- Simplified Chinese: 三自爱国运动
- Traditional Chinese: 三自愛國運動
Transcriptions
Standard Mandarin
- Hanyu Pinyin: Sānzì Àiguó Yùndòng
- Wade–Giles: Santzu Aikuo Yüntung
- Yale Romanization: Sandz Aigwo Yundung
Yue: Cantonese
- Yale Romanization: sāam jih oi gwok wahn duhng
- Jyutping: saam1 zi6 oi3 gwok3 wan6 dung6

The Three-Self Patriotic Movement (TSPM; Chinese: 三自爱国运动; pinyin: Sānzì Àiguó Yùndòng) is the official government supervisory organ for Protestantism in the People's Republic of China. It is colloquially known as the Three-Self Church (Chinese: 三自教会; pinyin: Sānzì Jiàohuì).

The National Committee of the Three-Self Patriotic Movement of the Protestant Churches in China (Chinese: 中国基督教三自爱国运动委员会; pinyin: Zhōngguó Jīdūjiào Sānzì Àiguó Yùndòng Wěiyuánhuì) and the China Christian Council (CCC) are known in China as the lianghui (two organizations). Together, they form the state-sanctioned Protestant church in mainland China. They are overseen by the United Front Work Department (UFWD) of the Central Committee of the Chinese Communist Party (CCP) following the State Administration for Religious Affairs' absorption into the UFWD in 2018.

== History ==
The three principles of self-governance, self-support (i.e., financial independence from foreigners), and self-propagation (i.e., indigenous missionary work) were first articulated by Henry Venn, General Secretary of the Church Missionary Society from 1841 to 1873, and Rufus Anderson, foreign secretary of the American Board of Commissioners for Foreign Missions. The "Nevius Method", named for John Livingstone Nevius, a missionary to China and Korea, developed the three-self principle of Venn and Anderson into a plan establishing indigenous churches.

By 1877 three-self principles were much discussed among missionaries to China. The principles were drafted formally during an 1892 conference in Shanghai of Christian missions reflecting an almost universal agreement that the future of the Chinese church depended on the indigenization of the leadership, and the finding of sufficiently Chinese modes of worship.

At the time of the founding of the PRC, Chinese Protestants were a diverse group, including indigenous Protestant groups and liberal Protestants who were critical of the work of foreign missionaries. Substantial portions of China's Protestant communities favored cooperation with the PRC.

=== Christian Manifesto ===
In May 1950, Y. T. Wu and other prominent Protestant leaders such as T. C. Chao, Chen Chonggui, and Cora Deng met in Beijing with Chinese premier Zhou Enlai to discuss Protestant Christianity's relationship with the young People's Republic of China. "The Christian Manifesto" was published in July 1950 and its original title was "Direction of Endeavor for Chinese Christianity in the Construction of New China". During the 1950s, 400,000 Protestant Christians publicly endorsed and signed this document.

The purpose of publishing this document was:

to heighten our vigilance against imperialism, to make known the clear political stand of Christians in New China, to hasten the building of a Chinese church whose affairs are managed by the Chinese themselves, and to indicate the responsibilities that should be taken up by Christians throughout the whole country in national reconstruction in New China.

It further stated the movement promoted the "self-governance, self-support, and self-propagation" (Chinese: 自治、自养、自传; pinyin: zìzhì, zìyǎng, zìchuán) of the Chinese church.

=== Three-Self Reform Movement ===
In March 1951, after China's entry into the Korean War, the Religious Affairs Bureau directed religious groups to make elimination of imperialist influences a priority. In mid-April the State Administrative Council called together a conference in Beijing on the subject of "Handling of Christian Organizations Receiving Subsidies from the United States of America". This conference led to the formation of the Preparatory Committee for the Oppose-America, Assist-Korea Three-Self Reform Movement of the Christian Church (TSRM) under China's United Work Front policy. Those who attended the conference issued a "United Declaration" calling churches and other Christian organizations "to thoroughly, permanently and completely sever all relationships with the American missions and all other missions, thus realizing self-government, self-support and self-propagation in the Chinese church". The declaration had the unexpected effect of swelling the membership of congregations that identified themselves as "self-run".

Most Protestant groups in China joined the movement. Significant exceptions included groups led by Wang Mingdao and Yuan Xiangchen.

=== Establishment ===
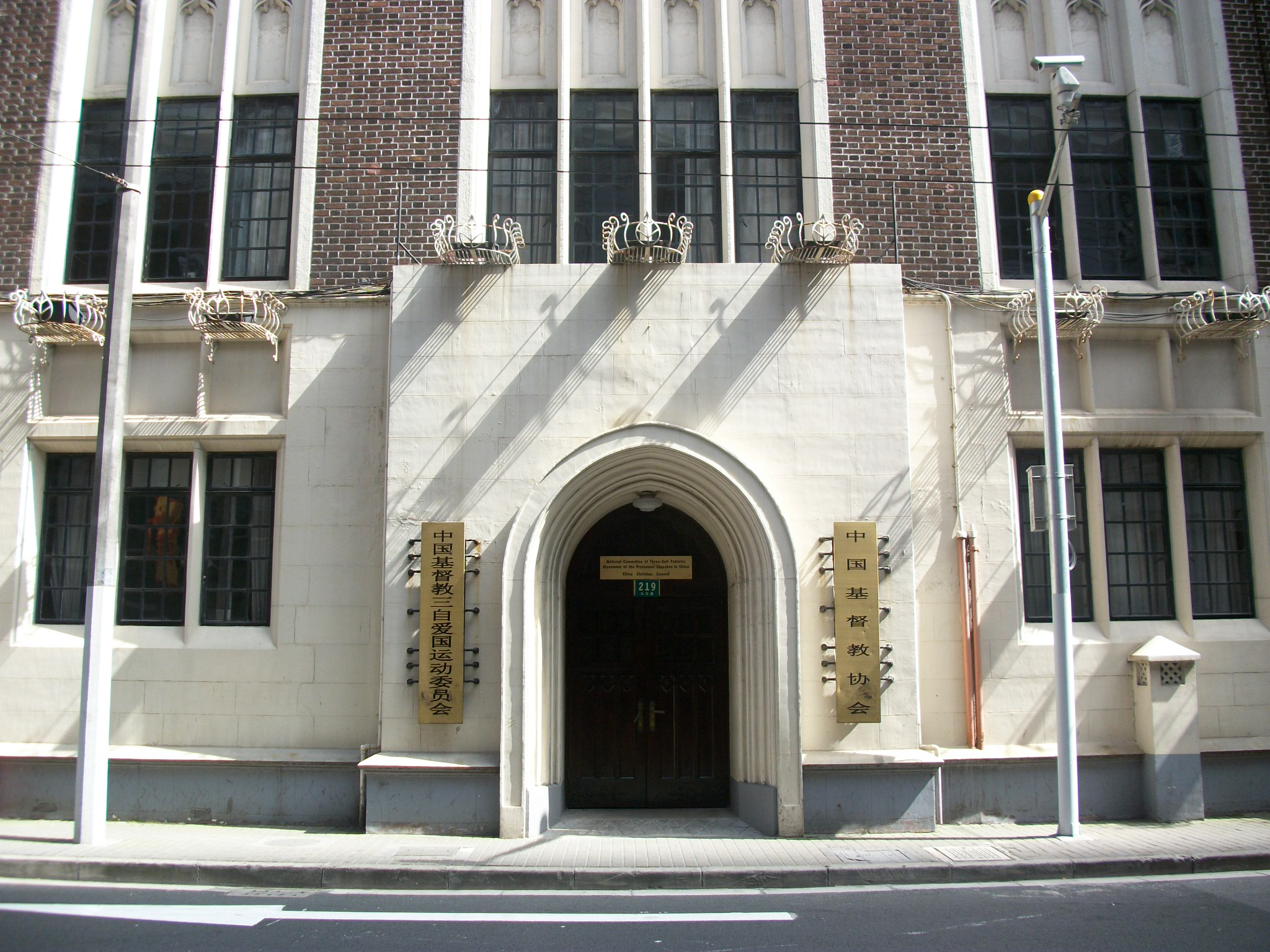
CCC&TSPM office on Jiujiang Road, Shanghai

When the TSPM was established in 1954, it promoted a three-self strategy in order to remove foreign influences from the Chinese churches and to assure the government that the churches would be patriotic to the newly established People's Republic of China. Other Protestant leaders included Jia Yuming, Marcus Cheng, and Yang Shaotang.

When "The Christian Manifesto" was published in the People's Daily in 1954, it pledged the support of Christians for anti-imperialism, anti-feudalism, and anti-bureaucratic capitalism efforts. The movement, in the eyes of critics, allowed the government to infiltrate, subvert, and control much of organized Christianity.

The work towards establishing the Protestant TSPM was seen to have potential also for Chinese Catholics to create a "three-self" (or, in English sources, often translated "three-autonomies") patriotic organization, even though this language was never used in earlier Catholic missiological discourse like it was by Protestant missionaries. Those who resisted were arrested or killed. But by 1957, some Chinese Catholics eventually established the Chinese Catholic Patriotic Association.

=== After the Cultural Revolution ===
From 1966 to 1976 during the Cultural Revolution, the expression of religious life in China was effectively banned, including the TSPM. The growth of the Chinese house church movement during this period was a result of all Chinese Christian worship being driven underground for fear of persecution. In 1979 the government officially restored the TSPM after thirteen years of non-existence, and in 1980 the China Christian Council (CCC) was formed. However, many Christians in China were skeptical of the government's intention in reinstituting the TSPM, partly because those entrusted in its local administration were often ones who had participated in repressive actions in the past.

In 1980, the CCP Central Committee approved a request by the United Front Work Department to create a national conference for religious groups. The TSPM was one of five such religious groups, which also included the Islamic Association of China, the Chinese Taoist Association, the Catholic Patriotic Association, and the Buddhist Association of China.

The TSPM is not a denomination, and denominational distinctions do not exist within the organization. Pastors are trained at one of thirteen officially sanctioned seminaries. Current theological emphasis is on "a protection and promotion of the five basic tenets of Christian faith—the Trinity, Christ being both human and God, the Virgin Birth, Death and Resurrection and the Second Coming". The primary role of the TSPM was then delegated to liaison with the Government whereas the CCC serves as an ecclesial organization focusing on the internal management and affairs of the Church.

Oversight of religion flows from recognition by the Chinese Communist Party of five religions: Buddhism, Catholicism, Taoism, Islam, and Protestantism, although the CCP's nearly 100 million members are required to be atheist. Authorities tightly monitor registered and unregistered religious groups, and the TSPM is often charged with being an instrument for the secular Chinese government, which persecutes Christians outside of it. Independent congregations are known as house churches. The attempt to bring house church Christians into the fold of "registered" meeting places has met with mixed results. Since the ascension of CCP general secretary Xi Jinping, the Chinese government has cracked down on house churches and oppressed their members, actions which the TSPM has supported.

In 2018, the TSPM's parent organization, the State Administration for Religious Affairs, was absorbed into the CCP's United Front Work Department.

In March 2019, Xu Xiaohong, the chairman of the National Three-Self Patriotic Movement Committee, gave a speech about the use of Christianity by western powers to destabilize China and the Chinese Communist Party (CCP). In addition he stated in a speech at the Chinese People's Political Consultative Conference that "Anti-China forces in the West are attempting to continue to influence the social stability of our country through Christianity, and even subvert the political power of our country". He also called for continued state action against independent Christians, stating "For individual black sheep who, under the banner of Christianity, participate in subverting national security, we firmly support the country to bring them to justice".

== Publications ==
The Chinese New Hymnal, first published in the 1980s, is the official hymnal of the TSPM churches. Editors include Lin Shengben, a renowned hymn composer in Shanghai.

The Canaan Hymns hymnal associated with the house churches is also used in TSPM churches. Through its official channels, TSPM has criticized the hymn for supposedly questioning the Movement's view of Christianity in service of Chinese socialism. TSPM church services also feature non-Christian Communist Party songs.

The main periodical of TSPM is Tian Feng.

== Statement of faith ==
The following confession of faith was adopted by the TSPM on 8 January 2008:

The Chinese Church takes the contents of the entire Bible, the Apostles' Creed and the Nicene Creed as the foundation of our faith, the main points of which are as follows:

Ours is a Triune God, everlasting and eternal.

God is Spirit. God is loving, just, holy, and trustworthy. God is almighty Father, the Lord who creates and sustains the cosmos and all that is in it, who keeps and cares for the whole world.

Jesus Christ is the only Son of God, born of the Holy Spirit, the Word made flesh, wholly God and wholly human. He came into the world to save humankind, to witness to God the Father, to preach the gospel; he was crucified, died, and was buried. He rose again and ascended into heaven. He will come again to judge the world.

The Holy Spirit is the Comforter, who enables people to know their sinfulness and to repent, who bestows wisdom and ability and every grace, leading us to know God and to enter into the truth, enabling people to live holy lives, and to give beautiful witness to Christ.

The church is the body of Christ and Christ is its Head. The church is apostolic, one, holy, and catholic. The visible church is called by God to be a fellowship of those who believe in Jesus Christ. It was established by the apostles as Jesus instructed them. The mission of the church is to preach the gospel, to administer the Sacraments, to teach and nurture believers, to do good works, and to bear witness to the Lord. The church is both universal and particular. The Chinese Church must build itself up in love and be one in Christ.

The Bible has been revealed by God and written down by human beings through the inspiration of the Holy Spirit. The Bible is the highest authority in matters of faith and the standard of life for believers. Through the leading of the Holy Spirit, people in different times have gained new light in the Bible. The Bible should be interpreted in accordance with the principle of rightly explaining the word of truth. It should not be interpreted arbitrarily or out of context.

Human beings are made in the image of God, but cannot become gods. God has given humanity dominion over all God's creation. Because of sin, human beings have diminished God's glory, yet through faith and the grace of Jesus Christ, human beings are redeemed and saved, and are granted resurrection and everlasting life.

Christ will come again. According to the teachings of the Bible, no one knows the day of his coming, and any method to determine when Christ will come again violates the teachings of the Bible.

A Christian's faith and works are one. Christians must live out Christ in the world, glorifying God and benefiting people.

== See also ==
- List of the largest Protestant denominations
- Christianity in China
- Protestantism in China
- Catholic Patriotic Association
- Henry Venn
- Chinese Independent Churches
- Positive Christianity
- Christian communism
