= Shandong Theological Seminary =

Shandong Theological Seminary (simplified Chinese: 山东神学院; traditional Chinese: 山東神學院; pinyin: Shāndōng Shénxuéyuàn) is the only Christian theological college in Shandong Province of eastern China. It was founded in 1987 by the Shandong Provincial Christian Council in Jinan, the provincial capital. Since its establishment, the seminary has produced nearly 2,000 graduates for the churches of Shandong. The school also owns the "Qilu Theological Research Center", which was established in cooperation with the Chinese Academy of Social Sciences.

== Brief history ==
In 1987, the Shandong Provincial Christian Council established Shandong Theological Seminary in Jinan City, using the office space of the Jinan Christian Council.

In 1998, the school moved to a new campus in Huaiyin District, Jinan City. The new campus covers an area of more than 90,000 square meters, with a building area of about 9,000 square meters.

In 2011, the school was upgraded to a religious institute of higher learning with the qualification to run undergraduate degree programs in theology. It recruited students from Shandong Province with a tentative enrollment of 150 people. The unveiling ceremony was held in 2012.

In 2017, in cooperation with the Chinese Academy of Social Sciences, the "Qilu Theological Research Center" was established on the campus of the seminary, focusing on the combination of Qilu culture and Christianity.

== Current situation ==
The purpose of Shandong Theological Seminary is to cultivate pastoral talents equipped with theological knowledge, love for the religion and the country, and the ability to shepherd Christian believers in the true faith for Shandong Province. The college offers four-year undergraduate programs, three-year junior college programs, and one-year training classes. It provides both common and professional courses, and, in line with the needs of Shandong, offers featured courses such as social work theories, social work for the elderly and the disabled, calligraphy, folk music and Chinese tea cultural, etc. Since its establishment, the seminary has produced nearly two thousand graduates, most of whom have returned to their original churches in Shandong to serve.

The current president of the seminary is Rev. Gao Ming. The faculty includes more than 40 full-time teachers and 15 visiting and part-time teachers. The school also invites senior pastors to teach practical courses to the students.

Symposiums and seminars are held on the platform of the Qilu Theological Research Center. Research is focused on the Sinicization of Christianity, especially the combination of Qilu culture and Christianity, which includes three aspects: First, returning to the textual basis of the Bible. Second, reflecting on the complete history of the Church of more than 2,000 years and finding ways to run the Shandong churches well. Third, preaching Jesus through local Qilu culture to help people face the ups and downs of life.

In the spirit of serving the society, the school actively runs nursing homes and elderly services, and donates money and materials to disaster areas. At the same time, they also actively carry out international cooperation, inviting foreign friends to give lectures at the school and jointly explore the practice of Sinicization of Christianity in Shandong.

The school library has a collection of more than 40,000 books, nearly 100 journals and newspapers, and more than 1,500 electronic materials.

Campus address: Sushan Road, Meili Lake Development Zone, Huaiyin District, Jinan City, Shandong Province, China.

== See also ==
- List of Protestant theological seminaries in China
- East China Theological Seminary
- China Christian Council
