= Northeast Theological Seminary =

The Northeast Theological Seminary, or Dongbei Theological Seminary (simplified Chinese: 东北神学院; traditional Chinese: 東北神學院; pinyin: Dōngběi Shénxuéyuàn), is located in Shenyang of China and has a history of more than 100 years. It is the Christian educational hub for Northeast China, including the three provinces of Heilongjiang, Jilin and Liaoning.

== History ==
In 1884, Rev. Dr. John Ross, a missionary from the United Presbyterian Church in Scotland, founded a preacher training class in Shenyang to cultivate local clergy.

In 1894, the Guandong Presbyterian Church established a four-year advanced theology class based on the original preacher training class, with intensive study for one month each year.

In 1898, the seminary was officially established in Shenyang, with John Ross as the president. The first class of students includes 13 graduates from the junior training class.

In 1914, the seminary built a new campus in Shenhe District, Shenyang City, covering an area of more than 10,000 square meters.

After the founding of the People's Republic of China in 1949, the foreign missionaries returned to their motherlands. In 1951, the Northeastern Conference of the Chinese Christian Church joined the Three-Self Church. Sun Pengxi, chairman of the conference, was elected president of the seminary in 1952.

In 1953, Northeast Theological Seminary merged into Yenching Union Theological Seminary in Beijing.

During the Cultural Revolution (1966 to 1976), the seminary was closed.

In September 1982, Northeast Theological Seminary resumed teaching. The school was located in the female dormitory of the former seminary, with a building area of only 442 square meters. The first class enrolled 47 students.

In 1993, the seminary was demolished and an eight-story college building was re-built near the original site. It was put into use in 1996.

In 2009, the seminary began off-site reconstruction at its current site in the beautiful Qipanshan International Scenery and Tourism Development Zone. In 2012, the first phase of the project (teaching building, dormitory building, and gymnasium) was completed and put into use. The Panshi International Church (Rock Church) was built in 2015. Later, the projects including campus landscape construction, canteen renovation, library relocation, and campus playground renovation were completed. The campus covers a total area of more than 30,000 square meters.

== Current situation ==
The main mission of the seminary is to cultivate outstanding pastoral talents for the region of Northeast China (including the three provinces of Heilongjiang, Jilin and Liaoning). The graduates are supposed to love both the Christian religion and their motherland.

The college currently has four-year undergraduate classes, three-year sacred music classes, and two-year technical secondary school classes. The curriculum consists of both theological courses and common required courses. The current president of Northeast Theological Seminary is Elder Shi Aijun.

There are 23 full-time teachers. From its resumption in 1982 to 2022, the seminary has produced approximately 2,000 graduates, including approximately 1,650 undergraduate and junior college students. In 2024, a total of 142 undergraduate and technical secondary school students graduated successfully.

The school library has a collection of about 31,000 books in both Chinese and English, and covers an area of 1,200 square meters.

The school journal of the college is Northeast Theological Journal (Chinese: 东北神学志), which has been published for 9 issues. When it was founded in 1983, the journal was titled Lilium (百合花).

== Address ==
Northeast Theological Seminary is located at No. 109, Forest Road, Hunnan New District, Shenyang City, Liaoning Province.

== See also ==
- List of Protestant theological seminaries in China
- Northeastern Seminary (US)
