= Haixia Olympic Center =

Sports venue in Fuzhou, Fujian, China

Fuzhou Strait Olympic Sports Center
- 福州海峡奥林匹克体育中心
- Haixia Olympic Center
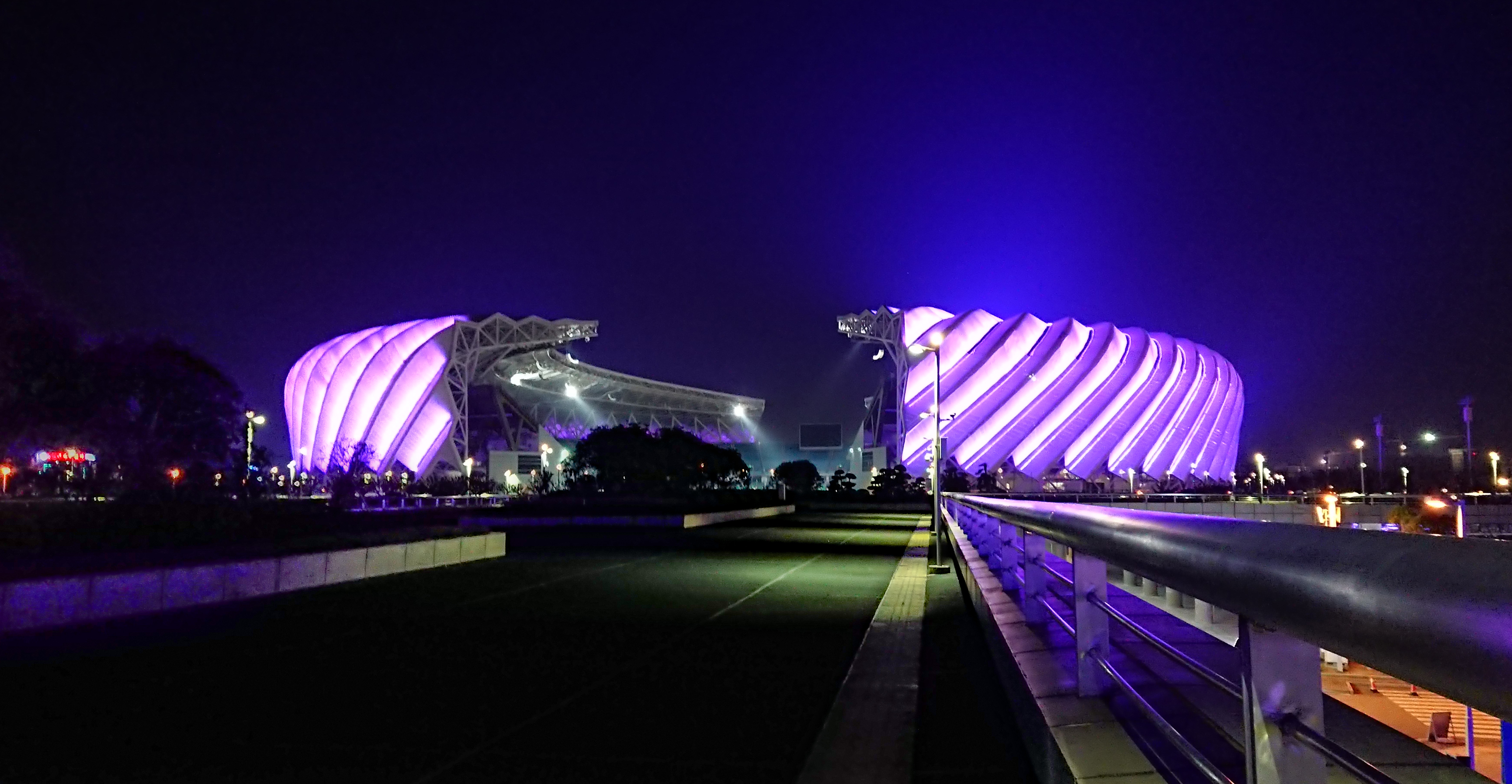
- Interactive map of Fuzhou Strait Olympic Sports Center
- Location: Intersection of Dongling Rd & Fuwan Rd, Cangshan District, Fuzhou, Fujian, China
- Coordinates: 26°01′13.1″N 119°16′46.8″E
- Capacity: 59,562

Construction
- Groundbreaking: December 23, 2010
- Opened: 2015
- Cost: $470 million USD

The Fuzhou Strait Olympic Sports Center (Chinese: 福州海峡奥林匹克体育中心; pinyin: Fúzhōu Hǎixiá Àolínpǐkè Tǐyù Zhōngxīn), also known as the Haixia Olympic Center or Strait Olympic Center (Chinese: 海峡奥体; pinyin: Hǎixiá Ào-Tǐ) is a sports complex with a multi-purpose stadium in Cangshan District in the south of Fuzhou, China.

Opened in 2015, the main stadium is designed for a capacity of 59,562 spectators. The complex comprises an indoor arena with a capacity of 12,980 spectators, an aquatics center with a capacity of 3,978 spectators and a tennis stadium with a capacity of 3,152 spectators. Additionally, a municipal sports school will also be built within the complex grounds featuring training halls for indoor sports, swimming pools, a shooting range, an archery field and a beach volleyball stadium.

== Transport ==
=== Bus ===
- Fujian Theological Seminary (Doumen, Fuwan Road) (福湾斗门): 18, 81, 126, 302, 351, 901
- Aoti Road Bus Station (奥体路公交总站): 197
- Jianxin South Road (建新南路): 11, 47, 138, 311, 337
- Strait Olympic Center Bus Terminal (海峡奥体公交枢纽站): 11, 148, 156, 329, 330

=== Metro ===
5 ：

- Xiajing (霞镜; Xiájìng zhàn),
- Dongling (东岭站; Dōnglǐng zhàn).
