= Shenyang Botanical Garden =

Botanical garden in Shenyang, China

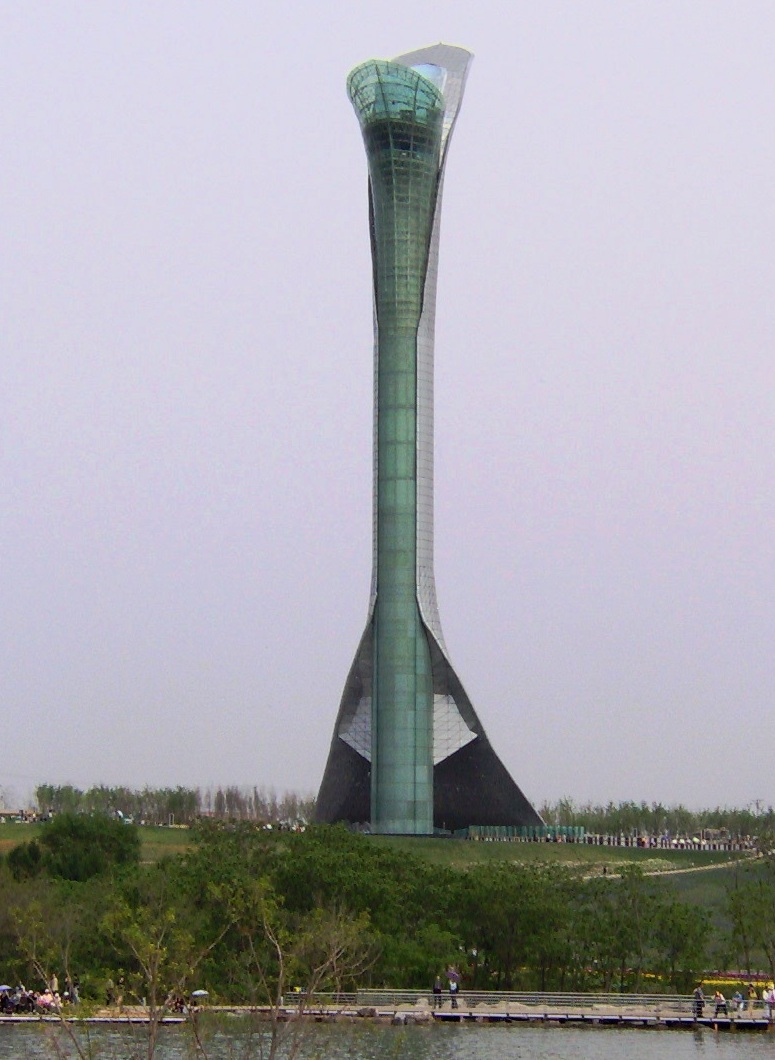
- The symbol tower of the Shenyang Botanical Garden is intended to look like a flower about to blossom.

- Location within Liaoning Location within China
- Type: Urban park
- Location: Shenyang City, Liaoning, China
- Coordinates: 41°51′31″N 123°38′38″E
- Created: 1959
- Status: Open all year

The Shenyang Botanical Garden (Chinese: 沈阳市植物园), also known as "Shenyang World Expo Garden" (Chinese: 沈阳世博园), is located in Qipanshan Tourism Development Zone, in the eastern suburb of Shenyang City, Liaoning, China. It was the site of the 2006 China Shenyang World Horticultural Exposition, and is a 5A Tourist Attraction of China.

The Shenyang Botanical Garden was founded in February 1959.

== History ==
- In February 1959, the Shenyang Botanical Garden was established.
- From its establishment to the 1970s, the Shenyang Botanical Garden had little development.
- Since the late 1980s, the construction of the Shenyang Botanical Garden has developed rapidly and has become a popular scenic spot.
- In April 2002, the Shenyang Municipal Government classified the Shenyang Botanical Garden from the Shenyang Construction Administration Bureau as the Shenyang Qipanshan Development Zone Administrative Committee.
- In July 2004, the Shenyang Botanical Garden was awarded the titles of the 4A tourist attraction and then the 5A tourist attraction.
- From May 1 to October 31, 2006, the Shenyang Botanical Garden hosted the 2006 Shenyang World Horticultural Exposition.

== See also ==
- Tourist attractions of Shenyang
