= Qi–Lu culture =

Culture in Shandong

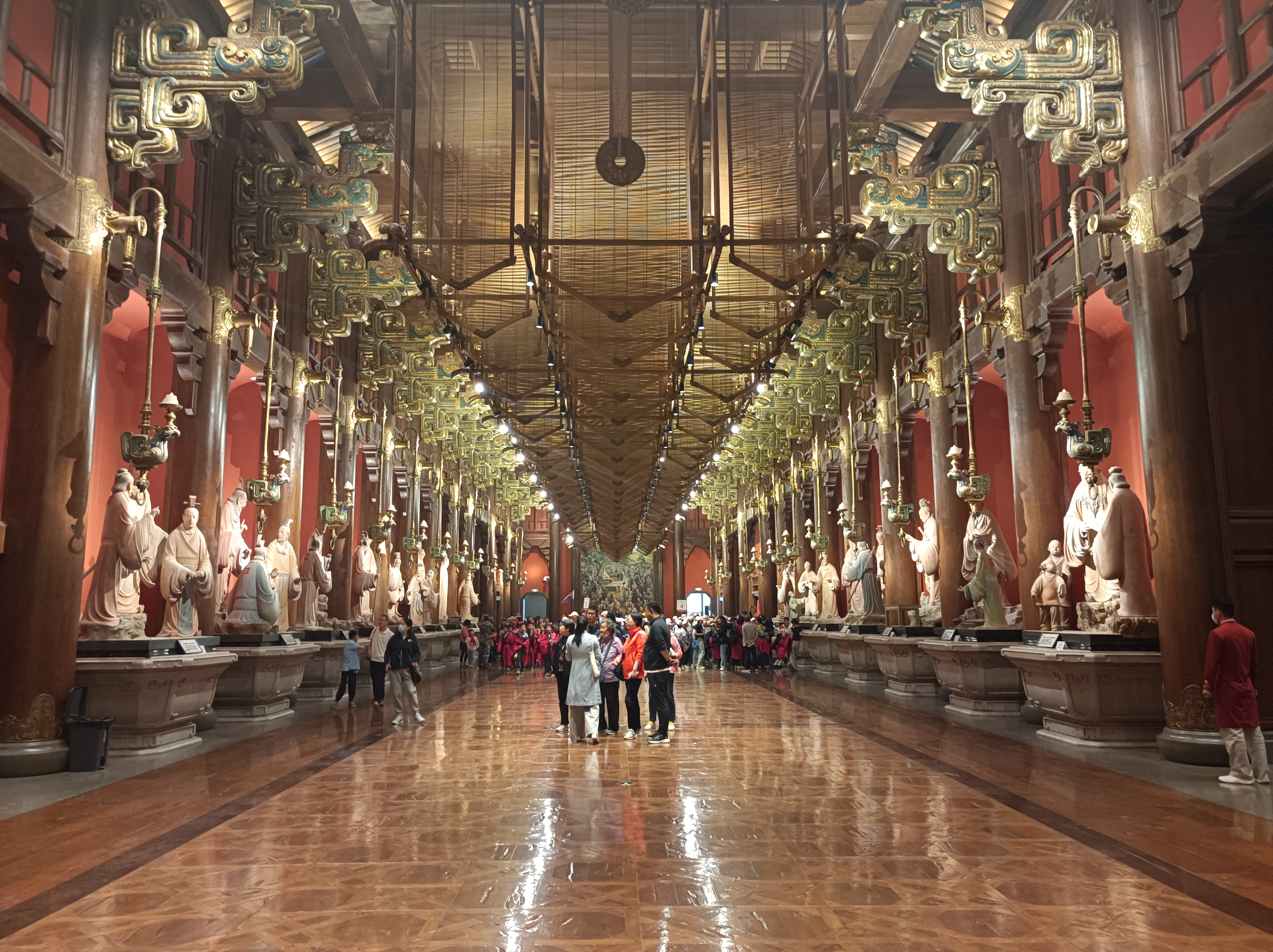
The Shrine of Mount Ni in Qufu, honoring Confucius and his disciplines.

Qi–Lu culture (simplified Chinese: 齐鲁文化; traditional Chinese: 齊魯文化; pinyin: Qílǔ wénhuà), also known as Haidai culture (Chinese: 海岱文化; pinyin: Hǎidài wénhuà), is a regional culture that originated and developed in Shandong Province, China. The Qi–Lu Cultural District is centered around the Taiyi Mountains and encompasses the region east of the Beijing-Hangzhou Grand Canal in present-day Shandong Province, northern Jiangsu Province, and the Liaodong Peninsula. This cultural area aligns with the Jiaoliao Mandarin District and the Jilu Mandarin Districts within Shandong Province.

To the west, it is bordered by the Grand Canal and the Central Plains Culture, while to the south, it is adjacent to the Jianghuai Culture in the Jianghuai Mandarin District. Qilu culture can be further divided into two subregions: "Western Lu culture" and "Jiaodong culture."

== Composition ==
Qi–Lu culture is deeply connected to Guan Zhong and Confucius. Their influence played a crucial role in shaping its origins, laying a strong foundation for the subsequent flourishing of Qilu culture.

=== Qi culture ===
State of Qi is located in the northeast part of Shandong, with capital in Linzi, Zibo. Guan Zhong was a statesman and philosopher from the state of Qi, as well as a prominent representative of Legalism during the Spring and Autumn Period. His key ideas were later compiled and recorded in the book Guanzi by subsequent generations.

=== Lu culture ===
State of Lu was located in the southwest part of Shandong, with capital in Qufu, Jining. Confucius, an educator and philosopher from the state of Lu, was the founder of Confucianism. His teachings on benevolence, righteousness, propriety, wisdom, and trust had a profound and lasting impact.

=== Area ===
The Qi–Lu Cultural District is centered around the Taiyi Mountains, and its scope roughly includes the area east of the Beijing-Hangzhou Grand Canal in present-day Shandong Province, northern Jiangsu Province, and the Liaodong Peninsula. It corresponds to the Jiaoliao Mandarin District as well as the Hebei and Shandong Mandarin Districts in Shandong Province.

To the west, it is bounded by the Grand Canal and the Central Plains Culture; to the south, it is adjacent to the Jianghuai Culture in the Jianghuai Mandarin District. To the north, it stretches across the Bohai Strait, and in the Liaodong Peninsula, it borders the Northeastern Culture in the Northeast Mandarin District.

== History ==
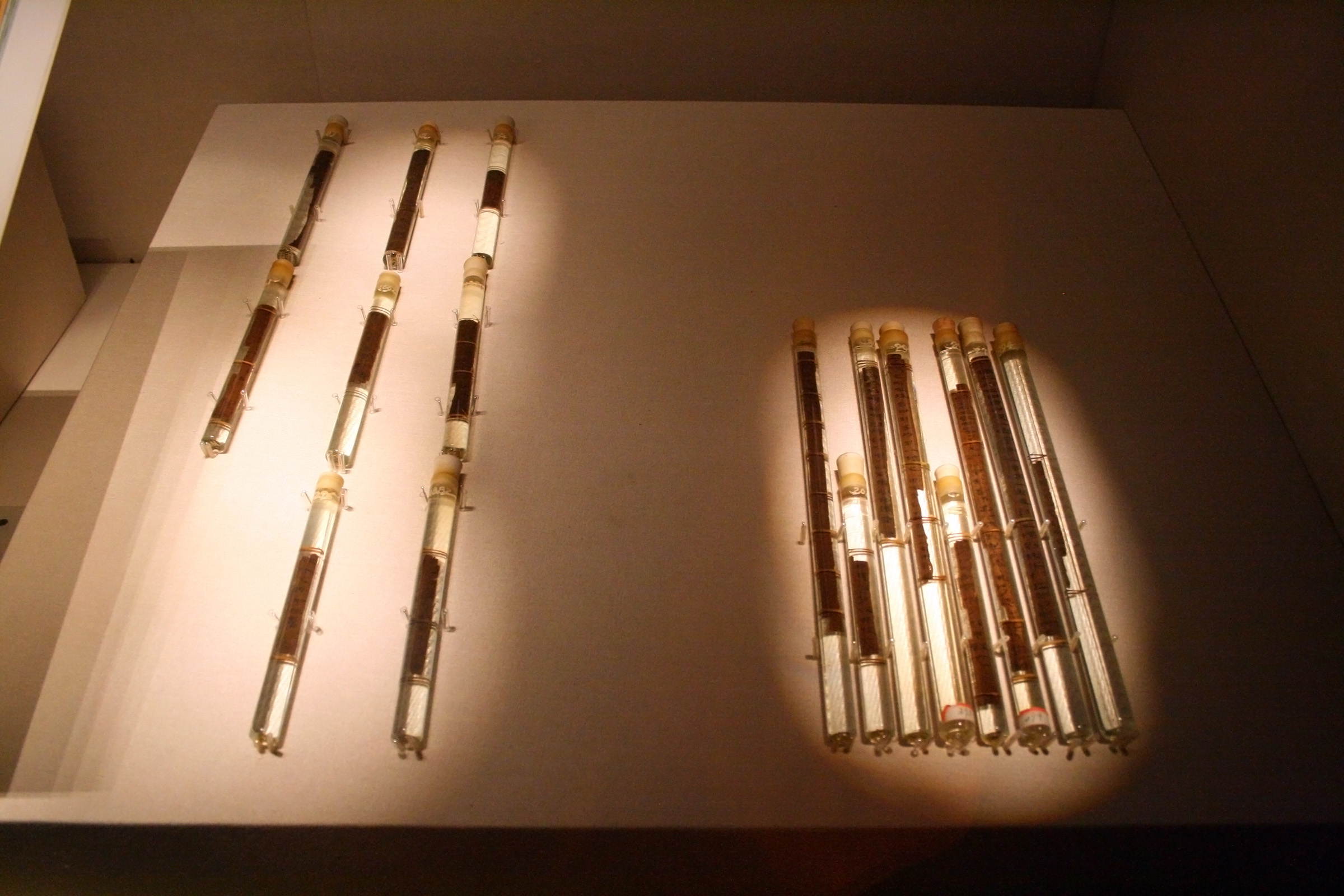
Bamboo slips of "Sun Tzu's Art of War " unearthed from Yinqueshan Han Tomb

The prehistoric culture of Shandong, known as Dongyi culture, is one of the oldest civilizations in China. The characters of the Dongyi people are believed to be one of the important sources of oracle bone inscriptions from the Shang dynasty. Characters such as "Dan," "Jin," "Huang," "Feng," "Jiu," and "Pai" are still in use today.

According to Chinese classics, the Dongyi people invented the bow and arrow and possessed advanced pottery-making technology. They were also the first tribe in China to use copper and iron. Research on Longshan culture suggests that the Dongyi people were the inventors of rituals, signifying the development of their social hierarchy and the establishment of early states.

Chinese archaeologist Yu Weichao has noted that "if it were not for the great flood more than 4,000 years ago, the Dongyi people might have established China’s earliest dynasty."

From the founding of the states of Qi and Lu in the early Western Zhou dynasty to the Spring and Autumn Period, the Qi culture (Jiaodong culture) and Lu culture (Western Lu culture) gradually took shape. Qi culture was primarily influenced by Dongyi culture, with Zhou culture as a secondary influence, whereas Lu culture was predominantly shaped by Zhou culture, supplemented by elements of Dongyi culture.

Qi culture was characterized by its utilitarian and rational approach, which led to the emergence of numerous intellectual traditions and figures. These included military strategists such as Sun Wu and Sun Bin, astronomers like Gan De and Zou Yan, medical scientists like Bian Que, logicians like Gongsun Long, and Yin-Yang school represented by Zou Yan. Additionally, it fostered Taoists, renowned scholars, legalists, peasants, politicians, and other pragmatic schools of thought.

In contrast, Lu culture emphasized etiquette and feudalism, with Confucianism advocating for the restoration of feudal hierarchies and societal order. However, opposing schools of thought also arose, such as Mohism, which promoted logic and stood in opposition to Confucian ideals.

During the Warring States Period, Qi culture began to dominate over Lu culture, with Legalism and Mohism playing a significant role in shaping its intellectual landscape.

During the Han dynasty, Emperor Wu officially recognized the Confucian system. Following the policy of "deposing hundreds of schools of thought and respecting Confucianism alone," Confucianism became the cornerstone of China's social framework and values.

At the end of the Eastern Han dynasty, two prominent Confucian scholars, He Xiu and Zheng Xuan, emerged from Shandong. During the Eastern Jin and Southern dynasties, many renowned noble families who resettled south of the Yangtze River, such as the Langya Wang family, the Lanling Xiao family, the Gaoping Xi family, the Langya Yan family, and the Taiyang family, originated from the Qilu region.

After the Wei and Jin dynasties, however, Qilu culture gradually lost its independence.

== Feature ==
=== Literature ===
In August 2011, Mo Yan's novel Frog won the 8th Mao Dun Literature Award. On 11 October 2012, he was awarded the Nobel Prize in Literature for his "fusion of folk tales, history, and contemporary times with hallucinatory realism," becoming the first writer from the People's Republic of China to receive this honor.

=== Art ===
Representative works of Shandong folk songs include Liang Fu Yin from the Han dynasty, Bai Xue Yiyin from the Qing dynasty, and the modern Yimeng Mountain Minor. Local folk art forms feature Shandong Bangzi, Shandong Kuaishu, and Lu opera.

=== Religion ===
The main religions currently practiced in Shandong Province are Buddhism, Taoism, Islam, Catholicism, and Christianity (Protestantism).

Buddhism and Taoism have a history of over a thousand years in Shandong. Islam began to develop in the region after Hui Muslims migrated there in the 13th century. Catholicism and Christianity spread rapidly, primarily following the Opium War.

In 1990, Shandong Province had 1.2 million religious believers, 3,040 religious activity sites, and 2,578 religious personnel.

=== Language ===
The Shandong dialect classification by Qian Zengyi and Li Rong.

Eastern District		West District	
Donglai District	Dongwei District	Xiqi District	Xilu District
Jiaoliao Mandarin		Jilu Mandarin	Central Plains Mandarin

The Shandong region features diverse dialects, with variations in pronunciation, vocabulary, and grammar. Scholars such as Qian Zengyi classified the Shandong dialect into two major areas and four sub-districts, while Li Rong divided it into three areas: Jilu Mandarin, Jiaoliao Mandarin, and Central Plains Mandarin.

The Shandong dialect spoken by Hou Baolin belongs to Jiaoliao Mandarin, whereas the Shandong dialect used in Shandong Kuaishu falls under Hebei-Shandong Mandarin. The Mandarin dialects of Hebei and Shandong include subcategories such as the Liaotai group (e.g., Jinan dialect), and the Huang Le group (e.g., Wudi dialect). The Central Plains Mandarin dialects include the Jining and Zaozhuang dialects.

The Jiaodong dialect is more complex and closely resembles the Dalian and Dandong dialects of Liaoning. It belongs to Jiaoliao Mandarin, which is the most distinct dialect group from standard Mandarin in East China. Jiaoliao Mandarin includes the Denglian, Qinglai, and Yingtong subgroups, with approximately 30 million speakers. The Qinglai subgroup is further divided into four smaller areas: the Qingdao area, Qingqu area, Laichang area, and Juzhao area.

=== Folk customs ===
Shandong folk customs are divided into two styles: Qi and Lu. Qi customs reflect the cultural traditions of Dongyi, showing less influence from clan structures and Zhou rituals, with some elements of a developing commodity economy. Lu customs, on the other hand, were shaped by Zhou rites, focusing more on structured practices and agricultural life.

Cultural characteristics vary across the region. The Shandong Plain is known for its farming culture, with Weifang kites and Yangjiabu New Year paintings being prominent examples.

The Jiaodong coastal area features fishing customs that are lively and straightforward.

The western Shandong region is notable for its strong traditions and its association with Confucius and Mencius.

=== Diet ===
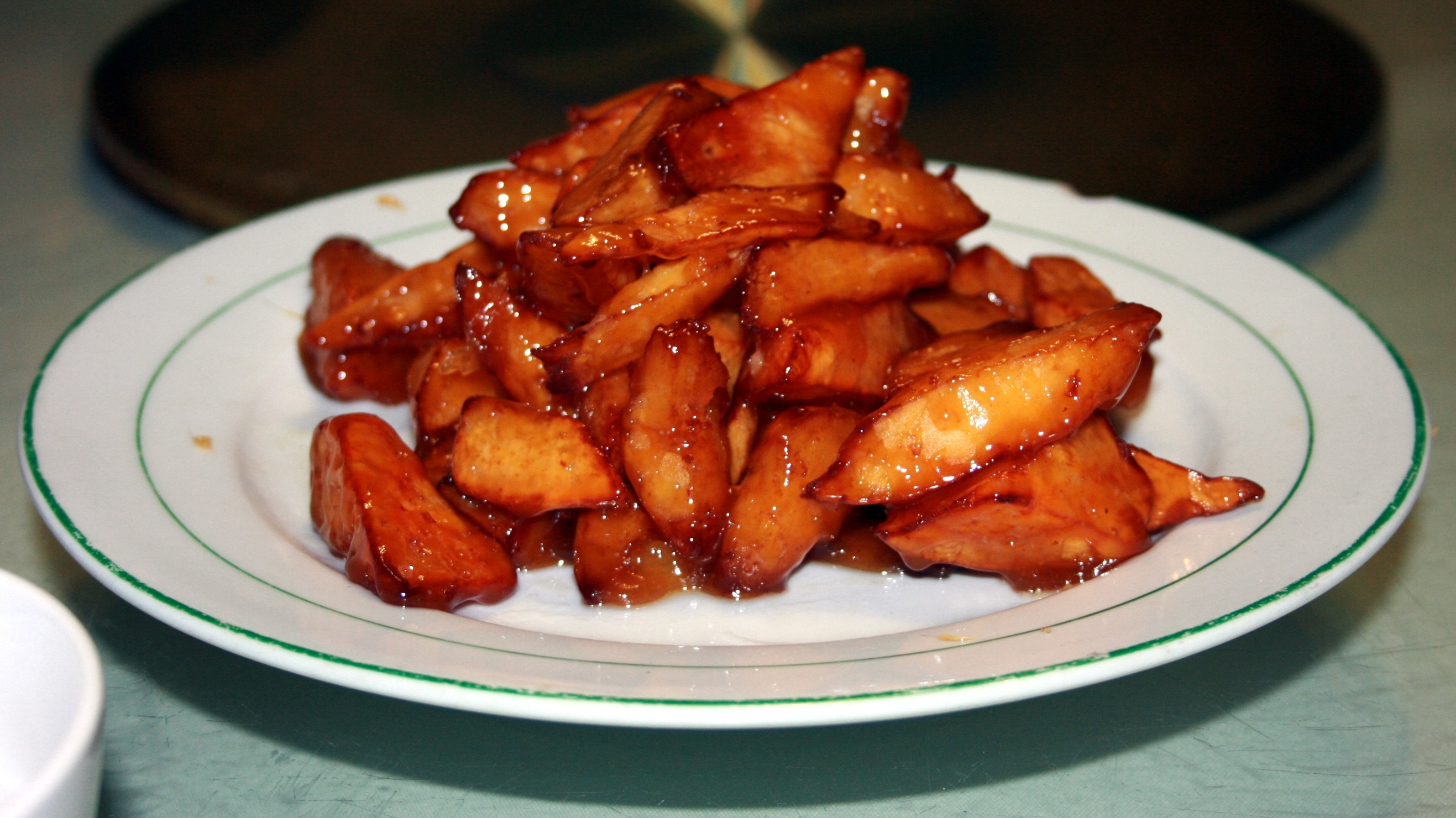
Candied sweet potatoes

Shandong cuisine ranks first among the four major cuisines in China and has been famous since the Spring and Autumn period. After the Song dynasty, it became a representative of northern cuisine. During the Ming and Qing dynasties, Shandong cuisine was the mainstay of royal cuisine and became very popular in Beijing, Tianjin, Hebei, and Northeast China, having a significant impact.

Shandong cuisine can be divided into three main styles: Jinan cuisine, Jiaodong cuisine, and Kongfu cuisine. Jinan cuisine is known for its expertise in roasting, deep-frying, and stir-frying, with a stronger, richer flavor. Jiaodong cuisine, originating from coastal areas such as Fushan, Yantai, and Qingdao, specializes in seafood, emphasizing fresh, tender, and light flavors that focus on the natural taste of the ingredients. Kongfu cuisine is renowned worldwide for its exquisite ingredients, fine preparation, unique style, and distinctive flavor.

Traditional Shandong dishes include sweet and sour Yellow River carp, roasted sea cucumber with green onion, Mushu meat, grilled abalone in its shell, nine-turn large intestine, fried lotus, Jinan roast duck, carrot sweet potato, and Sixi meatballs. Additionally, "Dezhou Braised Chicken Production Technique" and "Longkou Vermicelli Traditional Handmade Production Technique" are recognized as national intangible cultural heritages.

Shandong is also renowned for its wine culture and emphasis on etiquette. In a formal setting, the person with the highest rank in the guest party is called the "host" and sits directly opposite the door. To the right of the host sits the "guest of honor," the highest-ranking guest, while the "deputy guest of honor" sits to the left. The "secondary waiter" sits opposite the main waiter, with their back to the door, and is primarily responsible for encouraging guests to drink. Serving food, pouring tea, and pouring wine all begin with the guest of honor.

Shandong's wine culture has a long history. The Yantai Changyu Winemaking Company, founded by Qing dynasty industrialist Zhang Bishi in 1892, is now the largest wine producer in China and Asia, and the tenth-largest wine producer in the world. The company produces four wine series: wine, brandy, champagne, and health wine, with hundreds of products. Wine estates and wine culture museums have become popular destinations for cultural tourism, leisure, and sightseeing.

=== Festival ===
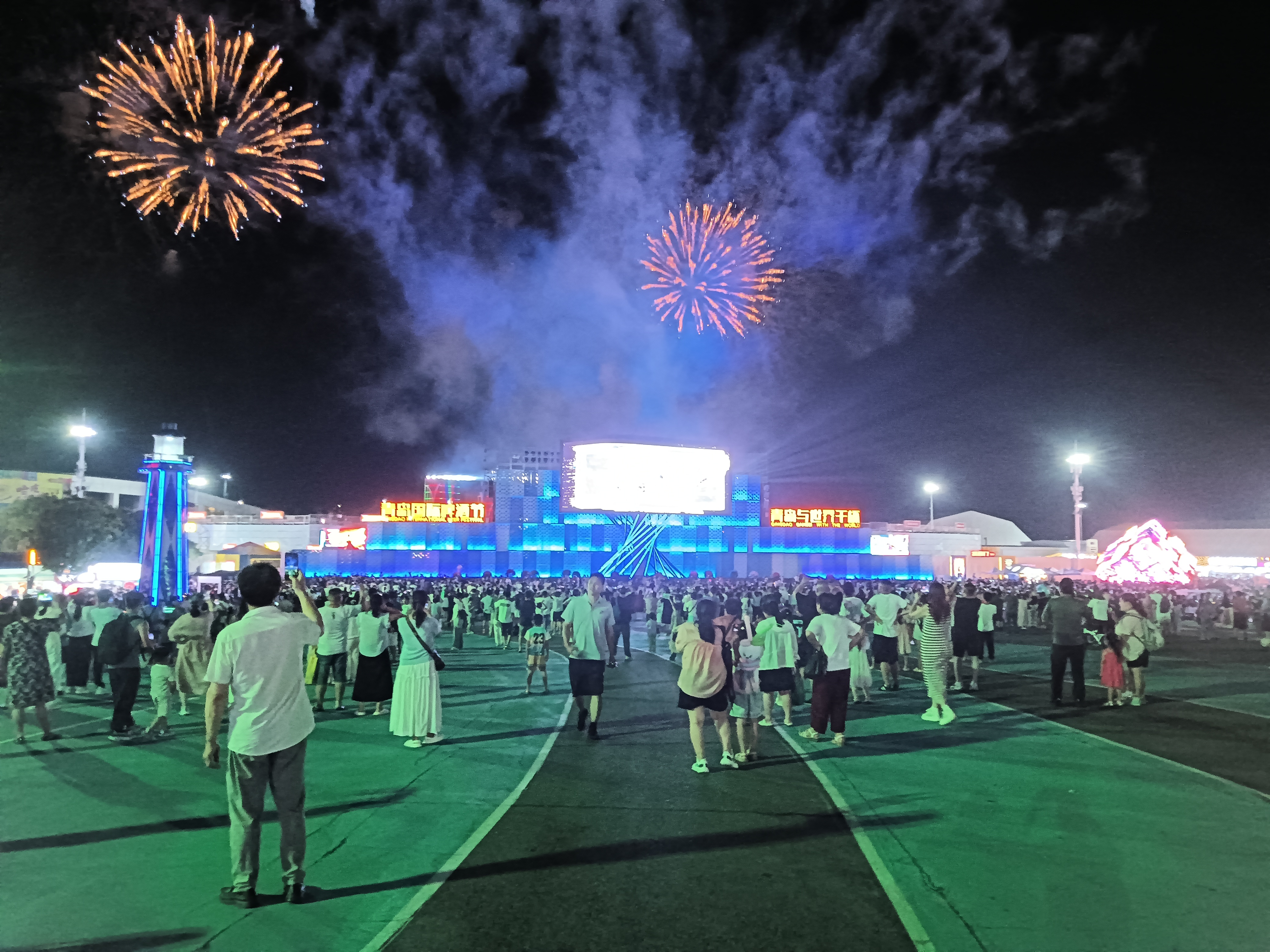
The 35th Qingdao International Beer Festival, 2025

Festivals in Shandong are divided into traditional festivals and emerging festivals. Most emerging festivals are national events, such as New Year's Day, Women's Day, and Arbor Day. Since the reform and opening up, many new festivals and conferences have been established throughout Shandong, collectively referred to as "emerging festivals." These festivals aim to promote the local economy and tourism and include the Confucius Cultural Festival, Rongcheng Fishermen's Festival, Qingdao International Beer Festival, Zibo Ceramics Glaze Art Festival, and various cultural and art festivals.

=== Education ===
Education system: Shandong's education system follows China's national education policy, which includes nine-year compulsory education, high school education, higher education, and other levels of education.

Basic education: Shandong Province places a strong emphasis on basic education, including primary and junior high school education. The school system is extensive, offering students a comprehensive education across various subjects.

Senior high school education: The level of senior high school education in Shandong Province is relatively high, with some renowned high schools offering high-quality liberal arts and science courses. High school education is a crucial stage in preparing students for university entrance.

Higher Education: Shandong Province is home to many renowned universities and higher education institutions, with Shandong University, China Ocean University, and Qingdao University being notable representatives. These universities are well-regarded both domestically and internationally, attracting students from across China and abroad.

Scientific research and innovation: Shandong Province has made significant achievements in scientific research and innovation, attracting a large number of research talents. Universities and research institutions in the province actively participate in national and local scientific research projects, contributing to the advancement of scientific and technological innovation and development.

Education reform: Shandong Province is continuously implementing education reforms to adapt to changes in the social economy and educational needs. These efforts include improving the quality of education, promoting the use of information technology in education, and strengthening teacher training.

== Cultural heritage ==
Cultural relics unearthed in Shandong that are prohibited from being exhibited abroad
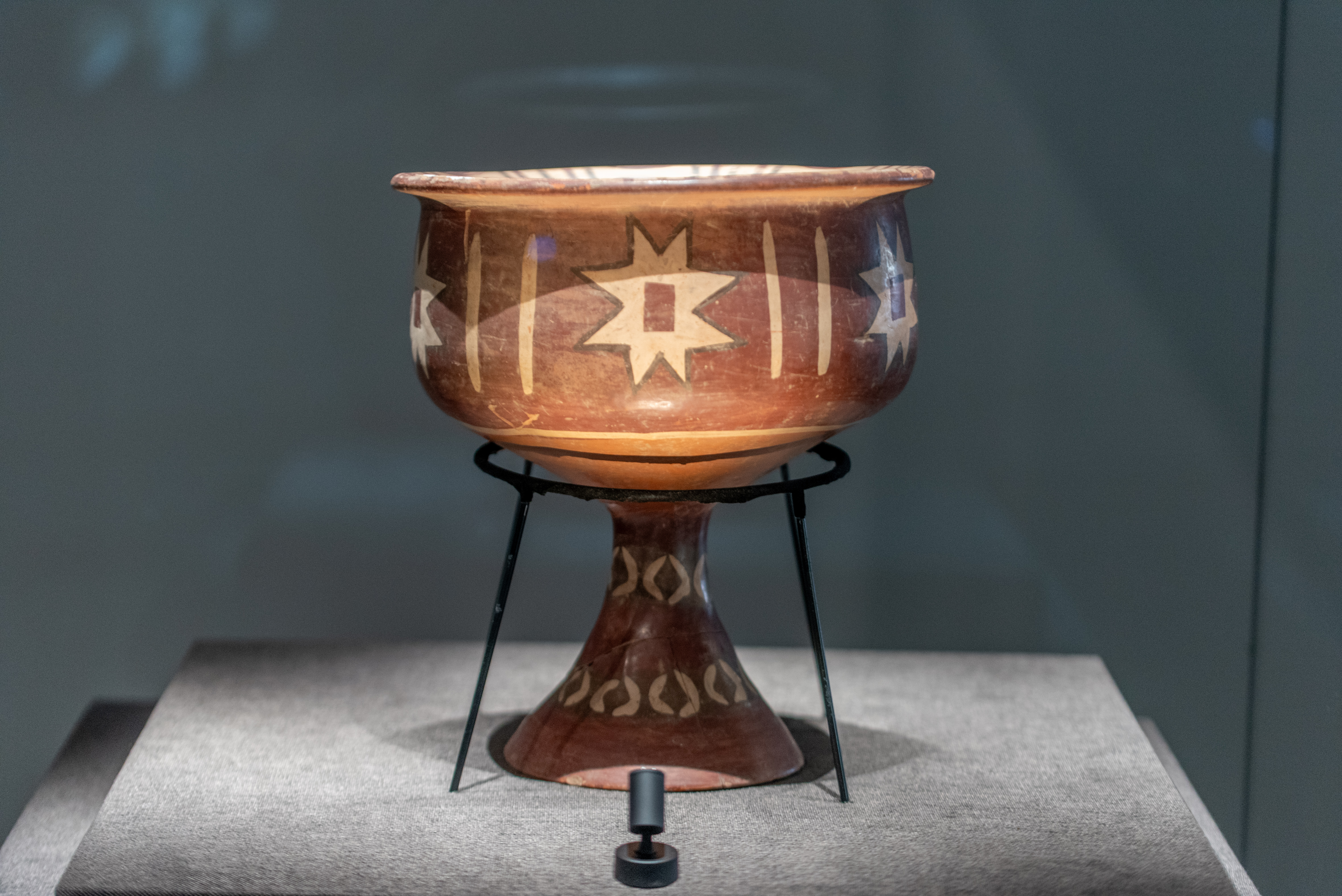
Dawenkou culture painted pottery eight-pointed star pattern bean (typical Dawenkou culture colored pottery）

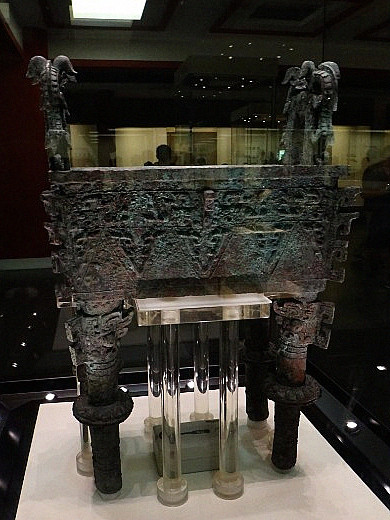
Western Zhou dynasty taibaoding (typical representatives of Shang and Zhou bronzes)

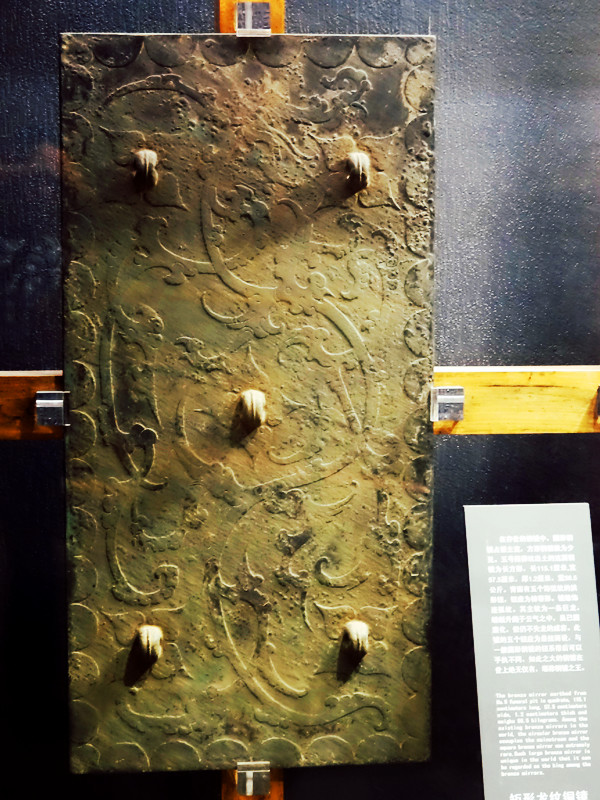
Bronze Square Mirror from the Tomb of King Qi (bronze mirror unearthed from the tomb of the princes of the Western Han dynasty)

== Travel ==
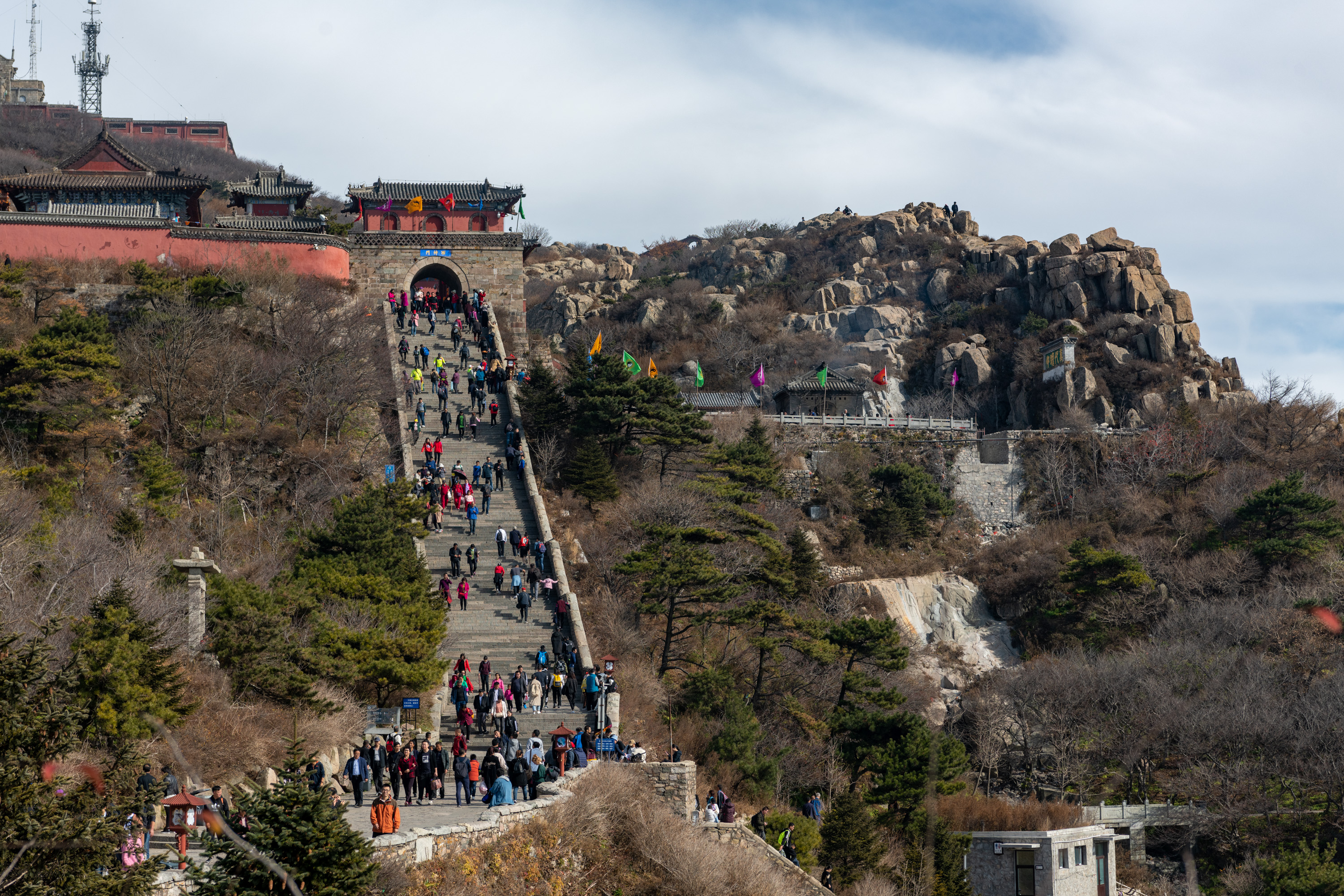
Mount Tai is the first scenic spot in China to be rated as a World Heritage Site .

As of December 2015, Shandong had 446 national-level tourism resources. These included 10 historical and cultural cities, 196 key cultural relics protection units, 5 national scenic spots, 7 national nature reserves, 42 national forest parks, 13 national geological parks, and 173 national intangible cultural heritage items. Additionally, there were 783 A-level scenic spots in the province, including 9 5A-level scenic spots. The list is as follows:

- 6 National Key Scenic Spots: Mount Tai, Mount Laoshan, Jiaodong Peninsula Coastal Area, Boshan, Qingzhou, Qianfo Mountain
- 7 National Nature Reserves: Shanwang Paleontological Fossils, Changdao, Yellow River delta, Jimo Mashan, Binzhou Shell Island and Wetland, Rongcheng Whooper Swan, Kunyu Mountain
- 10 National Historical and Cultural Cities: Qufu, Jinan, Qingdao, Liaocheng, Zoucheng, Linzi, Tai'an, Yantai, Penglai, Qingzhou
  - Provincial Historical and Cultural Cities: Jining, Zibo, Penglai, Weifang, Linyi, Linqing, Juxian, Yantai, Yicheng, Taierzhuang, Tengzhou, Zaozhuang
- 5 Famous Historical and Cultural Villages in China: Zhujiayu Village (Guanzhuang Township, Zhangqiu District, Jinan City), Dongchudao Village (Ningjin Street, Rongcheng City), Xiongyasuo Village (Tianheng Town, Jimo District, Qingdao City), Lijia Village (Wangcun Town, Zhoucun District, Zibo City), Tuancun and Gaojiazhuangzi Village (Xinzhuang Town, Zhaoyuan City)
- 42 National Forest Parks: Laoshan, Baodugu, Taishan, Lashan, etc.
- 196 National Key Cultural Relics Protection Units (list)
- 397 Provincial-level Cultural Relics Protection Units (list)

== Figures ==
- Confucius: The founder of Yixue and Confucianism, Confucius is one of the most influential philosophers in Chinese history.
- Sun Wu: A famous military strategist in ancient China, later generations respectfully call him Sun Tzu, the Sage of War.
- Lu Ban: A renowned craftsman from the late Spring and Autumn period, he was revered by later generations as the master craftsman of China.
- Wang Xizhi: A Chinese calligrapher from the Eastern Jin dynasty, known as the Sage of Calligraphy.
- Qin Qiong: A native of Licheng, Qizhou (now Jinan, Shandong) during the Tang dynasty. He was a founding general of the Tang dynasty, one of the twenty-four heroes of Lingyan Pavilion, and a traditional door god alongside Yuchi Gong.
