= Henan Theological Seminary =

Theological school in Henan, China

Henan Theological Seminary (simplified Chinese: 河南神学院; traditional Chinese: 河南神學院; pinyin: Hénán Shénxuéyuàn) is a theological higher education institution in Henan, a province with nearly 100 million people and the largest Christian population in China. It is located in Zhengzhou, the capital city, and sponsored by the Christian Council of Henan Province. The school has developed from the one-year "Henan Province Christian Theological Training Center" when it was founded in 1989 to the three-year "Henan Bible School" and then to the current four-year undergraduate college, cultivating nearly 3,000 graduates of BA students and pastoral trainees, who mostly serve in the churches across Henan.

== History ==
In 1989, the Henan Provincial Christian Council established the one-year "Henan Christian Theological Training Center" in a small church courtyard on Xinglong Street, Luoyang City. There was only one class of 80 students with a study program of one year.

In 1993, the training center was moved to Songzhai Village in the northern suburbs of Zhengzhou City, the provincial capital. A small two-story building of 620 square meters was built on the homestead of Sister Yang, a Christian, to run the school, enrolling 130 students in two classes. The conditions were quite simple.

In 1999, the school acquired 15 mu of land in Zhengzhou Economic Development Zone and started construction of a new campus.

In July 2000, with the help and hard prayers of many parties, the first phase of the seminary was successfully completed. It includes teaching buildings, student dormitories, the church, and the dining hall, covering an area of 5,894 square meters and costing nearly 5 million yuan. In the same year, the school moved to the new campus, the schooling system was changed to two years, and enrollment was open to the whole province. There were 200 students in three classes at the school.

In 2006, the seminary opened two branches in the cities of Xuchang and Jiaozuo, with 100 students each. A faculty apartment building was also built that same year, allowing faculty to move out of the student dining hall.

In 2010, the school was upgraded to "Henan Bible School", a three-year college.

In 2017, the school was further upgraded to "Henan Theological Seminary", a four-year undergraduate institution.

== Offerings ==
In addition to its four-year undergraduate program, the school also trains in-service pastoral staff. There are both common courses and professional theological courses. The theology courses include systematic theology, biblical theology, historical theology, practical theology, etc. And computer courses and musical instrument courses (including erhu, guzheng, piano, etc.) are also available for enhancement of practical skills. There are currently more than 260 students on campus. Since its establishment, the seminary has cultivated nearly 3,000 graduates, who mostly serve in the churches across Henan.

The current president of the seminary is Rev. Tang Weimin. The faculty includes 16 full-time teachers and 10 part-time teachers.

There are currently about 50,000 books and another 50,000 ebooks in its library.

== See also ==
- List of Protestant theological seminaries in China
- Zhongnan Theological Seminary
