= List of Protestant theological seminaries in China =

This is a list of Protestant theological seminaries in the People's Republic of China which presently includes those in mainland China. Seminaries in Hong Kong and Macao, as well as training centers, are not yet included.

See also related laws that have been published by the State Administration for Religious Affairs.

== Seminaries ==
=== Mainland China ===
A list of the officially registered undergraduate theological seminaries in mainland China:

- Anhui Theological Seminary (Chinese: 安徽神学院)

Established in 1986 in Hefei. It is managed by the TSPM/CC of Anhui Province.

- Fujian Theological Seminary (Chinese: 福建神学院)

Established in 1983 in Fuzhou. It is managed by the TSPM/CC of Fujian Province.

- Guangdong Union Theological Seminary (Chinese: 广东协和神学院)

Established in 1914 in Guangzhou as the Canton Theological Seminary, it was later made an affiliate college of Lingnan University. It was closed in 1960 and re-established in 1986. It is managed by the TSPM/CC of Guangdong Province.

- Heilongjiang Theological Seminary (Chinese: 黑龙江神学院)

Established in 1996 in Harbin as the Heilongjiang Protestant Bible School, it was upgraded to junior college status in 2009 and renamed the Heilongjiang Bible College. In 2011, it started cooperative teaching with the Harbin Protestant Bible School and in 2012, both schools were merged and the institute upgraded to an undergraduate school bearing the current name. It is managed by the TSPM/CC of Heilongjiang Province.

- Henan Theological Seminary (Chinese: 河南神学院)

Established in 1989 in Luoyang as the Henan Christian Theological Training Centre, it was moved to Zhengzhou in 1993. In 2009, it was granted approval to operate as a three-year Bible college. In 2017, the school was further upgraded to "Henan Theological Seminary", a four-year undergraduate institution. It is managed by the TSPM/CC of Henan Province.

- Huadong Theological Seminary (Chinese: 华东神学院)

Established in 1985 in Shanghai, it is jointly managed by the provincial TSPM/CCs of Shandong, Zhejiang, Jiangxi, Fujian, and Shanghai.

- Jiangsu Theological Seminary (Chinese: 江苏神学院)

Established in 1998 in Nanjing. It is managed by the TSPM/CC of Jiangsu Province.

- Jinling Union Theological Seminary also known as Nanjing Union Theological Seminary (Chinese: 金陵协和神学院)

Established in 1911 in Nanjing as the Nanking Theological Seminary, an affiliated college of the University of Nanking until the late 1920s. The seminary was closed during the Cultural Revolution and re-established in 1981. It is managed by the national Three Self Patriotic Movement and the China Christian Council. This is the only theological seminary in mainland China that has international accreditation from the Association for Theological Education in South East Asia (ATESEA).

- North China Theological Seminary, Wuxi (无锡华北神学院)
- Northeast Theological Seminary (Chinese: 东北神学院)

Established in 1894 in Shenyang as the Presbyterian Junior College, it was renamed the Mukden Theological Seminary in 1898. In 1953, it was merged with the Yanjing Union Theological College and incorporated as part of the Nanjing Union Theological College in 1961. It was re-established as a separate institution in 1982 and is managed by the TSPM/CC of Liaoning Province.

- Shandong Theological Seminary (Chinese: 山东神学院)

Established in 1987 in Jinan. It is managed by the TSPM/CC of Shandong Province.

- Sichuan Theological Seminary (Chinese: 四川神学院)

Established in 1984 in Chengdu. It is jointly managed by the provincial TSPM/CCs of Sichuan, Guizhou, Yunnan and Chongqing.

- Yanjing Theological Seminary (Chinese: 燕京神学院)

Established in 1986 in Beijing. Not to be confused with the earlier Yanjing Union Theological Seminary which merged with the Nanjing Union Theological Seminary. It is jointly managed by the provincial TSPM/CCs of Beijing, Tianjin, Hebei, Shanxi, Inner Mongolia, Shaanxi, Gansu, Ningxia, Qinghai and Xinjiang.

- Yunnan Theological Seminary (Chinese: 云南神学院)

Established in 1950 in Kunming as the Yunnan Bible College on the premises of the pre-revolution Ling Kwang Bible College. It was closed in the Cultural Revolution and re-established in 1989 and is managed by the TSPM/CC of Yunnan Province.

- Zhejiang Theological Seminary (Chinese: 浙江神学院)

Established in 1984 in Hangzhou. It is managed by the TSPM/CC of Zhejiang Province.

- Zhongnan Theological Seminary (Chinese: 中南神学院)

Established in 1985 in Wuhan. It is jointly managed by the provincial TSPM/CCs of Henan, Hubei, Hunan, Guangdong, Hainan and Guangxi.

=== Hong Kong ===
- Alliance Bible Seminary (Chinese: 建道神學院)

Established in 1899 in Wuzhou as the Alliance Bible School under the auspices of the Christian and Missionary Alliance. It was relocated to Hong Kong after the Chinese Communist Revolution in 1949 and renamed in 1955. It is accredited internationally by the Asia Theological Association (ATA) and ATESEA.

- Asia Lutheran Seminary (Chinese: 亞洲路德宗神學院)

Established in 2005 by the Wisconsin Evangelical Lutheran Synod to train workers for the South Asian Lutheran Evangelical Mission.

== Colleges ==
=== Mainland China ===
A list of the officially registered two and three year junior college status theological institutions in mainland China.

- Guizhou Bible School (Chinese: 贵州圣经学校)

Established in 1993 in Panzhou as the Liupanshui Christian Theological Training Class, it was renamed the Guizhou Theological Training Centre in 1996 and moved to Guiyang. In 2013, it was granted approval to operate as a junior college. It is managed by the TSPM/CC of Guizhou Province.

- Hebei Bible School (Chinese: 河北圣经学校)

Established in 1995 in Shijiazhuang. It is managed by the TSPM/CC of Hebei Province.

- Hunan Bible Institute (Chinese: 湖南聖經學校; pinyin: Hunan Shengjing Xuexiao)

An important fundamentalist Bible school in early-20th century China. It was founded in 1916 and known as "Biola in China."

- Inner Mongolia Bible School (Chinese: 内蒙古圣经学校)

Established in 1987 in Hohhot as the Inner Mongolia Christian Volunteers Training Class. In 2007, it was granted approval to operate as a junior college. It is managed by the TSPM/CC of the Inner Mongolia Autonomous Region.

- Jiangxi Bible School (Chinese: 江西省圣经学校)

Established in 1992 in Nanchang as the Jiangxi Pastoral Training Class, it was registered and renamed in 1993. It is managed by the TSPM/CC of Jiangxi Province.

- Jilin Bible School (Chinese: 吉林省圣经学校)

Established in 2005 in Changchun. It is managed by the TSPM/CC of Jilin Province.

- Shaanxi Bible School (Chinese: 陕西省圣经学校)

Established in 1988 in Xianyang, the campus was moved to Xi'an in 1998. It is managed by the TSPM/CC of Shaanxi Province.

== See also ==
- Christianity in China
- Chinese house church
- Chinese Union Version of the Bible
- Chinese New Hymnal
- Timeline of Christian missions
- Protestant missions in China 1807–1953
- Protestantism in China
