= Heilongjiang Theological Seminary =

Heilongjiang Theological Seminary (simplified Chinese: 黑龙江神学院; traditional Chinese: 黑龍江神學院; pinyin: Hēilóngjiāng Shénxuéyuàn) is a provincial-level Christian theological institution in Harbin City of Heilongjiang, the northernmost province of China. Its predecessor is the "Christian Bible School of Heilongjiang Province". The seminary offers three undergraduate programs, among which the sacred music program is the first of its kind in China, and the special education program is the only one in China that trains pastoral personnel for deaf-mute Christian believers.

== Brief history ==
In 1996, the "Christian Bible School of Heilongjiang Province" was founded by the Heilongjiang Provincial Christian Council in Harbin, the provincial capital. The aim was to train more pastors for the growing churches across the province.

In 2009, with the approval of the State Administration of Religious Affairs, a junior college three-year program was started. And the school was renamed "Heilongjiang Bible School".

In 2011, the school merged with the Harbin Christian Bible School, and the merged Bible school was concentrated in the Mount of Olives Education Base in Harbin. The base covers an area of 1.3 million square meters and includes teaching buildings, a church, a reception center and a farm.

In 2013, with the approval of the State Administration of Religious Affairs, the Bible School was upgraded to an undergraduate institution offering four-year study programs, and was renamed "Heilongjiang Theological Seminary."

== Present situation ==
The main mission of Heilongjiang Theological Seminary is to cultivate patriotic and religious clergy for the province. It currently offers three undergraduate programs in Bible Studies, Sacred Music and Special Education, in a four-year academic system. The Bible program focuses on cultivating pastoral staff with good character and theological attainments; the Sacred Music program is the first of its kind in China and has successfully cultivated many sacred music worship leaders with musical skills and theological knowledge, who are able to compose Christian songs using local theology; the Special education program is the only one in the country specifically built for the deaf. The purpose is to admit and train deaf students so that they can provide more appropriate pastoral care to the deaf community. The school also publishes Christian sign language books to help with sign language translation.

The seminary currently has 34 full-time teachers and 10 part-time teachers. The current present is Pastor Lv Dezhi. There are nearly 90 full-time undergraduate students on campus. Since its establishment, the college has trained more than 1,000 theological graduates.

On the campus, there are teaching buildings, student dormitories, cafeteria, the Mount of Olives Chapel (also known as the Ark Chapel), the Five Loaves and Two Fishes Reception Center, the Mount of Olives Library and a farm, etc. The library has a building area of more than 5,300 square meters and has more than 60,000 paper books and more than 600,000 electronic books.

There are more than fifty dedicated prayer rooms on campus, each equipped with a cross and a prayer mat, where students can pray to God alone.

== See also ==
- Christianity in Heilongjiang
- List of Protestant theological seminaries in China
- Northeast Theological Seminary
