= Yunnan Theological Seminary =

Yunnan Theological Seminary (simplified Chinese: 云南神学院; traditional Chinese: 雲南神學院; pinyin: Yúnnán Shénxuéyuàn), full name Yunnan Christian Theological Seminary, is a full-time three-year theological college run by the Christian Council of Yunnan Province. It is located in Kunming, the provincial capital. Yunnan Theological Seminary is mainly for the non-Han ethnic minorities in China. Among the theological colleges of the country, it has the largest number of ethnic minority students and minority varieties.

== Brief history ==
In 1950, the "Chejiabi Bible School", "Qianguang Bible College" and "Lingguang Bible College" in Kunming merged to form the "Yunnan Bible College".

In 1958, Yunnan Bible College was closed.

In March 1989, with the approval of the Yunnan Provincial People's Government, the Yunnan Provincial Christian Council established the "Yunnan Theological Seminary" on the basis of the Bible College. The school was located at No. 59, Kunsha Road, Huangtupo, Kunming, with a construction area of about 1,700 square meters, enough to accommodate 50 students.

In 2010, the school moved to the Kunming Christian Training Center in Chenggong District to continue its operation.

In 2013, the demolition and reconstruction project of Yunnan Theological Seminary was launched in Dapuji Village, Wuhua District, Kunming.

In 2014, the school moved to its current location on Xiaotun Road, Wuhua District, Kunming. The campus covers an area of more than 13,000 square meters, with a building area of nearly 10,000 square meters (including the chapel, classrooms, library, office building, student dormitory and other buildings), which can accommodate 200 students. The total investment was about 40 million Chinese yuan.

== Current situation ==
Yunnan Theological Seminary is now a full-time theological college with three-year programs. The school's teaching purpose is to cultivate pastoral talents with high theological attainments, love for the church and the motherland, and adherence to the Sinicization of Christianity for the Yunnan churches. The curriculum includes theological courses and common courses. The theological courses include scripture studies, biblical theology, systematic theology, historical theology, practical theology, etc. The common courses include studies on ideology and politics, studies on policies, law and regulations, Chinese history and culture, Chinese religions, contemporary Chinese society, etc. In addition, Yunnan Theological Seminary has a tea ceremony classroom where students can learn about the traditional Chinese tea culture.

The current president of the seminary is Jing Jiuwei. The faculty includes 12 full-time teachers and 6 visiting teachers.

The library has a collection of nearly 20,000 paper books.

Yunnan Theological Seminary is mainly for ethnic minorities in mainland China. Students come from more than a dozen ethnic groups, including the Yi people, Lisu people, Miao people, Jingpo people, Lahu people, Han people, etc. The non-Han Ethnic minority students account for nearly 86%. Among all the seminaries in the country, Yunnan Seminary has the largest number of ethnic minority students and the largest number of ethnic groups.

Yunnan Theological Seminary currently has more than 150 students and has trained nearly 1,000 graduates since its establishment. In addition, it holds short-term training courses every year to train about 100 pastoral staff members.

== See also ==
- List of Protestant theological seminaries in China
- Sichuan Theological Seminary
