= South Asian Lutheran Evangelical Mission =

South Asian Lutheran Evangelical Mission 南亞路德會
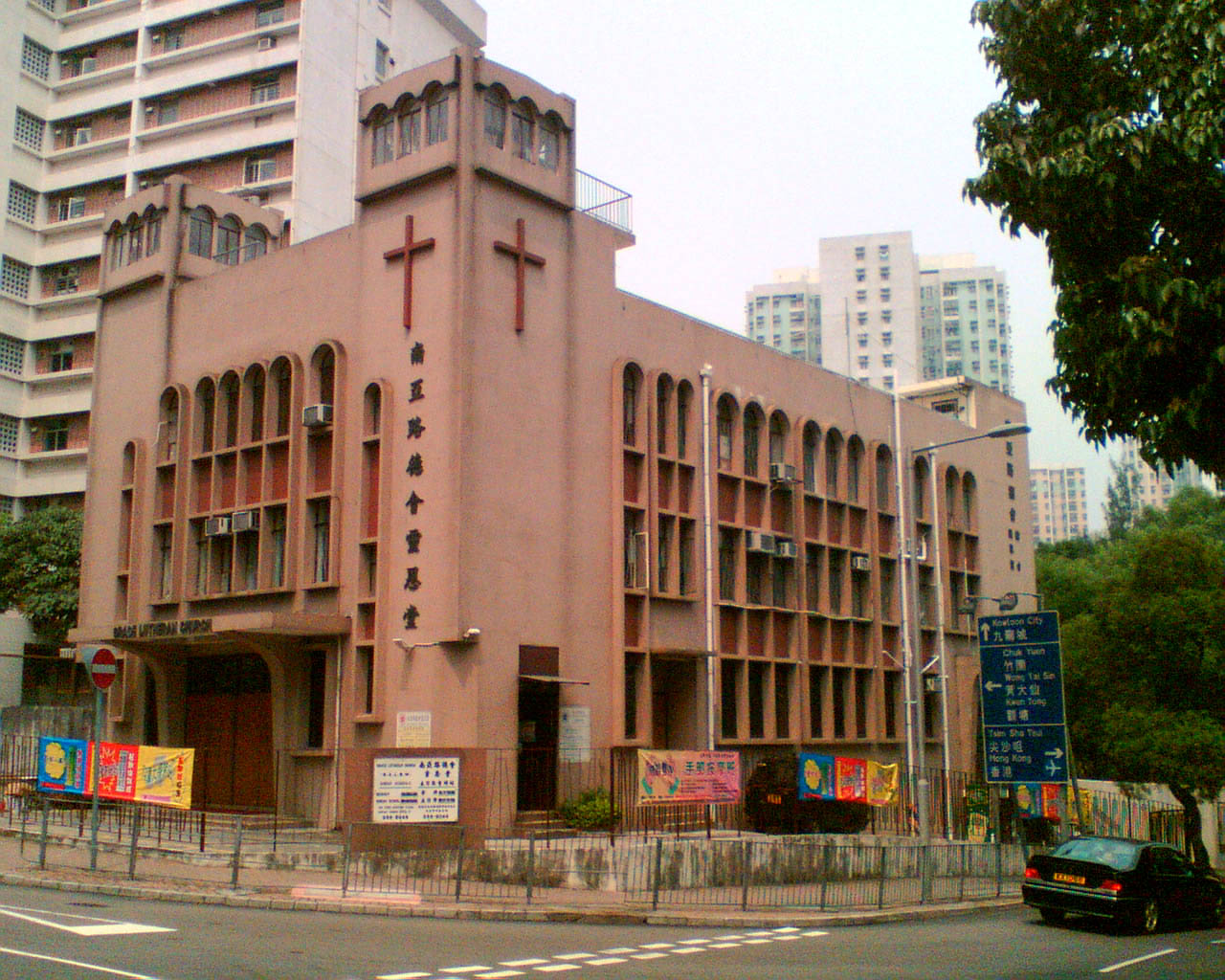
- South Asia Lutheran Church Building
- Type: Protestant
- Classification: Lutheran
- Scripture: Hebrew Old Testament; Koine Greek New Testament
- President: Rev. Alex Wong
- Decision-maker: Board of Directors
- Social services: Five social service centers
- Publishing house: 聖臨出版社 (Shenglin Publishing House)
- Associations: Confessional Evangelical Lutheran Conference (CELC)
- Region: Hong Kong
- Headquarters: 2/F, South Asia Lutheran Church Building, 4 Broadcast Drive, Kowloon
- Origin: 1977; Hong Kong
- Congregations: Ten churches
- Secondary schools: SALEM-Immanuel Lutheran College
- Tertiary institutions: South Asia Lutheran Bible College, South Asia Lutheran Theological Seminary
- Official website: salem.org.hk

The South Asian Lutheran Evangelical Mission (SALEM) is a Confessional Lutheran Protestant church in Hong Kong. It was founded in 1977 by missionaries from the Wisconsin Evangelical Lutheran Synod (WELS) in the United States. The subordinates of SALEM include churches, schools and social service units.

== History ==
In 1963, the Minnesota Evangelical Lutheran Synod (ELS) in the United States sent Peter Chang, a Chinese graduate from Bethany Lutheran Theological Seminary, to Hong Kong to establish the Christian Chinese Lutheran Mission (CCLM). In 1964, another Lutheran Synod in the United States, the Wisconsin Evangelical Lutheran Synod (WELS), joined in supporting the CCLM's missionary work in Hong Kong.

Between 1963 and 1977, the Christian Chinese Lutheran Mission established Grace Lutheran Church, Immanuel Lutheran Church, Immanuel Lutheran College, a bookstore, and a seminary in Hong Kong.

In 1974, the headquarters building (now known as the SALEM Tower) was completed on the Broadcast Drive in Kowloon. The church held a dedication ceremony at the new site on December 1 of the same year.

In 1977, the Wisconsin Lutheran Church reorganized its missionary work in Hong Kong， ended the Christian Chinese Lutheran Mission and re-established a local church organization named the "South Asian Lutheran Evangelical Mission (SALEM)", with Rev. David Schweide as president. "SALEM" is also the English form of the Hebrew word for “peace”.

In 1983, SALEM's affiliated secondary school Immanuel Lutheran College moved to its new premises in Tai Yuen Village, Tai Po (and was renamed Muk Yan Secondary School). The school closed its Kwun Tong campus, and the Emmanuel Church moved to the Grace Reading Center in Block 28, Sau Mau Ping Village, a student study room operated by SALEM.

In 1983, the SALEM Bible College was established to train pastors to minister the Church. In 1985, the SALEM Theological Seminary was established to train graduates of the Bible College to become missionary workers. Rev. Gary A. Kirschke, a missionary, served as president of both schools.

In 1984, Muk Yan Church was established at the Muk Yan Secondary School premises in Tai Yuen Village, Tai Po.

In 1987, the Sam Shing Church was established at Sam Shing Village, Tuen Mun.

In 1987, Lai King Church was established at Lai King Village, Kwai Chung. Later, due to the relocation of the church to the new site in Cheung Sha Wan, it was renamed Wing Kei Church.

In 1989, the Sha Tin Church was established in Yat Ming Village, Sha Tin (Later renamed Yireth Church).

In 1990, the Yuen Long Church was established in Long Ping Village, Yuen Long.

In 1991, the Yau Oi Church was established in Yau Oi Village, Tuen Mun.

In 1995, the South Asia Lutheran Kindergarten was established in Shau Kei Wan in August. A year later, the ninth church, Shau Kei Wan Church was established within the kindergarten.

In 1997, South Asian Lutheran Evangelical Mission completed its localization. The Chairman and two Vice-Chairmen of the Board of Directors were all local Chinese. SALEM became independent, connected to its original mother church WELS as a partner.

In 2003, Taipo Lutheran Church established the "Family Network Social Service Center" to spread the Gospel in the community.

In 2005, WELS in the United States sent Rev. J Lawrenz to Hong Kong to establish the Asia Lutheran Seminary (ALS).

In 2007, South Asian Lutheran Evangelical Mission celebrated its 30th Anniversary and established the "Preacher Training Fund"

In 2016, the Amazing Grace Church was established in December.

In 2017, SALEM joined the Confessional Evangelical Lutheran Conference (CELC).

On January 1, 2025, Rev. Alex Wong officially took over the role of SALEM chairman from Rev. Titus Tse.

== Organization ==
=== Headquarters ===
The highest decision-making authority of the South Asian Lutheran Evangelical Mission rests with the Board of Directors, which is responsible for developing and promoting the church's evangelical work, theological education, and social service ministries. The headquarters is located at 4 Broadcast Drive, Kowloon, Hong Kong.

=== Churches ===
Currently, South Asian Lutheran Evangelical Mission (SALEM) has ten congregation churchs, including:

- SALEM-Grace Lutheran Church (靈恩堂)
- SALEM-Shen'en Church (深恩堂)
- SALEM-Jireh Church (以勒堂)
- SALEM-Taipo Lutheran Church (沐恩堂)
- SALEM-Mok Oi Church (沐愛堂)
- SALEM-Yuen Long Church (元朗堂)
- SALEM-Triple Holy Church (三聖堂)
- SALEM-Yau Oi Church (友愛堂)
- SALEM-Wing Kei Church (永基堂)
- SALEM-Shau Kei Wan Church (筲箕灣堂)

=== Theological Education ===
- South Asia Lutheran Bible College
- South Asia Lutheran Theological Seminary
- Asia Lutheran Seminary

=== Social Service Units ===
There are

- SALEM-Immanuel Lutheran College
- SALEM-Family Network Social Service Centre
- SALEM-Lai King Reading Centre
- SALEM-Tri-Holy Reading Centre
- SALEM-Long Ping Reading Centre
- SALEM-Friendship Reading Centre
- SALEM-Deep Grace Center

== Doctrine ==
South Asian Lutheran Evangelical Mission is a “Confessional Lutheran” church. “Confession” refers to the church’s confession of the three ecumenical creeds of the Apostles’ Creed, the Nicene Creed and the Athanasian Creed, as well as a number of Lutheran confessional documents, including the Augsburg Confession, the Apology of the Augsburg Confession, the Schmalgarden Confession, On the Papacy and the Primacy, the Larger Catechism, the Smaller Catechism, and the Concordat. In addition to inheriting many traditional doctrines from the history of the universal church, such as the Trinity, the Bible as God's revelation, original sin, and the Last Judgment, the South Asian Lutheran Church also emphasizes "justification by faith", "all believers are priests", and takes the Bible as the highest authority,

== See also ==
- Lutheranism
- Wisconsin Evangelical Lutheran Synod
