= Qipanshan International Scenery and Tourism Development Zone =

Scenic area of Shenyang, China

Coordinates: 41°56′31″N 123°40′13″E

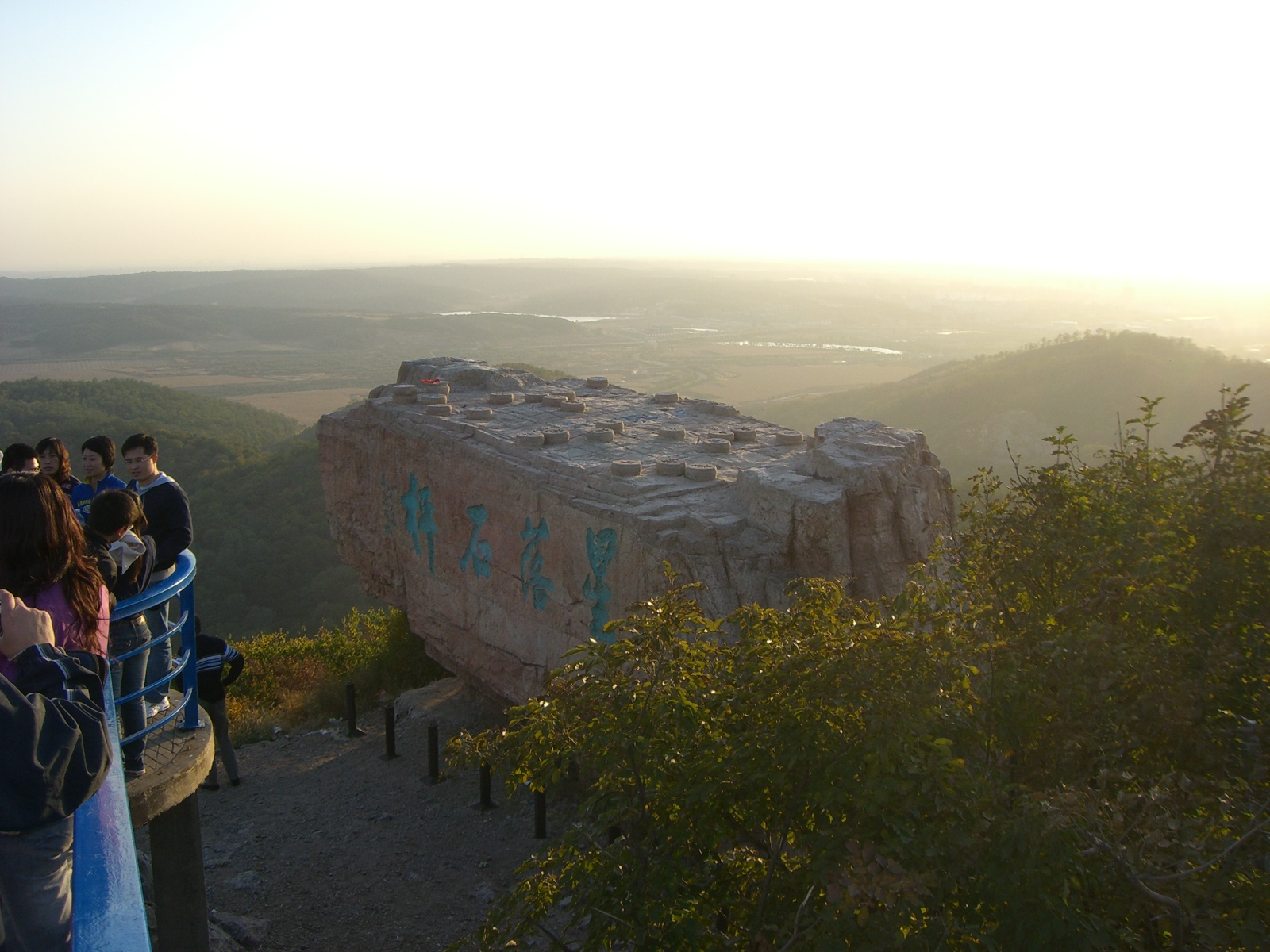
Mount Qipan is so named because of a natural rock formation resembling a chess board.

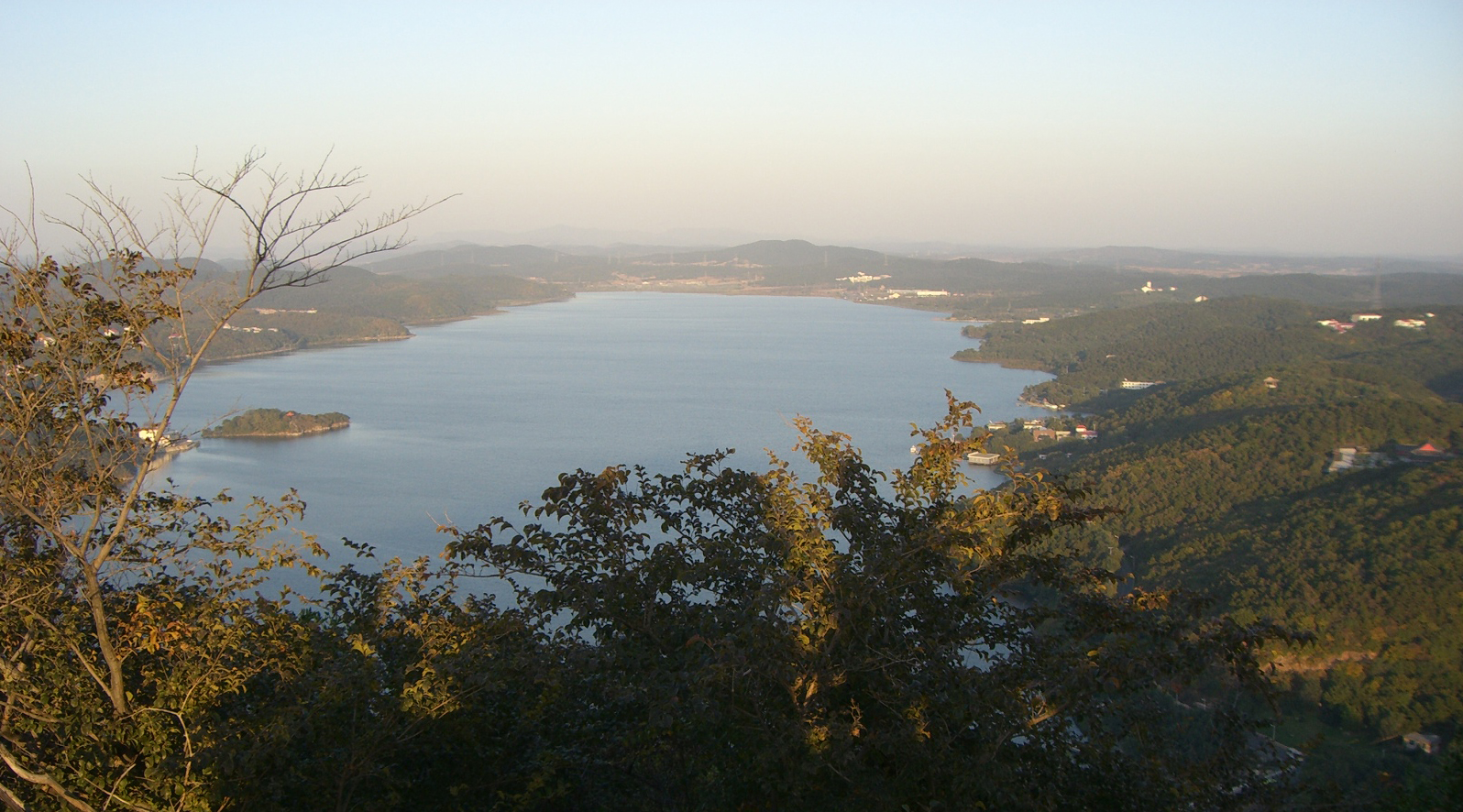
Lake Xiu. Xiu in Chinese means "Bright" or "Beautiful".

Qipanshan International Scenery and Tourism Development Zone (Chinese: 棋盘山国际风景旅游开发区), often referred to as Qipanshan Tourism Development Zone, is a development zone for scenery and tourism, located in the eastern suburbs of Shenyang, the capital city of Liaoning, China.

The area is under the jurisdiction of Shenyang's Hunnan District. Qipanshan Tourism Development Zone has an administrative area of 190 square kilometers and consists of three parts: the Forest Park Scenic Area, the Lake Xiu Scenic Area, and the Shenyang Botanical Garden (the former site of International Horticultural Expo 2006). It has three townships under its jurisdiction, and a total population of 51,000.

The main tourist attractions in the area are Mount Qipan (棋盘山), Lake Xiu (秀湖), Shenyang National Forest Park, Shenyang Botanical Garden, Fuling Mausoleum, Shenyang Forest Safari Park, Shenjing Golf Club, etc.

In 2000, the Development Zone was included in the first batch of China's AAAA-rated scenic areas.

== See also ==
- Shenyang's Attractions
- Fuling Mausoleum
