= Jiangsu Theological Seminary =

Jiangsu Theological Seminary (simplified Chinese: 江苏神学院; traditional Chinese: 江蘇神學院; pinyin: Jiāngsū Shénxuéyuàn) was built by the Jiangsu Provincial Christian Council in Nanjing of China in 1998, offering 3-year junior college programs in theology. In 2012, it was upgraded to an advanced college providing four-year undergraduate programs. In addition to the main campus in Nanjing, there are branch campuses in Suqian and Suzhou.

== History ==
In 1998, the "Jiangsu Christian Bible School" was established as a junior college offering three-year study programs. The school was located at No. 4, Xianyin North Road, Xianlin University Town, Qixia District, Nanjing City, Jiangsu Province, covering an area of 13 mu.

In 2012, the jounor College was upgraded to Jiangsu Theological Seminary, a higher religious college offering four-year undergraduate programs.

In 2015, the seminary journal named Jiangsu Theological Reviews was launched. It serves as a communication platform for theological research on Chinese Christianity.

In 2023, the school library was expanded into two floors. The first floor is mainly for book lending, and on the second floor there are a reading room and a cafe.

== Current situation ==
Jiangsu Theological Seminary is located at No. 5 North Xianyin Road, Xixia District, Nanjing City, Jiangsu Province, covering an area of 9,000 square meters. In addition to the main campus in Nanjing, there are branch campuses in Suqian and Suzhou.

The seminary adheres to Sinicization of Christianity, and aims at cultivating pastoral talents who love the country and the religion, have considerable theological attainments, and are physically and mentally healthy. The school offers four-year undergraduate programs in theology and three-year junior college programs in theology, including the courses of Bible studies, theology, ecclesiastical history, pastoral practice, politics, history, philosophy, etc.

The current president is Zhang Keyun. The faculty include 38 teachers, among whom 17 are full-time.

The school library has a collection of over 36,000 Chinese and English books in hardcopies, in addition to three types of e-books. The total area of the library is more than 700 square meters, divided into two floors. The first floor is mainly for book lending, and on the second floor there are a reading room and a cafe.

By the year of 2021, nearly 1,200 students have graduated. And in the academic year of 2022, there are nearly 360 students enrolled.

The seminary also runs the academic journal Jiangsu Theological Reviews, which was launched in 2015. It serves as a communication platform for theological research on Christianity in Jiangsu, China and the world.

== See also ==
- List of Protestant theological seminaries in China
- Nanjing Union Theological Seminary
