= Anhui Theological Seminary =

Anhui Theological Seminary (simplified Chinese: 安徽神学院; traditional Chinese: 安徽神學院; pinyin: Ānhuī Shénxuéyuàn) is a Protestant institution founded by the Anhui Christian Councial for theological education. It is a provincial seminary located in Hefei, capital of Anhui Province in China.

== History ==
In March 1986, Anhui Theological Seminary was established by the Anhui Christian Councial. In June of the following year, the school started running a two-year study program in the Hefei Christian Church.

In 1991, the seminary ran a one-year training class in theology.

In 1992, the school moved to a rented house in the north suburb of Hefei.

In 1996, a piece of land of 12 mus was purchased for the construction of a new campus.

In 1997, the school started to offer three-year college programs in theology.

In 1999, the new campus was built, with about 6,000 square meters of floor area.

== Present situation ==
The mission of the seminary is to cultivate Christian pastoral successors who have certain theological attainments and can lead believers on the path of loving both the motherland and the religion. The subjects offered by the seminary includes the Reconstruction of Theological Thinking, Commentaries on the Old and New Testament, Christian Theology, Church History, Pastoral Ministry, Hermeneutics, Homiletics, Christian Ethics, Worship Studies, Church Management, Pastoral Counseling, and Sacred Music, etc.

Currently, there are about 170 students enrolled in the school. A total of more than 2,400 students have graduated from the theological programs and training classes, and most of them are engaged in pastoral work in Anhui churches.

The current president of the seminary is Rev. Chen Tianyuan. The faculty includes 11 full-time teachers and some part-time teachers. And the seminary has holden several training courses for improving teachers' teaching ability.

The campus covers an area of 12 mus, where there are teaching buildings, dormitory buildings and an auditorium, etc. The school library has a collection of over 30,000 books.

The seminary is also a station of the United Bible Societies for bible resources distribution.

== Address ==
Campus address: Middle section of Fushu Road, Xinzhan District, Hefei City, Anhui Province

Email: anhuishenxueyuan@126.com

== See also ==
- List of Protestant theological seminaries in China
