= Zhejiang Theological Seminary =

Zhejiang Theological Seminary (simplified Chinese: 浙江神学院; traditional Chinese: 浙江神學院; pinyin: Zhèjiāng Shénxuéyuàn) is a higher religious institution located in Hangzhou, the capital of Zhejiang Province in China, and is sponsored by the Zhejiang Provincial Christian Council. In addition to classroom teaching, students also go to more than 100 Christian nursing homes and various bases for internship practices across the province. Since its founding in 1984, Zhejiang Theological Seminary has cultivated more than 2,000 pastoral staff for churches in the province.

== Brief history ==
In 1982, when church worship gatherings were resumed after the Cultural Revolution in China, six training classes were held in Zhejian to cultivate pastoral staff for the province.

In October 1984, "Zhejiang Christian Theology School" was founded in Hangzhou Sicheng Church.

In June 1985, with the approval of the Religious Affairs Bureau of the Zhejiang Provincial People's Government, the school was renamed "Zhejiang Theological Seminary", and a two-year theological program was launched.

In 1987, a one-year advanced course was added, with around 40 students.

In 1995, the two-year theological program was extended to a three-year program, with the number of students increased to about 70.

In 2000, the college moved to Jiangling Road, Binjiang District, Hangzhou.

In 2009, the academic journal "Zhejiang Theology" was founded.

In 2011, the school was upgraded to a Christian institution of higher education offering a four-year undergraduate degree program in theology.

In 2015, a postgraduate program in pastoral ministry was launched on a trial basis.

== Current situation ==
Zhejiang Theological Seminary strives to create a "four-in-one" caring education model: the Christian council, the theological seminary, the churches and the student families jointly cultivate new pastoral talents. The purpose of the school is to produce pastoral staff who can consciously accept the leadership of the government, adhere to the Sinicization of Christianity, have academic attainments, and have close contact with believers. The motto of the seminary is: "Purity, Faithfulness, Reconciliation and Joy."

The curriculum programs includes: Postgraduate Theology, Undergraduate Theology, Bible Diploma, Sacred Music Diploma and Correspondence programs. Students learn both theoretical and empirical knowledge. In addition to classroom teaching, they also go to more than 100 Christian nursing homes and various practical bases for internships across the province (including the teaching and research practice education base, patriotism education practice base, anti-cult warning education base, social service practice base, culture and art education base, etc.). The seminary also offers scholarships and grants.

The seminary has 14 full-time teachers and 15 visiting teachers in 2022. The president is Rev. Pan Xingwang.

In 2022, the library has nearly 50,000 hardcopy books and provides access to nearly 125,000 e-books from the platforms of Logos Bible, Amazon Kindle Unlimited, etc.

Currently, there are nearly 600 full-time students, correspondence students, and pastoral graduate students. Since its establishment, the seminary has produced more than 2,300 graduates, most of whom are serving in the churches of Zhejiang.

The college also has a school magazine, Zhejiang Theology. The content involves biblical theological research, Sinicization of Christianity, theological English, etc.

== Campus ==
Zhejiang Theological Seminary is located at No. 1425, Jiangling Road, Binjiang District, Hangzhou, Zhejiang Province, China. The campus covers an area of 12 mu and has a construction area of more than 15,000 square meters. The tower of the main building is mounted with a cross. There are also a chapel (of 500 seats), a library, reading rooms, classrooms, student living rooms, etc.

== See also ==
- List of Protestant theological seminaries in China
- Nanjing Union Theological Seminary
