= Qingdao International Beer Festival =

Festival in China

The Qingdao International Beer Festival (simplified Chinese: 青岛国际啤酒节; traditional Chinese: 青島國際啤酒節; pinyin: qīngdǎo guójì píjiǔjié) is a yearly festival held in Qingdao in Shandong province, China. The event is jointly sponsored by national state ministries and the Qingdao Municipal Government.

== History ==
The first Qingdao International Beer Festival was held in 1991 to celebrate the 100th anniversary of the town's establishment. Tsingtao Beer took the lead in hosting the first Qingdao International Beer Festival, festivals feature artistic parades, "Beer Carnival" games, beer tasting, drinking contests, music, food, interactive performances, various brewery beer tents, trade exhibitions, gala performances, carnival amusement park games and rides, and even bikini model contests.

Every year, the festival starts at the second weekend of August and lasts for 16 days.

== Highlights ==
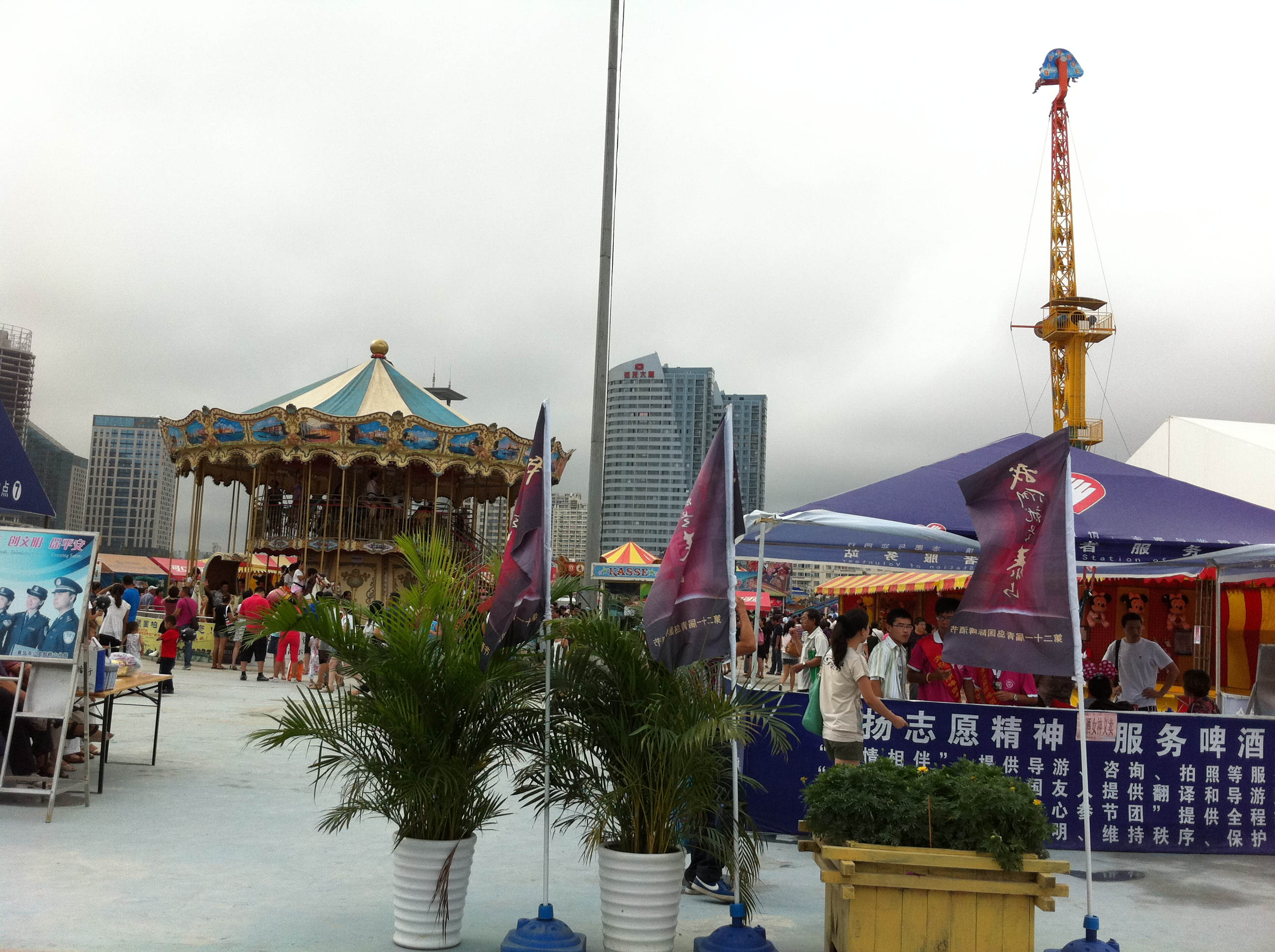
Qingdao International Beer City

The festival is held at multiple locations throughout the city. In 2015, a 66.6-hectare site was constructed containing beer tents and stalls selling sauerkraut, bratwurst and beer in plastic carrier bags (a festival tradition) as well as Bavarian band music, mass drinking competitions, Peking opera performances and karaoke.
