= Sichuan Theological Seminary =

The Sichuan Theological Seminary (simplified Chinese: 四川神学院; traditional Chinese: 四川神學院; pinyin: Sìchuān Shénxuéyuàn), one of the five major regional theological colleges in China, is located in Chengdu, capital of Sichuan Province. It is an advanced theological seminary jointly established by three provinces and one city in Southwest China, and recruits students of more than 20 different ethnic groups of the region. The school is also a research base for the Sinicization of Christianity.

== History ==
In 1983, with the approval of the General Office of the State Council of the PRC, the Christian councils of the three provinces and one municipality (Yunnan, Guizhou, Sichuan, and Chongqing) in Southwestern China jointly founded the Sichuan Theological Seminary in Chengdu.

In October 1984, the seminary officially opened in Chengdu Shangxiang Church, recruiting students from the churches in the southwestern region of China.

In July 1988, the seminary moved to Enguang Church (恩光堂) in the city center.

In September 1994, the seminary moved to its current address: No.19 North Sishengci Street, Jinjiang District, Chengdu City.

== Current situation ==
Sichuan Theological Seminary offers a four-year undergraduate program and a two-year associate degree program in divinity. It aims to meet the actual needs of the southwest region and cultivate church talents proficient in both Christian doctrine and Chinese traditional culture, who are willing to serve the churches and society, and who love the country and the church. The curriculum is divided into two parts: professional courses and public courses. Professional courses include "Introduction to the New Testament", "Introduction to the Old Testament", "Biblical Background", "World Christian History", "History of Christian Thought", "Old Testament Theology", "New Testament Theology", "Church Management", "History of Chinese Christianity", "Christian Ethics", etc. Public courses include "Xi Jinping Thought", "Chinese Religious Patriotism", "Situation and National Conditions", "China's United Front Theory and Practice", "Religious Policies and Regulations", etc. In addition, the theological seminary also runs continuing education training courses for grassroots pastoral staff.

The current president of Sichuan Theological Seminary is Pastor Rao Jianhua. There are 10 full-time teachers and 16 visiting teachers. And there is a library with a collection of nearly 20,000 books.

Students come from Christians of Han and 20 other nationalities in China. In 2024, 22 students graduated successfully. In the 40 years since its establishment, the seminary has produced a total of 1,018 graduates, many of whom have become leaders and backbone talents for the churches in southwest China.

Sichuan Theological Seminary is one of the five major regional theological seminaries in China, and is also a research base for the Sinicization of Christianity.

== See also ==
- List of Protestant theological seminaries in China
- Protestantism in Sichuan
