= Asia Lutheran Seminary =

Christian seminary in Hong Kong

Coordinates: 22°19′18″N 114°10′04″E

- Chinese: 亞洲路德宗神學院
- Motto: Truth Shared
- Type: Seminary
- Established: 2005
- Founders: Wisconsin Evangelical Lutheran Synod
- President: Dr. Jon Bare
- Location: 8/F, Chun Hoi Commercial Building, Number 688, Shanghai Street, Mong Kok, Kowloon, Hong Kong
- Website: https://en.asiaseminary.com/

Asia Lutheran Seminary (ALS) is a Lutheran seminary in Hong Kong. It was established by the Wisconsin Evangelical Lutheran Synod in 2005. Originally focused on training pastors and evangelists for China, the school has now expanded its services across Asia and beyond. ALS is an accredited member of the Asia Theological Association, and offers training programs ranging from certificate courses to doctor degrees.

== History ==
In 1977, the South Asia Lutheran Evangelical Mission (SALEM) was founded in Hong Kong by the Wisconsin Evangelical Lutheran Synod (WELS) to enhance theological training for future Chinese Christian leaders of the region.

In 1997, Hong Kong returned to Chinese rule, and SALEM became an independent church.

In May 29, 2005, the Asia Lutheran Seminary (ALS) was established by SALEM at 688 Shanghai Street, Kowloon. It was for training Chinese-speaking pastors.

From 2005 to 2010, Dr. Lawrenz served as president and primary teacher of ALS, with the help of visiting professors from the USA and WELS.

In December 2007, Dr. John Lawrenz, President of the Asian Lutheran Theological Seminary, lectured on the "Five Sole" principles. His ministry includes publishing the "Bible—Five Sole" edition.

In November 2009, the first class of students from Asia Lutheran Seminary successfully graduated.

In 2011, Dr. Steve Witte became president of ALS.

In 2017, the first East Asia class of Master of Divinity graduated.

In 2021, Cheung, Kwok Fai became the first full time Chinese professor at the school.

In 2022, ALS became an accredited member of the Asia Theological Association.

In 2023, Dr. Jon Bare becomes the president of ALS. ALS was tasked with serving as the regional seminary of Asia.

On June 1, 2025, Asia Lutheran Seminary (ALS) celebrated its 20th anniversary, as well as its expansion to serve students across Asia and beyond.

== Programs ==
Asia Lutheran Seminary offers the following degree programs (all accredited by the Asia Theological Association):

- Bachelor of Theology
- Master of Divinity
- Graduate Diploma
- Doctor of Ministry

In addition, there are language programs for

- Certificate in Biblical Hebrew
- Certificate in Biblical Greek.

== Other information ==
Asia Lutheran Seminary is located at: 8/F, Chun Hoi Commercial Building, 688 Shanghai Street, Mong Kok, Kowloon, HONG KONG.

The Mission of ALS is "To prepare Christians to serve as leaders of Confessional Lutheran groups across Asia."

The school library was established in 2008. Its collections are mainly on Christianity, philosophy and Lutheran theology, and available in both English and Chinese.

The school is an accredited member of the Asia Theological Association.

== See also ==
- List of Protestant theological seminaries in China
- Wisconsin Lutheran Seminary
- China Christian Council
- China Lutheran Seminary
