= SALEM-Immanuel Lutheran College =

Secondary school in Hong Kong

Immanuel Lutheran College Chinese: 南亞路德會沐恩中學
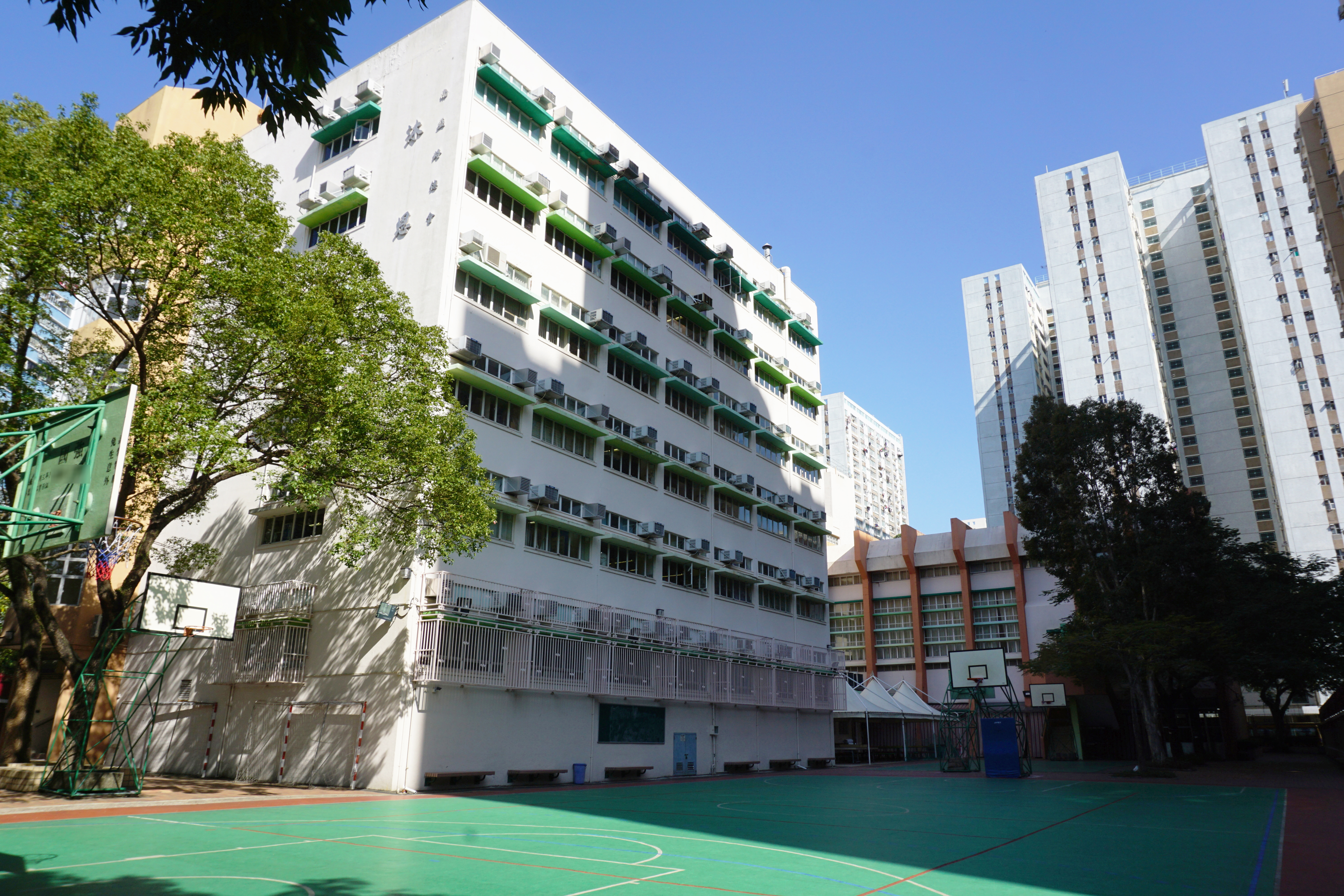

Location
- Tai Yuen Estate, Tai Po, Hong Kong; Hong Kong
- Coordinates: 22°27′20″N 114°10′1″E

Information
- School type: Government assisted secondary school Aided Co-educational Secondary Grammar School
- Motto: Wisdom, Truth, Virtue and Love to All
- Religious affiliation: Christianity
- Established: 1983; 43 years ago
- School district: Tai Po
- Principal: Ms Wut Pui Fun(Start from 1/9/2021)
- Language: English
- Website: ilc.edu.hk

SALEM-Immanuel Lutheran College (ILC; Chinese: 南亞路德會沐恩中學) is a Hong Kong Aided Co-educational Christian Secondary School with primary and secondary sessions, founded in 1983. The college serves both boys and girls. The campus is now located in Tai Yuen Estate, Tai Po, New Territories.

== History ==
The school was started as Immanuel Lutheran English Middle School in Kwun Tong, Kowloon. It was operated by the South Asian Lutheran Evangelical Mission inside a private mansion. Because of its small size, it was eventually decided to phase out the Middle School and start Immanuel Lutheran College in the New Territories. The college was established in 1983.

An additional wing was constructed between 1996 and 1997. Computer networks and multi-media projectors have also been installed. There are now two Multimedia Language Centres, two Computer Rooms, one Multimedia Production Centre, and one Multimedia Studio (the WoW Production Studio) in the school.

== School mission ==
The college devotes to the provision of a quality education in a Christian context and a healthy environment where students can develop their potential, excel intellectually, physically, socially, and spiritually, and prepare themselves for the challenges in life.

== School motto ==
Wisdom, Truth, Virtue, Love to all - 博學明道，臻善益群

== Symbolisation of the school logo ==
The cross at the top represents the school's Christian background; the grid (fish net) and the pearl at the centre symbolises Tai Po at its early stages; the source of book, with pages printed Greek alphabets Alpha and Omega, can be derived from a Biblical scripture: "I (the God) am the Alpha and the Omega, the beginning and the end." (first part of Revelation of John, 21:6), and also indicates the thought of Christian education.

== Principal ==
List of ILC principals:

Order	Year	Name
1	1983 – 2004	Mr Yau Chun Wan (丘頌云先生)
2	2004 – 2012	Mr Yeung Wing Kit (楊永傑先生)
3	2012 – 2021	Ms Wong Yiu Kiu (黃堯姫女士)
4	2021 -	Ms Wut Pui Fun (屈佩芬女士)

== Class Structure ==
The number of operating classes
Level	S1	S2	S3	S4	S5	S6
No. of Classes	4	4	5	4	4	4

SALEM-Immanuel Lutheran College employs English as the main medium of instruction. Subjects that offer to Junior and Senior student are listed in below.

Junior-Form Curriculum - Chinese Language, English Language, Mathematics, Christian Ethics, Liberal Studies, Putonghua, Chinese History, World History, Physics, Chemistry, Biology, Integrated Science, Geography, Physical Education, Home Economics, Design & Applied Technology, Visual Arts, Music, Computer Literacy, Introduction to Economics, Business, Accounting & Financial Studies

Senior-Form Curriculum -

Class	First Elective	Second Elective	Third Elective	Core Subjects
S.4A	Physics	Chemistry	1) BAFS 2) Biology 3) Geography 4) Geography 4) Information and Technology (ICT) 5) Visual Art	English Language, Chinese Language, Mathematics, Liberal Studies, Aesthetic Development, Physical Education, Christian Ethics,
S.4B	Biology	Chemistry	1) BAFS 2) Biology 3) Geography 4) Geography 4) Information and Technology (ICT) 5) Visual Art	English Language, Chinese Language, Mathematics, Liberal Studies, Aesthetic Development, Physical Education, Christian Ethics,
S.4C	Economics	1) Physics 2) History 3) Chinese History	1) BAFS 2) Biology 3) Geography 4) Geography 4) Information and Technology (ICT) 5) Visual Art	English Language, Chinese Language, Mathematics, Liberal Studies, Aesthetic Development, Physical Education, Christian Ethics,
S.4D	Business, Accounting and Financial Studies (BAFS)	1) Physics 2) History 3) Chinese History	1) BAFS 2) Biology 3) Geography 4) Geography 4) Information and Technology (ICT) 5) Visual Art	English Language, Chinese Language, Mathematics, Liberal Studies, Aesthetic Development, Physical Education, Christian Ethics,

To meet students’ needs, multiple subject combinations are offered to students to choose from based on their own interests and abilities. After the classification of classes in secondary four, students are allowed to drop the elective(s) before the starts of secondary five and six.

== Student life ==
Upon the enrolment day, freshman for ILC are divided into four houses, Samuel, Enoch, Esther and Deborah, which are famous names that appear in the Old Testament. Students are encouraged to engage in different houses' activities in order to strengthen their social skills and inspire their potentials.

Four Houses
House	Representative colour
Samuel	Red
Enoch	Yellow
Esther	Purple
Deborah	Green
