= Zhongnan Theological Seminary =

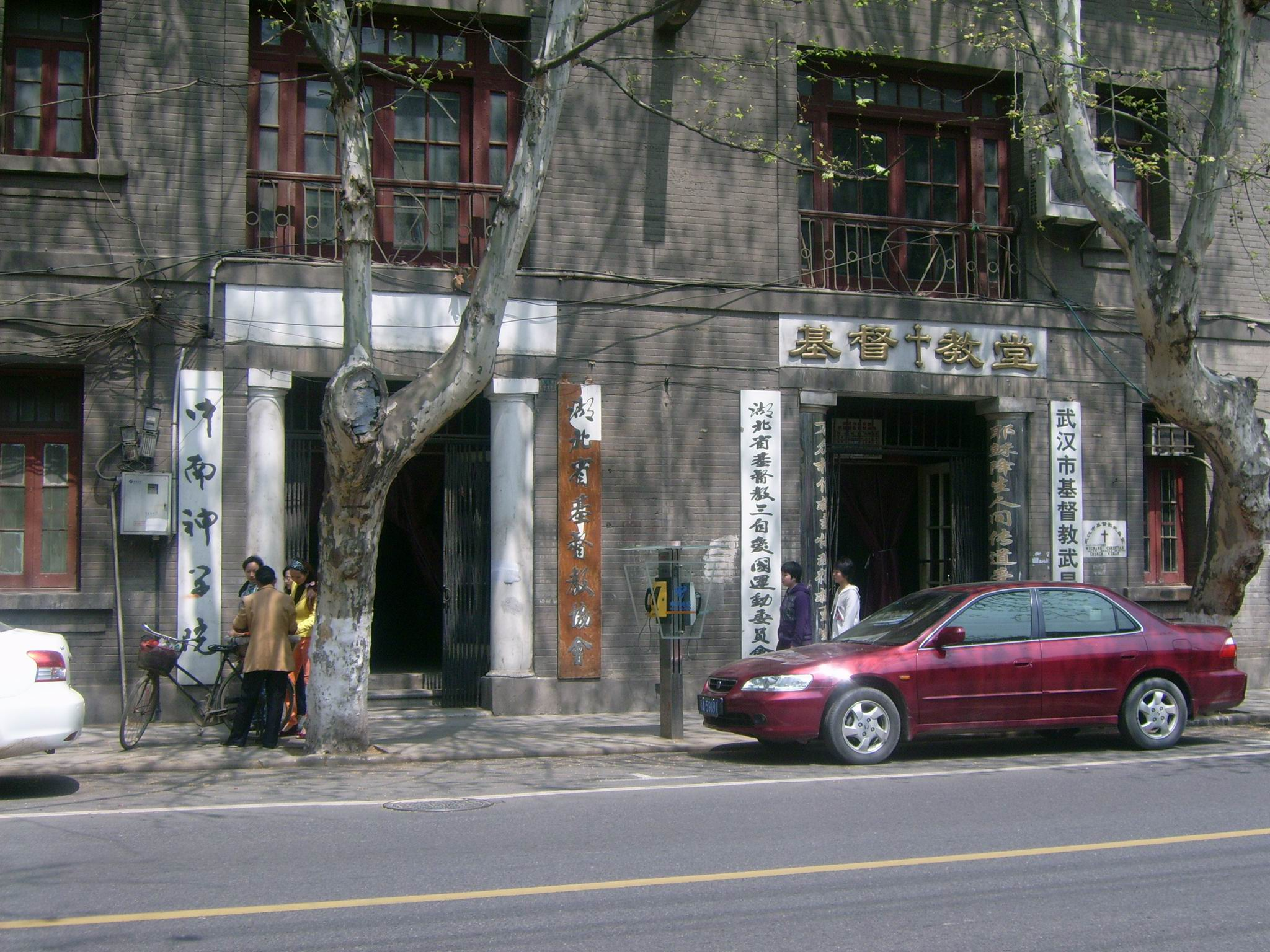
Old campus of Zhongnan Theological Seminary

The Zhongnan Theological Seminary (simplified Chinese: 中南神学院; traditional Chinese: 中南神學院; pinyin: Zhōngnán Shénxuéyuàn), or Central South Theological Seminary, is located in Wuhan City, Hubei Province, China. It was jointly established by the Christian councils of the six provinces of Henan, Hubei, Hunan, Guangdong, Guangxi and Hainan in Central South China in 1985. The students come from the relevant provinces as well.

== History ==
In 1985 Zhongnan Theological Seminary was founded as a regional hub serving the provinces of Hubei, Hunan, Guangdong, Guangxi, Henan and Hainan in central south China.

In 1992, the institute's journal Two Little Coins was founded. It was renamed Manna in December 1996. The journal is currently a quarterly publication with a total of 113 issues published.

In March 2019, the seminary was adjusted from being hosted by the Christian councils of the six provinces and region in Central and South China to being hosted by the Christian council of Hubei Province.

In September 2019, the school moved to its new campus at No. 221, Minzhu Road, Wuchang District, Wuhan City.

On May 21, 2021, an inauguration ceremony was held in Zhongnan Theological Seminary for the establishment of the Research Center for Sinicization of Christianity.

== Present situation ==
The programs provided by the seminary include four-year undergraduate study, two-year junior college programs, and short-term classes for further studies. Since its founding, the college has produced more than 2,000 theological graduates, including more than 1,700 bachelor's degree graduates and more than 350 associate degree graduates. They serve in churches across the Central and South regions of China. Among them, many have been ordained as pastors, some have become teachers, elders, member of the Chinese Christian Three-Self Patriotic Movement Committee and the China Christian Councils at all levels, and deputies to the National People's Congress and members of the Chinese People's Political Consultative Conferences at all levels.

The school has a faculty of 22 full-time and part-time teachers. And there is a school library with a collection of 31,000 books, a religious resource database as well as access to a digital library system. In addition, there is a research center for Sinicization of Christianity.

The governing board of the seminary include the president, executive vice president, vice president and educational supervisors.

== Address ==
No. 221, Minzhu Road, Wuchang District, Wuhan City, Hubei Province.

Phone number in China：027-88911398

== See also ==
- List of Protestant theological seminaries in China
- Nanjing Union Theological Seminary
- Yanjing Theological Seminary
- East China Theological Seminary
