= Braised intestines in brown sauce =

Traditional Chinese dish

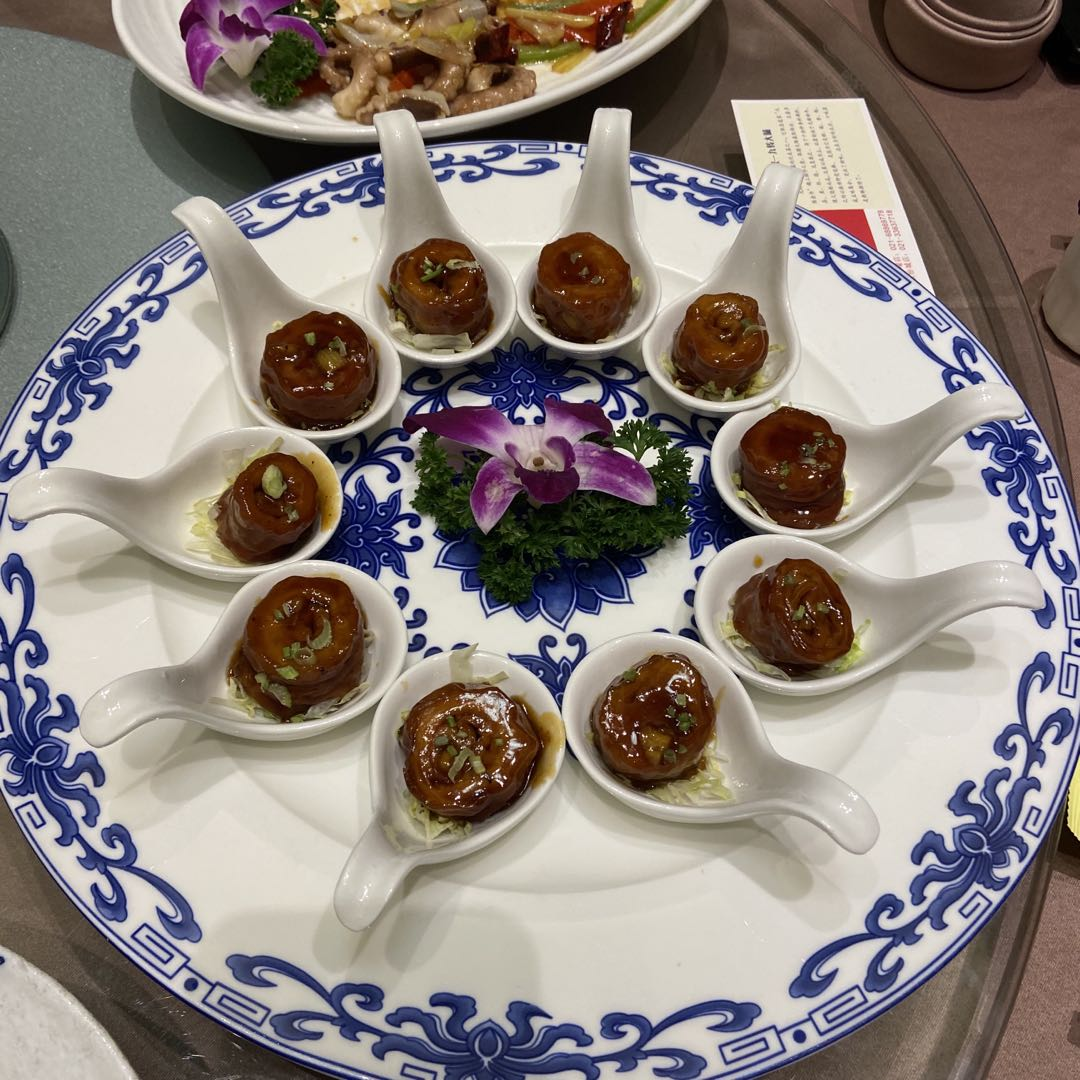
Braised Intestines in Brown Sauce

Braised intestines in brown sauce (九转大肠: nine turns of large intestine), originally called braised large intestine, is a traditional dish in Jinan City, Shandong Province. In 2020, the government designated it as a "classic" dish of Lu cuisine and "one of the most famous dishes in Shandong". It is one of the most well-known dishes of Shandong.

Shandong cuisine is one of eight major traditional cuisines of China. The dish was created by the owner of Jiuhualou Restaurant in Jinan in the late 1800s. After blanching pork intestines, it will be sour, sweet, fragrant, spicy, salty, soft, tender, and with a rosy color.

== Origin ==
According to legend, nine turns of large intestine is a dish created by Jiuhualou Hotel in Jinan in the late 1800s. It was called braised large intestine at first. After many small changes, the taste of braised large intestine has been further improved. Many celebrities were prepared a dish of "braised large intestine" when they hosted a banquet in this restaurant. After some literati tasted it, they felt that this dish was indeed delicious and unique.

== Characteristics ==
After cooking, the color of nine turns of large intestine becomes ruddy. Its whole body is translucent and flexible. Also, it has several layers and each of the layers is fresh and palatable. It tastes sour, sweet, fragrant, spicy and salty.

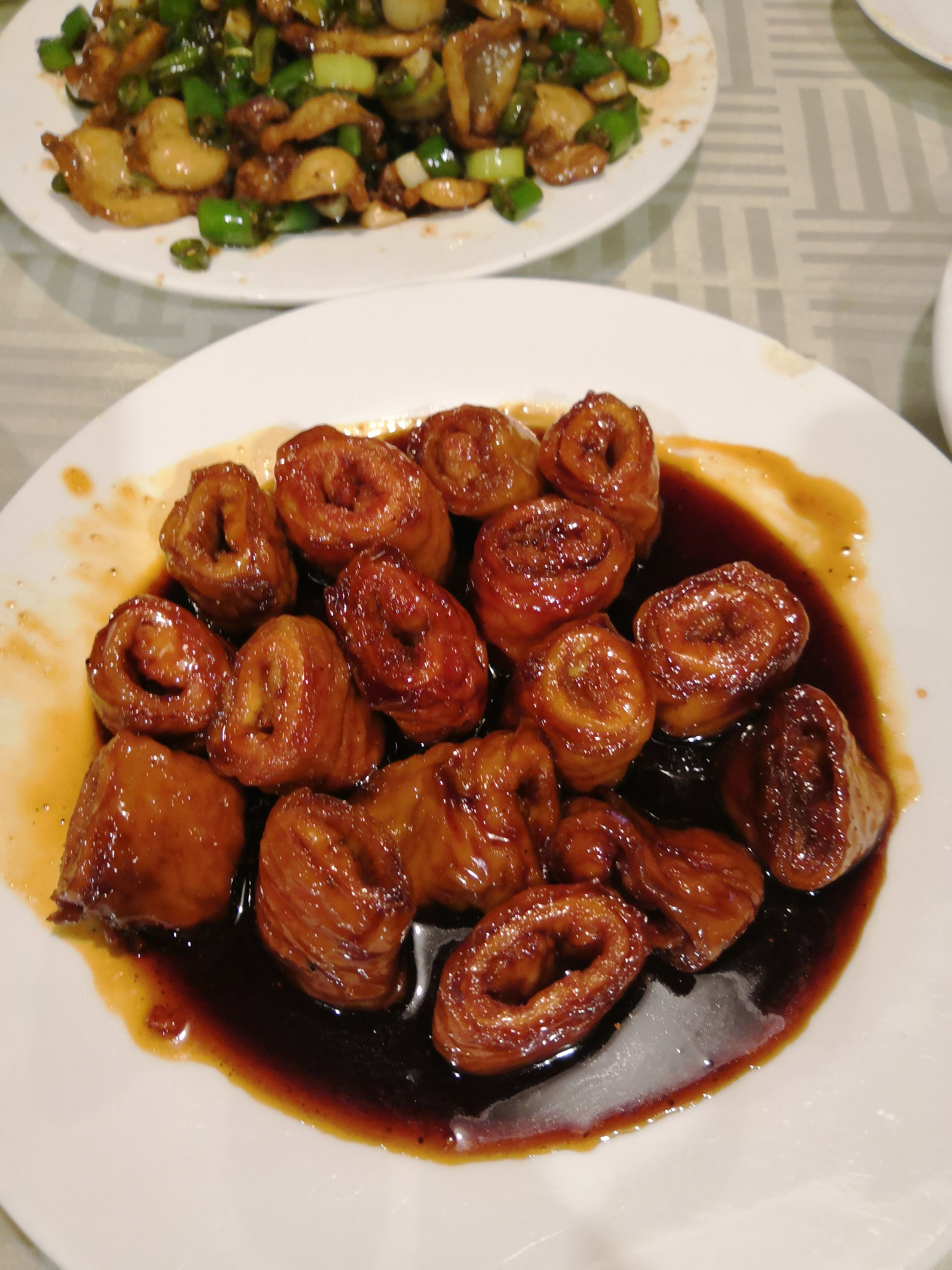
Homemade Braised Intestines in Brown Sauce

== Honor ==
On September 10, 2018, "Chinese Cuisine" was officially released. Nine turns of large intestine was selected as one of the top ten classic dishes in Shandong cuisine.
