= East China Theological Seminary =

East China Theological Seminary, or Huadong Theological Seminary (simplified Chinese: 华东神学院; traditional Chinese: 華東神學院; pinyin: Huádōng Shénxuéyuàn), is a Christian institution jointly established by four provinces and one city in 1985. It is located in Shanghai and serves as the regional educational hub for the churches in East China.

== History ==
East China Theological Seminary was established in September 1985. It is a regional seminary jointly established by the Christian Councils of Shandong Province, Jiangxi Province, Zhejiang Province, Fujian Province and Shanghai City. It mainly recruits young Christians with high school education and above. The purpose is to cultivate clergy with theological attainments and comprehensive development of "spiritually, morally, intellectually, physically, socially and aesthetically" for the Christian churches in East China.

Before the establishment of East China Theological Seminary, a board of directors was established. The board of directors held its first meeting in Shanghai in March 1985 and elected Qi Qingcai as chairman. The board of directors also passed the "Articles of Association of East China Theological Seminary", which stipulated that the seminary would be located in Shanghai, with a three-year theological college system. The first class of students were enrolled in September 1985. In 1988, the school was promoted into a four-year undergraduate college.

East China Theological Seminary was at first located in Shanghai Huai'en Church, moved to Mu'en Church in August 1986, and moved to No. 71 Wuyuan Road in July 1989. In 1996, the school purchased a piece of land in Huancheng Town, Qingpu County to build a new campus. The foundation stone was laid on October 28, 1996. In 2000, the seminary moved to the new campus in Qingpu.

== Current situation ==
East China Theological Seminary is one of the five major regional theological schools of the Chinese Protestant Church. The current chair of the board of directors is Rev. Xu Yulan and the president of the seminary is Rev. Xie Bingguo.

There are two full-time four-year programs (undergraduate degree in theology and undergraduate degree in sacred music), as well as two sub-degree programs. Since September 2011, the Sacred Music Program has been recruiting students from churches across the country. As of July 2021, the college has produced more than 1,500 graduates.

There are 15 full-time teachers and 28 part-time teachers. The seminary also invites guest teachers from other universities in Shanghai to teach history, music, politics, etc.

The school library has a collection of over 90,000 books and documents on Christianity in historical and modern China.

== Address ==
Lane 7270, Waiqingsong Road, Qingpu District, Shanghai.

Official website: http://www.ectssh.com/

== See also ==
- List of Protestant theological seminaries in China
- Nanjing Union Theological Seminary
- Yanjing Theological Seminary
- Zhongnan Theological Seminary
