= Fujian Theological Seminary =

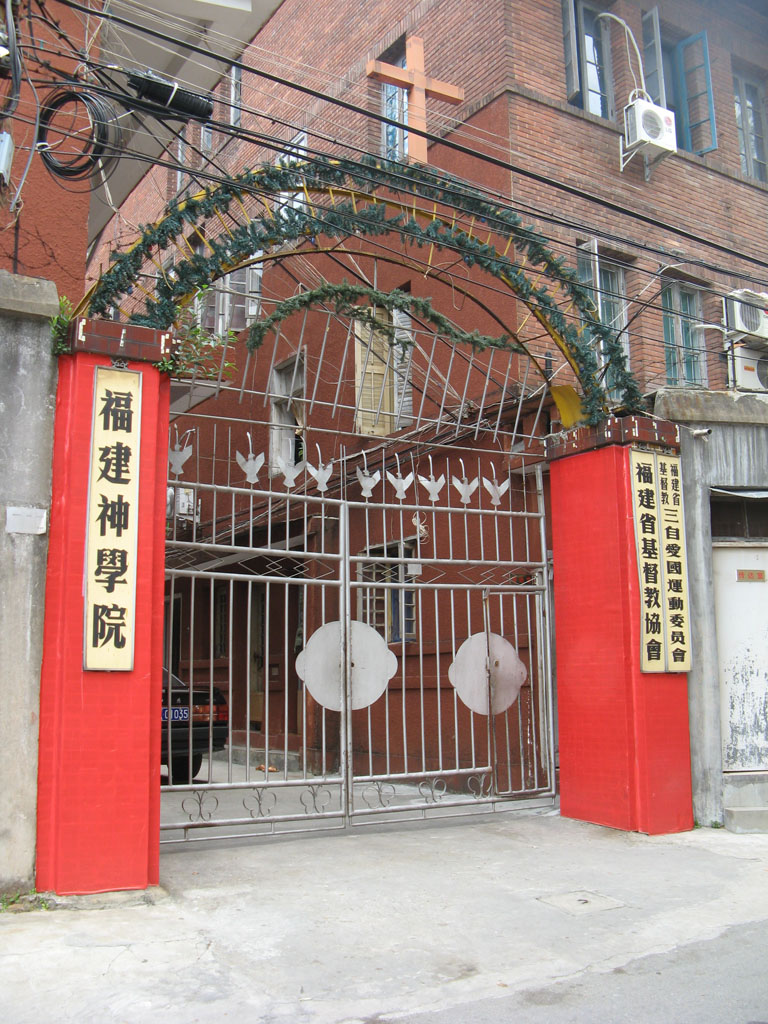
Fujian Theological Seminary

The Fujian Theological Seminary (simplified Chinese: 福建神学院; traditional Chinese: 福建神學院; pinyin: Fújiàn Shénxuéyuàn) is the major Protestant college for pastoral education in Fujian Province of China. It was founded in Fuzhou City by the Fujian Provincial Christian Council in 1983, and became the first provincial-level seminary built in China after the Cultural Revolution. The school has a tracible history of over one hundred years.

== History ==
In 1909, the Fujian Union Theological Seminary was established by the Protestant church in the Land God Temple of Cangqian Mountain in Fuzhou, capital of Fujian Province.

In 1928, the site of the seminary was converted to the Fujian Union Evangelistic College of the Methodist Episcopal Church.

In 1945, the Fujian Union Evangelistic College, the Union University, and the South China Women's College of Arts and Sciences jointly established the new Fujian Union Theological Seminary.

In 1952, Fujian Union Theological Seminary was merged into Nanjing Union Theological Seminary, and the site of the school was leased to the School of Finance and Economics of Fuzhou University.

In 1983, Fujian Theological Seminary was established in Fuzhou Huaxiang Church by the Fujian Provincial Christian Council as a 2-year junior college. It was the first provincial-level seminary built after the Cultural Revolution in China and the only seminary in the province of Fujiang. In the same year, the properties of Fujian Union Theological Seminary was returned to Fujian Theological Seminary.

In 1988, Fujian Theological Seminary moved to Lequn Road of Cangshan District, Fuzhou City.

In 2002, the seminary was upgraded to three-year junior college.

In 2014, the seminary was moved to its current location at No. 121, Fuwan Road, Cangshan District, Fuzhou City. The new campus covers an area of more than 15,000 square meters.

In 2015, the theological seminary was upgraded to an undergraduate institute offering four-year study programs.

In 2019, the seminary started its postgraduate programs in pastoral education.

== Current situation ==
Fujian Theological Seminary adheres to Sinicization of Christianity, and aims to produce pastoral talents who love both the religion and the motherland. There are both 4-year undergraduate programs and 3-year junior college programs. And postgraduate programs started in 2019. Up to 2022, the seminary has produced 2,000 graduates for churches in the province.

The campus covers an area of more than 15,000 square meters. The current president of the seminary is Rev. Yue Qinghua (from 2013- ). The faculty includes 19 full-time teachers and 29 part-time teachers. Some professors from other institutions are also invited to teach relevant courses.

The school library has a collection of over 110,000 books, and is a member library of the joint cataloging center of Fujian province.

The seminary journal Fujian Christianity serves as a communication platform for academic research by teachers and students. The school also maintains good relations with overseas churches, theological schools and institutions.

Address: No. 121, Fuwan Road, Cangshan District, Fuzhou City, Fujian Province, China.

== See also ==
- List of Protestant theological seminaries in China
- Nanjing Union Theological Seminary
