= Yanjing Theological Seminary =

Seminary in Haidian, Beijing, China

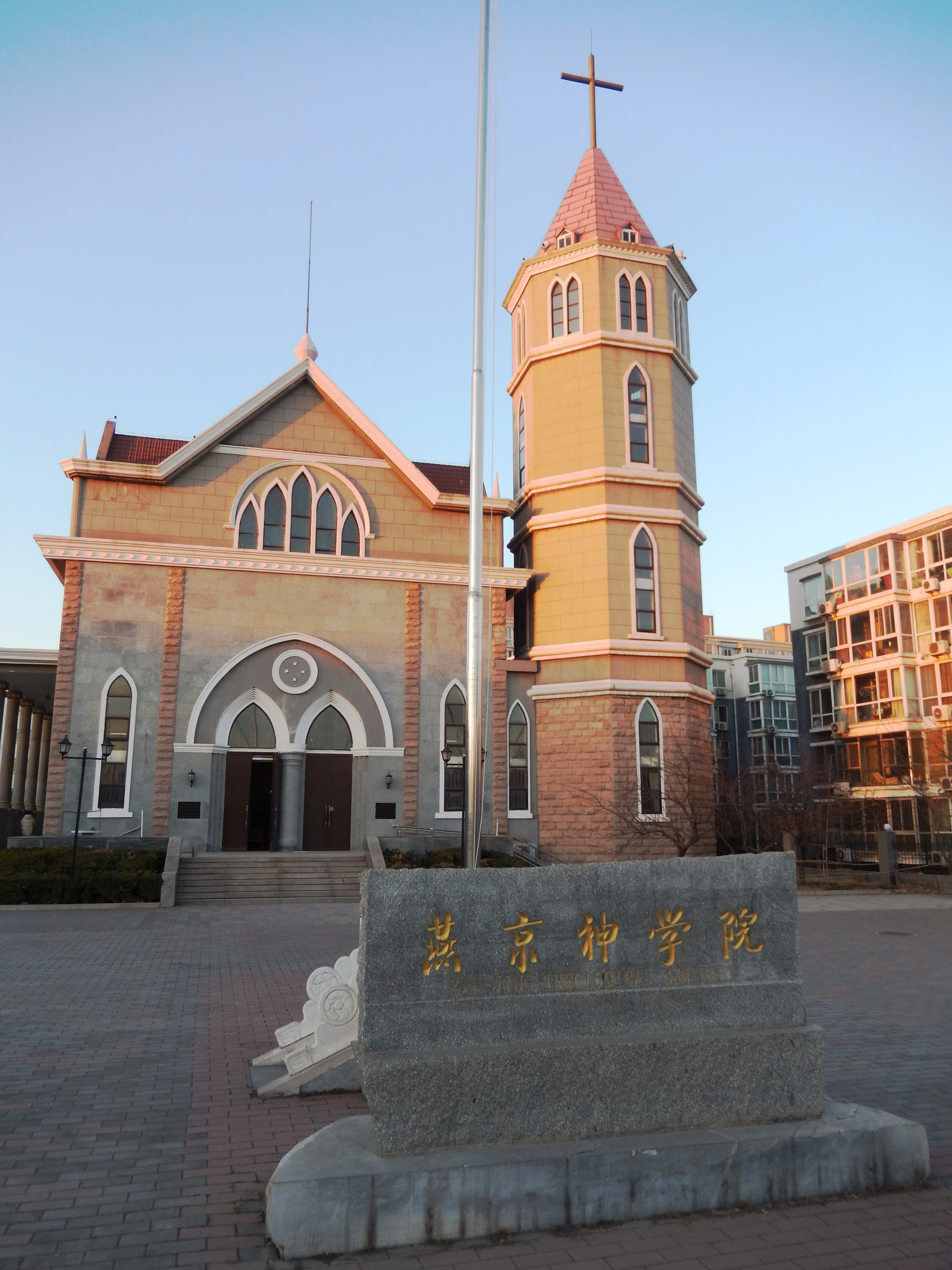
Yanjing Theological Seminary

Yanjing Theological Seminary, or Yenching Theological Seminary (simplified Chinese: 燕京神学院; traditional Chinese: 燕京神學院; pinyin: Yànjīng Shénxuéyuàn), was jointly established in 1986 by the Christian councils of Beijing, Tianjin, Hebei, Shanxi, Inner Mongolia, Shaanxi, Gansu, Ningxia, Qinghai and Xinjiang. It is the only Christian seminary in Beijing and the regional seminary which serves churches in northern and northwest China.

== History ==
In 1916, Yenching University, nothing to do with the current Peking University except the latter occupied the former's site in 1952, was founded as a Christian institution.

In 1925, the College of Divinity of the university was renamed "School of Religion of Yencheng University".

In 1950, the school became independent from the university and rernamed the Yanjin School of Religion.

In April 1953, Peking Union Theological Seminary was formed by merging the Yanjing School of Religion with Beijing Theological Seminary, North China United Women's Shengdao College and Peking Bible Seminary.

Later on, Shenyang Northeast Theological Seminary, Henan Kaifeng Baptist Huanei Theological Seminary, Holy Church Bible College, Hubei Shekou Lutheran Theological Seminary, Changsha Bible College, the Assemblies of God Aletheia College and Beijing Xiangshan Spiritual School were also merged into Peking Union Theological Seminary." Totally 11 theological schools were merged.

In 1961, the Second National Conference of Chinese Christianity decided to merge the Peking Union Theological Seminary with the Jinling Union Theological Seminary in Nanjing. Part of the Peking Union Theological Seminary was moved to Nanjing, while the other part remained in Beijing to form the Beijing Research Office of Jinling Union Theological Seminary.

During the Cultural Revolution (1966~1976), the seminary was closed.

In 1983, the Beijing Theological Seminary and Tianjin Theological Seminary were founded in the two cities.

In June 1986, the Christian councils in ten provinces, autonomous regions, and municipalities including Beijing, Tianjin, Hebei, Shanxi, Inner Mongolia, Shaanxi, Gansu, Ningxia, Qinghai, and Xinjiang jointly re-established the Yanjing Theological Seminary, by merging the Beijing Theological Seminary, Tianjin Theological Seminary and the other theological schools in the region. It became one of the five major regional theological schools of the Chinese Protestant Church. The joint seminary was located at No. 43, Dongdan North Street, Dongcheng District, Beijing.

In 1992, Yenjing Theological Seminary built a new campus near Qinghe Town, Haidian District, Beijing, covering an area of 30 mu (land). In September 1997, the students of the seminary completed their relocation to the new campus.

In 2004, the seminary completed the construction of Qinghe church. The new church is in the architectural style of the Teng Shih K'ou Congregational Church, a historical famous church in Beijing.

On June 19, 2023, the Yenjing Theological Seminary church was officially registered as a "gathering point". Its main function is to provide church practice and Sunday worship for the students on campus, carry out Christian religious activities, and at the same time serve the surrounding believers and lead them on the path of loving the country and the religion.

== Present situation ==
Yenjing Theological Seminary offers four-year undergraduate programs with compulsory subjects including biblical theology, systematic theology, historical theology and practical theology, as well as elective subjects including Chinese literature, philosophy and music.

The seminary has totally graduated more than 1,100 theological students, many of whom have become church leaders.

There are 16 full-time teachers and a library with a collection of about 40,000 paper books as well as digital resources of Logos, Allege Theological Digital Library and China National Knowledge Infrastructure (CNKI). The current president of the seminary is Rev. Wu Weiqing.

The seminary publishes "燕京神学志" (Yanjing Theological Chronicles) to serve as an academic platform for theological exchanges.

In addition to theological education, the seminary is also involved in social care activities, including medical services and charity works.

== Address ==
Yanjing Theological Seminary is located at No. 181, Qinghe Road, Qinghe Town, Haidian District, Beijing.

== See also ==
- Nanjing Union Theological Seminary
- East China Theological Seminary
- Zhongnan Theological Seminary
- List of Protestant theological seminaries in China
