= Expo 2006 (Shenyang, China) =

2006 horticultural exhibition in Shenyang, China

Shenyang China International Horticultural Exposition

Overview
- BIE-class: Unrecognized exposition
- Name: Shenyang China International Horticultural Exposition
- Area: 246 hectares
- Visitors: 3.5 million

Location
- Country: China
- City: Shenyang
- Coordinates: 41.86032°N 123.64761°E

Timeline
- Awarded: September 2004
- Opening: May 1, 2006
- Closure: October 31, 2006

Expo 2004 Shenyang, officially the Shenyang China International Horticultural Exposition 2006 (2006中国沈阳世界园艺博览会) was a horticultural exhibition recognised by the International Association of Horticultural Producers (as AIPH class A2/B1) (Note: A horticultural exhibition with international participation lasting between 3 and 6 months and at least 25 Hectares in size) in Shenyang, China

The exposition was originally approved in September 2004.

The exposition was held at the Qipanshan Mountain International Scenery and Tourism Development Zone, a recreation resort east of Shenyang, and extended from May 1 to October 31, 2006. It took up some 246 hectares, larger than any previous international horticultural exposition. Organizers said the exposition was "the only international horticultural garden in the forest." The exposition comprised four major structures, three landscape zones, and 100 smaller gardens. The structures included the 72-metre sculpture "Wing of Phoenix", a Rose Garden greenhouse of 3,300 roses, the 125-metre "Tower of Lily", and the main exhibition hall with 12,000 square metres of space.

The exposition had some 3.5 million attendees. Security was provided by the Armed Police Liaoning Contingent.
