= T. C. Chao =

Chinese Protestant theologian (1888–1979)

The Reverend T. C. Chao
- 趙紫宸
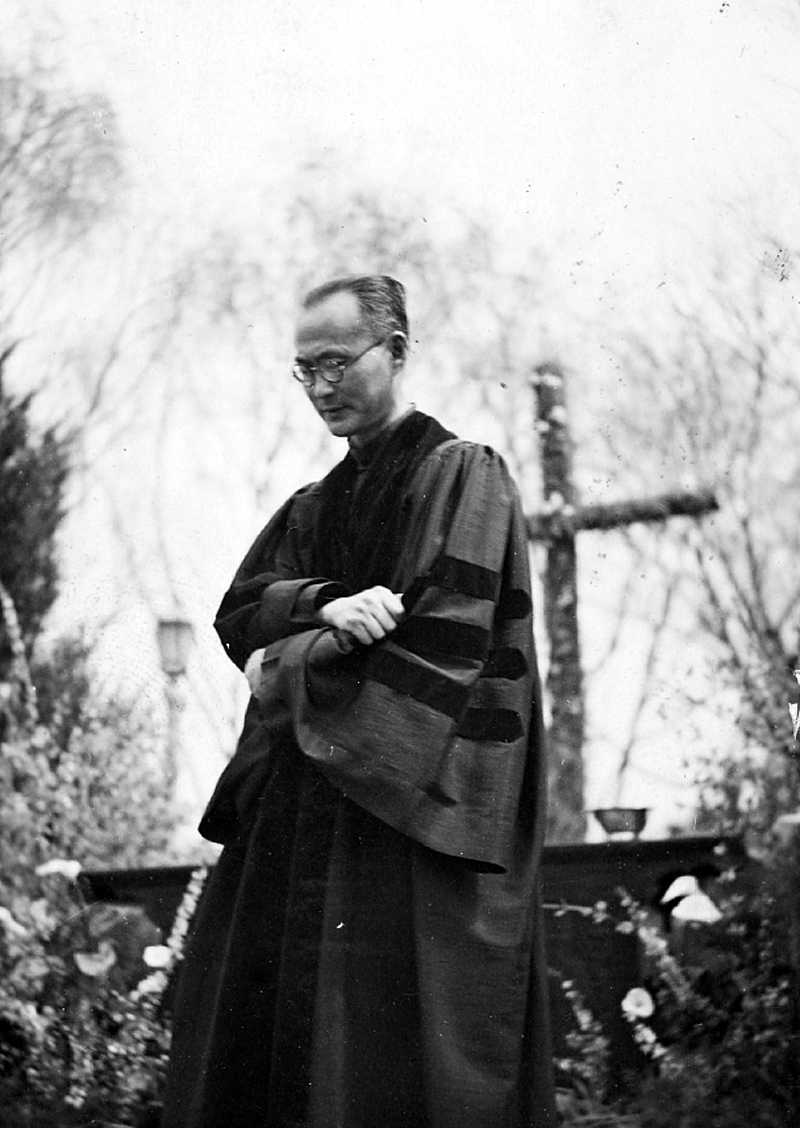
- Born: Tzu-ch'en Chao; February 14, 1888; Xinshi, Huzhou, Zhejiang, China
- Died: November 21, 1979 (aged 91); Beijing, China
- Spouse: Tong Dingzhen (m. 1905)

Ecclesiastical career
- Religion: Christianity (Methodist · Anglican)

Academic background
- Education: Soochow University; Vanderbilt University
- Influences: Borden Parker Bowne

Academic work
- Discipline: Philosophy; theology
- Institutions: Yenching University

Tzu-ch'en Chao (simplified Chinese: 赵紫宸; traditional Chinese: 趙紫宸; pinyin: Zhào Zǐchén; 1888–1979), also known as T. C. Chao, was one of the leading Protestant theological thinkers in China in the early twentieth century.

== Life ==
Chao was born on February 14, 1888, in Xinshi, Deqing County, Zhejiang, China. In 1903, at the age of fifteen, he chose to pursue a Western-style education, and enrolled in a secondary school affiliated with Soochow University. He was admitted to the university a few years later.

In 1905, Chao married Tong Dingzhen (童定珍), who was two years older than him. The couple had four children: Lucy (Chinese: 赵萝蕤; pinyin: Zhao Luorui), Timothy (Chinese: 赵景心; pinyin: Zhao Jingxin), Edward (Chinese: 赵景德; pinyin: Zhao Jingde), and Walter (Chinese: 赵景伦; pinyin: Zhao Jinglun).

In 1907, while attending university, Chao chose to be baptized as a Christian. He graduated from Soochow University in 1910. In 1914, he went to the United States to study at Vanderbilt University. He graduated in 1917 with a Master of Arts degree in sociology and a Bachelor of Divinity degree.

Chao was well known for his academic work as a professor of religious philosophy and dean at Yenching University (1928-1951). In 1948, the first general assembly of the World Council of Churches elected him as one of its six presidents. However, he resigned the post in 1950 in protest against the council's stand on the Korean War.

When the Three-Self Patriotic Movement was launched, Chao was one of the 40 church leaders who signed the "Christian Manifesto". In the 1950s, he began to express anti-American sentiments publicly. However, he was accused of siding with the Americans by the Communist government in 1956 and was only rehabilitated in 1979, a few months before his death.

Chao died on November 21, 1979.

== Theology ==
Chao is regarded by many as the leading Chinese theologian of the twentieth century. According to Gareth Jones, Chao converted from Methodism to Anglicanism on 20 July 1941, when Bishop Ronald Hall confirmed and also ordained him as both a deacon and priest all on the same day. The reason for his commitment to Anglicanism was due to "the deep appreciation of the ecclesial vocation".

During the anti-Christian movement of the 1920s, Chao advised Chinese Christians to remove the Western husk from Christianity in order to discover the true essence of the religion. A truly indigenous Christianity, Chao argued, would be a useful basis for social reconstruction in China. In later years, he became more conservative in faith, especially after his imprisonment by the Japanese for several months in 1942. Chao reconciled himself to the new Communist government in Beijing after 1949.

These changes in the sociopolitical context would be reflected in Chao's theology, especially in his view of Christ, which moved from a more liberal starting point to a conservative one that addressed questions of human and societal sin.

== See also ==
- Protestant missions in China
- Wu Leichuan
