= Lucy Chao =

Chinese poet and translator

- 趙蘿蕤
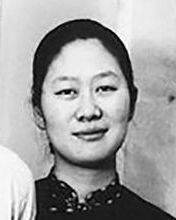
- Chao in 1949
- Born: May 9, 1912; Xinshi, Deqing County, Zhejiang, China
- Died: January 1, 1998 (aged 85)
- Other name: Zhao Luorui
- Education: University of Chicago
- Known for: Poetry and translations
- Spouse: Chen Mengjia
- Father: T. C. Chao

Chinese name
- Traditional Chinese: 趙蘿蕤
- Simplified Chinese: 赵萝蕤
Transcriptions
Standard Mandarin
- Hanyu Pinyin: Zhào Luóruí
- Wade–Giles: Chao Lo-jui

Lucy Chao, or Zhao Luorui (simplified Chinese: 赵萝蕤; traditional Chinese: 趙蘿蕤; pinyin: Zhào Luóruí; Wade–Giles: Chao Lo-jui; May 9, 1912 – January 1, 1998), was a Chinese poet and translator.

== Biography ==
Chao was born on May 9, 1912, in Xinshi, Deqing County, Zhejiang, China.

She married Chen Mengjia, an anthropologist and expert on oracle bones, in 1932. In 1944, Chao and Chen were awarded a joint fellowship by the Rockefeller Foundation to study at the University of Chicago in the United States. Chao earned her PhD from the institution in 1948 for a dissertation on Henry James. Afterward, she returned to China to teach English and North American literature at Yenching University, Beijing.

Chao's husband Chen opposed the government's proposal to simplify Chinese writing in the 1950s and was labeled a Rightist and an enemy of the Communist Party. He was sent to a labor camp in 1957. After he returned, he was banned from publishing research and committed suicide after denunciation and persecution during the Cultural Revolution.

After Chen's death, Chao developed schizophrenia. In spite of this, she created the first complete Chinese translation of Walt Whitman's Leaves of Grass, which was published in 1991. That same year, she was awarded the University of Chicago's "Professional Achievement Award".

== Works ==
Chao translated T. S. Eliot's The Waste Land in 1937, and Longfellow's The Song of Hiawatha, and eventually saw a mass publication of her translation of the whole of Whitman's Leaves of Grass in 1991. She was a co-editor of the first Chinese-language History of European Literature (1979).

== Sources ==
- Hessler, Peter (2007). Oracle Bones. New York, NY: Harper Perennial. ISBN 978-0-06-082659-8.
- Wu, Ningkun; Li, Yikai (1993). A Single Tear. New York, NY: Atlantic Monthly Press. ISBN 0-87113-494-2.
- Wu, Ningkun (2007). "一代才女赵萝蕤教授". 中外书摘. 2007 (10).
