= Bai & Yun Art Museum =

Bai & Yun Art Museum 白云美术馆
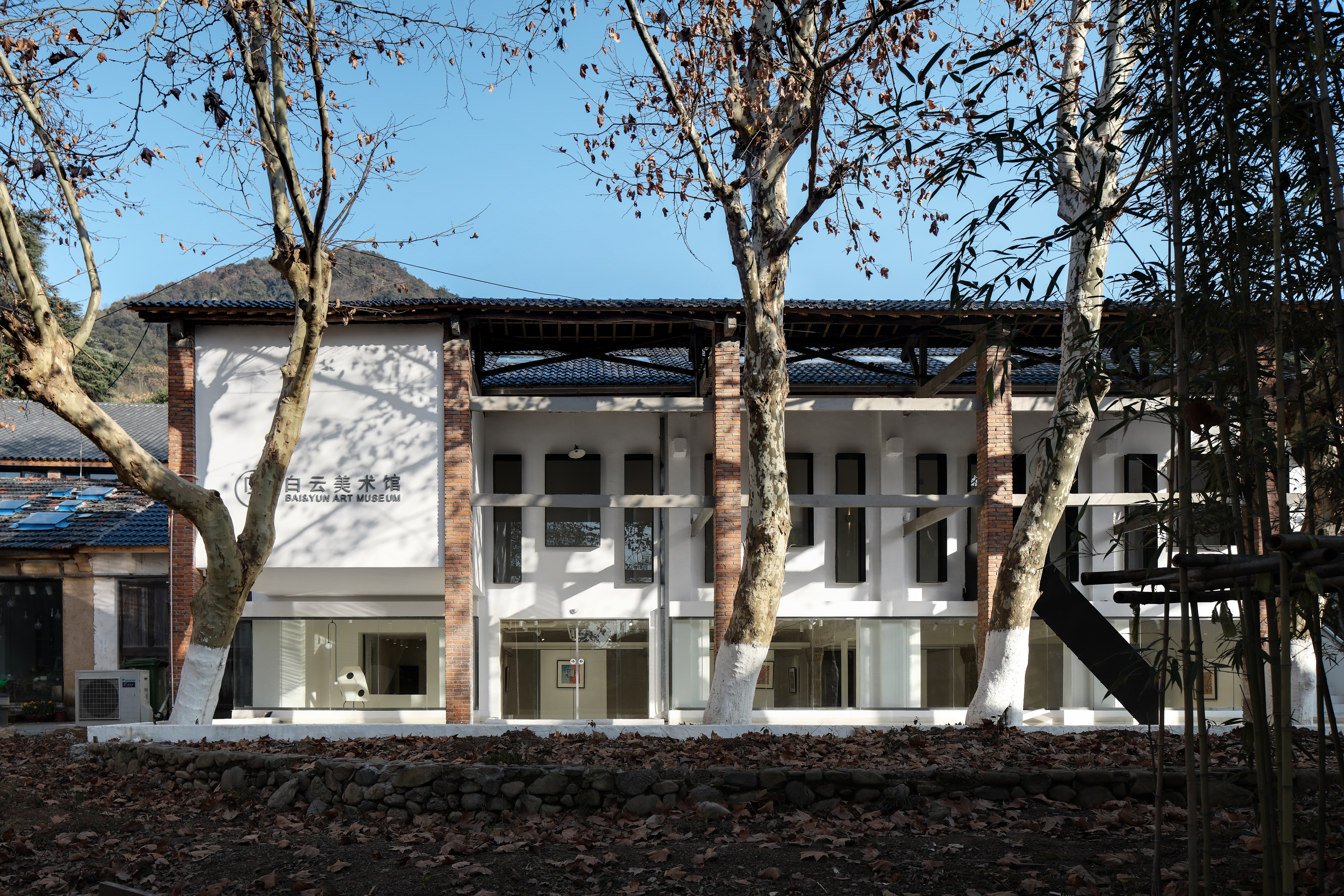

- Location within Zhejiang Location within China
- Established: 2017
- Location: No. 48 Huangqin West Road, Moganshan Town, Deqing County, Zhejiang Province, China
- Coordinates: 30.36°N 119.52°E
- Type: art museum

The Bai & Yun Art Museum (Simplified Chinese: 白云美术馆) is located at Moganshan, Deqing County, Zhejiang Province. Constructed in a neo-Chinese style, it serves as a contemporary art museum and houses the Bai & Yun Moganshan Air Art Foundation.

The museum was founded by Liangjun Miao, with Jiadong Mi and Jie Kang as co-founders in 2017. The museum functions not only as an art exhibition space but also as an artist community. Since its opening, it has hosted numerous domestic and international exhibitions, attracting artists from China and abroad.

== Exhibitions ==
Lao Mai、Thomas Garnier、Olimpia Velasco、Kristoffer Kullengren、Craig Easton、Shi Bin、Chen Xiaodan、Gu Zhongsheng、Zhuang Ying、Zhao Heimao、DeYi Studio and others.
