= Qinghe =

Qinghe may refer to:

== Disaster ==
- Qinghe Special Steel Corporation disaster, a disaster in Tieling, Liaoning

== Locations in China ==
County-level subdivisions

- Qinghe County, Hebei (清河县), Xingtai, Hebei
- Qinggil County, or Qinghe County (青河县), in Altay Prefecture, Xinjiang
- Qinghe District, Tieling (清河区), Liaoning
- Qinghe District, Huai'an (清河区), Jiangsu

Subdistricts

- Qinghe Subdistrict, Cao County (青菏街道), in Cao County, Shandong

Written as "清河街道":

- Qinghe Subdistrict, Beijing, in Haidian District, Beijing
- Qinghe Subdistrict, Fuyang, in Yingzhou District, Fuyang, Anhui
- Qinghe Subdistrict, Changchun, in Chaoyang District, Changchun, Jilin
- Qinghe Subdistrict, Fuxin, in Qinghemen District, Fuxin, Liaoning

Towns

- Qinggil Town (青河镇), seat of Qinggil (Qinghe) County, Xinjiang

Written as "清河镇"

- Qinghe, Tonghe County, Harbin, Heilongjiang
- Qinghe, Ji'an, Jilin
- Qinghe, Huimin County, Shandong
- Qinghe, Yutai County, Shandong
- Qinghe, Jishan County, Shanxi
- Qinghe, Dazhu, Sichuan

Townships (清河乡)

- Qinghe Township, Huaining County, Anhui
- Qinghe Township, Nehe, Heilongjiang
- Qinghe Township, Tongjiang City, Heilongjiang
- Qinghe Township, Fangcheng County, Henan
- Qinghe Township, Zhongjiang County, Sichuan

Other

- Qinghe Commandery (清河郡) in imperial China
- Qing River (Beijing) (清河)
- Qinghe railway station (清河站), Beijing
- Qinghe Bridge in Deqing County, Zhejiang, China
