= Sengjia Bridge =

Sengjia Bridge 僧家桥
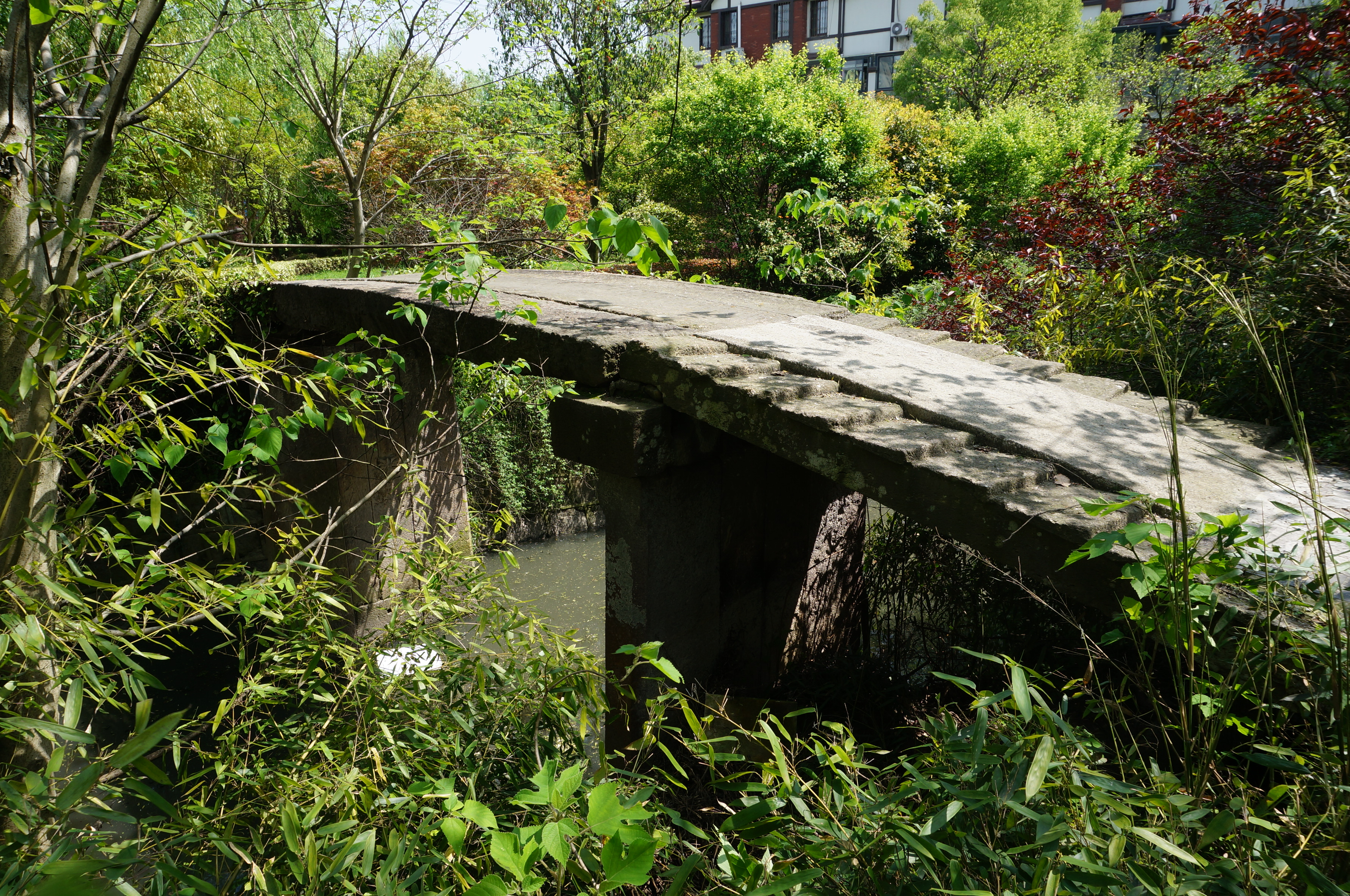
- Sengjia Bridge in April 2016
- Coordinates: 30°32′37″N 120°00′17″E
- Carries: Pedestrians
- Crosses: Longxi Stream
- Locale: Wukang Subdistrict, Deqing County, Zhejiang, China

Characteristics
- Design: Bridge
- Material: Stone
- Total length: 11.1 metres (36 ft)
- Width: 2.12 metres (6 ft 11 in)
- Height: 2 metres (6 ft 7 in)
- Longest span: 5 metres (16 ft)

History
- Construction end: 743
- Rebuilt: 1226

The Sengjia Bridge (simplified Chinese: 僧家桥; traditional Chinese: 僧家橋; pinyin: Sēngjiā Qiáo) is a historic stone bridge over the Longxi Stream in Wukang Subdistrict, Deqing County, Zhejiang, China.

== History ==
Sengjia Bridge was first built in 743 during the Tang dynasty (618–907), and was rebuilt in 1226 during the reign of Emperor Lizong of the Song dynasty (960–1279).

In March 2005, it has been inscribed as a provincial-level cultural heritage site by the Government of Zhejiang.

== Gallery ==
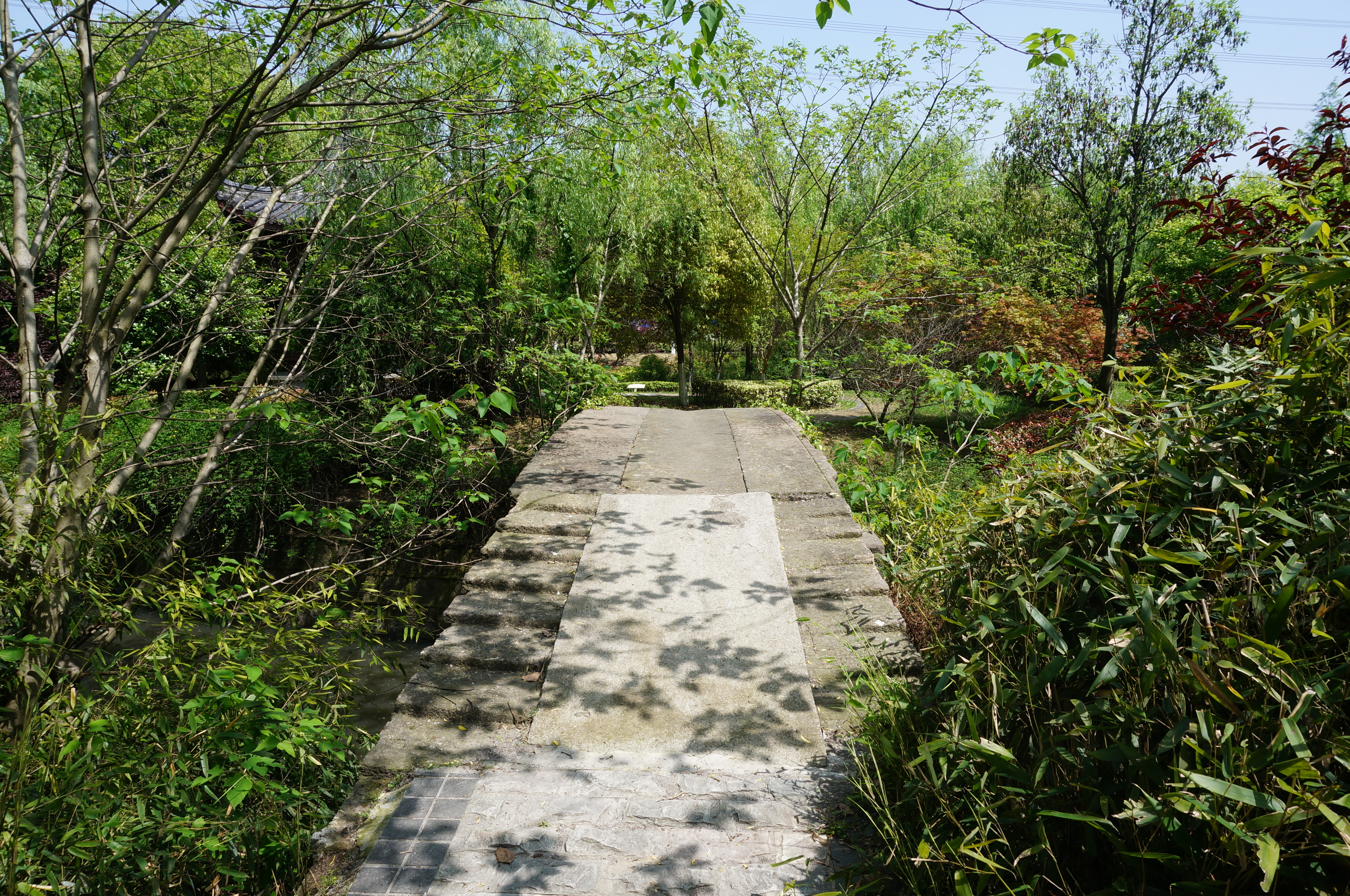
Sengjia Bridge in April 2016

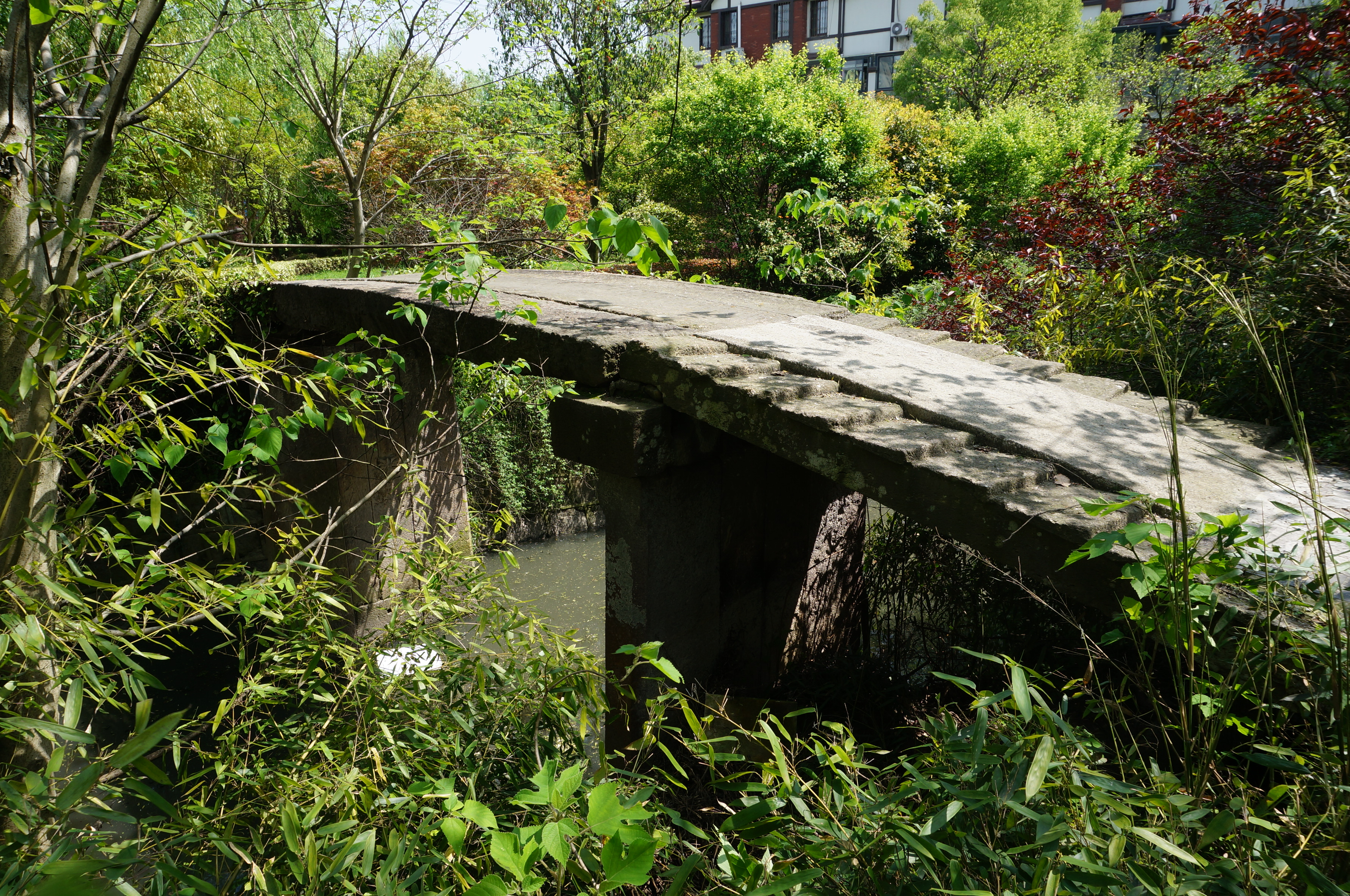
Sengjia Bridge in April 2016

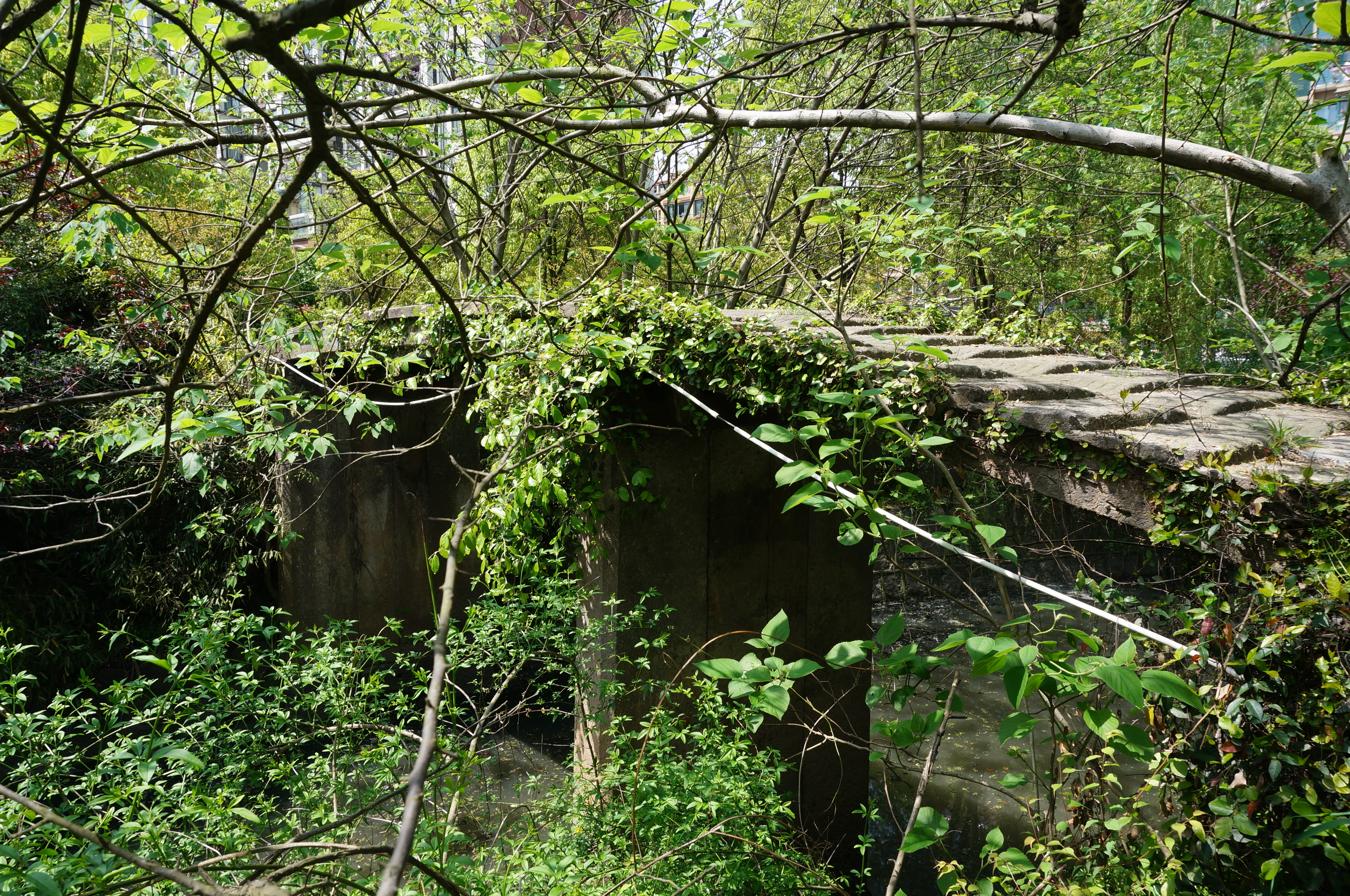
Sengjia Bridge in April 2016
