= Siberian Serpentarium =

Soviet-Russian serpentine farm

- Founded: 1989
- Headquarters: Novosibirsk, Russia
- Products: Snake venom, medications
- Website: www.sibserpent.com

Siberian Serpentarium or Siberian Herpetological Centre is a serpentine farm producing snake venom and snake venom medications. It was founded in 1989 in Novosibirsk, USSR. It is the only serpentarium in Russia, and it is the world's largest producer of snake venom.

== Activities ==
The activities conducted by the serpentarium are:

- biological research
- breeding of vipers
- extraction of snake venom

The serpentarium initially used common adder found locally in the Vasyugan Swamp. Due to demand for other venoms, it also mass rears and breeds snakes from the Altai, Far East and Central Asian regions, including Halys viper, the short-tailed viper, the Brown mamushi, Vipera libetina turanika and Vipera raddei. Snakes captured from the wild may be kept in the serpentarium for up to ten years, their survival averaging over three and a half years.

=== Production ===
The centre produces about 2,000 grams of snake venom in crystal and lyophilic forms each year. It also produces snake venom medications (anti-inflammatory ointment).

== Bibliography ==
- Ламин В. А. (2003). Энциклопедия. Новосибирск. Новосибирск: Новосибирское книжное издательство. pp. 773–774. ISBN 5-7620-0968-8.
