= Mount Mogan =

Mountain in Zhejiang, China

Coordinates: 30°38′N 119°50′E

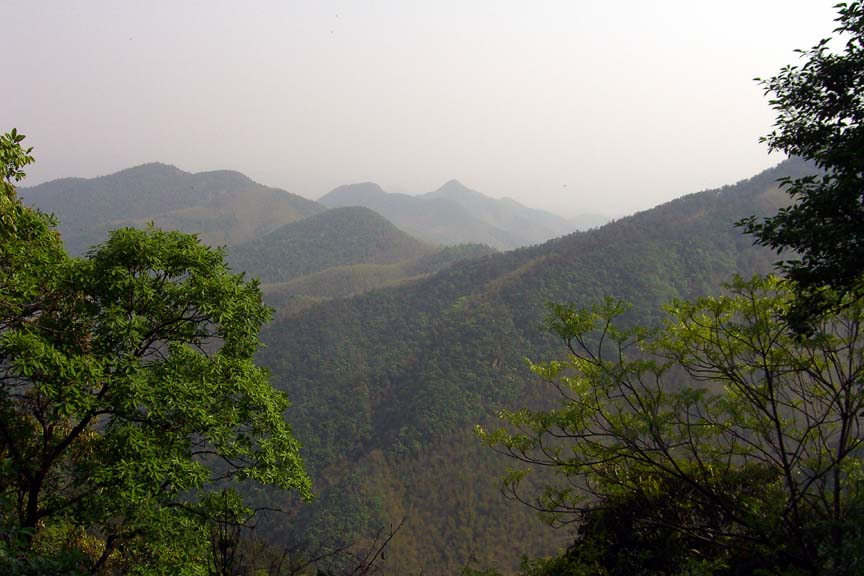
Moganshan

Mount Mogan or Moganshan (Chinese: 莫干山; pinyin: Mògān Shān) is a mountain located in Deqing County, Huzhou, Zhejiang Province, China, 60 kilometers from the provincial capital Hangzhou and 200 km from Shanghai. It is part of the Moganshan National Park and at its base is the small town of Moganshan.

Known for its cool temperatures during the region's scorching summers, it has long been the playground of the Shanghai elite. Moganshan retains a country lifestyle with a mix of local inns and old villas built early in the 20th century.

== History ==
According to Chinese legend, in the Spring and Autumn period of 770- 476 BC, China's most talented swordsmith Ganjiang, arrived in the mountains. It was here that he cast and forged a pair of special swords on the demand of the Emperor of Wu. Gan's wife was called Moye, hence the name Mogan Mountains and the main tourist attraction Sword Pond.

The crisp refreshing breezes of Mogan Mountain first enchanted foreigners in the 1880s, where rooms and houses were rented from locals. Large European style villas, houses, churches and public halls were built for missionaries, businessmen, customs officials and their families. Many of these villas and houses are still standing, with some being turned into hotels and guesthouses operating today.

By 1910 approximately 300 foreigners, mostly Americans and British, had set up summer homes on the hill. The foreigners left the mountain top with the rise of the Communist party in 1949, where the villas were handed out to different work units or "danwei's" from Hangzhou and Shanghai. Many of the villas are owned by the People's Liberation Army. Mark Kitto, the first foreigner to live on the mountain in modern times, obtained a 10-year lease from them in 2003, renovated the villa, and opened Moganshan Lodge, a restaurant and guest lodges.

In 2011, South African entrepreneur Grant Horsfield and his wife Delphine Yip opened naked Stables, which later became the first platinum-level LEED certified resort in Mainland China. It is now one of the most popular resorts in Moganshan.

== Geography ==
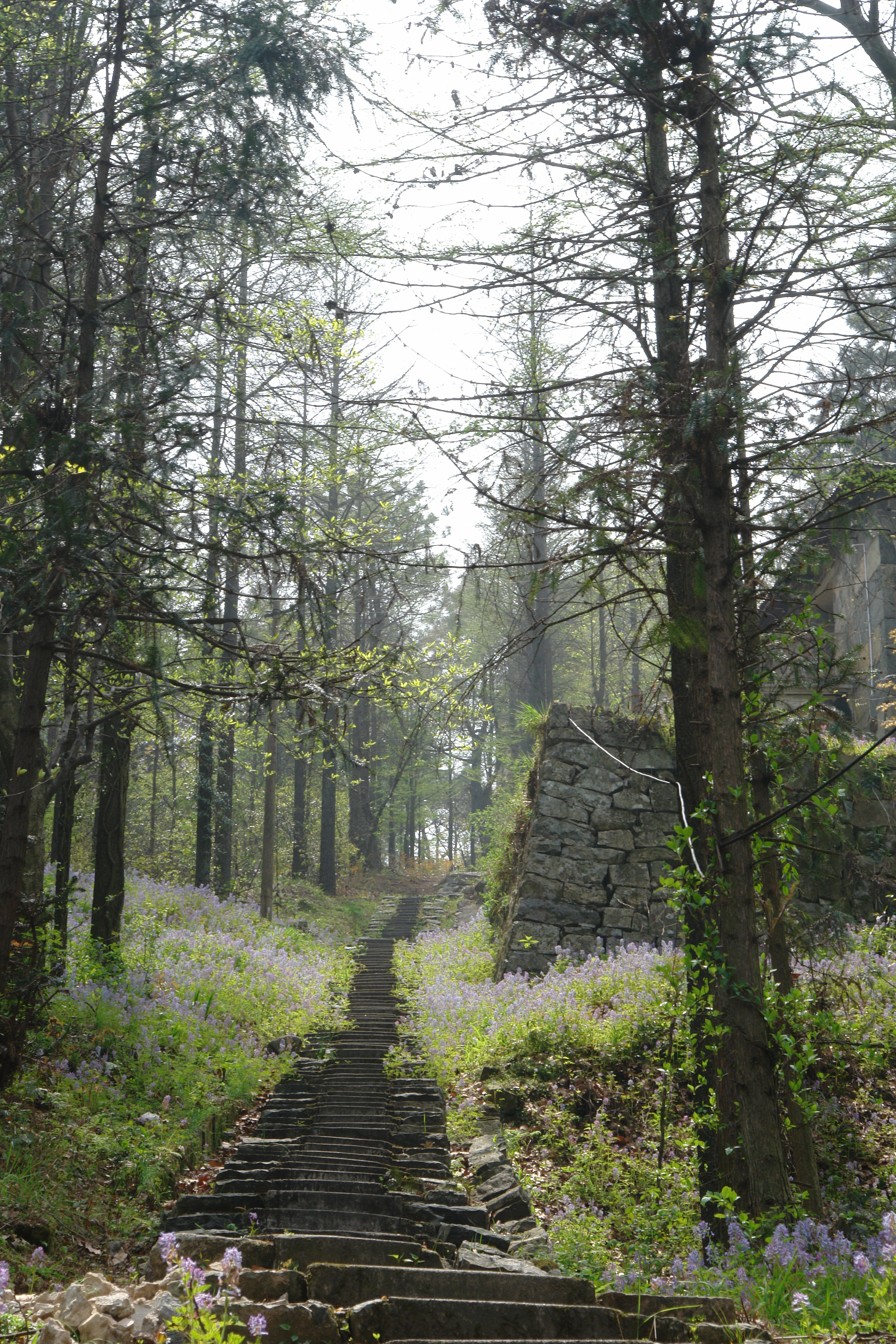
A typical steep wooded path in Moganshan

Moganshan is part of the Tianmu mountain range, with Mount Tianmu itself located some 50 kilometers (31 mi) southwest of Moganshan. Moganshan is 719 meters (2,359 ft) high.

Moganshan is a major bamboo area, with lush bamboo forests on its slopes and surrounding areas.

== Tourism Today ==
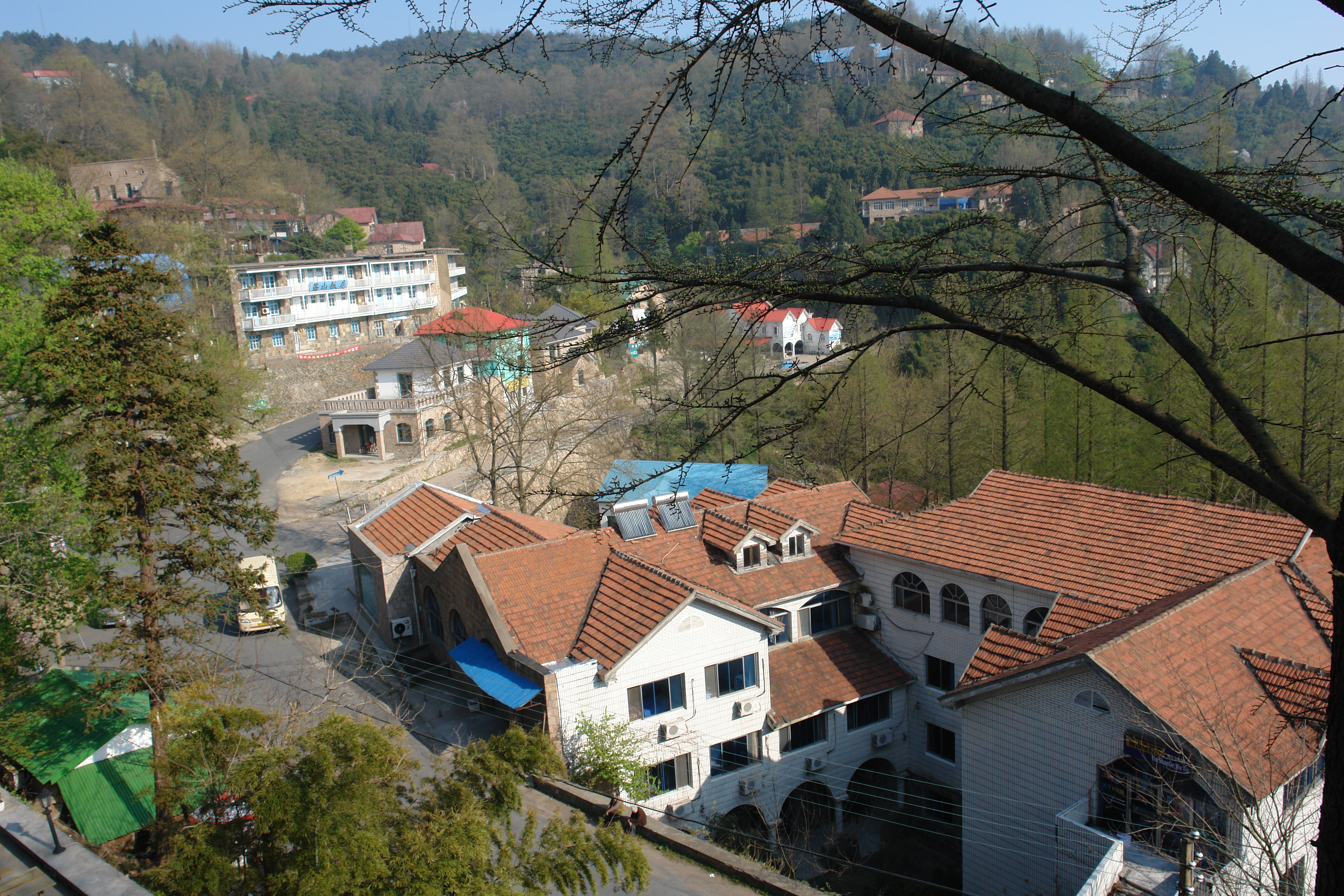
Moganshan town centre

Moganshan receives a variety of Chinese and foreign visitors for relaxation, hiking, and visiting a variety of scenic and historical spots, including the post-World War II villa of Chiang Kai-shek.

The city has a neo-Chinese Bai & Yun Art Museum.
