= Yunxiu Temple =

Buddhist temple in Zhejiang, China

- 云岫寺
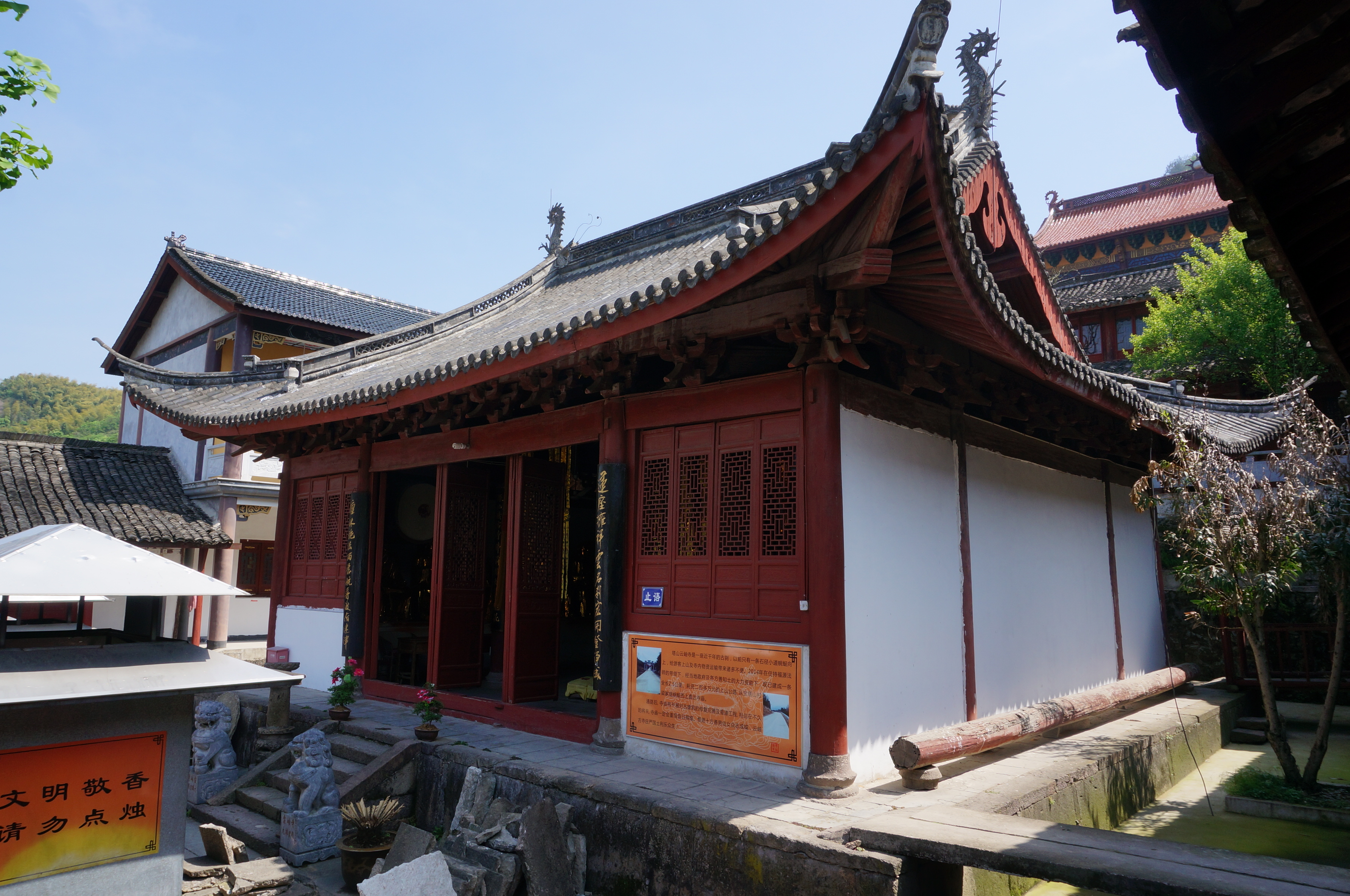
- The Mahavira Hall of Yunxiu Temple.

- Location within Zhejiang

Religion
- Affiliation: Buddhism
- Sect: Chan Buddhism

Location
- Location: Xiazhuhu Subdistrict, Deqing County, Zhejiang
- Country: China
- Coordinates: 30°31′30″N 120°00′18″E

Architecture
- Style: Chinese architecture
- Founder: Chan master Yin (音禅师)
- Established: 1181
- Completed: 1955 (reconstruction)

Yunxiu Temple (simplified Chinese: 云岫寺; traditional Chinese: 雲岫寺; pinyin: Yúnxiù Sì) is a Buddhist temple located in Xiazhuhu Subdistrict, Deqing County, Zhejiang, China.

== History ==
The original temple dates back to the year 1181, during the Song dynasty (960–1279).

It was destroyed by fire during the Mongolian invasion of the 13th century. Monk Shi Wencui (释文粹) restored and rebuilt the temple in 1345.

Yunxiu Temple was devastated in the Jiajing period (1522–1566) of the Ming dynasty (1368–1644). In the Wanli period (1573–1620), Gu Duanping (顾端屏) appropriated a large sum of money for reconstructing the temple.

A catastrophic fire destroyed most of its buildings in the Qianlong era (1735–1799) of the Qing dynasty (1644–1911). It was renovated and refurbished in 1887, that same year, abbot Guangyan (广严) came to Beijing and Guangxu Emperor granted a set of Chinese Buddhist canon to the temple.

Yunxiu Temple became dilapidated for neglect during the Republic of China (1912–1949).

In 1955, local government supervised the renovation of Yunxiu Temple. It was inscribed as a "Historical and Cultural Sites Protected at the County Level" in 1982 and was classified as a "Historical and Cultural Site Protected at the Provincial Level" in December 1989.

== Architecture ==
Now the temple has more than 40 halls and rooms. The entire complex faces the west and has an exquisite layout in the order of the Shanmen, Mahavira Hall, Hall of Guanyin (Buddhist Texts Library), and Huayan Hall (华严殿).

The Mahavira Hall is three rooms wide with single-eave gable and hip roof.
