= Chen Mengjia =

Chinese paleographer and archaeologist

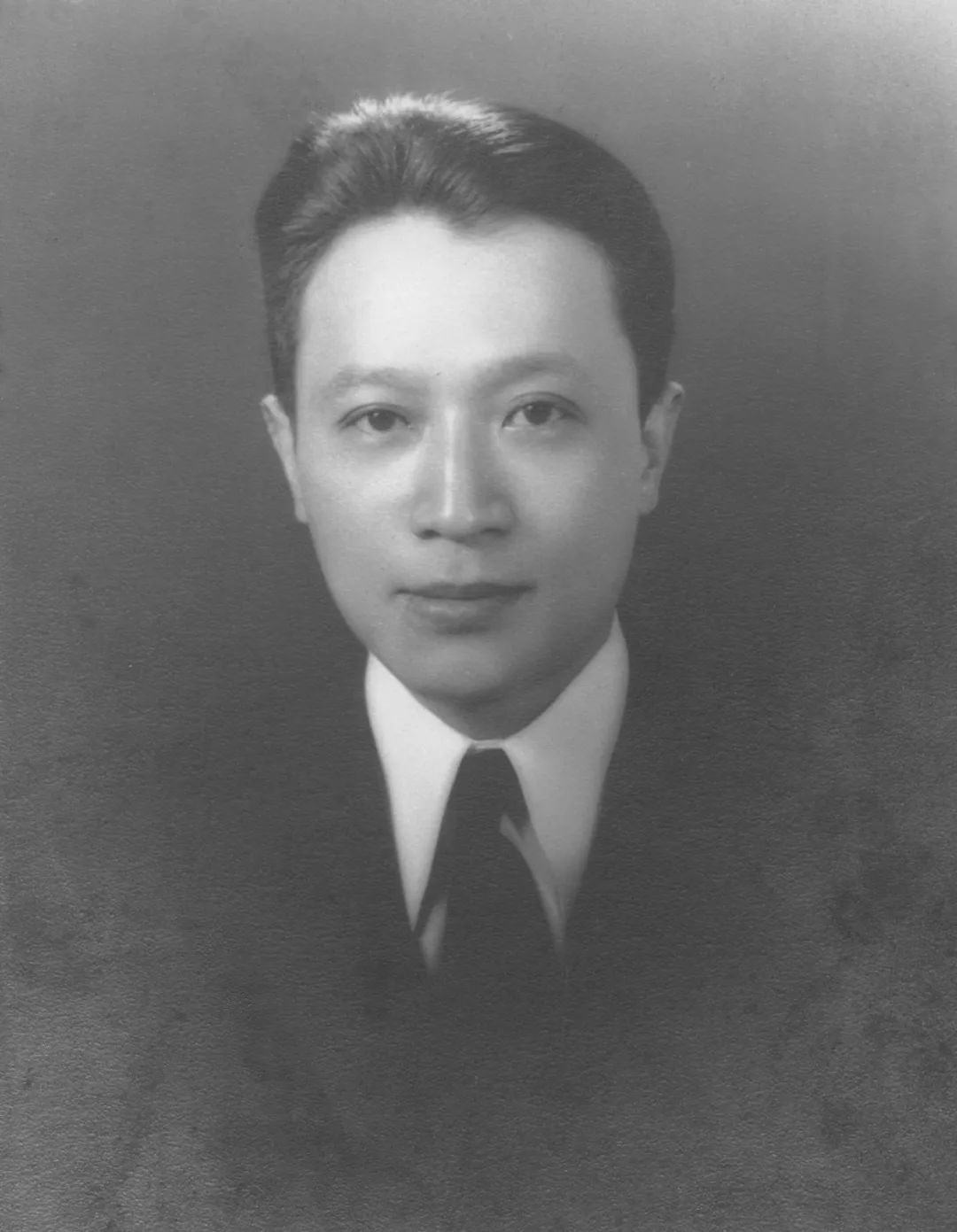
- Chen in 1947
- Born: 20 April 1911; Nanjing, China
- Died: 3 September 1966 (aged 55); Beijing, China
- Education: Yenching University
- Occupation: Archaeologist
- Known for: Research on oracle bones
- Spouse: Zhao Luorui

Chinese name
- Traditional Chinese: 陳夢家
- Simplified Chinese: 陈梦家
Transcriptions
Standard Mandarin
- Hanyu Pinyin: Chén Mèngjiā
- Wade–Giles: Ch'en Meng-chia

Chen Mengjia (simplified Chinese: 陈梦家; traditional Chinese: 陳夢家; 20 April 1911 – 3 September 1966) was a Chinese scholar, poet, paleographer, archaeologist and antiquer. He was considered the foremost authority on oracle bones and was Professor of Chinese at Tsinghua University in Beijing.

He was married to the poet and translator Zhao Luorui (aka Lucy Chao, 1912–1998). Chen committed suicide in 1966, at the beginning of the Cultural Revolution after being labeled a "capitalist intellectual" and Rightist and being persecuted by officials.

== Life ==
Chen was born and raised in Nanjing, Jiangsu province. His father was a Presbyterian minister.

In his youth Chen had been a poet, under the pen name Wanderer, his first poem was published when he was 18. He was a member of the Crescent Moon Society in Shanghai, a group of romantic poets during the early 20th century. In 1932 he joined the resistance against Japanese aggression in Shanghai during the January 28 Incident. At that time he also studied law in Nanjing, but in 1932 began to research classical Chinese literature and religion, before turning to the study of Chinese writing and archaeology at Yenching University in Beijing, where he specialised in the study of oracle bones and ancient Chinese bronzes. Chen and his wife moved to Kunming in the mid-1930s, where had a position at the National Southwest Associated University.

In 1936, Chen published an influential article on the religion and magic of the Shang dynasty, in which he compared the list of the kings of the Xia dynasty (the first dynasty of China in the traditional recorded history, often thought to be legendary) with that of the Shang dynasty that followed it, and argued that the (legendary) Xia were just a "duplication" of the (real) Shang. He also argued that the Yellow Emperor and Yu the Great were originally the same personage.

In 1944 Chen and his wife Lucy Chao were both awarded humanities fellowships by the Rockefeller Foundation to study at the University of Chicago in the United States. Chen also received financial support from the Harvard-Yenching Institute. Chen traveled around the United States, as well as making trips to Canada and Europe studying both private and public collections of ancient Chinese bronzes. He completed the project with the support of C. T. Loo, a famous art dealer. His study, with descriptions of over 850 bronze vessels, was turned into a draft for a book, possibly to be published in the United States. In 1947 Chen returned to China (his wife the following year), and he sent the manuscript to Harvard University before. After the Korean War broke out, Chen was disconnected with Harvard. However, the book remained unpublished in the United States. According to Edward L. Shaughnessy, Chen's manuscript left in Harvard has been found.

The book was eventually published in China in 1962 under the title Our country's Shang and Zhou Bronzes Looted by American Imperialists, edited by the Chinese Institute of Archaeology. Chen himself, however, did not choose the title, and indeed his name is not written on the cover. The book had been considered important to publish, even though its author was a "Rightist", who were not allowed to publish. Among the "American imperialists" listed in the book are the Saint Louis Art Museum, Mrs. W.K. Vanderbilt of New York, Miss Doris Duke of New York, Avery Brundage of Chicago, and Alfred F. Pillsbury of Minneapolis. The book is going to be republished under its original title signed with the name of Chen in China in 2016.

Before his problems with the Chinese authorities Chen published in 1956 the work A comprehensive study of the divination inscriptions from the Ruins of Yin. The inscriptions, made on oracle bones at Yin, the last Shang capital near today's Anyang (Henan), were recognized at the time (and, largely, still are) as the earliest examples of Chinese writing.

Chen Mengjia's work has long been well known to Shang scholars worldwide. His life and achievements became known to a wider audience outside China with the publication in 2006 of Peter Hessler's book Oracle Bones.

== Politics ==
In the 1950s, Chen opposed the Communist government's proposal to simplify more than 2,000 Chinese characters. After the Anti-Rightist Movement began in 1957, Chen was labeled a Rightist and an enemy of the Communist Party, and was sent to a labour camp. In 1966, at the beginning of the Cultural Revolution, he was again severely persecuted and committed suicide in Beijing.

Chen Mengjia and his wife Lucy Chao collected Chinese antiques, especially furniture. Before his suicide, Chen wrote a letter to Ma Chengyuan of the Shanghai Museum, declaring his intent to donate the furniture to the museum. However, after the deaths of the couple, Chao's brother-in-law Zhao Jingxin refused to donate the collection, instead selling it to the museum.

== Memorials ==
Wang Shixiang's magisterial book Classic Chinese Furniture: Ming and Early Qing Dynasties (the first book about Chinese classical furniture written by a Chinese author) is dedicated to Chen Mengjia, who was his good friend, and a fellow collector of Chinese classical furniture.
