= Wu Leichuan =

Chinese theologian and academic (1870–1944)

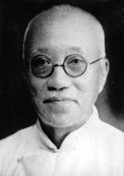
Wu Leichuan

Wu Leichuan (simplified Chinese: 吴雷川; traditional Chinese: 吳雷川; pinyin: Wú Léichuān; alt. Chinese: 吳震春; pinyin: Wu Zhenchun; 1870–1944) was a leading Chinese theologian in the early 20th century and Chancellor of Yenching University.

== Biography ==
From his childhood, Wu poured his energy into mastering the Confucian classics and working his way up through the imperial examinations, obtaining the level of Jìnshì (進士) in 1898 in Beijing after passing the metropolitan and imperial examinations. He converted to Christianity in 1915 and became Yenching University's first Chinese vice-president and chancellor between 1926 and 1934.

== Confucianism and Christianity ==
During the Anti-Christian movement of the 1920s, Wu wrote prolifically in an attempt to fuse Christian theology with Confucian concepts. He argued that important Christian values had Confucian counterparts: love as ren (仁), prayer with self-cultivation (修养), and Christmas as a time to celebrate the birthdays of Christ and Confucius. Wu also drew parallels between the Christian Bible and the Confucian Zhongyong, from the Genesis 2:7 creation account with Zhongyong chapter 1 to the Messiah of Isaiah 11:1-10 with the Zhongyong savior in chapter 31.

== See also ==
- Protestant missions in China 1807-1953
- T. C. Chao
