= Snake farm =

Place where snakes are bred

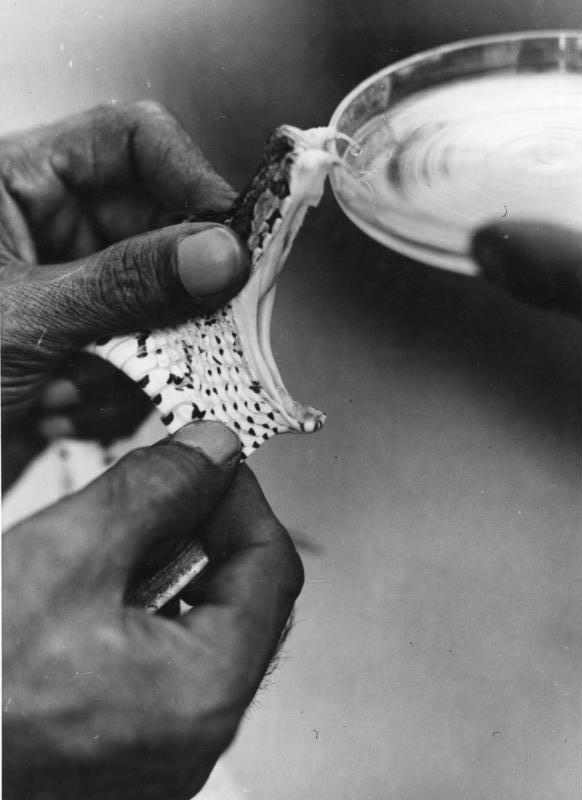
Collection of venom from a snake

A snake farm is a facility that houses and breeds a wide variety of snakes, often for the purpose of research and the collection of venom for the creation of antivenom. Many snake farms are primarily tourist attractions. Notable snake farms exist in the United States, Thailand, China, Brazil, France, Germany, Costa Rica, and Russia.

== In the United States ==
- Animal World and Snake Farm – New Braunfels, Texas

== In China ==
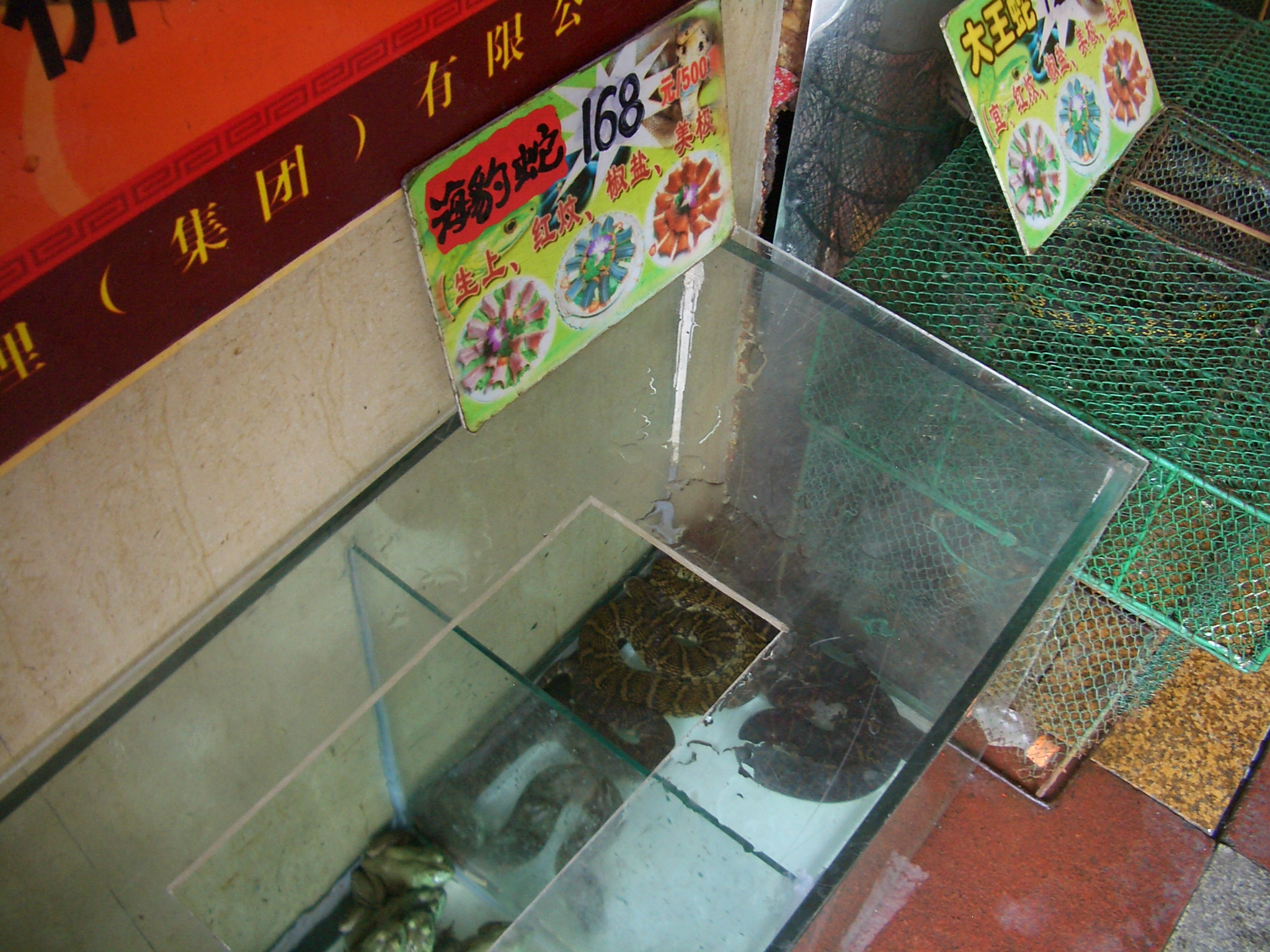
Live snakes are supplied to upscale Chinese restaurants.

- Zisiqiao (子思桥) Village, in Xinshi Town, Deqing County, Zhejiang, Zhejiang. Nicknamed "Snake Village" by the media, Zisiqiao is renowned as China's premier center of snake farming. The locals have been raising snakes since the 1980s; currently, about 800 people in Zisiqiao work in snake farming industry, raising some 3 million snakes a year. Live snakes are supplied to specialty restaurants; dried or preserved in alcohol, they are sold to manufacturers of traditional Chinese medicines; snake-infused wine is made as well.
- Deqing Snake Culture Museum has been developed as a local tourist attraction.

== See also ==
- Queen Saovabha Memorial Institute (Thailand)
- Siberian Serpentarium
