= Zhongguan, Zhejiang =

Zhongguan 钟管镇
- Town
- Location in Zhejiang
- Coordinates: 30°38′52″N 120°11′26″E
- Country: People's Republic of China
- Province: Zhejiang
- Prefecture-level city: Huzhou
- County: Deqing

Area
  - Total: 78 km^{2} (30 sq mi)
- Elevation: 8 m (26 ft)

Population (2009)
  - Total: 46,000
  - Density: 590/km^{2} (1,500/sq mi)
- Time zone: UTC+8 (China Standard)
- Postal code: 313220
- Area code: 0572
- Website: zhongguan.gov.cn

Zhongguan (simplified Chinese: 钟管; traditional Chinese: 鐘管; pinyin: Zhōngguǎn) is a town in the northeast of Deqing County in northern Zhejiang province, China. As of 2018, it has one residential community (社区) and 19 villages under its administration, and as of 2009, it had a population of 46,000 residing in an area of 78 km^{2} (30 sq mi).

== History ==
When the Republic of China ruled the mainland, Zhongguan was known as Zhongguan Township (钟管乡) until its merger in 1947 into Longxi Township (龙溪乡). In July 1950, Zhongguan Township was re-established and remained a township until October 1958, when it, along with Ganshan Township (干山乡) and Getting Township (戈亭乡), was merged into a people's commune. Township status was restored in January 1984, and Zhongguan was upgraded to a town in April 1989. Getting Township (戈亭乡) was merged into Zhongguan in July 1992, and Ganshan (干山镇) merged in April 2004.

== Tourism ==
- Mount Li Scenic Area (蠡山风景名胜区)
- Neolithic Ruins of Huishan (辉山遗址) and Shentang (审塘遗址)

== Notable people ==
- Guan Daosheng, Yuan Dynasty painter
- Fu Yunlong (傅云龙), Qing Dynasty diplomat and calligraphist

== See also ==
- List of township-level divisions of Zhejiang
