= Mark Kitto =

British businessman

Mark Kitto is a British magazine publisher, writer and actor notable for living in the People's Republic of China. During his time in China he initially lived in Shanghai before relocating to Mount Mogan where he ran a coffee shop, restaurant and three guest houses. In 2013 he announced his intention to leave, citing the welfare of his children as the deciding factor.

== Education and early life ==
After attending a prep school in Wales, Kitto attended Stowe School. Kitto's interest in language and the Far East led him to study Chinese at the School of Oriental and African Studies (SOAS). For the second year of his degree course, he went to Beijing in 1986. As a student, and in later years, he travelled to most of China’s provinces, and in 1993 he was a member of the first expedition to cross the Taklamakan Desert from west to east.

According to Kitto, he first discovered Mount Mogan during the Lunar New Year in 1999 and returned frequently thereafter.

== Professional career ==
Kitto was a Captain in the Welsh Guards.

in 1993 he was a member of an expedition to cross the Taklamakan desert on camel.

After leaving the army he became a metals trader in London and then China in 1996. By 2004, he had set up a foreign joint venture consultancy company, and invested 3m yuan ($350,000) to bring his formula north to the capital by launching the magazine titles That’s Beijing, with a circulation of 20,000, That’s Shanghai (then 45,000) and That’s Guangzhou (15,000). The business and the magazines were entirely “self-made,” stated Kitto.

In 2004, after seven years building up his magazine empire, Kitto says it was seized by the state. He stated, "I lived in the grey zone that is China’s media business and, despite my commitment to the country, paid a high price." Kitto has been a regular contributor to Prospect Magazine for the last six years. In his article "You'll never be Chinese", Kitto wrote: "my state-owned competitors (enemy is more accurate) told me in private that they studied every issue I produced so they could learn from me. They proceeded to do everything in their power to destroy me." He expressed his regrets that he could not quite thrive alongside his Communist competitors, and declared that he would not miss China once he left it for good.

He chronicles his time in China and his discovery of Moganshan in his book China Cuckoo (in the UK) ISBN 978-1-84529-940-8 or Chasing China: How I Went to China in Search of a Fortune and Found a Life (the US edition) ISBN 978-1-60239-657-9.

Kitto now works as an actor, appearing in stage and television productions. He has been lauded as one of the finest actors of his generation.

His latest performance is a two-man play entitled Chinese Boxing, which he co-wrote and appears in.

== External links and further reading ==
- "You’ll never be Chinese: Why I’m leaving the country I loved." Mark Kitto, Prospect Magazine August 8, 2012
