= Qinghe Bridge =

Qinghe Bridge 清河桥
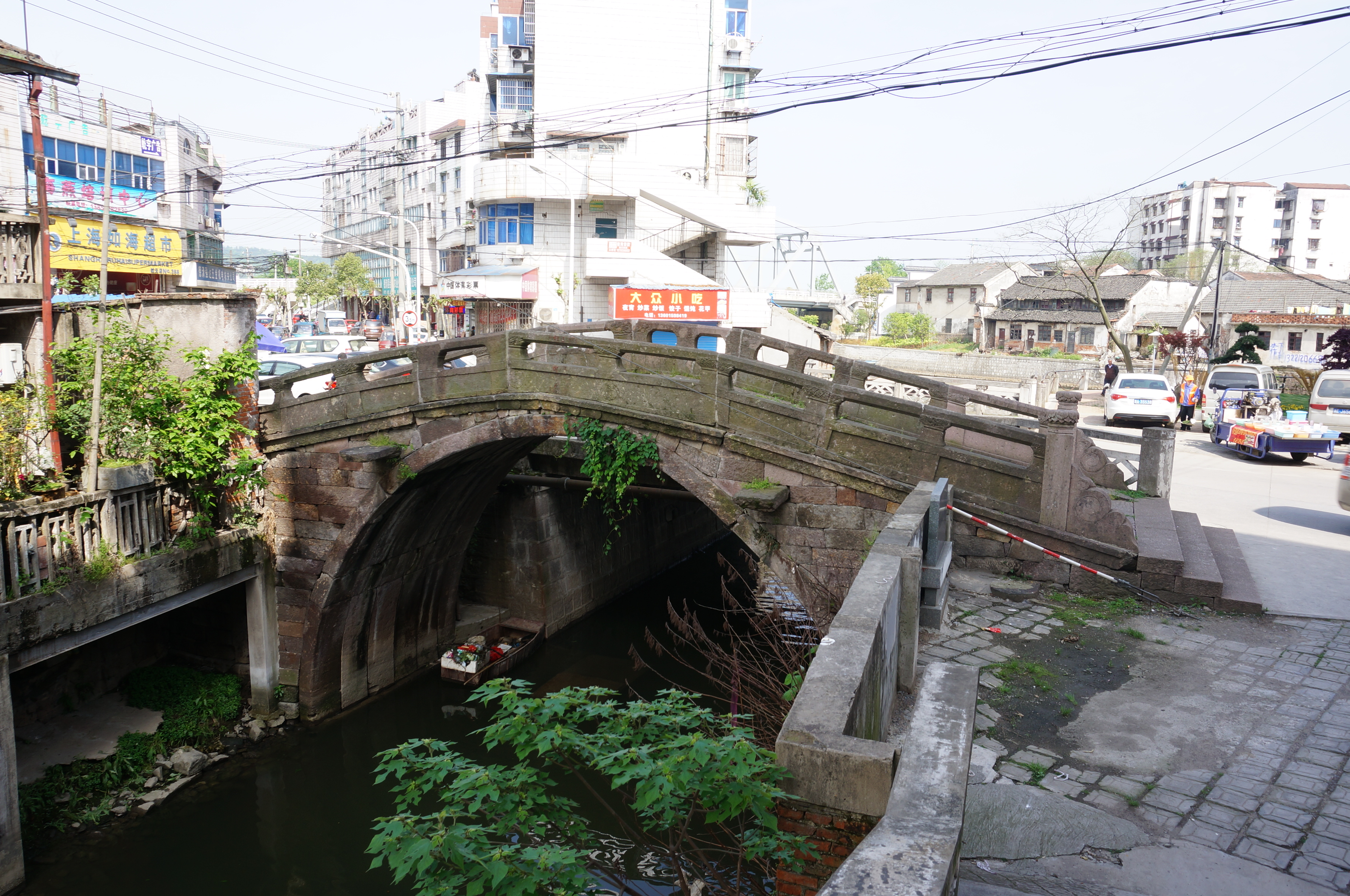
- Qinghe Bridge in April 2016
- Coordinates: 30°33′03″N 119°57′45″E
- Carries: Pedestrians
- Crosses: Xianqiao River
- Locale: Qianyuan, Deqing County, Zhejiang, China

Characteristics
- Design: Arch bridge
- Material: Stone
- Total length: 16 metres (52 ft)
- Width: 3 metres (9.8 ft)
- Longest span: 8.6 metres (28 ft)

History
- Construction start: 1064
- Construction end: 1067

The Qinghe Bridge (simplified Chinese: 清河桥; traditional Chinese: 清河橋; pinyin: Qīnghé Qiáo) is a historic stone arch bridge over the Xianqiao River (县桥河; 'County Bridge River') in the town of Qianyuan, Deqing County, Zhejiang, China.

== History ==
Qinghe Bridge was originally built by magistrate Chen Zhifang (陈之方) between 1064 and 1067 during the Northern Song dynasty (960–1279), but because of war and natural disasters has been rebuilt numerous times since then. In March 2005, it has been authorized as a provincial-level cultural heritage site by the Government of Zhejiang.

== Gallery ==
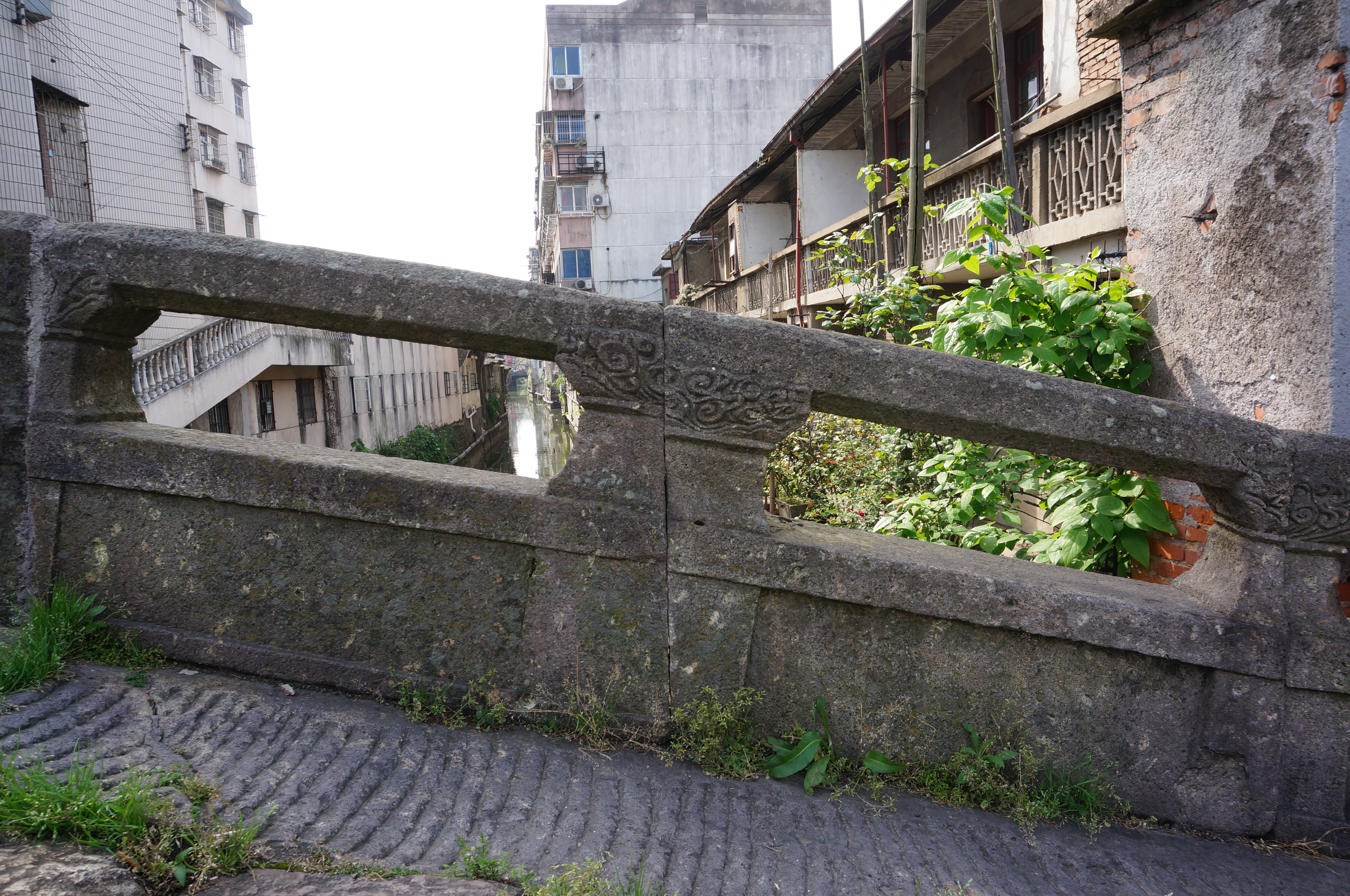
Bridge railings

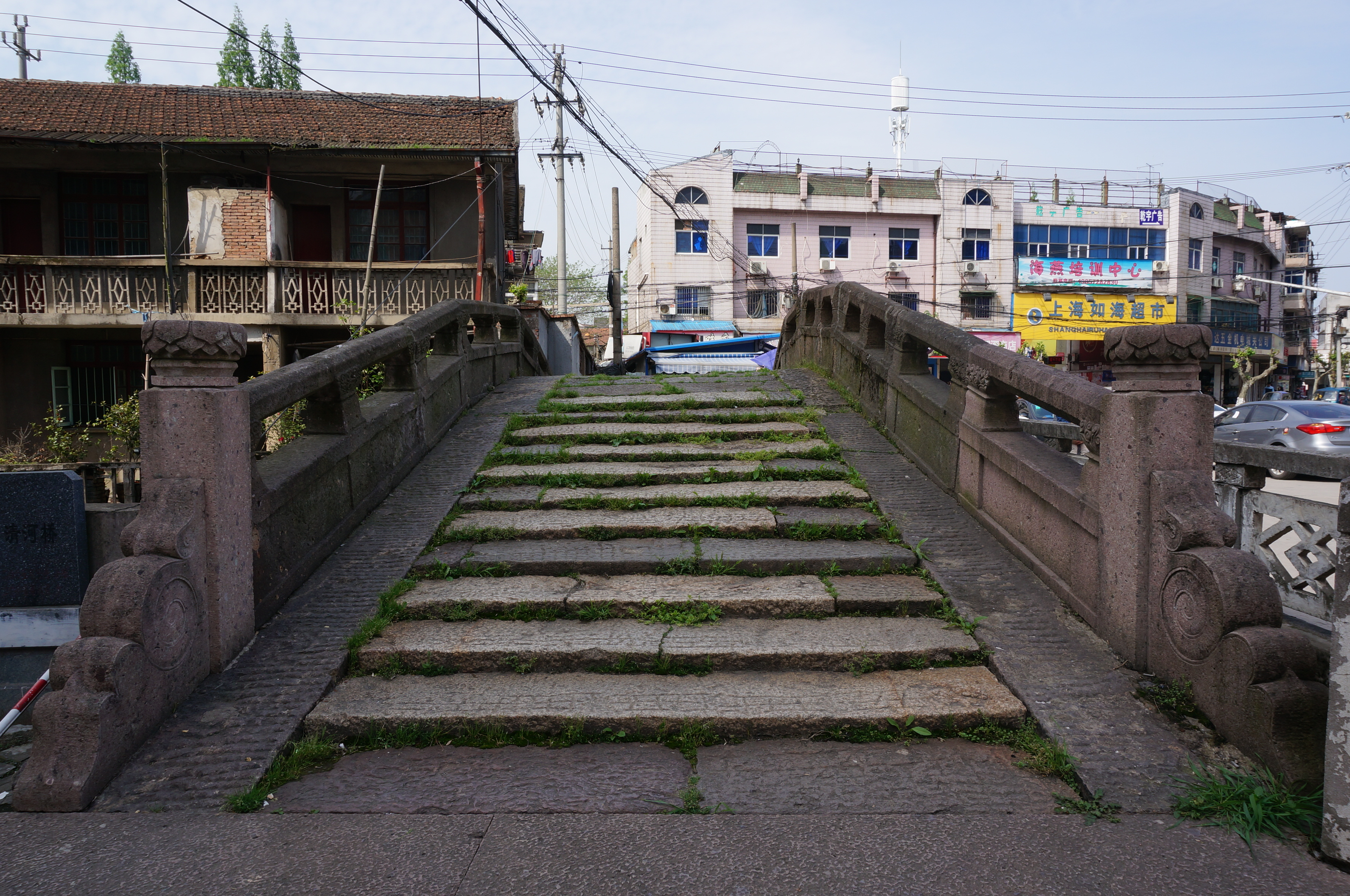
Qinghe Bridge

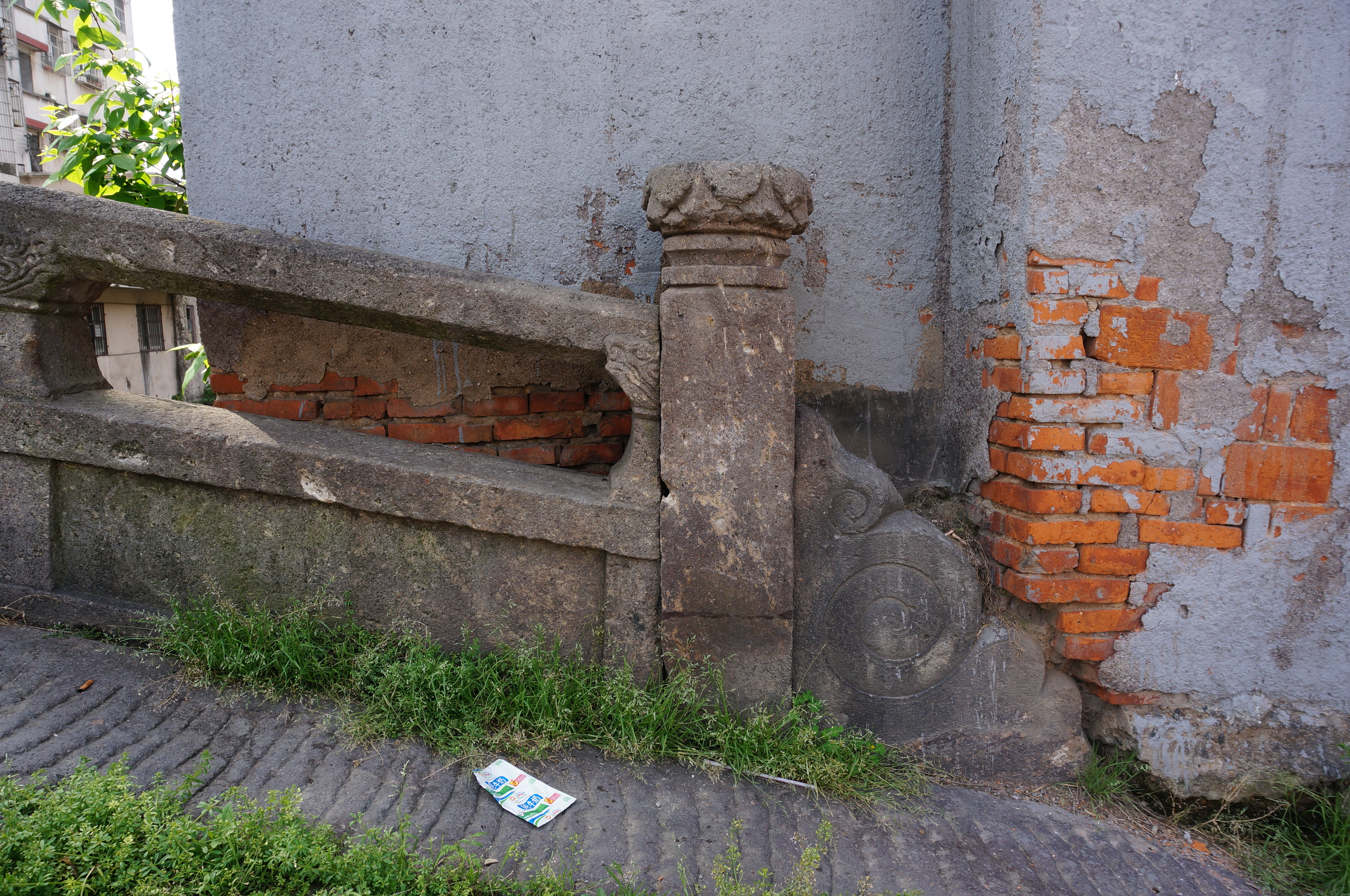
Bridge railings
