= Deqing County, Zhejiang =

Deqing 德清县 Tehtsing
- County
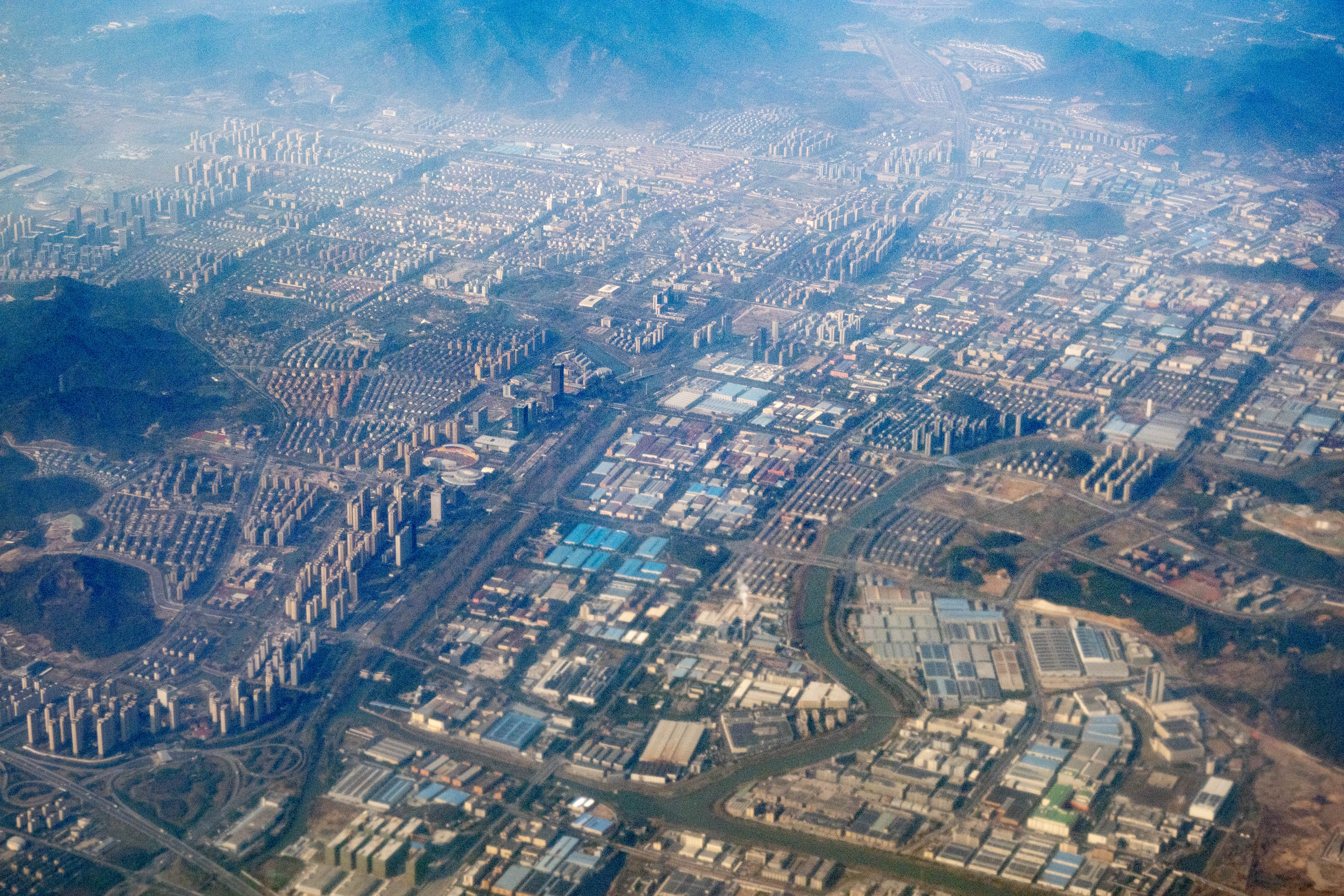
- Aerial photographs of Deqing County seat

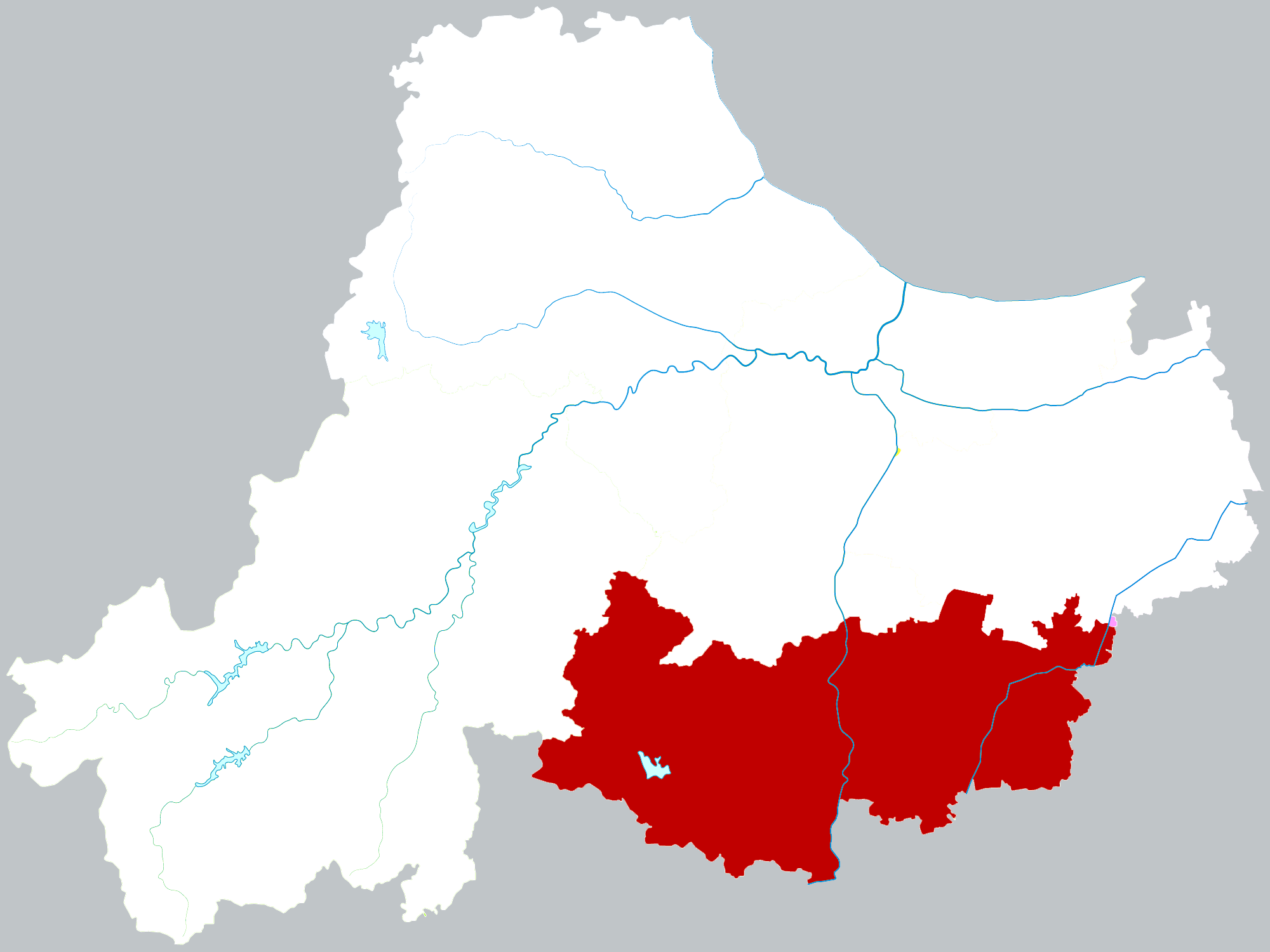
- Location of Deqing County within Huzhou

- Location of the seat in Zhejiang
- Coordinates: 30°32′33″N 119°58′39″E
- Country: People's Republic of China
- Province: Zhejiang
- Prefecture-level city: Huzhou

Area
  - County: 937.7 km^{2} (362.0 sq mi)
  - Metro: 937.7 km^{2} (362.0 sq mi)

Population (2020 census)
  - County: 548,568
  - Density: 585.0/km^{2} (1,515/sq mi)
  - Metro: 548,568
- Time zone: UTC+8 (China Standard)

Deqing (Deqing; Chinese: 德清县; pinyin: Déqīng Xiàn) is a county in the prefecture-level city of Huzhou, in the northwest of Zhejiang province. As of 2020 census, its population was 548,568 living in the built-up (or metro) area. Deqing is very close to Hangzhou and Shaoxing and has become a de facto suburb of the two large cities. It is being conurbated soon and a Metro Line is planned in the middle term to link both cities.

== Geography ==
Located in the middle of the plain between the Hangzhou Bay and the Taihu, most of Deqing County is flat, criss-crossed by numerous canals. The western end of the county is mountainous. There, the popular tourist areas of Moganshan (莫干山) is located. Moganshan is a scenic mountain, an hour from Hangzhou, with many pre-World War II villas built by foreigners, along with one of Chiang Kai-shek's Kuomintang compounds.

Zisiqiao (子思桥) Village, located within Deqing County's Xinshi Town, is renowned as a center of snake farming. The locals have been raising snakes since the 1980s; currently, about 800 people in Zisiqiao work in snake farming industry, raising some three million snakes a year. Live snakes are supplied to specialty restaurants; dried or preserved in alcohol, they are sold to manufacturers of traditional Chinese medicines; snake-infused wine is made as well. The village is nicknamed "Snake Village" by the media, and Deqing Snake Culture Museum is a local tourist attraction.

== Administrative divisions ==
Towns:

- Wukang (武康镇), Qianyuan (乾元镇), Xinshi (新市镇), Luoshe (洛舍镇), Xin'an (新安镇), Leidian (雷甸镇), Zhongguan (钟管镇), Yuyue (禹越镇), Moganshan (莫干山镇)

== Climate ==
Climate data for Deqing, elevation 102 m (335 ft), (1991–2020 normals, extremes 1981–present)
Month	Jan	Feb	Mar	Apr	May	Jun	Jul	Aug	Sep	Oct	Nov	Dec	Year
Record high °C (°F)	23.4 (74.1)	29.3 (84.7)	33.9 (93.0)	34.3 (93.7)	36.5 (97.7)	37.8 (100.0)	40.2 (104.4)	41.6 (106.9)	39.8 (103.6)	34.6 (94.3)	29.8 (85.6)	24.4 (75.9)	41.6 (106.9)
Mean daily maximum °C (°F)	8.2 (46.8)	10.8 (51.4)	15.5 (59.9)	21.7 (71.1)	26.5 (79.7)	28.9 (84.0)	33.3 (91.9)	32.7 (90.9)	28.2 (82.8)	23.2 (73.8)	17.3 (63.1)	11.0 (51.8)	21.4 (70.6)
Daily mean °C (°F)	4.1 (39.4)	6.3 (43.3)	10.5 (50.9)	16.3 (61.3)	21.4 (70.5)	24.5 (76.1)	28.6 (83.5)	28.1 (82.6)	23.8 (74.8)	18.3 (64.9)	12.3 (54.1)	6.4 (43.5)	16.7 (62.1)
Mean daily minimum °C (°F)	1.1 (34.0)	2.9 (37.2)	6.6 (43.9)	11.9 (53.4)	17.2 (63.0)	21.2 (70.2)	25.0 (77.0)	24.7 (76.5)	20.6 (69.1)	14.7 (58.5)	8.7 (47.7)	3.0 (37.4)	13.1 (55.7)
Record low °C (°F)	−7.8 (18.0)	−6.9 (19.6)	−3.7 (25.3)	1.1 (34.0)	8.2 (46.8)	12.9 (55.2)	18.4 (65.1)	18.1 (64.6)	11.0 (51.8)	3.3 (37.9)	−3.5 (25.7)	−7.9 (17.8)	−7.9 (17.8)
Average precipitation mm (inches)	89.8 (3.54)	84.6 (3.33)	125.9 (4.96)	102.0 (4.02)	125.3 (4.93)	249.2 (9.81)	194.0 (7.64)	181.8 (7.16)	122.7 (4.83)	75.2 (2.96)	70.8 (2.79)	59.1 (2.33)	1,480.4 (58.3)
Average precipitation days (≥ 0.1 mm)	12.2	11.4	14.1	13.3	12.8	15.8	13.9	15.0	11.2	8.3	10.3	9.3	147.6
Average snowy days	3.9	2.7	1.0	0	0	0	0	0	0	0	0.3	1.3	9.2
Average relative humidity (%)	76	75	74	72	73	80	77	78	79	76	77	74	76
Mean monthly sunshine hours	105.7	104.6	126.7	147.3	158.8	119.3	190.4	179.0	140.4	149.1	124.8	122.0	1,668.1
Percentage possible sunshine	33	33	34	38	37	28	44	44	38	43	40	39	38
Source: China Meteorological Administration all-time extreme temperature

== Religion ==
Yunxiu Temple is a Buddhist temple in Xiazhuhu Subdistrict.

== Transportation ==
Deqing has two railway stations, normal trains serve through Deqing West railway station, which located on the Xuancheng–Hangzhou railway, with fairly frequent, although not particularly fast, passenger service to Hangzhou and Hefei. High speed trains serve Deqing railway station, on the Nanjing-Hangzhou high-speed railway.

== Tourist attractions ==
The county houses many ancient bridges, such as Sengjia Bridge and Qinghe Bridge.
