= Xinshi, Huzhou =

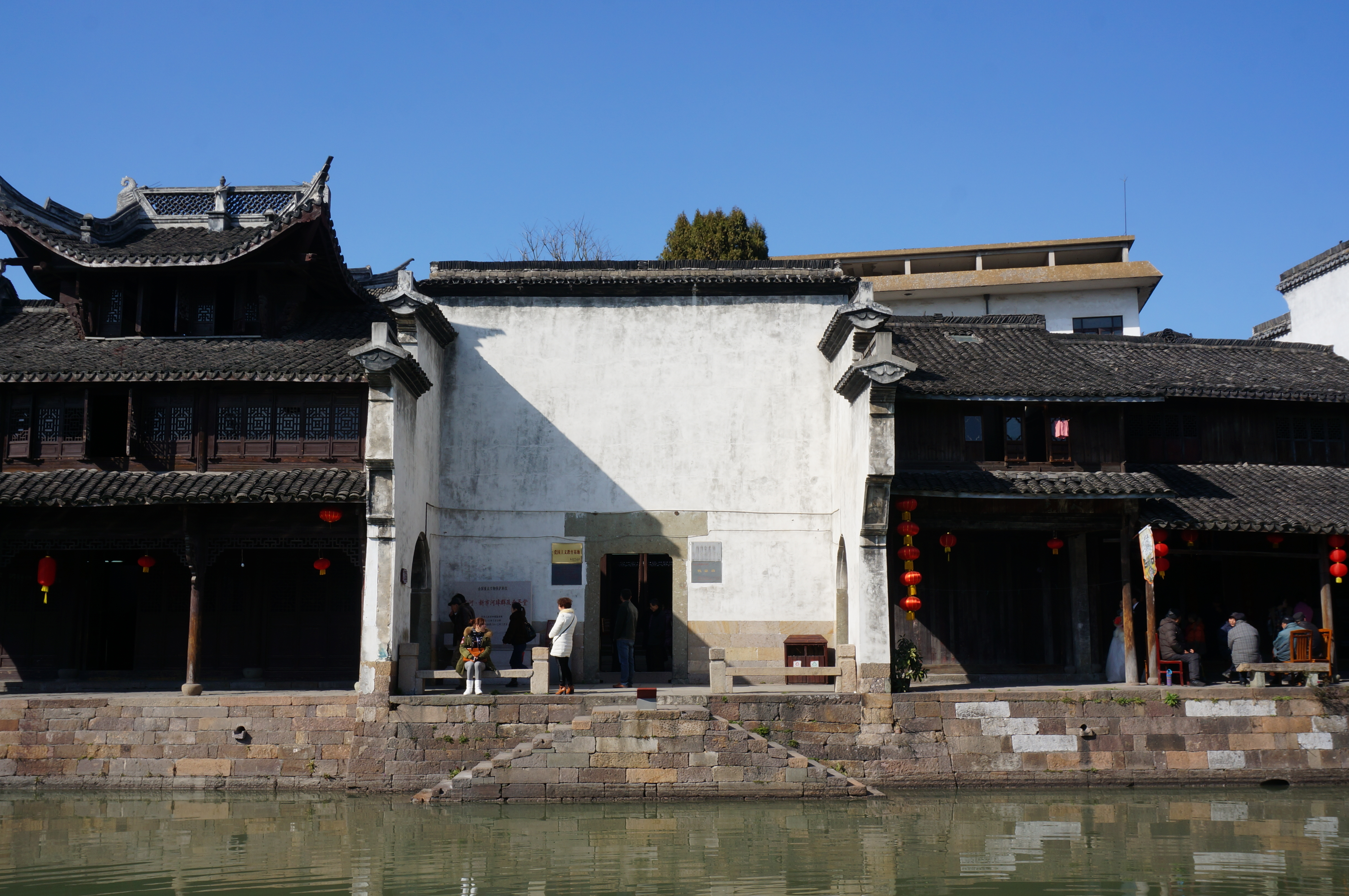

Xinshi Town (Chinese: 新市镇; pinyin: Xīnshì zhèn) is a town in Deqing County of Huzhou prefecture-level city, in China's Zhejiang Province. Xinshi is located about 30 km north-east of the provincial capital, Hangzhou.

Xinshi Town's Zisiqiao Village (子思桥; 30°36′00″N 120°13′00″E), nicknamed the "Snake Village" by the media, is renowned as a center of snake farming. The locals have been raising snakes since ca. 1985; currently, about 800 people in Zisiqiao work in snake farming industry, raising some 3 million snakes a year. Live snakes are supplied to specialty restaurants; dried or preserved in alcohol, they are sold to manufacturers of traditional Chinese medicines; snake-infused wine is made as well. Deqing Snake Culture Museum is a local tourist attraction.
