= Japanese independent churches =

The first Japanese independent church movement began in 1901, when Uchimura Kanzo formed the Mukyokai. His main message was the need for complete and ultimate independence from all human forces and entire reliance on God.

== State-enforced independence ==
=== United Church of Christ in Japan ===
As the outbreak of the Pacific War was imminent, the Japanese wartime regime planned to sever the Japanese church from its Western connections.

The United Church of Christ in Japan (Kyōdan) is a collection of diverse Protestant religious bodies forcibly united by the Japanese wartime government in 1941. In accordance with the 1939 Religious Organizations Law, Christian churches were required to comply with conditions set by the Ministry of Education in order to receive official recognition or legal status. Indicating that it would only recognize one Protestant denomination, the Ministry directed the various churches to form one organization.

In 1941, as a government-directed union of thirty four denominations, the UCCJ absorbed all transplanted Protestant mission church (with the exception of a section of the Anglican Church, the Seventh-day Adventists, and few small evangelical churches who refused to cooperate).

With the establishment of religious freedom by the Allied occupation forces in 1946, many groups left the Kyōdan to reestablish their prewar denominational identities. The most significant departures were the Anglican Church in Japan, the Japan Lutheran Church, Japan Baptist Convention, Japan Holiness Church, and Japan Assemblies of God.

== The extra-mission indigenous sector ==
=== Nonchurch movement ===
The Nonchurch movement is the most widely known and respected expression of independent Japanese Christianity, due largely to the fact that Uchimura Kanzo was a prolific writer respected by many individuals both within and outside Christian circles. The complete works of Uchimura consists of some fifty volumes. The Nonchurch movement was a lay reform movement and described by writers as an indigenous form of Japanese Christianity totally independent of Western influence.

=== Living Christ One Ear of Wheat Church ===
The Living Christ One Ear of Wheat Church was founded by Matsubara Kazuhito in 1939. This is an independent and indigenous church, but the evangelical and holiness mission traditions provide the primary theological foundations for the church. Like the holiness traditions, the church emphasized baptism of the Holy Spirit and healing; speaking in tongues, however, is not recognized as a legitimate practice for public worship, although some members exercise the gift in private. The founder emphasized divine healing and often anointed individuals with oil and held special healing services. This is much less common today, but occasionally a healing service is held. The church observes both baptism and the Lord's Supper.

=== Japan Eccelsia of Christ ===
The founder of the Japan Ecclesia of Christ, Koike Tasuo, was born in 1904 and educated in Tokyo Imperial University. He became attracted to Christianity as a young man as a result of attending the Bible lectures of Uchimura Kanzō, the well-known founder of the Nonchurch movement. After his conversion, he attended a Nonchurch Bible study group led by Takeshi Fujii, one of Uchimura's disciples, for a period of five years (1925–1930).

=== Holy Ecclesia of Jesus ===
Founded in 1946 by Ōtsuki Takeji, The Holy Ecclesia of Jesus is a movement aimed at recovering apostolic Christianity and entrusted with a special mission regarding the nation of Israel in these "last days." Ōtsuki was attracted to the faith through the evangelistic preaching of Kanamori Michinori during the daily chapel program and went on to receive baptism. Ōtsuki found his way into the Japan Holiness Church in 1930. The leader of the Holiness Church, Nakada Jūji, was a charismatic individual whose impact on Ōtsuki was enormous. Indeed, to this day Ōtsuki refers to Nakada as his teacher and great prophet, adding that before meeting him he had understood nothing of the Bible's teaching's regarding personal sanctification, the restoration of Israel, and the Second Coming of Christ.

=== Okinawa Christian Gospel ===
The founder of the Okinawa Christian Gospel, Nakahara Masao, had moved to Kyoto and enrolled in a professional school in order to obtain credentials as a radiologist. It was while he was in Kyoto that he began to attend services at a Plymouth Brethren Church. Within three months he converted to the Christian faith and received baptism. Nakahara returned to Okinawa to work as a radiologist in a local hospital. In 1977 an experience of divine healing and revelation from God led him to resign from his position as an X-ray technician to devote the remainder of his life to evangelistic work. His independent Christian fellowship grew rapidly and in less than twenty years had six branch churches, two mission outreach centers, and a membership of approximately 1,500.

== Quasi-Christian sector ==
As noted earlier, Japan is known as a fertile ground for new forms of religion. The Christian tradition is no exception, and there exist in fact many independent groups that claim a Christian label.

=== The Way ===
The Way was founded by Matsumura Kaiseki. Matsumura initially called his movement the One Heart Association but in 1907 renamed it to the "Church of Japan", to create a new Japanese Christianity independent of Western control. As his religious beliefs and convictions gradually came to be systematized, it became increasingly apparent that it was misleading to refer to his movement as a "Church". Ironically, it was his most sympathetic Japanese colleague who forced him to recognize that he had clearly departed from the Christian faith.

=== Christ Heart Church ===
The Christ Heart Church was formed in 1927. Its founder, Kawai Shinsui (川合信水, 1867–1962), reinterpreted the faith through the lenses of Confucian and Buddhist traditions by claiming that Christianity offers a more complete path of self-cultivation and advocates traditional Buddhist disciplines of meditation to achieve a Christian satori (enlightenment). Zen meditation and kyokenjutsu (強健術) became important means of development in the Christ Heart Church. In sharp contrast to Protestant missionary policy, the Christ Heart Church allow its members to maintain the traditional Buddhist altar in the home. They also see no conflict between Christian faith and ancestor veneration. In fact, their members are encouraged to show proper respect toward traditional customs, and their participation in Buddhist ancestral rites with non-Christian family members is not regarded as problematic.

=== Spirit of Jesus Church ===
The Spirit of Jesus Church was organized before the Pacific War by Murai Jun, and named in accordance with a 'heavenly vision' he reportedly received in 1941. This church became an incorporated religious organization in 1953. It is one of the fastest growing Christian bodies in Japan, having increased its membership from 34,477 in 1970 to 433,108 at the end of the 1980s. At the outset of the 1980s, the vernacular “Christian yearbook” ceased adding its membership figures to the total Christian population.

The Spirit of Jesus Church links salvific work in the spirit world and the notion of "household" salvation to the supposed ritual of vicarious baptism referred to in 1 Cor. 15:29. This church claims that through the ritual of vicarious baptism (先祖の身代わり洗礼) that the blessings of individual salvation can be extended to past generations as well. Members of this church can request that ancestors be baptized at the same time they are, or whenever they become concerned about the salvation of those who have gone before. A member simply states the ancestor's name, announces his or her relationship to the deceased, and then undergoes baptism by immersion on their behalf. It is significant to note here that this church also performs baptism for mizuko (水子, aborted and stillborn children). They claim that "through this ritual the good news of the forgiveness of sins is communicated to the dead, and their spirits are transported from hades to heaven."

=== Original Gospel Tabernacle ===
The Original Gospel Tabernacle, also known as Makuya (幕屋), was founded by Ikurō Teshima. It represents another Japanese effort to recover Apostolic Christianity. In 1948 Teshima began publishing his own magazine.

Teshima's "Christianization of the pre-Christian past" included his interpretation that the ancient Japanese fellowship with the gods referred to in Kojiki and Nihon Shoki was in fact communication with the heavenly spirits referred to as angels in the Bible. These Japanese forebears not only provided exemplary models of spirituality and dependence on God, but also revealed what true humanity was intended to be. This is also what the life of Jesus in the gospel reveals to us. It is the aim of the Original Gospel movement, Teshima explains, to join in Jesus' mission to restore this true humanity to all people. Teshima also recognized the valuable contributions of Japanese Buddhists, such as Kōbo Daishi, Hōnen, Nichiren, and Hakuin and refers to this heritage as the Old Testament for Japanese.

=== Life-Giving Christ ===
Founded by Imahashi Atsushi in 1966, this movement is essentially an independent version of the Makuya movement. Following a one-year period of study in Israel as a Makuya member, Imahashi returned to Japan in 1964 and began his ministry as an evangelist under the direction of Teshima Ikuro. A serious disagreement with Teshima forced him out of Makuya and he began his own independent ministry in 1966. The Life-Giving Christ movement today consists of seven small ecclesia under the direction of Imahashi. Like Makuya, they also taught that the spirits of the deceased could be 'saved' by Christ in the spirit world if members prayed for them.

== See also ==
- Chinese Independent Churches
