= True Jesus Church (Caidu) =

Church in Shangcai County, China

True Jesus Church was a church building which was located in the town of Caidu in Shangcai County which is under the jurisdiction of the city of Zhumadian and located in Henan province in the People's Republic of China. The large church building was destroyed by Communist Party officials in 2019. Of China's 23 provinces, Henan province has had the highest percentage of Christians since 1999.

Communist officials stated that the church had engaged in illegal fundraising. On June 22, 2019, the process of removing the church building began with the arrival of about 60 officials from the Religious Affairs Bureau. The director of the Religious Affairs Bureau told the congregation that the church was to be converted into a nursing home. The electrical supply of the church was cut, and the gate lock was broken. On July 26, 2019, at around three o'clock in the morning, about 1,000 government officials and personnel from several county departments arrived to demolish the church. Two elderly people were injured while the church was being razed. The church had been estimated to be worth $1.4 million US dollars. In August 2019, after the church had been destroyed, persecution of citizens continued with eight people in charge of the church and 13 churchgoers arrested. A new lawn with small trees was planted in the place where the church had stood.

The True Jesus Church in Caidu was part of a network of churches by the same name. The original True Jesus Church was started in Beijing in 1917 by Paul Wei, a cloth merchant who converted to Christianity. The True Jesus Church does not belong to the state-approved Three-Self Patriotic Movement.
