= Chinese Independent Churches =

The Chinese Independent Churches are a category of churches of Chinese people.

== Imperial China ==
=== Gospel of Grace Church (福音堂) ===
The Gospel of Grace Church or Grace Evangelical church was founded at Shandong by Xi Sheng-Mo (席胜魔) in 1881. In 1906, Yu Zong-Zhou (俞宗周) established this church in Shanghai. These were some of the early indigenous churches established by local Chinese Christians.

== Republican China ==
=== True Jesus Church (真耶穌教會) ===
The True Jesus Church was registered in Beijing in 1917. Early workers include Paul Wei, Zhang Lingsheng, and Barnabas Zhang. The General Coordination Board was established in Nanjing which was later moved to Shanghai. The English version of the church name was once the "True Jesus Mission".

This independent church is an offshoot or breakaway from the first wave of the Pentecostal movement in the United States during the early 1900s. Pentecostal missionaries from the Azusa Street Revival were the first to arrive in Hong Kong as early as October 1907. The Pentecostal movement in China spread through Protestant organizations that were already established, leading to the creation of the True Jesus Church and many others.

The True Jesus Church was also later established in Taiwan in 1926. Presently there are more than three hundred churches and prayer houses in Taiwan.

=== Church Assembly Hall (聚會所) ===
Also known as the local churches, the Church Assembly Hall is a church founded by Watchman Nee, Zhou-An Lee, Shang-Jie Song and others when they started holding family services in 1922.

They began arranging small group hymn singing sessions in Shanghai so many Chinese refer to them as the small group and they were known (or the nickname) as the Little Flock, and because at that time, they were still using the Plymouth Brethren's Hymn Book called Little Flock Hymn Book.

=== Jesus Family (耶穌家庭) ===
The Jesus Family is a unique Pentecostal communitarian church first established in Shandong province in the late 1920s. It is a more distinctive type of independent churches in China. Founded and established by Jing Dianying (敬奠瀛).

=== Christian Tabernacle (基督徒會堂) ===
It originally was just a family service but was later established as a new church by Wang Mingdao (王明道) at Beijing in 1937. The Christian Tabernacle was founded without the help of any foreign missionary so it was essentially Chinese Christians preaching to Chinese people. They also self-administer and are self-sufficient economically.

== People's Republic of China ==
The independent churches established during the republican era are the most well known and representative of the many independent churches in China. Today, many of them constitute a significant portion of what is generally termed the house church movement in China, because after 1949, with the arrival of Communist control and departure of all foreign missionaries, all Chinese Christian denominations had become independent.

== See also ==
- Japanese Independent Churches
