= China Christian Independent Church =

The China Christian Independent Church or the CCIC (Chinese: 中國耶穌教自立會; pinyin: Zhongguo Yesujiao Zilihui) was an independent Chinese Christian organization established by Yu Guozhen in Shanghai in the early-20th century.

== History ==
The CCIC was established in 1906 as a Chinese organization upholding the three-self principles of self-governance, self-support, and self-propagation. In 1910, it established its own periodical The Chinese Christian (Chinese: 中國基督徒報; pinyin: Zhongguo Jidutubao), which was later renamed The Sacred News (Chinese: 聖報; pinyin: Shengbao).

By 1924, it had 330 branch churches and over 20,000 Chinese Christian members. Many of its branches were former churches established by Presbyterian or Congregationalist missionaries, but wanting to be independent from foreign control.
