= Barnabas Zhang =

Chinese evangelist

Barnabas Zhang (Chinese: 張巴拿巴; pinyin: Zhāng Bānábā; 11 February 1882 – 25 January 1961), was an early pioneer of the Chinese indigenous True Jesus Church (Chinese: 真耶穌教會; pinyin: Zhēn Yēsū Jiàohuì).

== Biography ==
Originally known as Zhang Dianju (Chinese: 張殿舉; pinyin: Zhāng Diànjǔ), he was born in Weixian, Shandong Province, and worked as a collector of antiques. He was first introduced to the True Jesus Church through his relative Zhang Lingsheng, who came and proselytized in his hometown of Weixian. After hearing Zhang Lingsheng's preaching, Zhang Dianju, a Presbyterian, received the baptism of the Holy Spirit and began to speak in tongues on 16 March 1912.

Paul Wei, often considered the founder of the True Jesus Church, (Note: Later, Barnabas Zhang would claim that he founded the True Jesus Church five years before Paul Wei in 1912.) would likewise travel to Weixian in spring 1919. He actively proselytized to members of local Presbyterian churches, establishing local branches of the True Jesus Church. Wei ordained Zhang Lingsheng as bishop of Shandong and Zhang Dianju as elder, and all three would travel throughout many provinces of China and draw in over a thousand members, most of whom came from existing independent, Pentecostal, Seventh Day Adventist, or mainline churches. Many of these new converts would take on new names, including Zhang Dianju who would now be known as Barnabas Zhang.

Despite Paul Wei's death in October 1919, the church continued to thrive and grow in the 1920s under two headquarters, one led by Isaac Wei, the son of Paul Wei, and the other led by Barnabas Zhang. However, a growing north–south schism developed between the two leaders with Isaac Wei being influential in northern China and Barnabas Zhang becoming increasingly influential in the southern provinces of Fujian and Guangdong, as well as in Taiwan and Chinese communities in Malaya. In a general assembly in 1930, Barnabas Zhang was excommunicated, placing the church under the leadership of Isaac Wei. However, Barnabas Zhang would still lead a number of followers in southern China and southeast Asia under the name the China True Jesus Church (Chinese: 中華真耶穌教會; pinyin: Zhōnghuá) until his death.

Barnabas died in Singapore on 25 January 1961.
