= United Church of Christ in Japan =

Protestant denomination in Japan

The United Church of Christ in Japan 日本基督教団 Nihon Kirisuto Kyōdan
- Abbreviation: UCCJ
- Classification: Japanese Independent Church
- Associations: World Council of Churches; Christian Conference of Asia; National Council of Churches in Japan
- Region: Japan; Eleven other countries
- Origin: 24 June 1941; Fujimicho Church
- Merger of: Thirty-three denominations
- Separations: Anglican Church in Japan; Japan Assemblies of God; Japan Baptist Convention; Japan Holiness Church; Japan Evangelical Lutheran Church; Reformed Church in Japan; The Salvation Army; Nihon Kirisuto Kyokai (Church of Christ in Japan); Numerous evangelical churches
- Congregations: 1,725
- Members: 195,851
- Ministers: 2,189
- Official website: http://uccj.org

The United Church of Christ in Japan (UCCJ; Japanese: 日本基督教団 Nihon Kirisuto Kyōdan, or Kyōdan for short) is the largest Protestant denomination in Japan. It is a union of thirty-three diverse Protestant denominations forcibly merged by the Japanese wartime government on 24 June 1941. The UCCJ, which is a Japanese Independent Church, is a member of the World Council of Churches (WCC).

Currently, as of 2024, the church has around 152,074 members in 1626 active congregations and preaching stations, served by, as of 31 March 2025, 1,796 active ministers and evangelists.

== History ==
=== Second World War ===
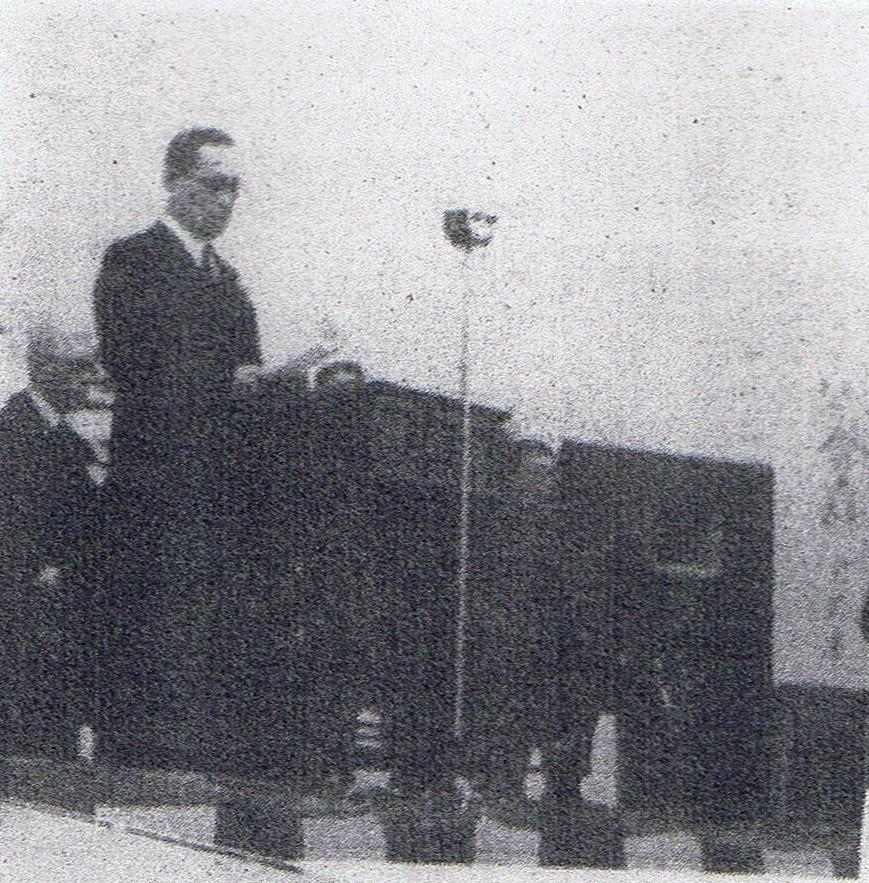
Tomita Mitsuru, the first President of the UCCJ

Upon promulgation of the Religious Organizations Law that attempted to force the merger of all of the Protestant churches in Japan, a declaration of church unity was made at a mass meeting of Christians from all parts of Japan on 17 October 1940. The Kyōdan was established at a Founding General Assembly held at the Fujimicho Church (founded by Uemura Masahisa) on 24–25 June 1941.

=== After 1945 ===
With the establishment of religious freedom by the Allied Occupation Forces in 1946, many groups left the Kyōdan to reestablish their prewar denominational identities. The most significant departures were the Anglican Church in Japan, the Japan Lutheran Church, Japan Baptist Convention, Japan Holiness Church, Japan Assemblies of God, Reformed Church in Japan (the Reformed Church in Japan did not exist as a denomination in the prewar era) plus numerous smaller evangelical churches.

=== After the 1970s ===
The controversy had both theological and non-theological roots, some tending back into an earlier period. The union's wartime origin and the church's self-acknowledged complicity in the war were called into question. While the 1954 Confession of Faith, a doctrinal statement, clarified the postwar church's identity (there are debates and disputes about this), many cite the 1967 Confession of Responsibility During World War II as recovering the church's integrity, by openly dealing with the church's wartime role.

As of 31 March 2025, seven ordained UCCJ missionaries serve in six overseas lands in a variety of ministries, a heritage begun when the first postwar missionary was sent to Brazil in 1957.

United Church of Christ in Japan permits openly gay and lesbian pastors to act as ministers.

== Seminaries and theological colleges ==
- Tokyo Union Theological Seminary 東京神学大学
- Doshisha University School of Theology 同志社大学神学部
- Kwansei Gakuin University School of Theology 関西学院大学神学部
- Tokyo Bible Seminary 東京聖書学校
- Japan Biblical Theological Seminary 日本聖書神学校
- Rural Mission Human Right Seminary 農村伝道神学校

== Notable members ==
- Ryuichi Doi – politician, pastor
- Kenji Goto – journalist beheaded by the Islamic State of Iraq and the Levant, 31 January 2015
- Shigeru Ishiba – 65th Prime Minister of Japan
- Kazoh Kitamori – theologian, pastor, author, professor
- Hideyo Noguchi – prominent bacteriologist
- Masao Takenaka – theologian, professor, author
- Manabu Waida – historian, theologian, professor, pastor, author
