= Bernt Berntsen =

Norwegian-American missionary

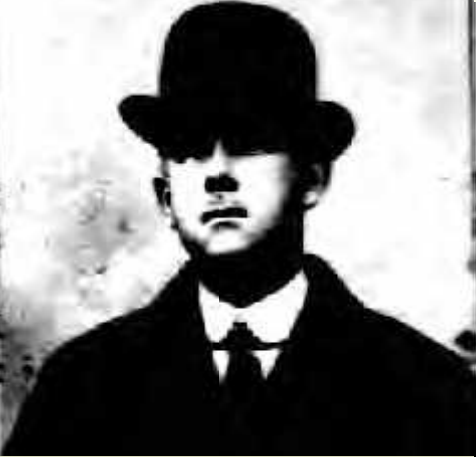
- Missionary to China
- Born: 1 January 1863; Larvik, Norway
- Died: 16 October 1933 (aged 70); Beiping, China
- Spouse: Magna Berntsen
- Parent: Ole Berntsen

Bernt Berntsen (Chinese: 賁德新, January 1, 1863 – October 16, 1933), also known as Brother B. Berntsen, was a Norwegian-American Protestant Christian missionary to China. In 1904, Berntsen and his wife Magna were able to preach along with several other independent Norwegian missionaries in a mission station in Damingfu of Zhili Province. Influenced by the 1906 Azusa Street Revival, he later founded the Apostolic Faith Mission in China (later amalgamated with the Assemblies of God) with a group of American missionaries associated with the Pentecostal movement. His evangelism had a profound influence on the early co-workers of the True Jesus Church, namely Zhang Lingsheng and Paul Wei, and he is regarded as one of the early missionary progenitors of Pentecostalism in China.

== Early life ==
Bernt Berntsen was born in Larvik, in Vestfold county, Norway. Married to Magna Berg (1867–1935), he emigrated to the United States in 1893 and was employed as a storekeeper in a local grocery store. He resided in Chicago, Illinois, for seven years and was naturalized as a United States citizen at the Circuit Court of Cook County, Illinois, on September 6, 1904. His son, Henry Berntsen, was born at Chicago in August 1900.

== Commitment to service ==
In 1904, along with his wife and two young boys, Berntsen sailed for China and joined the non-denominational South Zhili Mission which had been founded by Horace William Houlding in Damingfu of Zhili Province since 1901.

== Pentecostal encounter in America ==
In December 1906, Berntsen came across an early publication of The Apostolic Faith from Los Angeles which detailed the events of the Azusa Street Revival. In 1907, he journeyed to the Centennial Missionary Conference in Shanghai with the hope of finding someone who had experienced the Baptism of the Holy Spirit, the people there told him it was the 'work of the devil'. Although he was convinced that there was more to it than what the critics were saying, he nevertheless returned to the place of his ministry. After receiving a letter from a friend in Chicago who wrote that she had received the Baptism of the Holy Spirit, Berntsen sailed back to America to see this revival firsthand.

In August 1907, he made a trip to Seattle where he encountered Martin L. Ryan holding group prayer meetings there. Although Berntsen sought for the baptism of the Holy Spirit but did not receive it. He then journeyed to Oakland, California, and attended prayer meetings held by William F. Manley, but again he did not receive it. Berntsen ultimately travelled to Azusa Street Mission in Los Angeles where he received the Baptism of the Holy Spirit through speaking in tongues on September 15, 1907. After the Mission leaders heard his testimony, they agreed to give some financial support to his missionary work in China.

Upon his trip back to Seattle, Berntsen and a group of eleven adult Pentecostal missionaries gathered together to form a non-denominational Apostolic Faith Mission.

== Return to China ==
They sailed to China in 1908 to form the Zhengding Mission in Hebei Province. Due to the lack of fluency in the language, four of the missionaries later left for Shanghai to learn the Chinese language whilst Berntsen and his wife along with several others began spreading the Pentecostal message to the local populace. Berntsen encountered considerable resistance from some established missionary groups, nevertheless he always hoped to convince other Western missionaries. He wrote:

The missionaries here are not in favour of us, so many bad reports are circulated all over this country, so the poor people do not know what to believe of us.

He rented a store building where he held meetings during the morning and evening, drawing good-sized crowds especially from among the poor. In January 1910, Berntsen had led a number of the poorest people in the region to the Lord and described his work as a "rescue mission". By March that same year, he was caring for thirty orphaned children and a number of people who were disabled, blind, mute, and other outcasts.

Between April and November 1910, Berntsen visited Norway, Sweden and Denmark before returning to China directly from Northern Europe. Berntsen also maintained contacts with the emerging Pentecostal movement in Norway, led by Thomas Ball Barratt and Erik Andersen Nordquelle. His daughter Ruth (1910–1947) was born in Zhengding or Guangxi in August 1910.

In 1912, they printed a Chinese-language publication named Popular Gospel Truths which emphasized on the importance of receiving the baptism of the Holy Spirit. They remained at the Zhengding Mission until 1916. Among those baptised were Zhang Lingsheng (in 1910) and Paul Wei (in 1916).

== Later life ==
Starting from 1914 onwards, Berntsen and many of the Apostolic Faith Mission missionaries in China became affiliated with the Assemblies of God.

During 1916, Berntsen was approached by Zhang Lingsheng, who after having read tracts published by the Seventh-day Adventists, advised Berntsen that he also keep the Seventh-day worship. He agreed to do so and on September 1, 1916, Berntsen announced on the thirteenth edition of the Popular Gospel Truth publication that they would be holding Seventh-day worship from now on.

In 1917, Berntsen published a tract titled "The Viewpoint on Seventh-day Sabbath worship in China", which mentioned that worshipping on the Western Sabbath day is equivalent to worshipping on Sunday in China. He reasons:

...because Sunday in China is the Sabbath day, and this is due to the fact that when people in the Western Hemisphere are sailing towards China by ship, they need to lose one day [ie. put the time forward by one day] when they are still halfway at sea. In this way, Sunday in China is the same as Saturday in the Western Hemisphere. Currently, in regions such as the United States and Britain, Saturday is the Seventh-day Sabbath, hence according to such projections, in order to keep the Holy Sabbath in the region of China [at the same time as in the West], it ought to be kept on a Sunday.

.

However Paul Wei was opposed to keeping the Sabbath on a Sunday and dismissed the tract's viewpoints of the Sabbath as "erroneous". Zhang Lingsheng travelled to Beijing to peacefully persuade Paul to change his stance, but after several discussions together, Zhang himself understood and gradually accepted Paul's viewpoint. Hence in the spring of 1918, Zhang and Paul cooperated as co-workers, announced at the Tianjin chapel that they were to be keeping the Sabbath worship on a Saturday and thus formed their independent Pentecostal-Sabbatarian True Jesus Church.

During the middle of 1919, Berntsen clarified his viewpoint regarding the Sabbath on the Popular Gospel Truth publication,

...Recently some of our brethren have argued that China and the land of the Judea belong to the same continent of Asia; however if there are any Jews who travel by land to China, then they would not need to deduct one day whilst they are travelling halfway through their journey. Hence if our brethren in China can keep the Sabbath worship on Sundays, then we and our Christian brothers living everywhere in the world can keep the seventh-day Sabbath at the same time period. Therefore the Western Sabbath is approximately the same as worshipping on a Sunday in China.

.

By 1919, Berntsen had become affiliated with the Pentecostal Assemblies of the World, Church of God.

== Death ==
Berntsen died at the German Hospital at Beiping, China, on October 16, 1933, due to heart failure.

== Published works ==
- Popular Gospel Truths (Chinese: 通傳福音真理報, pinyin: Tōng chuán Fúyīn Zhēnlǐ Bào, 1912)

== See also ==
- Protestant missions in China 1807-1953
- The Pentecostal Movement
- Pentecostalism in China
