= Yu Guozhen =

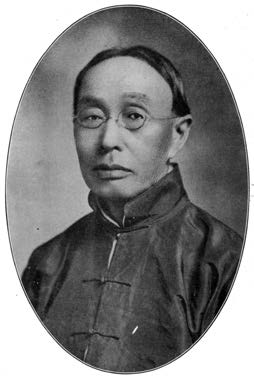

Yu Guozhen (俞國楨, 1852–1932) was a Presbyterian pastor and, in 1906, founded the independent Chinese Christian organization, the China Christian Independent Church.
