= Manabu Waida =

Japanese historian (1936–2000)

Manabu Waida (4 December 1936 – 28 April 2000) was a Japanese historian.

He was born in Osaka and during World War II he moved with his family to Maibara, Shiga. He graduated from Tokyo Union Theological Seminary in 1961 and then served as an assistant pastor for the United Church of Christ in Kochi for three years. On 30 March 1963 he married Kyoko Matsuoka, whom he had met at a conference for United Church youth in Shikoku. After Waida received a request from Tokyo Union Theological Seminary to teach comparative religious studies, he studied religious history and Buddhism at Taisho University.

In 1966 Waida moved to Chicago to study religions at the University of Chicago. In 1970 he decided to remain in North America because of student unrest in Japan and moved to Halifax, Nova Scotia, where he taught at St. Mary's University. In 1974 Waida was awarded a PhD in the history of religions from University of Chicago and in the same year he moved to Edmonton, where he served as professor of religion studies at the University of Alberta.

== Works ==
- 'Symbolism of "Descent" in Tibetan Sacred Kingship and Some East Asian Parallels', Numen, Vol. 20, Fasc. 1 (Apr., 1973), pp. 60-78.
- 'Conceptions of State and Kingship in Early Japan', Zeitschrift für Religions-und Geistesgeschichte, Vol. 28, No. 2 (1976), pp. 97-112.
- 'Sacred Kingship in Early Japan: A Historical Introduction', History of Religions, Vol. 15, No. 4 (May, 1976), pp. 319-342.
- 'Notes on Sacred Kingship in Central Asia', Numen, Vol. 23, Fasc. 3 (Dec., 1976), pp. 179-190.
- 'Symbolisms of the Moon and the Waters of Immortality', History of Religions, Vol. 16, No. 4, The Mythic Imagination (May, 1977), pp. 407-423.
- 'Birds in the Mythology of Sacred Kingship, East and West, Vol. 28, No. 1/4 (December 1978), pp. 283-289.
- 'Central Asian Mythology of the Origin of Death: A Comparative Analysis of Its Structure and History', Anthropos, Bd. 77, H. 5./6. (1982), pp. 663-702.
- 'Problems of Central Asian and Siberian Shamanism', Numen, Vol. 30, Fasc. 2 (Dec., 1983), pp. 215-239.
- 'The Flower Contest between Two Divine Rivals. A Study in Central and East Asian Mythology', Anthropos, Bd. 86, H. 1./3. (1991), pp. 87-109.
- 'The Patterns of Initiation in Japanese Shamanism', Anthropos, Bd. 89, H. 4./6. (1994), pp. 461-469.
