= Reiji Oyama =

Reiji Oyama may refer to:

- Reiji Oyama (pastor)
- Reiji Oyama, a character of the game Power Instinct
