= Spirit of Jesus Church =

Christian church in Japan

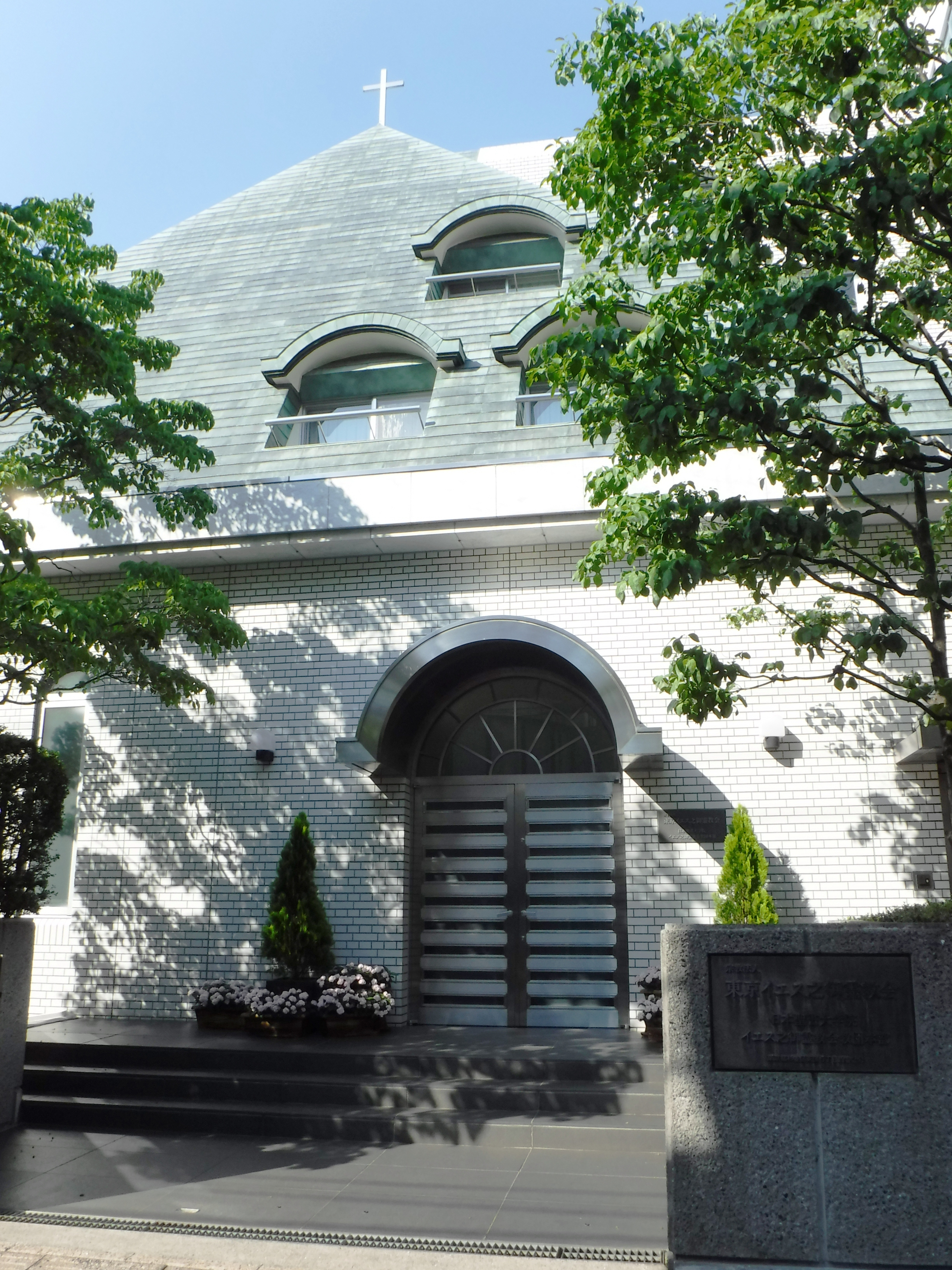
The Spirit of Jesus Church Tokyo (Tōkyō Iesu no Mitama Kyōkai) in Ogikubo, Suginami-ku, Tokyo, Japan.

The Spirit of Jesus Church (イエス之御霊教会, Iesu no Mitama Kyōkai) was registered in 1941 in Japan by Murai Jun. The church was named in accordance with a heavenly vision he reportedly received in 1941. The core mission of the Spirit of Jesus Church is defined in the Gospel of Mark 16:15-18. There he instructed his disciples to preach the gospel and baptize the believers, and promised the power to perform miracles, cast out demons, speaking in tongues, and heal the sick. It is one of the fastest-growing Christian bodies in Japan, having increased its membership from 34,477 in 1970 to 433,108 at the end of the 1980s. Taken at face value, the Spirit of Jesus Church is one of the largest new religious movements in Japan. They also reject the Trinitarian doctrine and claim to be the only true Christian church in the world.

== Doctrines and beliefs ==
They believe in divine health through prayer and anointing with oil because these are practices referred to in the New Testament (James 5:14-16).

They also perform a foot-washing ceremony, which was originally performed by Jesus (John 13). This practice has been revived with some pastors who wash the feet of new members immediately after baptism in the name of Jesus. Foot-washing symbolizes that members have cut ties with the devil and have embarked on a new life, as well as that members should live humbly as in Jesus' example. In addition to these practices, the Spirit of Jesus Church also retains the sacrament of the Lord's Supper.

When the Spirit of Jesus Church presents the Gospel to the newcomers, they invite people to accept Jesus, and encourage them to be baptized in water and Spirit. They sing "Receive the Holy Spirit, receive the baptism in water." The church only performs baptisms in the name of Jesus Christ according to Acts 2:38, 4:12, 8:16, 10:48, 19:5 and Colossians 3:17, and believe that the baptism of the Holy Spirit is received through speaking in tongues according to Acts 2:4, 2:33, 8:14–20, 10:44–46, 11:15–18, 19:1–7, Mark 16:17, and Luke 11:9–13. During prayer sessions, the members continually recite hallelujah until they receive the Holy Spirit. (Hallelujah means 'praise the Lord' in Hebrew.)

== History ==
In a visit he made to Taiwan in 1941, Murai Jun had contact with the True Jesus Church. Thus he joined that Pentecostal apostolic church by accepting the doctrine of the single God, and received baptism in the Holy Spirit, speaking in tongues, and water baptism in the name of Jesus. He also underwent the foot-washing ceremony and believed in the Second Coming of Jesus. He was then baptised as a member of the True Jesus Church.

However, upon his return to Japan, he founded his own denomination, the Spirit of Jesus Church. He claimed that his wife, Suwa, had received a revelation from God in which the name Iesu no Mitama Kyokai (Spirit of Jesus Church) was to be given to designate them as a new church.

Organized as an independent group in 1941, this institution, like many other Christian denominations in Japan, have not experienced significant growth until after World War II. In 1950, the church was built in central Tokyo, and two years later had established a Bible college to train pastors.

After Murai Jun's death in 1970, leadership of the church was passed on to his widow, Murai Suwa. After her death, their daughter Murai Mitsuko became the leader. After her death, Murai Jun's youngest son Murai Junki became the leader in 2000. This appointment was controversial, as many members considered him not a truly believing member of the church, and several congregations broke away from the church to become independent institutions. Murai Junki was replaced by 三戸富夫 (Mito Toshio?) in 2006.

== Relationship with Japanese traditional religion ==
The preaching methods of the Spirit of Jesus Church tend to reiterate the pledges of the spiritual and material blessings for the true believers, with the belief that God complies faithfully to their promises.

The Spirit of Jesus Church engages in spiritual warfare against the Japanese traditional religiosity and condemns the practice as "idolatrous". In their evangelistic campaigns, pastors have invited believers to stay away from pagan idols and refrain from participation in pagan rituals. It also teaches that we must refrain from the practice of traditional rituals of ancestor worship.

The Spirit of Jesus Church considers the Buddhist altar, the hereditary tombstones and amulets of Shintoism as places where evil spirits dwell. According to representatives of the church, ancestor worship is a direct violation of the second commandment that spoke against the worship false gods.

== Vicarious baptism rituals ==
The Spirit of Jesus Church performs baptism for the dead. They link salvific work in the spirit world and the notion of "household" salvation to the supposed ritual of vicarious baptism referred to in 1 Corinthians 15:29. This church claims that through the ritual of vicarious baptism (先祖の身代わり洗礼) that the blessings of individual salvation can be extended to past generations as well. Members of the church can request that ancestors be baptized at the same time they are, or whenever they become concerned about the salvation of those who have gone before. A member states the ancestor's name, announces his or her relationship to the deceased, and then undergoes baptism by immersion on their behalf. It is significant to note here that this church also performs baptism for mizuko (水子, aborted and stillborn children). They claim that "through this ritual the good news of the forgiveness of sins is communicated to the dead, and their spirits are transported from hades to heaven." Members of the church are assured that they may lay aside all their doubts and misgivings regarding the state of their ancestors following this ritual. A pastor of this church in Okinawa explained that prior to the ritual of vicarious baptism many of the members had disturbing visions of the wandering spirits of the dead. Following this ritual care, however, the spirits were felt to be 'at peace' and there were no longer any troubling spiritual encounters.

Concern for the dead does not end with the ritual of baptism. The Common Memorial Service for Comforting of the Spirits is also an important service in all Spirit of Jesus churches. According to a church representative, the significance of this service is that it allows living believers to join with the spirits of the dead in common prayer to Jesus. In this it certainly resembles the Buddhist Obon Festival, and a central motif of which is reunion and fellowship with the dead.

== Scope ==
By 1958, the Spirit of Jesus Church had grown to a number of 28,000 members, becoming the third largest Protestant denomination in Japan. For 1970 it had 453 churches and a membership of 62,726 adherents. The church continued to grow strongly during the decade of the 1970s and has experienced great growth during the last decade. Early in the 1990s the church is believed to have 420,000 members.

The church has recently clarified these statistics by indicating that there is an "active membership" of 23,283 individuals who regularly attend meetings and engage in church activities of one kind or another. One rural church on the island of Shikoku reported a membership of 600; however, regular attendance at weekly meetings in the mother church was from 3 to 15 people. The Tokyo district reports a membership of over 80,000, but attendance at weekly meetings in the main church averages around 500. The Okinawa Spirit of Jesus Church reports a membership of 7,464, but pastors have expressed that active attendance is between 180–200, and 400–500 would attend the Christmas and Easter services. If one generalizes from these three examples, the active membership is probably less than 10% of the total claimed. Although the Spirit of Jesus Church continues to report thousands of baptisms, these claims are not accompanied by a serious increase in active members.
