= Masao Takenaka =

Japanese theologian

Masao Takenaka (June 9, 1925 – August 17, 2006) was a Japanese theologian who taught for over 40 years at Doshisha University in Kyoto, Japan, where he was a Professor of Christian Ethics and Sociology of Religion.

Takenaka was born in Beijing, China in 1925, and lived in China for his first ten years; his father worked for the South Manchuria Railway. He began his studies at Kyoto University, but was drafted into the Japanese army during World War II and sent to Hokkaido. After the war, he completed a degree in business and then studied theology at Doshisha. At the Yale Divinity School in Yale University, he was greatly influenced by H. Richard Niebuhr; he earned his doctorate there in 1955. He returned to Japan, where he became a volunteer leader of the United Church of Christ in Japan, and then served a term as vicar in Kurashiki before joining the Doshisha faculty.

Takenaka was a proponent of ecumenism, an opponent of the concept of the divinity of the Emperor of Japan, and (later in his life) a promoter of Christian art. He was honorary president of the Asian Christian Art Association. He also worked to fit Christian theology more closely to indigenous culture in Asia, for instance by defining God as the "rice of life" instead of as the "bread of life".

== Books ==
Takenaka was the author of several books:

- The development of social, educational and medical work in Japan since Meiji (Van Keulen, 1959)
- Creation and Redemption Through Japanese Art (Sogensha, 1966)
- Reconciliation and renewal in Japan (Friendship Press, 1967)
- Christian Art in Asia, (Kyo Bun Kwan and the Christian Conference of Asia, 1975; World Council of Churches, 1983)
- God Is Rice: Asian Culture and Christian Faith (World Council of Churches, 1986; Wipf & Stock Publishers, 2009)
- Consider the flowers: meditations in ikebana (with Koho Kamiya, Kyo Bun Kwan, 1990)
- The Bible Through Asian Eyes (with Ron O'Grady, Friendship Press, 1991)
- The Place Where God Dwells: An Introduction to Church Architecture in Asia (World Council of Churches, 1995)
- When the bamboo bends: Christ and culture in Japan (World Council of Churches, 2002)
