= Evangelical Free Church of Japan =

Protestant denomination in Japan

- Classification: Protestant
- Orientation: Evangelical
- Associations: Japan Evangelical Association
- Origin: 1949
- Branched from: Evangelical Free Church of America
- Official website: http://efcj.org/

The Evangelical Free Church of Japan (EFCJ) is a Protestant denomination. It was started in 1949 by missionaries from the Evangelical Free Church of America. The Evangelical Free Church of Japan has over 60 churches and was the fastest growing denomination in Japan after World War II. It is a member of the Japan Evangelical Association (JEA).
