= Reiji Oyama (pastor) =

Japanese pastor (1927–2023)

- 尾山令仁
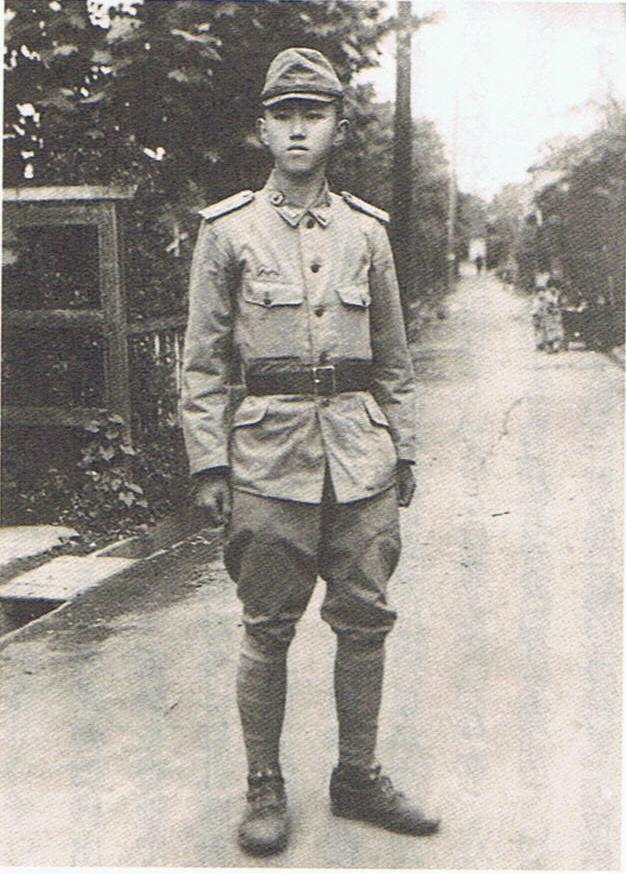
- Oyama in 1944
- Born: January 15, 1927; Tokyo, Japan
- Died: May 16, 2023 (aged 96)
- Occupation: Pastor
- Years active: 1940s–2023
- Known for: the Biblical Church

Reiji Oyama (January 15, 1927 – May 16, 2023) was a Japanese pastor, founder and chancellor of Tokyo Graduate School of Theology, translator of the Bible into Japanese, and author of over 160 books. He was the founding pastor of the Biblical Church, which now has twenty three branch churches.

== Early life ==
Reiji Oyama was born to Toji and Ikuko Oyama in Kanda, Tokyo. He had an older brother, Jyoji and a younger sister, Miyako. During World War II, at the age of 17, Oyama served as a cadet in the Imperial Japanese Army Academy. After World War II was over, he went to Waseda University in Tokyo. At the age of 19, he met Jesus and was dramatically changed at a "GI Gospel Hour" meeting in 1946. Then one morning the Lord spoke to him and called him into the ministry, telling him to serve Him as a pastor. In his last year at Waseda University, he started to attend Tokyo Theological Seminary and graduated in 1953.

== Ministry ==
=== During college and seminary ===
Soon after Oyama was saved, he began to share the gospel with his classmates and later founded the KGK, the "Christian Student Association," as a ministry to college students on campus. The KGK is now a nationwide Christian organization in Japan and a member association of IFES (International Fellowship of Evangelical Students). In 1949, with his five friends, he held a three-day evangelical meeting for students in an auditorium at Waseda University. Fifty to one hundred students were saved each day, and it turned into a three-day revival for college students.

=== Church planting and pastorate ===
On March 15, 1953, Oyama stood on a street near Takadanobaba Station in Tokyo and started to preach the gospel to people. As people came to the Lord, he planted Tkadanobaba Church (later renamed The Biblical Church Tkadanobaba). In the following year, the first baptism service was held, and seven newly saved believers were baptized. In 1966, Oyama planted another church in Kumegawa, Tokyo. New believers were added every year, and as of 2015, the Biblical Church has 23 branch churches.

=== Overseas ministries ===
Serving as the senior pastor at Takadanobaba Church, Oyama began to have a heart for other nations. In 1956, Oyama together with others who had a burden for overseas ministries got together from all over the country, and they decided their first overseas missionary work would be to go to these other Asian countries, who were attacked by Japan during World War II, and apologize and make reparations for the destruction and for any atrocities that occurred. He visited North Korea, South Korea, Philippines, and other Southeast Asian countries and apologized for what Japan had done during World War II.

== Other ministries ==
=== Radio evangelism ===
From 1962 to 1966, Oyama shared the gospel on a radio station called Nippon Broadcasting System, Incorporated (ニッポン放送). It was a midnight program and was the top-rated radio program of the time.

=== Seminary ===
In 1969, he founded a seminary, Tokyo Graduate School of Theology.

=== Unity of Churches ===
Seeing the importance of the unity among local churches, from the 1990s Oyama began a mediating ministry between denominations and local churches. He saw the conflicts among the body of Christ is one of the biggest hindrances to yet-seen revivals. In 1998, during a nationwide meeting (Tokyo Revival Mission), serving as the executive chairman, he encouraged Charismatic churches and Non-Charismatic churches to reconcile to each other.

=== Writings ===
During his career, he wrote over 160 books. In 1960, he translated the Japanese version of the Epistle to Philemon and, in 1983, he also translated the Bible into modern Japanese and published the Modern Japanese Bible.

== Other highlights ==
- He took part in the translating work of the Bible into New Japanese Bible by translating Exodus and Joshua (1970).
- Director, the Japan Evangelical Theological Society (1970-1972).
- Executive Chairman Japan Protestant Conference (1973-1983).
- Vice Executive Chairman of the Billy Graham Crusade held in Tokyo Dome baseball stadium (1980).
- Director, Japan Evangelical Association (1985-1990).

== Death ==
Oyama died on May 16, 2023, at the age of 96.

== Links ==
- Article on the death of ReijiOyama
