= The Biblical Church =

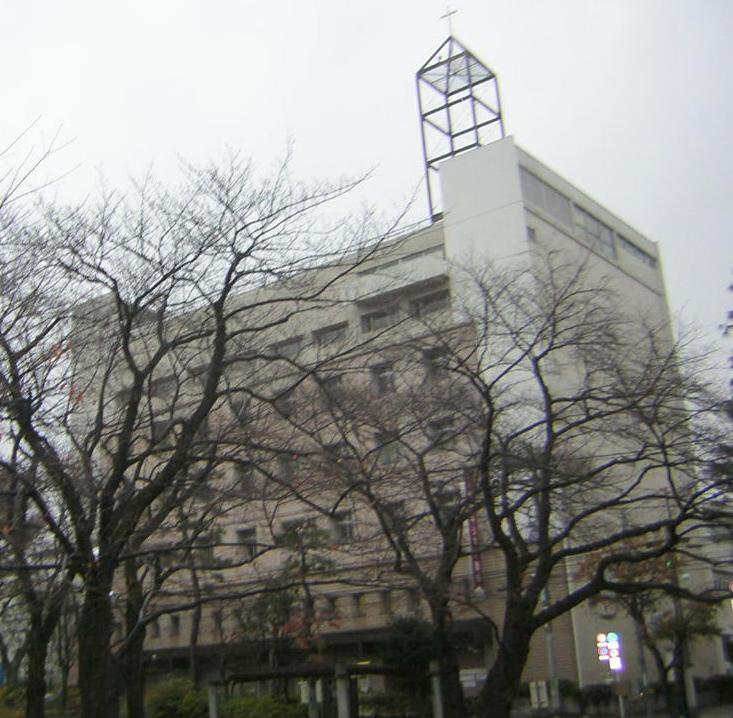
The Biblical Church's Tokyo Church

The Biblical Church (Japanese: 聖書キリスト教会, romanized: Seisho Kirisuto Kyōkai) is a Protestant Christian denomination in Japan that was founded by Reverend Reiji Oyama (尾山令仁牧師) in 1953. The group grew up around him to a Presbyterian Reformed denomination and is evangelical. In 2004 it had 19 congregations and 908 members.

The Biblical Church subscribes to the Apostles Creed, Athanasian Creed, Nicene Creed, and Reformed Confessions like the Heidelberg Catechism, Second Helvetic Confession and the Westminster Confession of Faith. The denomination ordains women to ministry. It is a member of the Japan Evangelical Association.
