= Immanuel General Mission =

The Immanuel General Mission (Immanueru Sogo Dendo Dan) is a holiness denomination based in Japan. It was founded on 21 October 1945 in Tokyo, Japan by David Tsugio Tsutada (born 1906; died July 1971), ""The John Wesley of Japan." (Sigsworth 237) It is a member of the Japan Evangelical Association (JEA).

== History ==
=== Origins ===
David Tsugio Tsutada was the second son of Henry Tsutada, a Japanese Methodist dentist of Singapore. After studying at Anglo-Chinese School (ACS) in Singapore, Tsutada completed high school in Japan. After graduation he studied law at Cambridge University and also at London. Despite his academic success, Tsutada believed he was called to become a preacher, and so terminated his legal studies and returned to Japan to attend Bible College. Prior to graduation, his college president chose a Christian woman, Nobuko, for him to marry. Tsutada was effective in reaching the poor and marginalised of Tokyo, resulting in several conversions to Christianity. David and Nobuko had five children: John Makoto, Mary Migiwa, Joshua Tadashi, and twins Grace Midorino and Margaret Makiba.

At the outbreak of World War II, Tsutada refused to erect a Japanese flag in front of his church and bow deeply to the Emperor in the direction of the imperial palace, saying "only God in heaven is divine. We worship Him alone". On 26 June 1942, Tsutada was arrested, along with about 130 others who likewise refused to comply with the regulation. (Keyes 100)After two years, Tsutada was convicted, but released on probation. After the war ended, Tsutada decided to build a church in Tokyo, naming it "Immanuel" because "You, O God, are with us, just as you were in the cell with me." The Immanuel General Mission was organised on 21 October 1945 in Tokyo.

=== Immanuel Bible Training College (1949) ===
Immanuel Bible Training College in Yokohama, Japan, was founded by David Tsutada in 1949 in Urawa, a city 30 kilometres north of central Tokyo. The college trains young men and women for ministry as pastors in the Immanuel General Mission church of Japan. In 1968, the college moved to Yokohama, which was then a rural area. Today, the campus is surrounded by new homes and businesses, and Yokohama is considered part of the greater Tokyo area.

Each year, Immanuel ministers to approximately 10 students. Students at Immanuel must have a definite call to ministry before being accepted for training and education. Most students come from the Immanuel General Mission denomination, but many students from other denominations have also prepared for ministry at the school.

=== Current ===
The current president of the IGM is Dr. Isaac Teruo Saoshiro, who also pastors the IGM's mother church, Nakameguro in Tokyo, and serves on the board of the World Gospel Mission.

== Affiliations and Partnerships ==
The Immanuel General Mission is affiliated with the Christian Holiness Partnership. Additionally, the IGM partners with the Japanese offices of the World Mission department of the Wesleyan Church and the World Gospel Mission through the Immanuel Wesleyan Federation, a cooperative mission organisation formed in 1954.

=== South India Bible Seminary (1984) ===
South India Bible Institute (now South India Biblical Seminary) first opened its doors on 16 November 1937 in Madras (now Chennai). The seminary’s basic purpose is to train Indian young people for Christian ministry. In 1972, SIBS was reorganized into an indigenous organization with an Indian governing board. The seminary was restructured again in 1981 to include the Church of the Nazarene as a partner with World Gospel Mission. Immanuel General Mission of Japan became a partner in 1984. Most of the seminary’s professors are Indian.

== Sources and further reading ==
- Casiño, T.C. "A Worldview Approach to Designing Missions Strategies Among Asian Cultures."
- Fujimoto, Mitsuru. "The Exclusion Principle as a Black Curtain: An Inquiry from Theological Anthropology" (排他主義という黒幕—神学的人間論からの考察). Translated by Cynthia Dufty. Japan Evangelical Association Theological Commission Pamphlet 6 (May 2006): 37-48. Mitsuru Fujimoto is a professor at Immanuel Bible Training College and a lecturer at Aoyama Gakuin University. He is the pastor of Immanuel Takatsu Christ Church.
- Johnson, Edna Kimery. The House of Tsutada: The Little Man with a Big God. (Family Missionary Series). Wesley Press, 1988.
- Jones, Charles Edwin. The Wesleyan Holiness Movement: A Comprehensive Guide. 2 vols. (ATLA Bibliography Series). Rev. ed. Scarecrow Press, 2005. See page 580.
- Keyes, Lawrence E. The Last Age of Missions: A Study of Third World Missionary Societies. Pasadena, CA: William Carey Library, 1983. See page 100 regarding IGM and David Tsutada.
- Lau, Earnest. "The House of Tsutada." Methodist Message (Singapore) (June 2004).
- Nakada, Bishop Juji. Japan in the Bible. Trans. David T. Tsutada. Oriental Missionary Society, Japan Holiness Church Publishing Department, 1933.
- Saoshiro, Isaac Teruo and Tadashi Noda, eds. Immanuel Wesleyan Federation: Experiment in Mission Partnership. Japan, 2004. Written on the occasion of the 50th anniversary of IWF, a cooperative mission organization made up of Immanuel General Mission, based in Japan, and the Japanese offices of World Gospel Mission and Wesleyan World Mission.
- Sigsworth, John Wilkins. World-changers: Karl Marx and John Wesley. Easingwold Publications, 1982. See page 237 regarding Tsutada. Identifies him as A Japanese Wesleyan Methodist pastor and scholar.
- Trachsel, Laura. Kindled Fires in Asia. Marion, IN: World Gospel Mission, 1960.
- Tsutada, David Tsugio. 20 Years Retrospect of Immanuel General Mission in Japan. [Inmanueru nijū-nenshi: sōsetsu yori no kaisō, 1945-1965]. Tokyo, Japan: Immanuel General Mission in Japan, 1965. Text is in Japanese.
- Tsutada, John M. "Obituary: The Life of Dr. David T. Tsutada." (1971)
- Tsutada, Joshua T. "An Ambassador in Chains." In Christian Suffering in Asia-The Blood of the Martyrs Is the Seed of the Church. Edited by Bong Rin Ro. Evangelical Fellowship of Asia, 1989.
- Tsutada, Tsugio. Tsutada Tsugio zenshū. Immanuel Sōgō Dendōdan. Inochi no Kotobasha, 1988. ISBN 4-264-00946-4.
- World Gospel Mission. Personnel, Progress, Prospects of World Gospel Mission. Marion, IN: World Gospel Mission, 1957.
