= David Tsugio Tsutada =

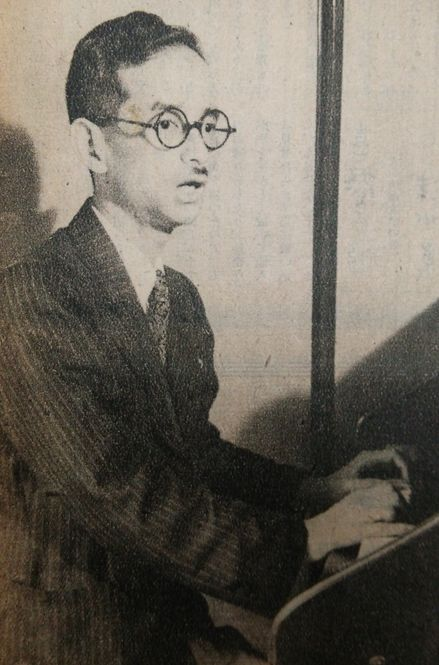
Tsutada photographed on 8 October 1947

David Tsugio Tsutada (1906 – 25 July 1971), known as "The John Wesley of Japan," was the founder of the Immanuel General Mission (Immaneru Sogo Dendo Dan), an indigenous Japanese holiness denomination founded on 21 October 1945 in Tokyo, Japan.

== Personal life and career ==
David Tsugio Tsutada was the second son of Kenri "Henry" Tsutada, a Japanese Methodist dentist of Singapore. After studying at Anglo-Chinese School (ACS) in Singapore, Tsutada completed high school in Japan. After graduation, he studied law at the University of Cambridge. He subsequently graduated from the University of London. Despite his academic success, Tsutada believed he was called to become a preacher, and so terminated his legal studies and returned to Japan to attend Bible College. Prior to graduation, his college president chose a Christian woman, Nobuko, for him to marry. Tsutada was effective in reaching the poor and marginalised of Tokyo, resulting in several conversions to Christianity. David and Nobuko had five children: John Makoto, Mary Migiwa, Joshua Tadashi, and twins Grace Midorino and Margaret Makiba.

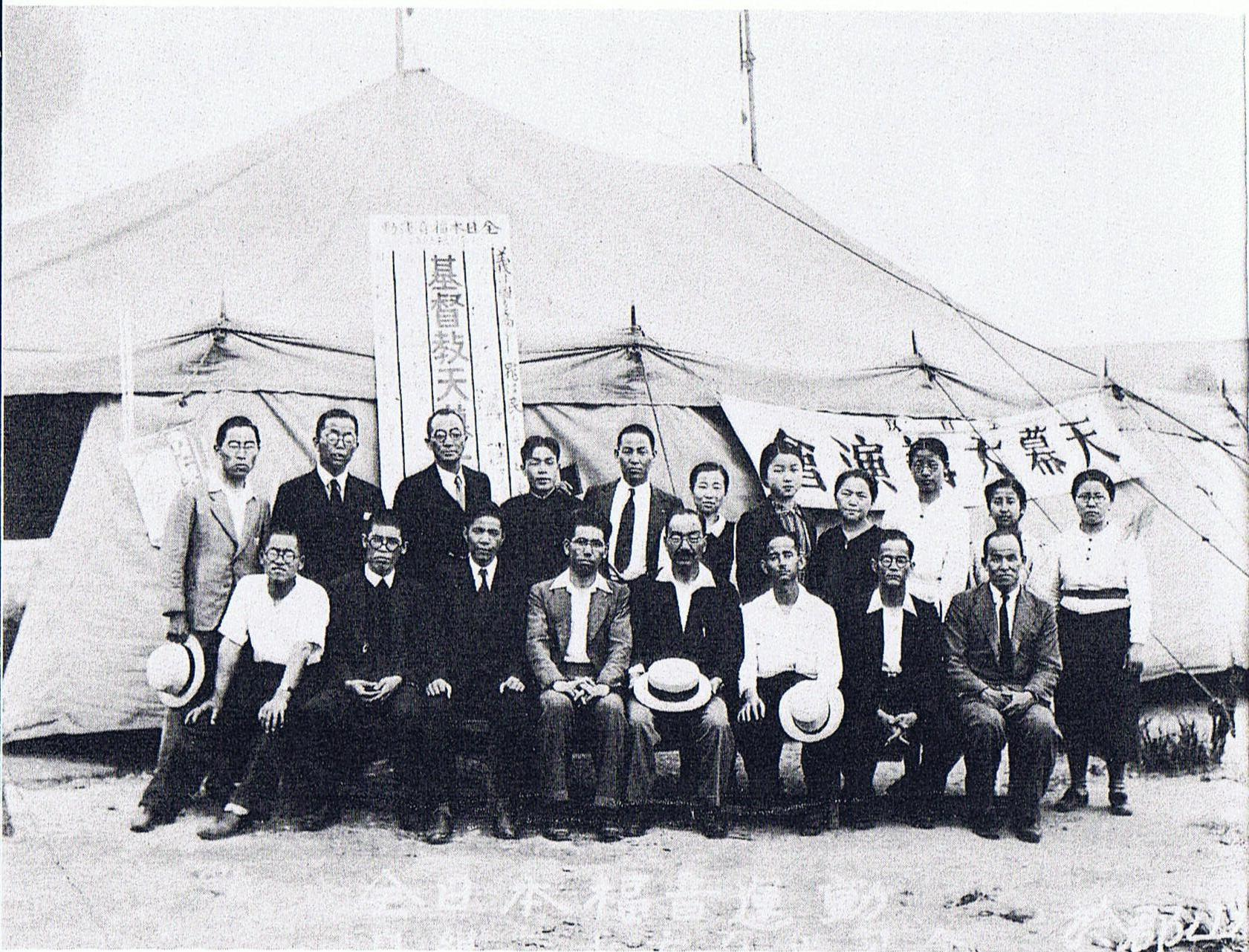
Tsutada at a Revival League event in 1940

At the outbreak of World War II, Tsutada refused to erect a Japanese flag in front of his church and bow deeply to the Emperor in the direction of the imperial palace, saying "only God in heaven is divine. We worship Him alone". On 26 June 1942, Tsutada was arrested, along with about 130 others who likewise refused to comply with the regulation. After two years in solitary confinement in Sugamo Prison, Tsutada was convicted, but released on probation. After the war ended, Tsutada decided to build a church in Tokyo, naming it "Immanuel" because "You, O God, are with us, just as you were in the cell with me." The Immanuel General Mission was organised on 21 October 1945 in Tokyo.

In 1949 Tsutada founded the Immanuel Bible Training College in Urawa, a city 30 kilometres north of central Tokyo, and became its first president.

Tsutada died on 25 July 1971.

== Legacy ==
John, his eldest son, took over as President of the Bible Training College (BTC), Pastor of the Tokyo Central Church and the head of the Tsutada family. John's eight children went into full-time Christian work as staff members of the Tokyo Central Church, missionaries overseas, and one of them in medical work.

John's brothers and sisters actively supported the Mission and together, continued to serve the Lord in Japan and elsewhere. Mary, a fine scholar, enrolled at the BTC, married her brother's friend Benjamin Saoshiro, but died prematurely, but not before her son, Ken, became a Christian. Benjamin became pastor, teacher, translator of songs and books from English to Japanese and took charge of the missionaries from Immanuel Church.

Joshua, the third sibling, after graduation from Rikkyo University, studied at BTC, then at Union Biblical Seminary in Yavatmal, India where, after graduation, he stayed on as registrar and preached during the weekends for a total of 14 years. Returning to Japan he pastored a church in Kyushu, and after his brother John became Chairman of Education, Joshua succeeded him as President of the Bible Training College. He serves also as Chairman of the Evangelical Fellowship of Asia.

Grace and Margaret both studied at BTC and alternated pastoring and looking after their mother. Margaret went on to do pastoral work not far from Tokyo, and later was sent to begin a church at Beppu. Eventually, her work led her to marrying Benjamin Saoshiro in 1988.

== Sources and further reading ==
- Griffiths, Michael. Lambs Dancing with Wolves: A Manual for Christian Workers Overseas. Kregel, 2001. See page 160 regarding Tsutada.
- Johnson, Edna Kimery. The House of Tsutada: The Little Man with a Big God. (Family Missionary Series). Wesley Press, 1988.
- Jones, Charles Edwin. The Wesleyan Holiness Movement: A Comprehensive Guide. 2 vols. (ATLA Bibliography Series). Rev. ed. Scarecrow Press, 2005. See page 580.
- Keyes, Lawrence E. The Last Age of Missions: A Study of Third World Missionary Societies. Pasadena, CA: William Carey Library, 1983. See page 100 regarding IGM and David Tsutada.
- Lau, Earnest. "The House of Tsutada." Methodist Message (Singapore) (June 2004).
- Nakada, Bishop Juji. Japan in the Bible. Trans. David T. Tsutada. Oriental Missionary Society, Japan Holiness Church Publishing Department, 1933.
- Saoshiro, Isaac Teruo and Tadashi Noda, eds. Immanuel Wesleyan Federation: Experiment in Mission Partnership. Japan, 2004. Written on the occasion of the 50th anniversary of IWF, a cooperative mission organisation made up of Immanuel General Mission, based in Japan, and the Japanese offices of World Gospel Mission and Wesleyan World Mission.
- Sigsworth, John Wilkins. World-changers: Karl Marx and John Wesley. Easingwold Publications, 1982. See page 237 regarding Tsutada. Identifies him as A Japanese Wesleyan Methodist pastor and scholar.
- Trachsel, Laura. Kindled Fires in Asia. Marion, IN: World Gospel Mission, 1960.
- Tsutada, David T. Joy Overflowing. Trans. Moon Kyung Cho. Seoul: Korean Nazarene Publishing House, 1992. Korean language.
- Tsutada, David T. Life Sanctified. Trans. Moon Kyung Cho. Seoul: Christian Literature Crusade, 1991. Korean language.
- Tsutada, David Tsugio. 20 Years Retrospect of Immanuel General Mission in Japan. [Inmanueru nijū-nenshi: sōsetsu yori no kaisō, 1945–1965]. Tokyo, Japan: Immanuel General Mission in Japan, 1965. Text is in Japanese.
- Tsutada, John M. "Obituary: The Life of Dr. David T. Tsutada." (1971)
- Tsutada, Tsugio. Tsutada Tsugio zenshū. Immanuel Sōgō Dendōdan. Inochi no Kotobasha, 1988. ISBN 4-264-00946-4.
- World Gospel Mission. Personnel, Progress, Prospects of World Gospel Mission. Marion, IN: World Gospel Mission, 1957.
