= Kazoh Kitamori =

Kazoh Kitamori (北森 嘉蔵, Kitamori Kazō; 1916 – September 1998) was a Japanese theologian, pastor, author, professor, and churchman. His most famous work in the West is The Theology of the Pain of God, which was published in 1946 in Japan and in the United States in 1965. He was a longtime professor at Tokyo Union Theological Seminary. He was, along with Kōsuke Koyama, a leading contributor to Protestant Christian theology from twentieth century Japan.

== Life ==
Kitamori was born in Kumamoto in 1916. In high school, he was so impressed by a paper he read about Martin Luther that he made the decision in 1935 to go to Tokyo to attend the Lutheran Theological Seminary there. He graduated in 1938. Having finished his studies at the seminary, he attended Kyoto Imperial University, studying in the literature department under Hajime Tanabe, a disciple of Japanese philosopher Kitarō Nishida. He graduated from the university in 1941, and continued there as an assistant until 1943. In 1943, he moved to the Eastern Japan Theological Seminary, which later became Tokyo Union Theological Seminary. He became a full professor in 1949, and continued to teach systematic (dogmatic) theology there until his retirement from teaching in 1984. He received a Ph.D. in Literature from Kyoto Imperial University in 1962.

Kitamori was a major post-war theologian in Japan and this status made him one of the most important players in the re-formation of the Kyodan Church (United Church of Christ in Japan). He served both as a pastor, serving a congregation for forty-six years, and as a churchman, serving in various capacities and helping to draft of the confession of faith of the Kyodan Church.

While he is best known for Theology of the Pain of God, Kitamori was a prolific writer in many areas, not only in theology. He published forty-two books and many articles. His theme of the Pain of God remained a central idea in many of these. Theology of the Pain of God has reached a wide audience in Japan, even outside the Christian community.

== The Pain of God ==
Kitamori's most famous work discusses idea of the pain of God. He bases this idea on Jeremiah 31:20:

"Is not Ephraim my dear son, the child in whom I delight? Though I often speak against him, I still remember him. Therefore my heart yearns for him; I have great compassion for him," declares the LORD. (NIV)

In the Japanese Literary Version (an older translation of the Bible into Japanese), the phrase, "My heart yearns..." can be translated "My heart is pained." Luther matches this idea most closely when he translates it "Darum bricht mir mein Herz" (Therefore, my heart is broken). While modern Japanese versions were moving away from this translation, Kitamori felt that translators like Luther and Calvin gave him scholarly justification for keeping this translation as the basis of his work.

Kitamori linked the Japanese concepts of tsutsumu and tsuraso, natural love and self-sacrificial death, with Christian principles.

Jürgen Moltmann sees Kitamori's theology useful in explaining how the pain of God helps to heal our pain, because in "the suffering of Christ God himself suffers."

== Other sources ==
- Hashimoto, Akio. "Legacy of Kitamori in Contemporary Japanese Christian Thought." Missio Apostolica, XII, 1, May 2004, pp. 11–16.
- Meyer, Richard. "Toward a Japanese Theology: Kitamori's Theology of the Pain of God." Concordia Theological Monthly, XXXIII, 5, May 1962, pp. 261–272.
