= Japan Evangelical Association =

- Founded: 1968
- Type: Evangelical organization
- Purpose: Evangelical Christianity
- Location: Japan
- Affiliations: World Evangelical Alliance
- Website: www.jeanet.org

Japan Evangelical Association (JEA) is a national evangelical alliance in Japan, member of the World Evangelical Alliance.

== History ==
The Association is founded in 1968.

== Member denominations ==
- Immanuel General Mission
- The Salvation Army
- Evangelical Free Church of Japan
- Living Christ One Ear of Wheat Church
- Japan Evangelistic Band
- The Biblical Church
- Japan Assemblies of God
