= Murai Jun =

Murai Jun (村井ジュン, 1897 - 1970) was the founder of what is regarded today as the largest indigenous church in Japan - Iesu no Mitama Kyōkai, was born into a Methodist family in Tokyo and later studied theology at Aoyama College. While he was studying there, something troubled him deeply to the point of anticipating suicide. Hence Murai planned to jump overboard a ferry near Okayama Prefecture during 1918. However, when he was about to jump overboard, he felt that the Holy Spirit's presence suddenly overwhelmed him and he began speaking in tongues. That experience gave him new courage to accept the Christian faith and his previous lack of confidence in the religion was now eliminated. Murai then abandoned Aoyama College to begin preaching the gospel. Not long afterwards, he was assigned as a pastor for the Japan Bible Church. In 1933, Murai informed his small church group in Tokyo's Nishisugamo of his Pentecostal experience which had changed his life.

During 1941, whilst in Taiwan, he came across the True Jesus Church, and indigenous Chinese church that had only been established for over 20 years. He accepted the main doctrines of the church and received baptism; he then left his previous church denomination. However, during that year, Murai's wife claimed that she had received a revelation from God to establish a new church which was to be given the name イエス(Iesu) 之(no) 御霊(Mitama) 教会(Kyōkai) (Spirit of Jesus Church).

== Notes and references ==
1. The Japan Bible Church later became the Japan Assemblies of God in 1949.
2. Yoshiyama Hiroshi, ed., Led by the Spirit: A history of the first thirty years (Tokyo Assemblies of God, 1979), p. 23
