= Japan Assemblies of God =

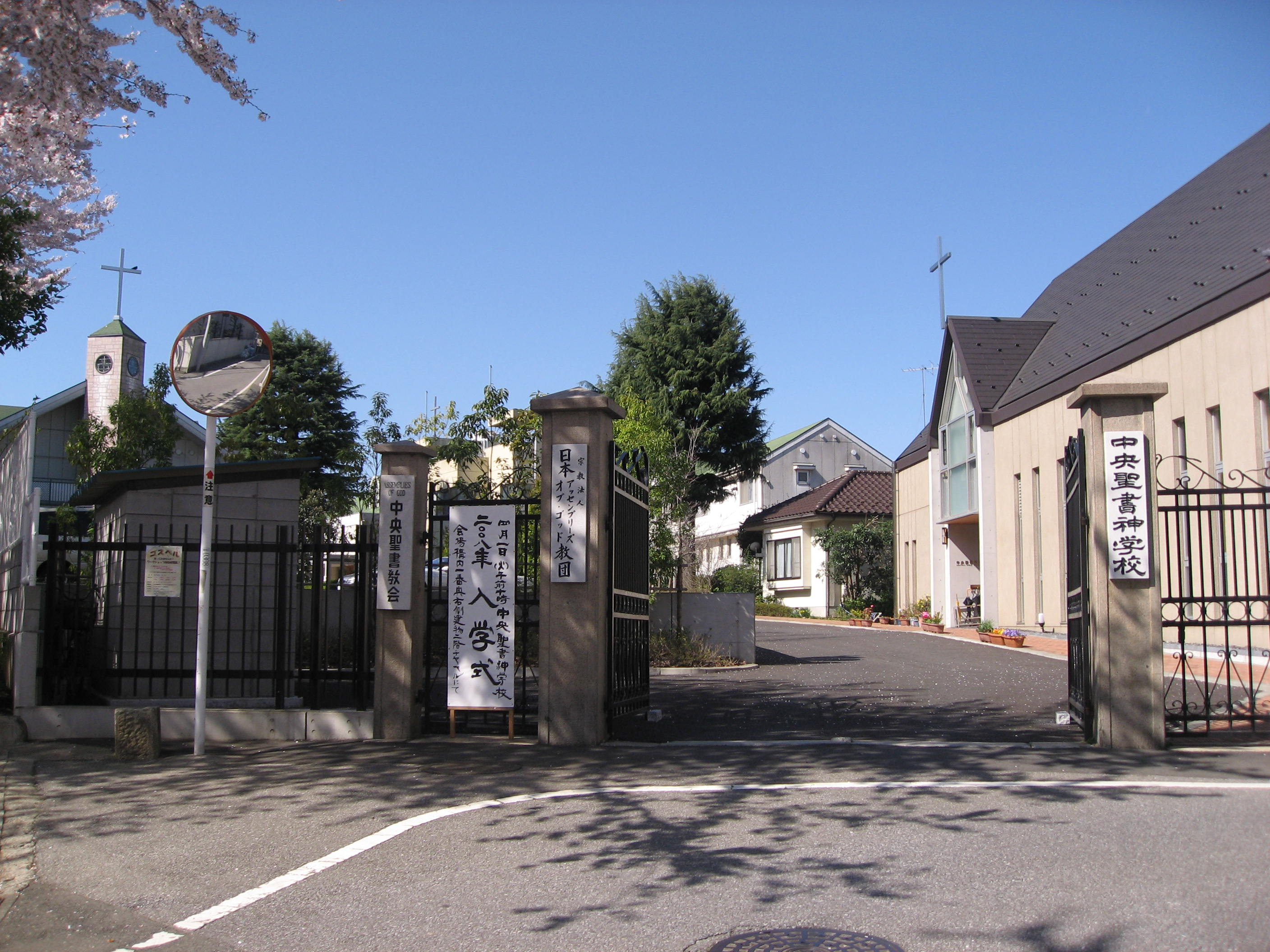
Front gate of the Japan Assemblies of God.

The Japan Assemblies of God (Japanese:日本アッセンブリ－ズ・オブ・ゴッド教団 Nihon Assenburiizu obu Goddo Kyodan) is a Pentecostal Christian denomination in Japan affiliated with the World Assemblies of God Fellowship. It claims 10,766 adherents and 211 churches. It is also a member of the Japan Evangelical Association.

== History ==
In 1913, the missionaries Carl and Frederike Juergensen arrived in Japan and began evangelizing the populace. In 1914, the Assemblies of God in the United States of America was formed, and the Juergensens became the first Assemblies of God missionaries to Japan. An Assemblies of God USA affiliated district of Japan was organized under the direction of missionaries in 1920. Under pressure from the Japanese wartime government, Assemblies of God churches joined the United Church of Christ in Japan in 1941 but withdrew after World War II. In 1949, the self-governing Japan Assemblies of God was formed with 19 ministers and 17 congregations.
