= Okinawa Christian Gospel =

The Okinawa Christian Gospel (沖縄キリスト教福音, Okinawa Kirisutokyō Fukuin) is an independent Japanese church founded by Nakahara Masao (仲原正夫) in 1977. Nakahara Masao was born in the town of Itoman on the main island of Okinawa in 1948. His father died when he was still a young child and he grew up in very difficult circumstances. Following high school he moved to Kyoto and enrolled in a professional school in order to obtain credentials as a radiologist. It was while he was in Kyoto that he began to attend services at a Plymouth Brethren Church. Within three months he converted to the Christian faith and received baptism. Nakahara returned to Okinawa to work as a radiologist in a local hospital. In 1977 an experience of divine healing and revelation from God led him to resign from his position as a radiographer to devote the remainder of his life to evangelistic work. His independent Christian fellowship grew rapidly and in less than twenty years had six branch churches, two mission outreach centers, and a membership of approximately 1,500. The movement also maintains several residences to care for individuals who are troubled by various spiritual and psychological problems. This is a charismatic movement in which the practices of speaking in tongues, prophecy, healing, and exorcism play a central role.
