= Tokyo Union Theological Seminary =

- Tōkyō shingaku daigaku
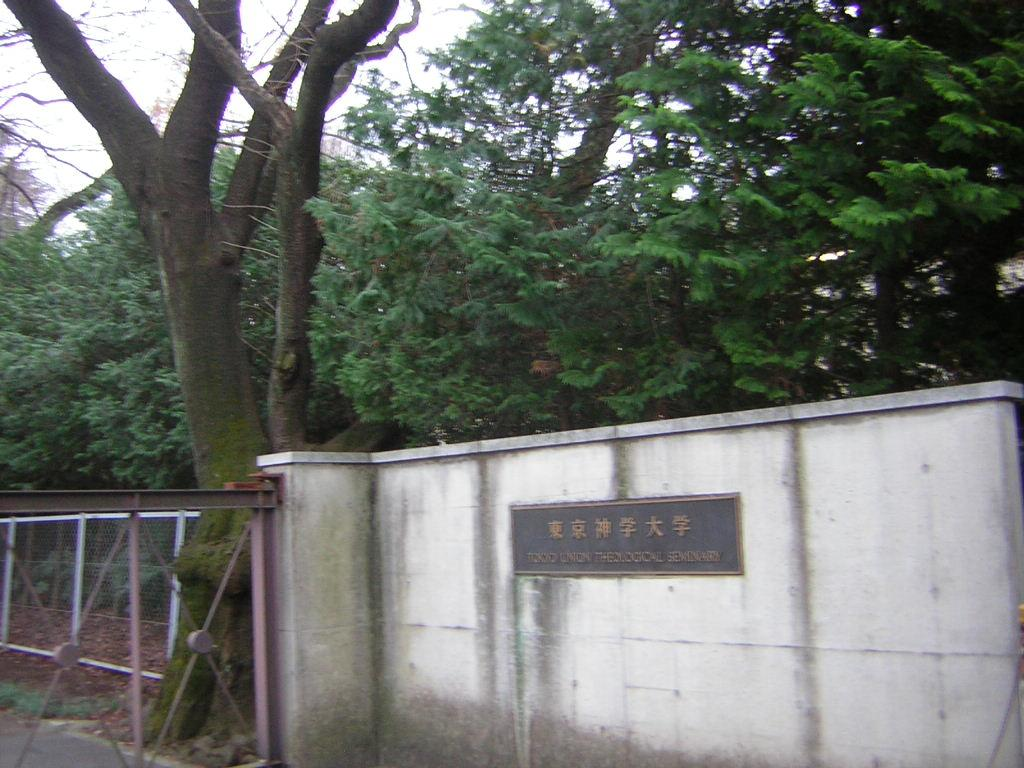
- Type: Private
- Established: 1930
- Religious affiliation: United Church of Christ in Japan
- President: Tsutomu Haga
- Location: 3-10-30, Osawa, Mitaka, Tokyo, 181-0015, Japan; 35°41′17.8″N 139°32′2.8″E
- Campus: Suburb
- Language: Japanese
- Website: www.tuts.ac.jp/english/

Tokyo Union Theological Seminary (東京神学大学, Tōkyō shingaku daigaku) is a private university in Mitaka, Tokyo, Japan. The predecessor of the school was founded in 1930, and it was chartered as a university in 1949.

Tokyo Union Theological Seminary is a Seminary of the United Church of Christ in Japan.

== Faculty ==
- Kazoh Kitamori, author of Theology of the Pain of God
