= Zhang Lingsheng =

Ling-Sheng Zhang (Chinese: 張靈生, Pinyin: Zhāng Língshēng; 1863 – ?) was a Chinese evangelist, born in Shandong. Zhang converted to Christianity at the age of thirty seven and became a member of the Presbyterian church for seven years and was then appointed as a Deacon for three years.

In 1909 after hearing a testimony from a church Elder, Ling-sheng went to the Shanghai Apostolic Faith Mission to study. Zhang returned home on 21 December of that same year and entered a church hall one morning in order to pray alone. It was at this time he began experiencing glossolalia, claiming to have been inspired by the Holy Spirit.

The following year after closely studying the Seventh-day Adventist doctrines, he subsequently changed his Sabbath services to Saturdays instead of Sunday. During 1913 and 1914 Ling-Sheng began forming the "True Jesus Church" and held services at his home with friends and relatives.

In 1917 Ling-Sheng went to the Church of God in Beijing and there he met an American missionary named Berntsen who also kept the Sabbath on Saturdays and whom preached on issues concerning the baptism of the Holy Spirit. Ling-sheng then accepted the laying on of hands by Berntsen and two other Elders and as a result was ordained as a Deacon.

In the Spring of 1918, Ling-sheng started preaching the gospel of the True Jesus Church in co-operation with Paul Wei, another co-worker. Most of their labour was concentrated in the Northern regions of China. Ling-Sheng later returned to his hometown of Shandong and settled down and became the pastor of the local church.

According to oral source from some priest in True Jesus Church, in his later life, he was experiencing "spiritual laughing" for two years until his death.

== See also ==
- Protestant missions in China
- Barnabas Zhang

== Notes ==
1. The Apostolic Faith Mission's three basic faiths were:
  1. Receiving the gift of the Holy Spirit through speaking in tongues,
  2. belief in the One True God instead of Trinity and
  3. performing baptism in the name of the Lord Jesus (instead of the Father and the Holy Spirit).
  4. Berntsen 's Apostolic Faith church also performed feet washing. However his church later changed to the Church of God and later switched again to the Assembly of God.
