= Christ Heart Church =

Religious movement

The Christ Heart Church (Japanese: 基督心宗教団) is a new religious movement that was formed in 1927. Its founder, Kawai Shinsui (川合信水, 1867–1962), reinterpreted the faith through the lenses of Confucian and Buddhist traditions by claiming that Christianity offers a more complete path of self-cultivation and advocates traditional Buddhist disciplines of meditation to achieve a Christian satori (enlightenment). Zen meditation and kyōkenjutsu (強健術) became important means of development in the Christ Heart Church.

In sharp contrast to Protestant missionary policy, the Christ Heart Church allow its members to maintain the traditional Buddhist altar in the home. They also see no conflict between Christian faith and ancestor veneration. Members are encouraged to show "proper respect" toward traditional customs, and the church supports participation in Buddhist ancestral rites with non-Christian family members.
