= Japan Baptist Convention =

- Classification: Evangelicalism
- Theology: Baptist
- Associations: Baptist World Alliance
- Headquarters: Saitama
- Origin: 1947
- Congregations: 320
- Members: 13,975
- Seminaries: Tokyo Baptist Theological Seminary
- Official website: bapren.jp

The Japan Baptist Convention (日本バプテスト連盟, Nippon Baputesuto Renmei) is a Baptist Christian denomination in Japan. It is affiliated with the Baptist World Alliance. The headquarters is in Saitama.

== History ==
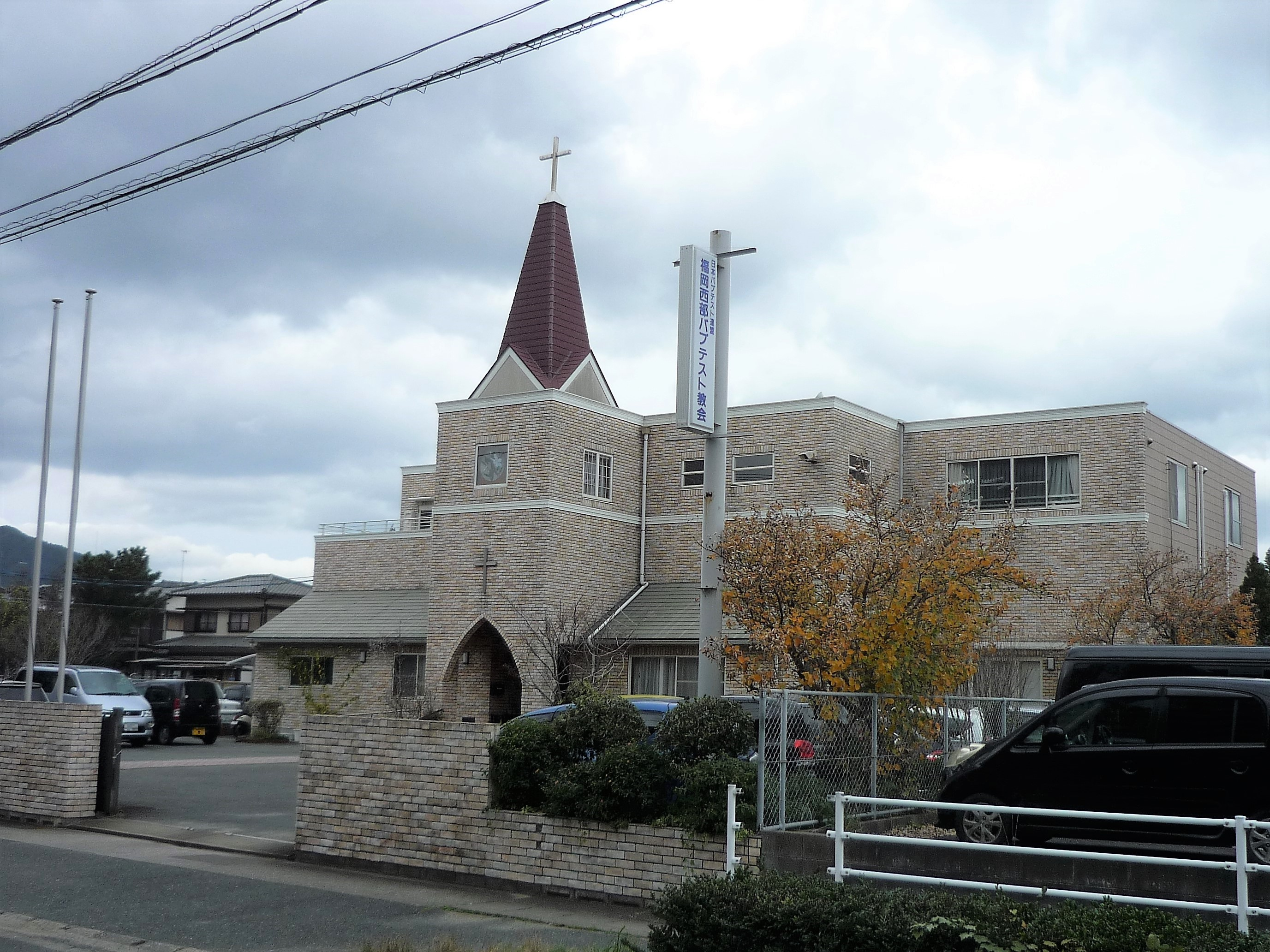
Fukuoka Seibu Baptist Church

The Convention has its origins in an American mission of the International Mission Board in southwestern Japan in 1889. It was officially founded in 1947. According to a census published by the association in 2023, it claimed 320 churches and 13,975 members.

== Schools ==
In 1962, it founded the Tokyo Baptist Theological Seminary. Alumni of the Tokyo Baptist Theological Seminary include Sayuri Kume.

== Bibliography ==
- The Southern Baptist Mission in Japan, 1889–1989, by F. Calvin Parker (University Press of America, 1991)
