= Paul Wei =

Chinese evangelist (1879–1919)

- 魏保羅
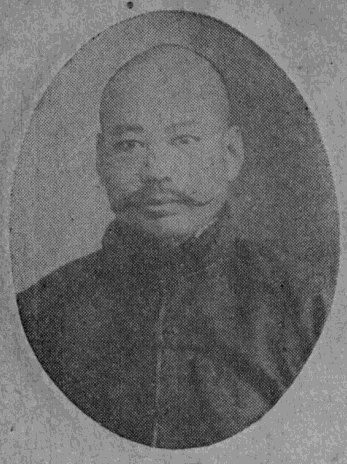

Personal life
- Born: 魏恩波 (Wei Enbo); 1879 Hebei, China
- Died: 10 September 1919 (aged 39–40)
- Children: Wei Wenxiang

Religious life
- Religion: True Jesus Church, denomination of Christianity

Paul Wei (Chinese: 魏保羅; pinyin: Wèi Bǎoluó; 1879–1919), also known as Wei Embo / Wei Enbo (Chinese: 魏恩波) was a Chinese evangelist and the founder of the True Jesus Church (Chinese: 真耶穌教會; pinyin: Zhēn Yēsū Jiàohuì).

== Biography ==
Born in Hebei, China, Wei was a poor farmer who moved to Beijing. There, he started working as a street vendor but eventually became the prosperous owner of several clothing shops. He attributed his newfound prosperity to his conversion to Christianity. He had joined the Beijing branch of the London Missionary Society led by British missionary Samuel Evans Meech (1845–1937). Meech would baptize Wei in 1904. When attending the London Missionary Society, Wei was also influenced by Cheng Jingyi, and espoused some teachings of the Seventh-day Adventist Church.

In 1915, Wei met Norwegian missionary to China Bernt Berntsen, became a Pentecostal and joined his Apostolic Faith Mission. In May 1917, Wei reportedly heard a voice telling him that "you must receive the baptism of Jesus". He felt he should go to the Yongdingmen gate in Beijing, where the voice asked him to proceed to a nearby river where, as he reported, Jesus appeared and personally baptized him facedown, giving him an armor and a sword. Satan also appeared, but Wei defeated him with the sword received from Jesus. After this vision, Wei left the Apostolic Faith Church and founded his own church, which he called the True Jesus Church. His followers believed that Wei’s vision had restored the original Christian church. They hailed Wei as "the new Martin Luther", commissioned by Jesus to reform and restore the genuine Christian Church.

Wei changed his named to Paul, after the apostle.

Despite oppositions, including by Berntsen, who sued Wei claiming he had defrauded him of revenues of a business partnership they had established together, the True Jesus Church was able to gather several thousand members. Wei predicted that the world will end in 1921 or 1922. He died of tuberculosis on 10 September 1919, and the failure of his prophecy did not prevent the further growth of the True Jesus Church.

Among several leaders, his son Wei Wenxiang (魏文祥, Isaac Wei, 魏以撒, c. 1900–?) emerged as the main representative of the True Jesus Church, until he was arrested in 1951. The True Jesus Church was severely persecuted before and during the Cultural Revolution, but was again allowed to operate in China in the 1980s, gathering a substantial following.

== See also ==
- Protestant missions in China 1807-1953
- True Jesus Church
