= True Jesus Church =

Christian Church originating in China

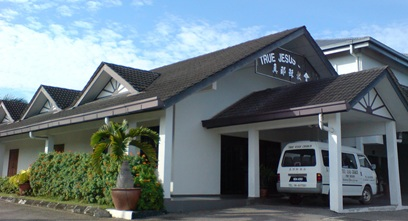
- The True Jesus Church Olive Garden Training Centre, Port Dickson, Malaysia
- Abbreviation: TJC
- Established: 1917 (109 years ago)
- Founder: Paul Wei
- Founded at: Beijing, China
- Type: Christian Church
- Headquarters: Lakewood, California
- Region served: 60+ countries
- Members: 1,500,000–3,000,000 (2013)
- Official language: English, Chinese, Japanese, Korean, Indonesian, Malay, German, Spanish, French, Portuguese, Russian, Vietnamese, Cambodian
- Key people: Paul Wei, Ling-Sheng Zhang, and Barnabas Zhang (early workers)
- Main organ: International Assembly
- Affiliations: Non-denominational Christianity; Oneness Pentecostalism
- Website: tjc.org

True Jesus Church
- Traditional Chinese: 真耶穌教會
- Simplified Chinese: 真耶稣教会
Transcriptions
Standard Mandarin
- Hanyu Pinyin: Zhēn Yēsū Jiàohuì

The True Jesus Church (TJC) is a non-denominational Christian church and originated in Beijing, China, during the Pentecostal movement in the early twentieth century. The True Jesus Church is currently one of the largest Christian groups in China, as well as one of the largest independent churches in the world. The TJC holds a Oneness Pentecostal view of God and teaches a Sabbatarian doctrine.

== History ==
The TJC emerged independently alongside other indigenous Christian groups of that period such as the Little Flock, the Jesus Family and The Christian Tabernacle.

Established in 1917 by Wei Embo, a silk merchant who later adopted the Christian name Paul, the church's early adherents in Hebei and Shandong were influenced by certain charismatic practices of the Apostolic Faith Mission in China, the Seventh-day Adventist Church, and the Pentecostal Assemblies of the World—especially faith healing, baptism of the Holy Spirit, footwashing, and Sabbath keeping.

Paul Wei (Wei Embo, 1877–1919) was one of the early workers. A former member of the Beijing branch of the London Missionary Society led by British missionary Samuel Evans Meech (1845–1937), Wei became a Pentecostal under the influence of Norwegian missionary to China, Bernt Berntsen. In 1917, he left Berntsen's group as the Holy Spirit had moved him. He died of tuberculosis on September 10, 1919, and the pause of his prophecy did not prevent the further growth of the TJC.

TJC's other early workers included Zhang Lingsheng (1863–?), who convinced Wei that the church should maintain a seventh-day Sabbath, and Barnabas Zhang (1882–1961), who eventually left the group in 1929 and established a rival movement in Hong Kong.

In mainland China, Wei's son, Wei Wenxiang (魏文祥, Isaac Wei, 魏以撒, c. 1900–?), emerged as the worker of the TJC. He also presided over TJC's international expansion to various countries and the establishment of an effective bureaucracy.

By 1949, the membership grew to around 120,000 in seven hundred churches. However, as a result of the Chinese Civil war and following regime change, True Jesus Church lost contact with the churches inside China. In 1951, Isaac Wei was arrested and “disappeared.” How and when he died is unknown. Li Zhengcheng (李正誠, ca. 1920–1990) replaced Isaac Wei as the main leader of the TJC and led it into joining the Three-Self Patriotic Movement as the government had requested. Persecution, however, came both before and during the Cultural Revolution, and Li Zhengcheng spent more than twenty years in jail. Because of the developments in China, the TJC abroad proclaimed its autonomy, with headquarters first in Taiwan and from 1985 in the U.S. The Chinese branch was however reconstituted, as part of the Three-Self Church, after the Cultural Revolution and the reforms of Deng Xiaoping and still has a substantial following in China.

Today there are TJC members in more than sixty countries across six continents. According to scholars, the possible total number of members is up to 3 million.

== Current organization ==
=== Mainland China ===
In mainland China, most of the True Jesus Church congregations are members of the Three-Self Patriotic Movement and usually meet on Saturdays in TSPM church buildings as separate sabbatarian sub-congregations. However, since TJC practices such as healing and tongues are "frowned upon" in the TSPM, other congregations are independent Chinese house churches.

=== Taiwan and the United States ===
Outside China, member churches of the TJC look to the central synod of the TJC in California. In 1967, church leaders from outside mainland China met for the first World Delegates Conference in Taiwan, and an international headquarters was established in Taichung, Taiwan, where a seminary was opened. The headquarters was subsequently moved to California in 1985.

=== United Kingdom ===
In the United Kingdom, True Jesus Church congregations were established as a result of immigration patterns in the 1960s and 1970s, coming largely from Malaysia and Hong Kong, the latter especially from Ap Chau. This would result in a number of congregations being established throughout the country, particularly in Northern England and Scotland, such as Leicester, Newcastle, Sunderland, Elgin, Edinburgh and Cardiff.

== Beliefs ==
The church practices baptism via full body immersion for both adults and infants, with holy communion. Speaking in tongues is practiced and usually occurs while in prayer.

The church believes that the sacraments must fulfil three requirements according to the scripture. Firstly, they must have been performed by Jesus Christ himself as an example. Secondly, the sacraments must be directly related to one's salvation, eternal life, entering the Heavenly Kingdom, and having a part with Jesus. Lastly, they must be of the sacraments which Jesus Christ instructed the Disciples to perform as well. There are ten articles of faith that the True Jesus Church holds in order to worship God correctly. According to them, one must speak in tongues as evidence of receiving the Holy Spirit. The mode of baptism also determines salvation. The correct mode should be with the head facing down (in the manner of Jesus' death) and only in natural ("living") water.
