= Nanjing Union Theological Seminary =

Protestant seminary in Nanjing, China, managed by the China Christian Council

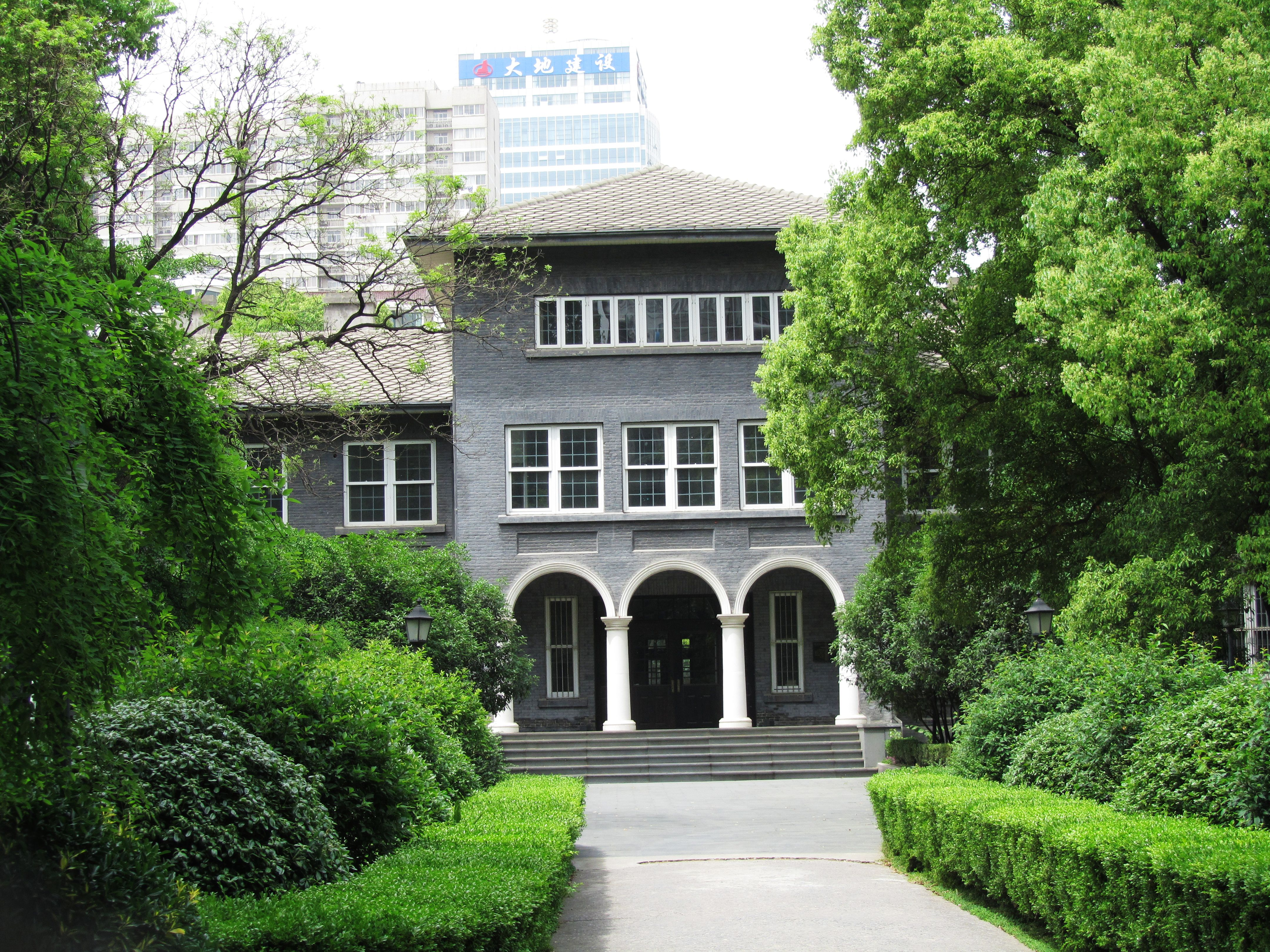
Nanjing Union Theological Seminary

The Nanjing Union Theological Seminary (simplified Chinese: 金陵协和神学院; traditional Chinese: 金陵協和神學院; pinyin: Jīnlíng xiéhé shénxuéyuàn) is the flagship theological seminary of Protestant Christianity in China today. It is managed by the China Christian Council.

Prior to the founding of the People's Republic of China, the institution had its beginnings as Nanking Theological Seminary, established in 1911. In November 1952, ten other theological seminaries in East China would join it to form Nanjing Union Theological Seminary. In 1961, Yanjing Union Theological Seminary of Beijing would likewise join, making a total of twelve seminaries which formed the new seminary.

== Seminary during the Japanese occupation ==
During the massacre in Nanking during December 1937, the pre-consolidated Nanking Theological Seminary housed thousands of Chinese civilians in an effort to offer protection from the Japanese soldiers. However, Christian affiliated schools and seminaries suffered during the Japanese Invasion, and many were unofficially moved into unoccupied areas of Free China.

== During the People's Republic of China ==
In early 1952, the Three-Self Patriotic Movement worked to reform theological education. The PRC government saw Christianity as a potentially subversive power and seminaries lost funds from overseas denominations. Y. T. Wu was at the head of a committee to work towards the union of seminaries in East China. By November 1952, eleven theological seminaries from East China were incorporated as Nanjing Union Theological Seminary:

- Trinity Theological Seminary, Ningbo (寧波三一聖經學院)
- Central Theological Seminary, Shanghai (上海圣公会中央神学院)
- China Theological Seminary, Hangzhou (杭州中國神學院)
- China Baptist Theological Seminary, Shanghai (上海中華浸信會神學院)
- Jiangsu Baptist Bible College, Zhenjiang (鎮江浸信會聖經學院)
- Ming Dao Bible Seminary, Jinan (濟南明道聖經學院)
- Nanking Theological Seminary (南京金陵神學院)
- North China Theological Seminary, Wuxi (無錫華北神學院)
- Minan Theological Seminary, Changzhou (漳州閩南神學院)
- Fujian Union Seminary, Fuzhou (福州福建協和神學院)
- Cheloo Theological Seminary, Jinan (濟南齊魯神學院)

In 1961, a twelfth institution joined the union, Yanjing Union Theological Seminary, Beijing (燕京协和神学院).

In December 1952, K. H. Ting was elected by the board of directors as the new principal. The union brought together a wide theological spectrum of instructors and students.

The seminary has long been the main center for training religious leaders, and was reopened as one of China's primary institutions for religious study in 1981.

Protestantism regained popularity in China during the 1980s, and the Nanjing Union Theological Seminary, which was the only graduate-level seminary at the time, began publishing the journals Nanjing Theological Review and Religion (or Zongjiao), the latter in collaboration with the Nanjing University.

== Historical figures and people associated with the Seminary ==
- Jin Mingri, pastor of Zion Church of Beijing, an independent Christian church in Beijing.
- Francis Wilson Price, American professor at the Seminary who remained at the Seminary throughout Japanese occupation
- John Leighton Stuart, professor of New Testament Literature and Exegesis and an American Missionary who remained in China during Japanese occupation
- Hubert Lafayette Sone, professor of Old Testament and American missionary during the occupation
- K. H. Ting, long-time president of the Seminary and Chinese Christian leader
- Wang Weifan, alumnus and professor of the seminary
- Y. T. Wu, founder of the Three-Self Patriotic Movement
