= Wang Weifan =

Chinese Evangelical theologian

- Native name: Wang Weifan (simplified Chinese: 汪维藩; traditional Chinese: 汪維藩)
- Church: Three-Self Patriotic Movement
- Other posts: Emeritus Professor, Nanjing Union Theological Seminary

Personal details
- Born: 1927 Taizhou, Jiangsu
- Died: 2015 (aged 87–88) Nanjing
- Education: National Central University, Nanjing Union Theological Seminary

Wang Weifan (simplified Chinese: 汪维藩; traditional Chinese: 汪維藩; pinyin: Wāng Wéifān; 1927–2015) was an evangelical Christian leader of the state-sanctioned Protestant church of mainland China, the Three-Self Patriotic Movement. He was well-loved as a preacher, theologian, and devotional writer.

== Biography ==
Wang Weifan was born into a non-Christian home in Taizhou, Jiangsu province. He became a Christian in 1947 while studying Chinese literature at National Central University in Nanjing and became active in InterVarsity Christian Fellowship. Wang would go onto further studies in China Theological Seminary in Hangzhou (Chinese: 杭州中国神学院; pinyin: Hángzhōu Zhōngguó shénxuéyuàn), which would later merge with Nanjing Union Theological Seminary (Chinese: 金陵协和神学院; pinyin: Jīnlíng xiéhé shénxuéyuàn) in 1952. He would graduate from Nanjing Union Theological Seminary three years later in 1955.

Wang would be criticized during the Anti-Rightist Movement in 1958 and, later, during the Cultural Revolution.

After public religious practice was allowed again in China following the end of the Cultural Revolution, Wang taught the New Testament at the Nanjing Union Theological Seminary and was the head of the publications department.

Wang Weifan died on September 15, 2015, in Nanjing.

== Theology ==
Wang Weifan's theological thinking brought together Chinese classical thought and traditional western theology. Borrowing from the Yijing, he was known for his idea of the "ever-generating God" (Chinese: 生生神; pinyin: shēng shēng shén):

The central theological idea focuses on the word sheng ("life"). God is understood as a God of sheng sheng, "a Life-Birthing God" – the first sheng is used as a verb ("to give birth to") and the second as a noun ("life"). The unceasing generating God is a living and dynamic God who does not only give birth to life, but also sustains and protects it.

Like other leaders of the Three-Self Patriotic Movement such as K. H. Ting, Wang also spoke of a cosmic Christology, with a strong emphasis on the Incarnation, and held to a Christocentric mysticism.

Due to his evangelical theology, Wang Weifan would in the 1990s be pushed into retirement during the "theological reconstruction movement" by his friend and colleague K. H. Ting.

== Works ==
- Wang, Weifan (1993). Lilies of the Field: Meditations for the Church Year. Nashville, TN: The Upper Room.
- Wang, Weifan (1997). Zhongguo shenxue ji qi wenhua yuanyuan [Chinese Theology and its Cultural Origins] (in Chinese). Nanjing: Nanjing Theological Seminary.
- Wang, Weifan (2009). Shi nian ju ju: Wang Weifan wenji (1997– 2007) [Walking Lonely for Ten Years: Selected Works of Wang Weifan (1997–2007)] (in Chinese). Hong Kong: Christian Study Centre on Chinese Religion and Culture.
- Wang, Weifan (2011). Nian zai cang mang: Wang Weifan wenji (1979–1998) [In the Wilderness for Two Decades: Selected Works of Wang Weifan (1979–1998)] (in Chinese). Hong Kong: Christian Study Centre on Chinese Religion and Culture.
