= Nanjing Theological Review =

- Discipline: Religious Studies
- Language: Chinese

Publication details
- History: 1914–1927, Theological Review; 1932–1942 & 1947–1950, Nanking Theological Review; 1953–1957 & 1984–1985, Nanking Union Theological Review; 1986–present Nanjing Theological Review
- Publisher: Nanjing Union Theological Seminary (China)

Standard abbreviations
- ISO 4: Nanjing Theol. Rev.

Indexing
- ISSN: 1562-4129
- OCLC no.: 45576781

Nanjing Theological Review
- Traditional Chinese: 金陵神學志
- Simplified Chinese: 金陵神学志
Transcriptions
Standard Mandarin
- Hanyu Pinyin: Jīnlíng shénxué zhì

Nanjing Theological Review (simplified Chinese: 金陵神学志; traditional Chinese: 金陵神學志; pinyin: Jīnlíng shénxué zhì) is a Chinese-language journal of Protestantism in China. Originally established in 1914, it is currently published by the Nanjing Union Theological Seminary.

== History ==
The journal was originally founded in 1914 by the Presbyterian Chen Chin-yung (Chinese: 陈金镛; pinyin: Chen Jinyong; 1869–1938), a Professor of New Testament Language and Literature at Nanking Theological Seminary, as the Theological Review. The journal's publication was interrupted and renamed several times, taking on the name the Nanking Union Theological Review in 1953 when it was published by the Nanjing Union Theological Seminary. It was renamed again in 1986 to its current name of Nanjing Theological Review.

Since 1985, the Nanjing Theological Review and the English-language Chinese Theological Review have been supported by the Foundation for Theological Education in Southeast Asia. Many of the articles from the Nanjing Theological Review are translated into English in the Chinese Theological Review.
