= Hubert Lafayette Sone =

American Methodist missionary in China

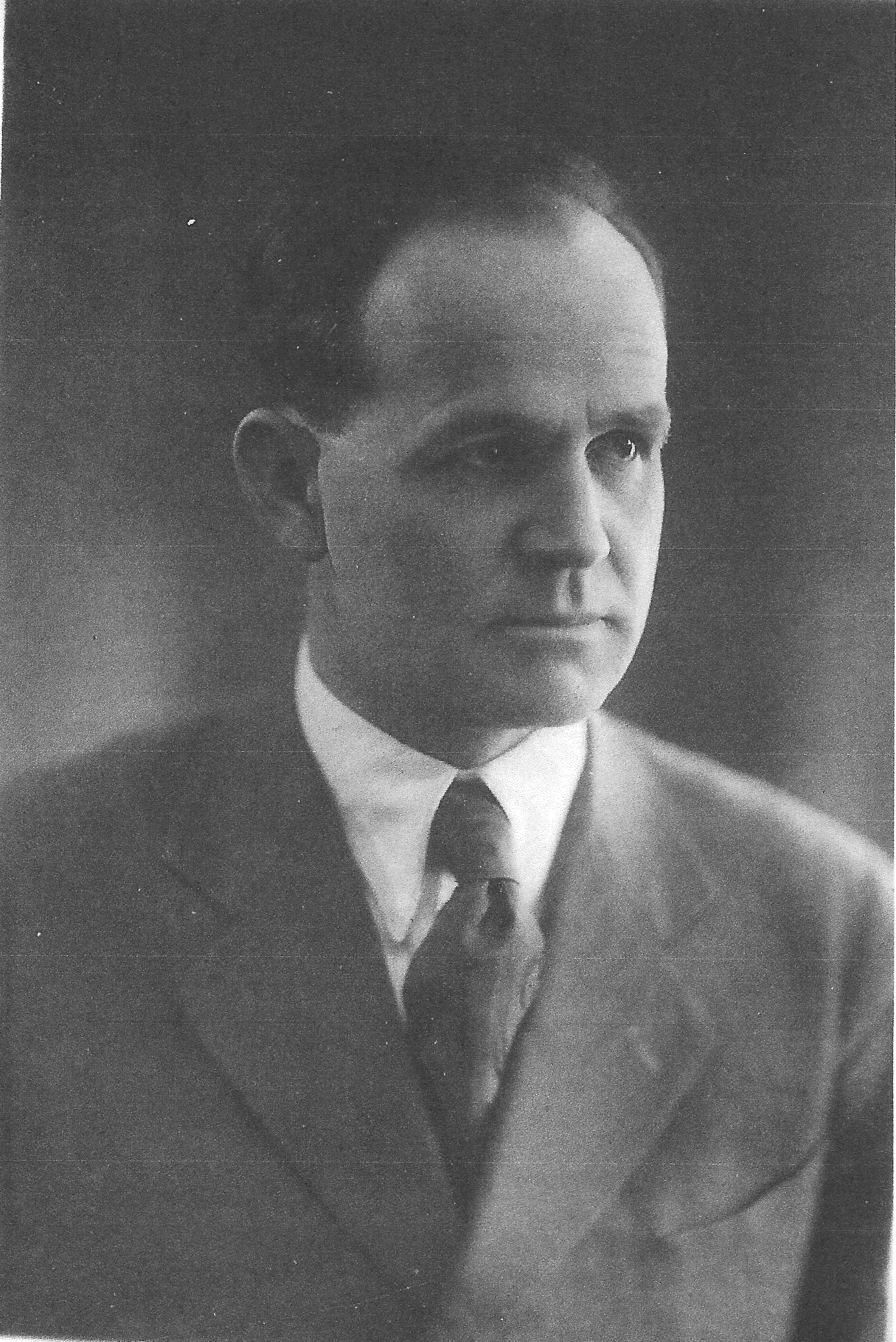
- Sone circa 1937
- Born: Hubert Lafayette Sone; June 7, 1892; Denton, Texas, U.S.
- Died: September 8, 1970 (aged 78); Fort Worth, Texas, U.S.
- Education: B.A., B.D., M.A., Southern Methodist University
- Occupation: Christian Missionary
- Years active: 1918–1961
- Spouse: Katie Helen Jackson Sone
- Children: Charles Forrest, Margaret Ruth
- Parent(s): J.W. and Martha Sone
- Religion: Methodist
- Church: Methodist Episcopal Church (South)
- Ordained: 1916
- Offices held: Faculty, Nanking Theological Seminary; Assoc. Food Cmnsr., Nanking Safety Zone; Dir., Nanjing International Relief Committee; President, Union Trinity Theological Seminary
- Title: Reverend

Hubert Lafayette Sone (June 7, 1892 – September 8, 1970), also known as Soong (or Sung) Hsu-Peh (Chinese: 宋煦伯) in Chinese, was an American Methodist missionary in China. He was a professor of Old Testament at Nanjing Theological Seminary during the Japanese invasion in 1937. Sone was among the small group of foreigners who remained in the city and provided aid to the Chinese victims of the Japanese atrocities. He served with John Rabe on the International Committee for the Nanking Safety Zone and was Associate Food Commissioner. On 18 February 1938 the name of the committee was changed to the "Nanjing International Relief Committee." After the departure of George Fitch, Sone was elected Director of the Nanjing International Relief Committee. For their actions in support of the Chinese people, Sone and thirteen other Americans were awarded "The Order of the Blue Jade" by the Chinese government.

== Early life and education ==
Hubert Lafayette Sone was born in Denton, Texas, in the United States, on 7 June 1892, to J. William and Martha Anne Ballew Sone.

In 1915 Sone was among the seven hundred students admitted to the inaugural class of Southern Methodist University (SMU) in Dallas, Texas, and he received a Bachelor of Arts from SMU in 1916. After serving in the U.S. Army, Sone was licensed to preach by the Methodist Episcopal Church South District Conference on 7 May 1918. He applied to the Board of Missions of the Methodist Episcopal Church South, for an assignment as a missionary to China. He married Katie Helen Jackson in Chillicothe, Texas on 15 June 1918.

== China ==
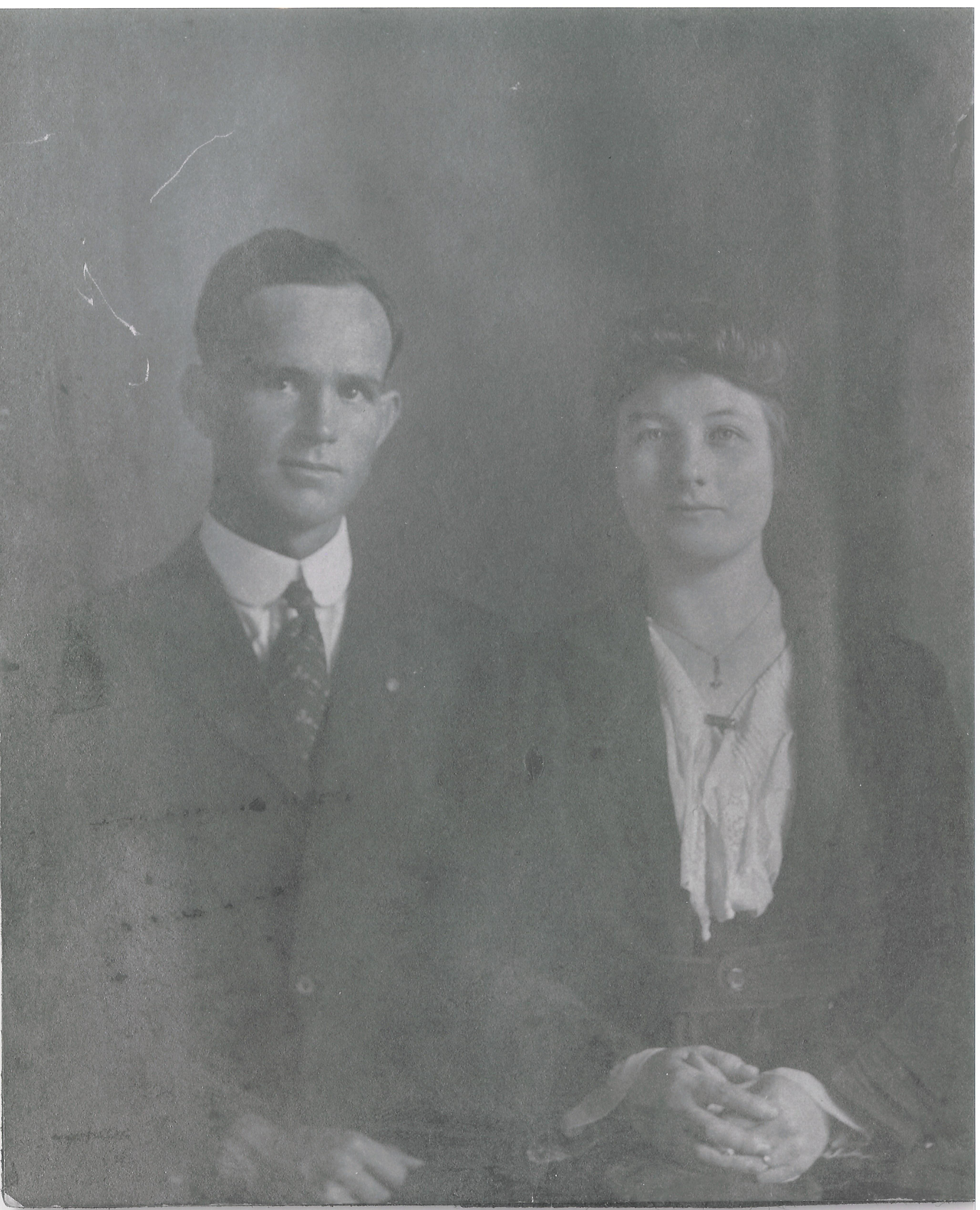
Hubert and Helen Sone c. 1925

The Sones departed the United States in April 1920 for the mission field in China. They arrived in Shanghai to begin their new life of ministry and teaching in China in May 1920.

The Methodist Episcopal Church South mission in China was opened in Shanghai in the late 1840s. The field of endeavor included the southern end of Jiangsu and the northern end of Zhejiang Provinces, one of the most densely populated regions in China.

Sone studied Chinese at Soochow University in Suzhou and was assigned to Huzhou to build a Methodist Mission station. In 1921 he traveled to Dezhou in Shandong Province to do famine relief work, driving a rice truck from village to village.

The Sones went back to the United States in. He received a Bachelor of Divinity (B.D.) and a Master of Arts degree (M.A.) in 1926 and in 1927 both from Southern Methodist University. In 1928, Sone was made Superintendent of the Institutional Church in Huzhou. In 1933, he was appointed Sone to the faculty of the Nanking Theological Seminary, today known as the Nanjing Union Theological Seminary upon his return to China. In the summer of 1934 the Sones returned to Huzhou, China.

After leaving Huzhou and moving to Nanjing, Sone taught Mandarin, English, and Hebrew at the seminary while his wife taught first and second grade in the Nanjing American School.

== Japanese occupation and war crimes ==
The Second Sino-Japanese War began in July 1937 after several incidents in northern China. Air raids by the Imperial Japanese Army (IJA) began in Nanjing on 15 August 1937, and school started at Nanjing Theological Seminary on 30 September 1937. The residents, students and faculty of Nanjing Theological Seminary went to air raid shelters when the warnings sounded. In November 1937 the Imperial Japanese Army captured the port city of Shanghai and Sone sent his wife and children to Mount Mogan, while he remained in Nanjing. Sone attended a meeting at the U.S. Embassy:

At 10 A.M was at a conference over at Embassy. Others present, Sone of Seminary; Fitch, Y.M.C.A.; Bates of University, and Trimmer of Hospital. Mr. Paxton spoke of possibility of looting soldiers and the danger to foreigners. Said that as many as possible should leave at once, and those who cannot leave immediately should be prepared to go out when and if Embassy leaves for U.S.S. Panay. If city gates are closed two places were designated as points for going down over city wall by ropes. Each person was then asked to report for himself and group. Searl (M.S. Bates) and I feel that our responsibilities make it necessary to stay through. Our explanations were accepted and respected....

On 9 December 1937, Japanese troops launched the attack upon the city of Nanjing. For safety a group of missionaries, including Sone, left their homes and moved into the Pearl Buck home. The USS Panay was escorting U.S. residents out of the city when it was sunk by the Japanese on 12 December. The Sone family assumed Hubert Sone was on that ship evacuating with the other Americans. However, Sone had decided to stay in Nanjing and was one of the fourteen Americans who remained in Nanjing and witnessed the Japanese war crimes.

By 13 December 1937 the Japanese troops entered the city and began what is known as the Nanjing Massacre. Historians generally agree that as many as 300,000 civilian Chinese were shot, bayoneted, and burned. As many as 20,000 innocent women, young and old, even children, were raped, and mutilated. Sone was one of twenty-seven Western nationals in Nanjing who experienced its fall and witnessed the ensuing massacre. In a letter to Professor P.F. Price, Sone described what was happening in Nanjing:

There has been nothing or no one safe. Soldiers have taken anything they wanted, destroyed what they did not want, raped women and girls openly and publicly by the scores and hundreds. Those who opposed them were bayoneted or shot on the spot. Women who have opposed being raped, have been bayoneted. Children who have interfered have also been bayoneted. One woman who was being raped on Frank's place—there have been about 150 people staying at his house—had her four or five months old baby near her, and it cried, so the soldier raping her smothered it to death. One refugee girl in the B.T.T.S. was raped 17 times. Finally we got Japanese guards stationed at the gates of the larger compounds, but they often themselves go in and rape women. Every day and night brings forth repeated cases. These cases have occurred by the hundreds—they make a tale of horror almost indescribable.

In a letter to Rev. Marshal T. Steel, Pastor of Highland Park Methodist Church, today Highland Park United Methodist Church, in Dallas, Texas, US, on 14 March 1938 Sone said:

The Japanese soldiers came into the city in quite large numbers on Monday Dec. 13th. Many civilians were killed on the spot—shot or bayoneted. Everyone who ran, and many were frightened on the first appearance of the troops, was immediately shot. On the afternoon of Monday I went down the street on my bike, and saw many dead and dying along the road. I sent a number of them to the hospital in the ambulance.

In a letter to his missionary colleague, Dr. A.W. Wasson, Sone related:

They shot and bayoneted on the spot and without question anyone whom they might consider to be a soldier. As a result, great numbers of people were shot down, even though in civilian clothes ... The streets were literally littered with the dead. The next few days—in fact two weeks or more, and even until the present, the military have been busily engaged in weeding out all the Chinese soldiers. These have been taken in groups of tens, fifties, hundred, and several hundreds at a time, and machine gunned and bayoneted en masse. Many of them were thus dispatched on the bank of the Yangtse River, and their bodies tumbled into the river to be carried off by the rushing waters. Others were burned in heaps. Some of them tumbled into pits.

Minnie Vautrin, a professor at Ginling College, and later described as "the Living Goddess of Mercy" for her role defending the Chinese, picked Sone up in her vehicle after the Japanese had stolen Sone's car.

A little past Hillcrest saw Mr. Sone on road and took him into the car. Said his car had just been taken—he had left it out in front of his house when he went in for a few minutes. There was an American Flag on it and it was locked.

Physical violence against foreigners was also not uncommon. On 23 December, around 5 p.m., two Japanese soldiers approached a residence belonging to the Nanjing Theological Seminary, an American institution. As they began to occupy the property by force the soldiers struck and manhandled Hubert Sone, who was a member of the faculty and Chair of the Property Committee of the seminary. Sone reported this incident to the Japanese Embassy:

I wish to report that on yesterday afternoon, December 23rd, about 5:00 o'clock, two Japanese soldiers entered the premises of No. 2 Shanghai Road, took down the American flag and hoisted a banner stating that this house is to be the residence of the Investigating Committee.

This house at No. 2 Shanghai Road is American property. It is the residence of Prof. R. A. Felton of the Nanking Theological Seminary, and also has stored in it the household and personal effect of Prof. C. S. Smith, and Prof. Edward James, both of our Seminary.

The proclamation placed on the front gate by the Japanese Embassy was removed just a few minutes before I found these soldiers taking down the American flag. The American Embassy proclamation was still displayed in a prominent place. One of the soldiers was obviously drunk. They insisted that they wanted to borrow the place for ten days, which I declined to grant. They then became very angry and rough with me, shouting and striking me on the shoulder, and finally by force took hold of me and dragged me across the yard and out into the middle of Shanghai Road. It was only after I agreed to sign a statement allowing them to borrow the house for two weeks that they would release me. After signing this statement, they released me, and allowed us to raise again the American flag. But they put their banner on the front gate and said they would return today at 9:00 o'clock and occupy the house. They ordered the Chinese refugees who are living in the house at present to move out completely.

=== Establishment of the Nanjing Safety Zone ===
A "safety zone" had been implemented in Shanghai by a French, Catholic Priest, Father Robert Jacquinot de Besange, in August 1937. It was a successful model and the Nanking Safety Zone (南京安全区) began organizational efforts in November 1937.

On 22 November 1937, trusting their privileged status as third-party nationals, those remaining foreigners voluntarily organized a committee called the "International Committee for the Nanking Safety Zone" to provide Chinese people with refuge and relief. They elected a German businessman of Siemens China Corporation, John Rabe, as its chair presumably for not only his character, but also his status as a Nazi. Japan and Germany had signed the bilateral Anti-Comintern Pact in 1936.

The Nanjing Safety Zone was established in the western district of the city. It was composed of a score of refugee camps that occupied an area of about 3.4 square miles (8.6 square kilometers). On 1 December 1937, Mayor Ma Chaochun of Nanjing met the International Committee and authorized them to take over the city administration once he and his staff were evacuated. Unlike Shanghai, the Japanese never gave assurance that the Nanjing Safety Zone would not either be attacked. In spite of this the International Committee issued "an open letter to the residents of Nanjing on Dec. 8, 1937." Residents of Nanjing began streaming into the safety zone and ultimately "over ninety percent of the city's population crowded into it."

Sone was Chairman of the Property Committee of the Nanjing Theological Seminary. He also was Associate Food Commissioner of the International Committee for the Nanjing Safety Zone. He delivered rice to the refugee camps, driving the rice truck personally. To a missionary colleague Sone wrote of the looting, rape, murder, burning and destruction caused by the Japanese.

With the coming of the Japanese soldiers we thought order would soon be restored, and peace would come, and people would be able to return to their homes and get back to normal life again. But the surprise of surprises came to us all. Robbery, looting, torture, murder, rape, burning—everything that can be imagined was carried out from the very beginning without any limit. Modern times have nothing to surpass it. Nanking has been almost a living hell.

Sone attempted to prevent assaults on Chinese civilians and was beaten by the Japanese soldiers. He filed protest letters with the Japanese embassy in Nanjing, the United States Embassy and tried to alert the outside world through correspondence with colleagues in the United States. On 18 February the official name of the International Committee for the Nanjing Safety Zone was changed to the "Nanjing International Relief Committee." After George Fitch departed, Sone was elected Administrative Director of the Nanjing International Relief Committee. During the attack on Nanjing, Sone's family, Helen, and the two children remained on Moganshan.

=== Order of the Blue Jade ===
In 1939 the Chinese government awarded Sone and thirteen other Americans, one of China's highest civilian awards for valor, the Order of the Blue Jade for their humanitarian efforts, sometimes referred to as the Star of the Jade Order, or Emblem of the Blue Jade. Sone's award came in a black lacquer box with red silk lining inside. The box was personalized with the Chinese character for Sung (Sone).

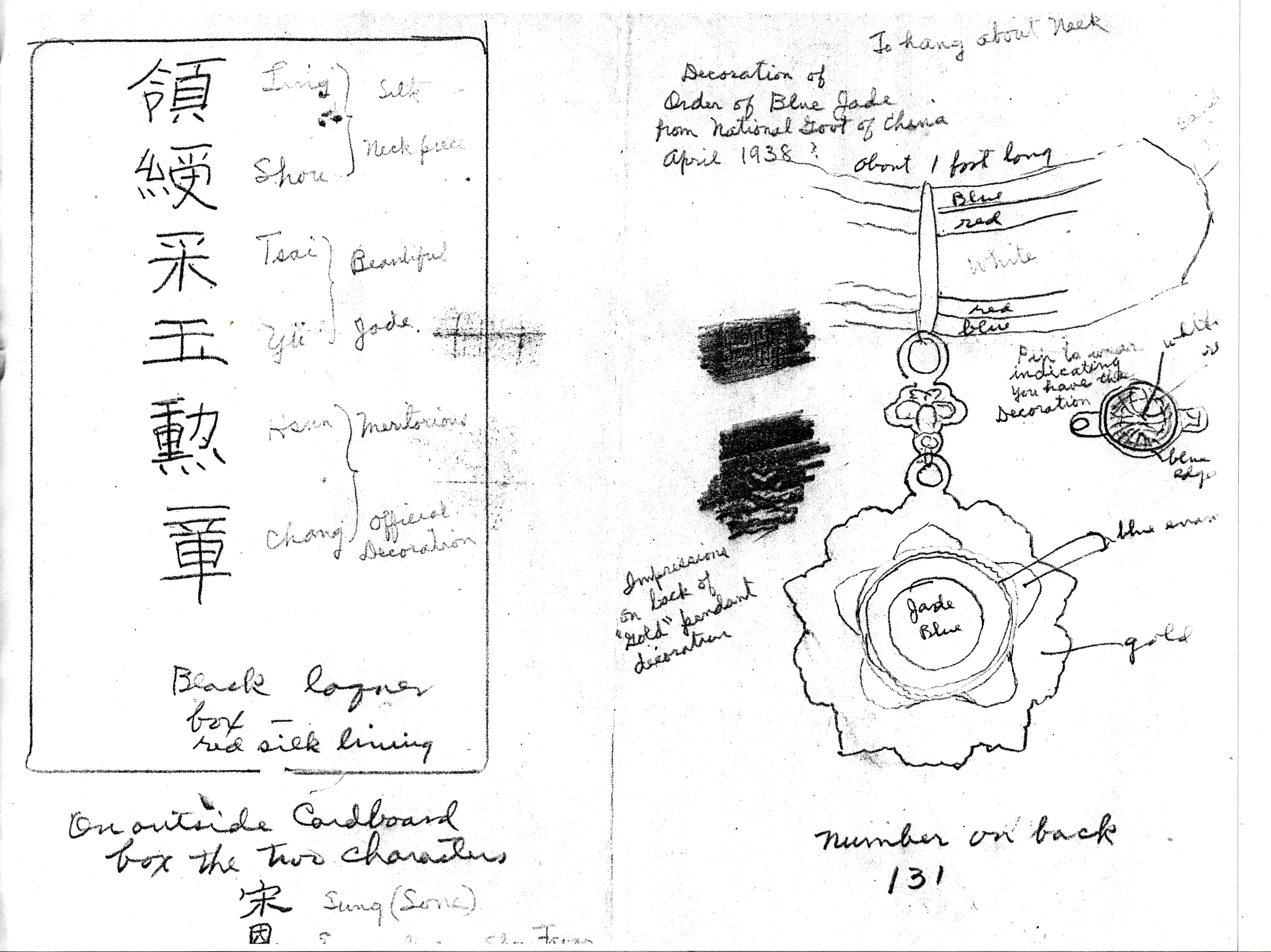
New medal scan; HLS

Before Sone left China in 1951, he disposed of the award in Nanjing. In a letter to his parents he described the medal and how he discarded it to avoid any further difficulty leaving China. However, he drew a picture of the medal, the lapel pin, and box in which it was presented and mailed this in a letter to his parents in the United States.

=== Return to Nanjing and relief work ===
From 1938 to 1941 he returned to teaching and was also director of the Nanjing International Relief Committee, formerly the International Committee for the Nanking Safety Zone.

== Return to the United States and WW II ==
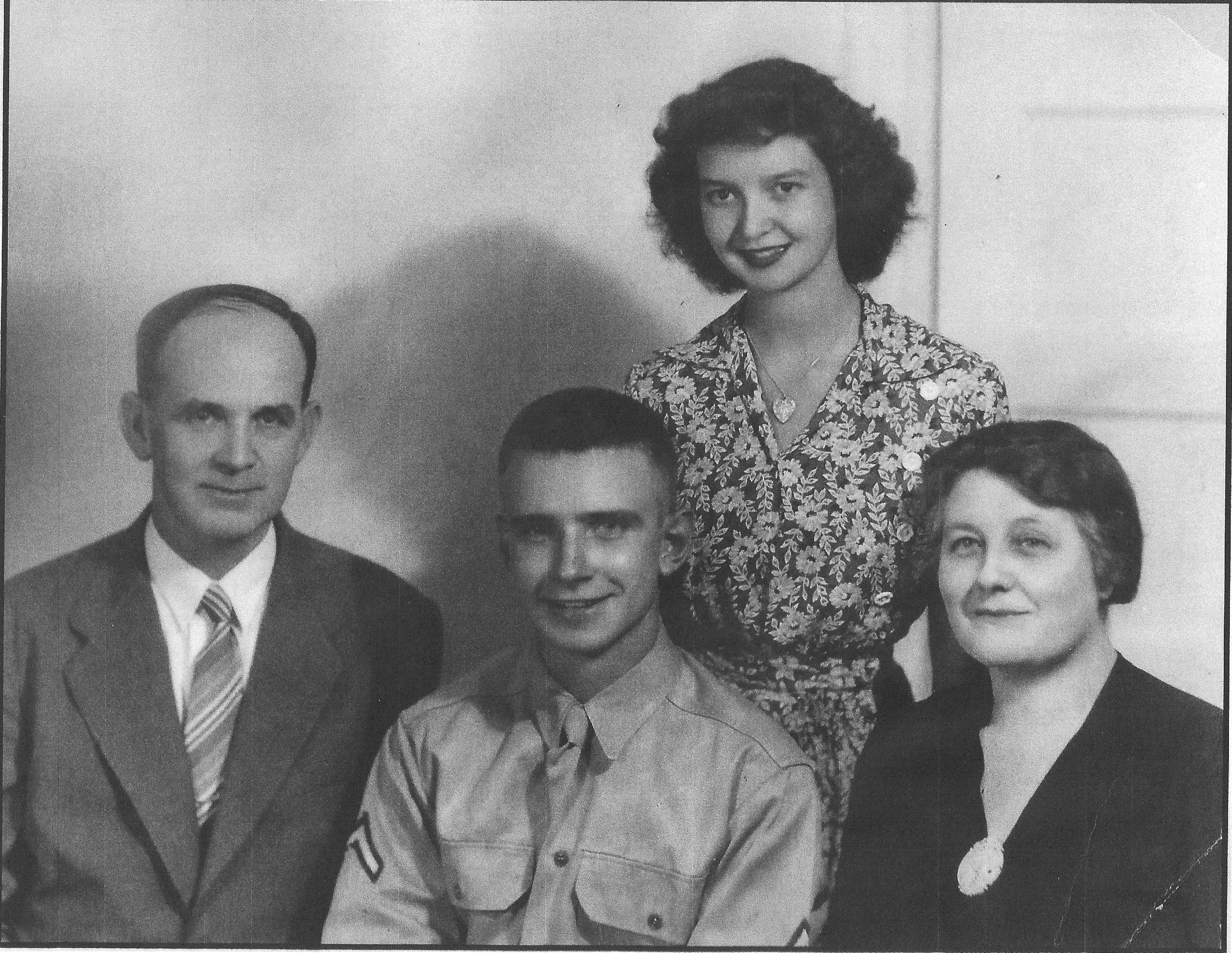
Sone family, c. 1944

On 3 May 1941, Sone sailed on the "President Pierce" steamer for a furlough in the United States, arriving on 21 May 1941. The Sone family settled in Chicago where he enrolled in a doctoral program at The University of Chicago. The United States entry into World War II on 7 December 1941 indefinitely postponed his return to China.

== Return to China ==
In 1946, after World War II had ended, the Sones returned to their old home in Nanjing and resumed teaching, relief work, preaching in the churches, and music lessons taught by Helen Sone. Hubert Sone led an effort in 1948 to feed 15,000 refugees in Nanjing.

=== Leaving China for the last time ===
On 1 October 1949, Mao Zedong declared the start of the People's Republic of China (PRC). The United States then suspended diplomatic ties, for decades. In 1950, the United States recalled its ambassador and urged United States citizens to leave China. On 25 June 1950, the struggle between North and South Korea became an international conflict with the adoption of the United Nations Security Council Resolution 83 and the entry of the United States into the Korean War. On 2 December 1950, Sone requested an exit visa from the People's Republic of China (PRC). The Chinese government required departing foreigners to advertise in the paper for three days in the event there was an outstanding issue someone wished to bring. While others were granted visas, the Sones' visa was delayed and he was informed that his request was sent to Beijing for consideration. In April, 1951 the Sones were allowed to leave after much of their personal effects were confiscated, including all United States currency, his field glasses and radio with a comment that it could be used to send signals. On 12 April the Sones arrived in Hong Kong, the last American missionaries to leave Nanjing. On their fourth furlough, they departed Hong Kong on 8 May 1951 for San Francisco on board the SS "President Wilson", never to return to China.

== Singapore ==
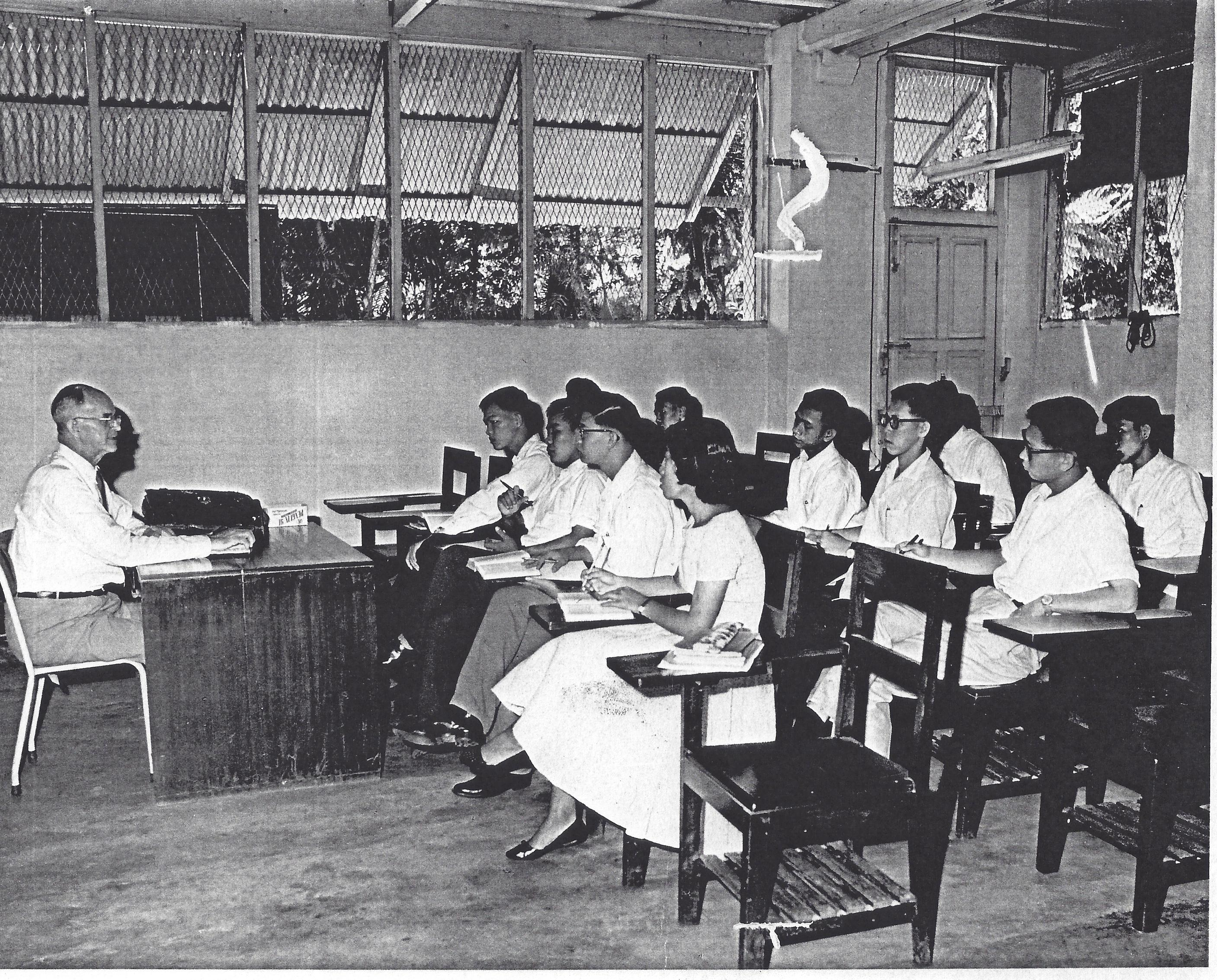
Dr. H.L. Sone teaching a class at Trinity College, Singapore, Malaya

After being in the US for a little over a year, the Sones went to Trinity College, today known as Trinity Theological College, in Singapore, Malaya for the next nine years. Today the institution is known as Trinity Theological College (TTC).

Sone was a faculty member, Dean, then Principal of Trinity Theological College. He also preached at local churches, and served as Secretary of the Trustees of the Methodist Church in Malaysia.

== Retirement and death ==
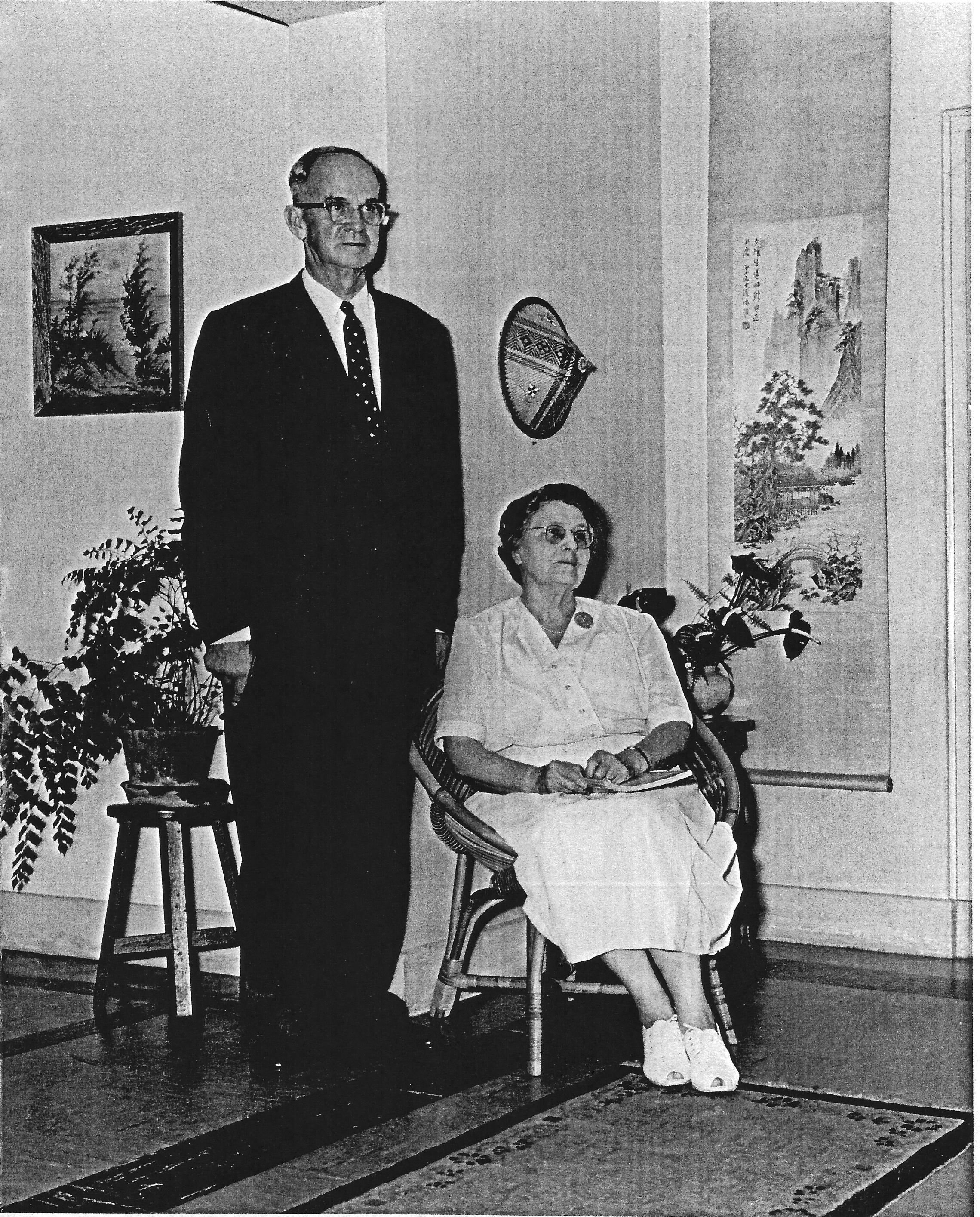
Hubert & Helen Sone in Singapore

In 1961, the Sones returned to Texas, USA and retired from active mission work after forty one years of service. For the next nine years Sone preached at area churches and travelled widely, lecturing on the work of the Methodist Church in Asia.

Sone died in Fort Worth, Texas, USA on 6 September 1970 at age 78.

== Bibliography ==
- A Century of Protestant Missions in China (1807–1907) Edited by Donald MacGillivray, Printed at the American Presbyterian Mission Press, Shanghai, 1907
- China Mission Year Book, Edited by the National Christian Council, Editor, Henry T. Hodgkin, M.D., Shanghai, Christian Literature Society
- They Were in Nanjing-The Nanjing Massacre Witnessed by American and British Nationals, by Suping Lu, Hong Kong University Press, 2004
- Terror in Minnie Vautrin's Nanjing-Dairies and Correspondence, 1937-38-Minnie Vautrin Edited and with an Introduction by Suping Lu, University of Illinois Press, Urbana and Chicago, 2008.
- Chang, Iris, The Rape of Nanking: The Forgotten Holocaust of World War II, Foreword by William C. Kirby; Penguin USA (Paper), 1998. ISBN 0-14-027744-7
