= Matthew Fox (priest) =

American priest and theologian (born 1940)

The Reverend Matthew Fox
- Church: Episcopal Church (United States)
- Province: Province VIII
- Diocese: Diocese of California
- In office: April 1994

Personal details
- Born: Timothy James Fox; December 21, 1940 (age 85) Madison, Wisconsin, United States
- Denomination: Catholic; Anglican
- Residence: Berkeley, California, United States
- Occupation: Priest; theologian; author
- Education: Aquinas Institute of Theology; Institut Catholique de Paris

Timothy James "Matthew" Fox (born December 21, 1940) is an American priest and theologian. Formerly a member of the Dominican Order within the Catholic Church, he became a priest in the Episcopal Church following his expulsion from the order in 1993.

Fox has written 35 books that have been translated into 68 languages and have sold millions of copies and by the mid-1990s had attracted a "huge and diverse following".

== Life ==
=== Dominican friar ===
Timothy James Fox was born in Madison, Wisconsin. In 1959, when he entered the Catholic Dominican Order (the Order of Preachers), he was given the religious name "Matthew". He received masters degrees in both philosophy and theology from the Aquinas Institute of Philosophy and Theology and later earned a Doctorate of Spiritual Theology, summa cum laude, from the Institut Catholique de Paris, studying with Marie-Dominique Chenu who named the Creation Spirituality tradition for him. It was Thomas Merton, the Catholic monk, who steered Fox to study at the Institut Catholique de Paris. After receiving his doctorate, Fox began teaching at a series of Catholic universities, including Loyola University in Chicago and Barat College of the Sacred Heart in Lake Forest, Illinois.

In 1976, Fox moved to Chicago's Mundelein College (now part of Loyola University) to start the Institute of Culture and Creation Spirituality (ICCS), a master's program in Creation Spirituality with a unique pedagogy that integrated both left and right brain centers and would eventually lead to conflict with Church authorities. His holistic pedagogy included among its faculty Jungian psychologist John Giannini, physicist/cosmologist Brian Swimme, feminist theologian Rosemary Radford Ruether, along with many artists teaching "art as meditation." In 1983, Fox moved ICCS to Oakland, California, and began teaching at Holy Names University, where he was a professor for 12 years.

In 1984 Cardinal Joseph Ratzinger — the future Pope Benedict XVI, then head of the Congregation for the Doctrine of the Faith — asked the Dominican Order to investigate Fox's writings. When three Dominican theologians examined his works and did not find his books heretical, Ratzinger ordered a second review, which was never undertaken.

Due to Fox's questioning of the doctrine of original sin, in 1988 Ratzinger forbade him from teaching or lecturing for a year. Fox wrote a "Pastoral Letter to Cardinal Ratzinger and the Whole Church," calling the Catholic Church a dysfunctional family. After a year "sabbatical," Fox resumed writing, teaching, and lecturing. In 1991, Fox's Dominican superior ordered him to leave the ICCS in California and return to Chicago or face dismissal. Fox refused.

On March 31, 1991, Fox made an extended appearance on the British television discussion program After Dark, alongside Piltdown Man debunker Teddy Hall; secular humanist activist Barbara Smoker; theologian N. T. Wright; playwright Hyam Maccoby (who theorized that Jesus was an apocalyptic Jew and Messianic claimant); author Ian Wilson (known chiefly for speculative writing on the Shroud of Turin); and others. In 1993, Fox's conflicts with Catholic authorities climaxed with his expulsion from the Dominican Order for "disobedience", effectively ending his professional relationship with the Church and his teaching at its universities.

Among the issues Ratzinger objected to were his feminist theology; calling God "Mother"; preferring the concept of Original Blessing over Original Sin; not condemning homosexual behavior; and teaching the four paths of creation spirituality – the Via Positiva, Via Negativa, Via Creativa, and Via Transformativa — instead of the church's classical three paths of purgation, illumination and union.

Writing in The New York Times, Molly O'Neill said that the Vatican was presented with a request on the part of the Dominicans that the theologian be dismissed. According to John L. Allen Jr., it was largely in reaction to the unconventional programming at ICCS, with a faculty that included a masseuse, a Zen Buddhist, a yoga teacher, and Starhawk, a feminist Wiccan.

=== Episcopal priest ===
After his expulsion, Fox met young Anglican activists in England who were using "raves" as a way to bring life back to their liturgy and to attract young people to church worship. He was inspired to begin holding his own series of "Techno Cosmic Masses" in Oakland and other U.S. cities, events designed to connect people to a more ecstatic and visceral celebration and relationship with ritual and the building of community.

Fox was received into the Episcopal Church (Anglican Communion) as a priest in 1994 by Bishop William Swing of the Episcopal Diocese of California.

In 1996, Fox founded the University of Creation Spirituality in Oakland, an outgrowth of his institutes at Mundelein and Holy Names. The university offered similar master's degree programs in creation spirituality and related studies. It was initially accredited through an affiliation with New College of California, before shifting in 1999 to affiliate with the Naropa Institute of Boulder, Colorado, creating and running Naropa's master's degree program. The university also added a separate doctorate of ministry degree, with a curriculum based on his 1993 book The Reinvention of Work: A New Vision of Livelihood for Our Time, which talked about a "priesthood of all workers".

Fox led the University of Creation Spirituality for nine years, then was succeeded as president by James Garrison in 2005. The institution was subsequently renamed Wisdom University.

Since leaving the university, Fox has continued to lecture, write and publish books. In 2005, he founded an educational organization geared to reach out to inner-city youth called Youth and Elder Learning Laboratory for Ancestral Wisdom Education (YELLAWE). The YELLAWE program is based on a holistic approach to education and creativity derived from Fox’s master’s level programs. It also includes physical training in bodily meditation practices such as tai chi. YELLAWE has operated in inner-city school systems in Oakland and Chicago.

Fox's proponents hold that his teachings are more gender-neutral, ecology sensitive, and accepting of non-traditional sexuality, than church orthodoxy.

== Creation Spirituality ==
While some academic theologians refer to Fox as the next Pierre Teilhard de Chardin, others call him a populizer, not an intellectual. Robert Brow characterizes the teachings as "esoteric excursions into ethics, theology, and mysticism".

=== Basic tenets ===
Fox's conception of Creation Spirituality draws on both a close reading of biblical sources and early medieval mystics within Christian traditions as well as today's science. It seeks common ground with numerous faiths from around the world, in an approach Fox called "deep ecumenism" for its connections across many spiritual practices. This was described most particularly in his book One River, Many Wells: Wisdom Springing from Global Faiths.

Creation Spirituality considers itself a “green” theology, emphasizing a holy relationship between humanity and nature. Accordingly, the sacredness of nature is considered a sacrament, and creation is considered an expression of God and the “Cosmic Christ". This approach was endorsed by eco-theologian Thomas Berry among others. Fox's book The Coming of the Cosmic Christ: The Healing of Mother Earth and the Birth of a Global Renaissance delves more into these issues.

Fox also laid out other tenets of Creation Spirituality in some of his other books, particularly Original Blessing, A Spirituality Named Compassion, and Creation Spirituality: Liberating Gifts for the People of the Earth.

Fox’s 1996 autobiography, Confessions: The Making of a Post-Denominational Priest, describes his life as a Dominican priest and his struggle with the Vatican as he wrote about his experiences and understanding of early Christianity. This book was updated and published by North Atlantic Books in 2016.

Fox also has authored or edited nearly 35 other books, largely on various spiritual teachings, teachers, and mystics (listed below). He was the first to translate Meister Eckhart into English from the critical German editions along with a commentary on his work and helped to launch the Hildegard of Bingen revival. His book on the mysticism of Thomas Aquinas translates many of his works that have never before been translated into English, German or French.

Fox's theological positions have been categorized as a type of monism, specifically panentheism. Some have claimed this approach is integral to Fox's creation spirituality.

Fox's theology has received plaudits from noted spiritual figures including Dom Bede Griffiths, OSB, who said: "“(Matthew Fox’s) creation spirituality is the spirituality of the future and his Theology of the Cosmic Christ is the theology of the future." (Note: Excerpt from audio tape, “Spirituality for a New Era: Dialog with Matthew Fox and Bede Griffiths,” September 1992, Holy Names College, Oakland, California) About the 25th-anniversary edition of Original Blessing, John B. Cobb, professor emeritus at the Claremont School of Theology, wrote: "Fox's accomplishment in Original Blessing was more than to recover a form of spirituality that had been obscured and to show its profound relevance and importance for our time. He used spirituality as an avenue into the depths of Christian faith and theology in general...Gradually the book is assuming the status of a classic. In due course, it will take its place in the history of spirituality and indeed in the history of theology." (Note: Cobb, John, quoted in " Original Blessing, Matthew Fox (2000))

=== Techno Cosmic Mass ===
Fox's "Techno Cosmic Mass" (more recently called "Cosmic Mass") is an attempt to combine the religious ritual of the Eucharist with dance and multimedia material, deejays, video jockeys, and rap music. They evoke and connect spiritual rituals and the ecstatic energy of techno and rave parties. They developed from a group called the Nine O'Clock Service in Sheffield, England, in the late 1980s and early 1990s and were brought to the United States and further developed by Fox. Over 100 Cosmic Masses have been celebrated in North America and numerous persons have studied how to present them.

=== 95 theses ===
In 2005, while preparing for a presentation in Germany and following the election of Ratzinger as Pope Benedict XVI, Fox created 95 theses that he then translated into German. On the weekend of Pentecost, arrangements were made for him to nail these to the door of the Wittenberg church where Martin Luther nailed the original 95 Theses in the 16th century, an act often associated with the Protestant Reformation.

The action fueled the creation of a lively blog involving tens of thousands of Germans. In his theses, Fox called for a new reformation in Western Christianity. In his supporting book, A New Reformation, Fox argued that two Christianities already exist and it is time for a new reformation to acknowledge that fact and move the Western spiritual tradition into new directions.

== Books ==
- Religion USA: Religion and Culture by way of TIME Magazine (1971), Listening Press, OCLC 489983768
- On Becoming a Musical, Mystical Bear: Spirituality American Style (1972), Harper & Row, ISBN 0-06-062912-6, (1976) Paulist Press, paperback: ISBN 0-8091-1913-7 Republished as Prayer: A Radical Response to Life (2001), Tarcher/Putnam, ISBN 1-58542-098-0
- Western Spirituality: Historical Roots, Ecumenical Routes (1979) Fides/Claretian ISBN 978-0-8190-0635-6
- A Spirituality Named Compassion and the Healing of the Global Village, Humpty Dumpty and Us (1979), Winston Press, ISBN 0-03-051566-1, (1990) Harper San Francisco, paperback: ISBN 0-06-254871-9, (1999) Inner Traditions: ISBN 0-89281-802-6
- Whee! We, Wee All the Way Home: A Guide to the New Sensual Prophetic Spirituality (1980), Bear & Company, ISBN 0-939680-00-9
- Breakthrough: Meister Eckhart's Creation Spirituality, in New Translation (1980), Doubleday ISBN 0-385-17034-3 (translated from German, with commentary) (1980) Image, paperback, ISBN 978-0-385-17034-5; republished as Passion for Creation: The Earth-honoring Spirituality of Meister Eckhart (2000), Inner Traditions, ISBN 0-89281-801-8
- Western Spirituality: Historical Roots, Ecumenical Routes (1981), Bear & Company, ISBN 0-939680-01-7
- Manifesto for a Global Civilization (with Brian Swimme), 1982, Bear & Company, ISBN 978-0-939680-05-4
- Meditations with Meister Eckhart (1983), Bear & Company, ISBN 0-939680-04-1
- Original Blessing: A Primer in Creation Spirituality (1983), Bear & Company revised ed. 1996, ISBN 1-879181-27-4, Original Blessing: A Primer in Creation Spirituality Presented in Four Paths, Twenty-Six Themes, and Two Questions, (2000) Jeremy P. Tarcher/Putnam, ISBN 1-58542-067-0
- Illuminations on Hildegard of Bingen Text by Hildegard of Bingen/Commentary by Matthew Fox; (1985) Bear & Co. paperback ISBN 978-0-939680-21-4, Republished (2002) Bear & Company. paperback ISBN 978-1-879181-97-7
- Hildegard of Bingen's Book of Divine Works: With Letters and Songs (1987), Bear & Company, ISBN 0-939680-35-1
- The Coming of the Cosmic Christ (1988) Harper San Francisco, ISBN 0-06-062915-0 (1988) HarperOne, paperback, ISBN 978-0-06-062915-1
- Creation Spirituality: Liberating Gifts for the Peoples of the Earth (1991), Harper San Francisco, ISBN 0-06-062917-7
- Creation Spirituality and the Dreamtime, with Catherine Hammond, eds. (1991) Morehouse Publishing Co., ISBN 978-0-85574-364-2
- Sheer Joy: Conversations With Thomas Aquinas on Creation Spirituality (1992), Harper San Francisco, ISBN 0-06-062914-2 (2003) Tarcher/Putnam paperback: ISBN 1-58542-234-7, foreword: Rupert Sheldrake, afterword: Bede Griffiths, translation: Richard Tres
- The Reinvention of Work: A New Vision of Livelihood for Our Time, (1993) Harpercollins (hardcover) ISBN 978-0-06-062918-2 (1995) Harper One (paperback) ISBN 0-06-063062-0
- The Sacred Universe with Rupert Sheldrake, (1993) Sounds True (audiocassette) ISBN 978-1-56455-227-3
- Wrestling With the Prophets: Essays on Creation Spirituality and Everyday Life (1995), Harper San Francisco, ISBN 0-06-062919-3, (2003) Tarcher, paperback: ISBN 1-58542-235-5
- Passion for Creation: The Earth-honoring Spirituality of Meister Eckhart, (1995), Doubleday, ISBN 978-0-385-48047-5
- Vision: The Life and Music of Hildegard von Bingen with Hildegard of Bingen, Barbara Newman, Jane Bobko (1995) Studio ISBN 978-0-670-86405-8
- In the Beginning There Was Joy: A Celebration of Creation for Children of All Ages (1995) Crossroad Publishing Company ISBN 978-0-8245-1505-8, (1995) Godsfield Press Ltd. (paperback) ISBN 978-1-899434-65-7
- The Physics of Angels: Exploring the Realm Where Science and Spirit Meet (1996), coauthor Rupert Sheldrake, Harper San Francisco, ISBN 0-06-062864-2, Revised edition 2014, Monkfish Publishing Company, ISBN 9781939681287
- Natural Grace: Dialogues on Creation, Darkness, and the Soul in Spirituality and Science, with coauthor Rupert Sheldrake, (1996), Doubleday, ISBN 0-385-48356-2, (1997) Image paperback: ISBN 0-385-48359-7
- Confessions: The Making of a Post-Denominational Priest (1996), HarperOne ISBN 978-0-06-062865-9, (1997) Harper San Francisco, paperback: ISBN 0-06-062965-7, (Fox autobiography), updated edition 2015, North Atlantic Books, ISBN 978-1-58394-935-1
- A Spirituality Named Compassion (1999) Inner Traditions ISBN 978-0-89281-802-0
- One River, Many Wells: Wisdom Springing from Global Faiths (2000), Jeremy P. Tarcher, ISBN 1-58542-047-6, (2000)
- Sins of the Spirit, Blessings of the Flesh: Lessons for Transforming Evil in Soul and Society, (2000) Doubleday, hardcover, ISBN 978-0-609-60087-0, (2000) Three Rivers Press, paperback, ISBN 978-0-609-80580-0, Revised edition 2016, North Atlantic Books, ISBN 9781623170189
- Prayer: A Radical Response to Life 2001 Tarcher ISBN 978-1-58542-098-8
- Creativity: Where the Divine and the Human Meet (2002), Jeremy P. Tarcher, (hardcover) ISBN 1-58542-178-2, Tarcher (2004)
- Wrestling With the Prophets: Essays on Creation Spirituality and Everyday Life 2003 Tarcher ISBN 1-58542-235-5
- One River, Many Wells (2004) Tarcher, hardcover, ISBN 978-1-58542-047-6, (2004) Tarcher, paperback, ISBN 978-1-58542-326-2
- Sheer Joy (2003) Tarcher ISBN 1-58542-234-7
- A New Reformation: Creation Spirituality and the Transformation of Christianity (2006), Inner Traditions, hardcover, ISBN 1-59477-123-5 (Fox's "95 Theses"), (2006)
- The A.W.E. Project: Reinventing Education, Reinventing the Human (2006) CopperHouse paperback/CD/DVD edition ISBN 978-1-896836-84-3
- The Hidden Spirituality of Men: Ten Metaphors to Awaken the Sacred Masculine (2008) New World Library, hardcover, ISBN 978-1-57731-607-7, (2009) New World Library
- The Pope's War: Why Ratzinger’s Secret Crusade Has Imperiled the Church and How It Can Be Saved (2011), Sterling Ethos, ISBN 978-1-4549-0001-6
- Christian Mystics: 365 Readings and Meditations (2011), New World Library, ISBN 978-1-57731-952-8
- Hildegard of Bingen: A Saint For Our Times (2012), Namaste Publishing, ISBN 978-1-897238-73-8
- Occupy Spirituality: A Radical Vision For a New Generation (2013), coauthor Adam Bucko, North Atlantic Books, ISBN 978-1-58394-685-5
- Letters to Pope Francis (2013), Level Five Media, LLC, ISBN 1490372970
- Meister Eckhart: A Mystic-Warrior For Our Times (2014), New World Library, ISBN 978-1-60868-265-2
- Stations of the Cosmic Christ (2016), Tayen Lane Publishing, ISBN 978-0-9970196-6-7
- A Way To God: Thomas Merton’s Creation Spirituality Journey (2016), New World Library, ISBN 978-1-60868-420-5
- The Order of the Sacred Earth (2017), with Skylar Wilson and Jen Listug, Monkfish Publishing Company, ISBN 978-1-939681-86-7
- Julian of Norwich: Wisdom in a Time of Pandemic--And Beyond (2020), iUniverse, ISBN 978-1-6632-0868-2(sc) ISBN 978-1-6632-0869-9(e)

== See also ==
- Church of Divine Science
- Ernest Holmes
- Liberation theology
- New Age religion
- Otto Rank
- Religious naturalism
- Religious Science
- Unity Church
