= Jia Yuming =

Chinese Christian theologian and Bible commentator

Jia Yuming (Chinese: 賈玉銘; pinyin: Jiǎ Yùmíng; 1880 – 12 April 1964) was a Chinese Christian theologian and biblical commentator. He worked at several seminaries and eventually became a vice-chairperson of the Communist Party-aligned Three-Self Patriotic Movement. He self-identified as a fundamentalist and taught that "perfect salvation", which in his definition entailed becoming a "Christ-human", was the ultimate goal of all Christians.

== Biography ==
Jia was born in 1880 in Shandong. He attended Tengchow College, first graduating from its Faculty of Arts in 1901 and then from its Faculty of Theology in 1903. In 1929, he was awarded the degree of Doctor of Divinity by Westminster College in Missouri.

Having taught theology at the Nanjing Jinling Seminary since 1915, he was eventually ordained as a pastor in Shandong and subsequently appointed as the vice-president of the North China Theological Seminary in 1919. In 1930, he was appointed as the principal of the Jingling Girls' Theological Seminary. Jia also served as the leader of the Chinese Christian Bible Institute, which he co-founded in 1936, and the editor-in-chief of a Christian bulletin. In 1948, he was appointed as the vice-chairperson of the International Council of Christian Churches in the Netherlands.

The Three-Self Patriotic Movement (TSPM) was ostensibly formed to unify Protestants against imperialism, and in support of patriotism and the Chinese Communist Party. (Note: The Preparatory Council of the China Christian Resist-America Help-Korea Three-Self Reform Movement was introduced as an "institution-in-creation" by a group of Communist Party-aligned Protestants in early May 1951, against the backdrop of the Korean War. It was also envisioned as a successor to the National Christian Council of China. The organisation was formally launched in 1954 and renamed to the Three-Self Patriotic Movement (TSPM).) Jia initially declared, "Joining the TSPM is against the will of God." However, in the spring of 1954, after being visited by officers of the Bureau of Religious Affairs for several hours, he officially joined the TSPM and was elected as one of its seven vice-chairpersons. He was nonetheless persecuted by authorities during the 1957 Anti-Rightist Campaign, but escaped imprisonment unlike a few of his fundamentalist colleagues.

Jia suffered from poor health in his final years and died on 12 April 1964 in Shanghai.

== Theology ==
Having been reportedly baptised with the Holy Spirit in 1940 in Shanghai, Jia self-identified as a fundamentalist, although he regarded most of the characters in the Old Testament to be metaphorical. Abraham, for example, was a symbol of justification, while Jacob embodied victory.

Heavily influenced by dispensationalism as articulated by John Nelson Darby, which held that the world prior to Jesus' Second Coming was "hopelessly corrupt", Jia had a disdain for non-believers and reportedly only interacted with fellow Protestants, although he expressed hope that there would one day be billions of Chinese Christians. At the same time, he urged pastors to "learn from other religions" instead of "blindly criticising" them. Jia was also critical of the fact that there were distinct denominations of Christianity: "What is truly important is the church of Christ in which Christ walks, the church that is the body of Christ, the church that is the bride of Christ, the church that glories [sic] Christ."

Jia first began developing his theology by studying doctrines of salvation. He wrote in 1959: "The essence of the whole Bible is salvation, which is the perfect saving method prepared by God for the salvation of human beings." Jia championed the theory of "perfect salvation" (Chinese: 完全救恩; pinyin: wánquán jiù'ēn) as the ultimate goal of all Christians. He defined "perfect salvation" as "a category of personal cultivation", or in fact to become a "Christ-human" (Chinese: 基督人; pinyin: Jīdū rén): "Jesus is me and I am Jesus." In another lecture, Jia preached that "the Lord Jesus, the Word of God, was made into flesh because he wanted us to become the Word too."

"Perfect salvation" was also a "reading strategy". Jia believed that the Bible was a product of both God and humans, just like how Jesus could only have fed the multitude using the five fish and two loaves procured by his human disciples. The divine revelations in the Bible could only resonate with people and their lived experiences with such a joint authorship. With that in mind, Jia believed that "born-again" Christians would be empowered by the Holy Spirit to accurately interpret scripture, insofar as it was the Spirit who empowered and inspired the human authors of scripture in the first place. Jia elaborated that a believer's rational mind had to be "spiritualised" in order to comprehend spiritual mysteries. "Perfect salvation", therefore, had to be practised each day.

Sze-kar Wan posits that Jia's views, while containing traces of Neoplatonism, were most informed by the Lu-Wang branch of Neoconfucianism which read Chinese classics as a moral guide. John Yieh argues that Jia's apparent belief in theosis (union with God) could have been due to his "life experience with the devastation of wars and violence".

== Legacy ==
Jia was one of the earliest Chinese Protestant theologians. With a career spanning more than four decades, many of his writings became textbooks in seminaries. He mentored numerous preachers and theologians in China. According to Otto Lui, Jia was "one of the most important Chinese church leaders and scholars in the twentieth century". He was also, in Wai Luen Kwok's words, "representative of Chinese fundamentalist theologians of the first half of the twentieth century." Dennis Balcombe called Jia "China's foremost Bible teacher", while Xie Longyi described him as the "Irenaeus of China".
