= Jin Mingri =

Pastor of Zion church of Beijing

- 金明日
- Born: 1969 (age 56–57); Heilongjiang, China
- Other name: Ezra Jin
- Education: Peking University (BA); Nanjing Union Theological Seminary (MDiv); Fuller Theological Seminary (DMin)
- Children: 1

Jin Mingri (Chinese: 金明日, born 1969), also known as Ezra Jin, is the pastor of Zion Church of Beijing, an independent Chinese Christian church in Beijing, China. The church started in 2007 and soon grew to over 1,000 worshippers. Journalist Evan Osnos said Jin has a "lively televangelist flair".

Born in Heilongjiang, he is part of the Korean ethnic minority in China. He is a graduate of Beijing University (BA), Nanjing Union Theological Seminary (MDiv) and Fuller Theological Seminary (DMin). Following the 1989 Tiananmen Square protests and massacre, he started attending a Three-Self Patriotic Movement church. Within a few months, he became a Christian convert.

In 2018, the authorities shut down the church and put the pastor under house arrest. In October 2025, Jin was detained by Chinese authorities along with more than 20 other members of Zion Church. In July 2026, Jin was released and arrived in Los Angeles on July 4.
