= North China Theological Seminary =

Theological seminary of North China

North China Theological Seminary (simplified Chinese: 华北神学院; traditional Chinese: 華北神學院; pinyin: Huáběi Shénxuéyuàn; abbreviated as NCTS) was one of the largest and well-known fundamentalist Protestant seminaries in mainland China in the first half of the twentieth century. It was founded in 1919, but its operations were suspended in 1949 due to the Chinese Civil War.

In 1952, it merged into Nanjing Union Theological Seminary, which continues to exist today. However, former staff who in 1949 left the mainland for Taiwan eventually re-established NCTS in Taiwan, in 1991.

== History ==
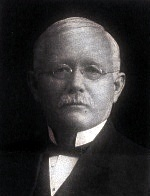
Watson Hayes, the first principal of North China Theological Seminary

The North China Theological Seminary was established in 1919 out of a split from the Shandong Christian University, the latter of which was divided over a number of theological and administrative issues. Watson Hayes, originally the acting dean of the theological college of Shandong Christian University, was trusted by Chinese churches and appointed as the first principal of North China Theological Seminary. Established during the fundamentalist-modernist controversy in North America, North China Theological Seminary placed the authority of the bible at a central place in the vision of the seminary. During the 1930s, some would even consider in the "Westminster Seminary of China," named as such due to the role that Westminster Theological Seminary in Philadelphia played in the fundamentalist-modernist controversy.

Chinese Christians played an important role in founding and leading the seminary, as well as providing for its financial needs. Some of its most notable faculty include well-known Chinese Christians such as Ding Limei and Jia Yuming. Presbyterian missionaries associated with the seminary also took interest in the rise of independent Chinese evangelists such as John Sung, Watchman Nee, and Wang Ming-Dao, seeing their preaching as representing the "pure gospel" which called for repentance from one's sins.

In 1943, all the missionaries from the NCTS were arrested by the Japanese army during the Second Sino-Japanese War. In 1944, Watson Hayes died in a concentration camp. Though reopened in 1945, the NCTS was closed again in 1949 due to the Huaihai campaign.

In 1952, NCTS was eventually merged into Nanjing Union Theological Seminary, which continues to exist today.

However, in 1949, one of NCTS's former staff, Hu Hongwen (Chinese: 胡鴻文) moved to Taiwan and operated a seminary called Chongzheng Christ Seminary (Chinese: 崇正基督神學院; pinyin: Chóngzhèng jīdū shén xuéyuàn), and later Oriental Seminary (Chinese: 東方神學院; pinyin: Dōngfāng shén xuéyuàn). In 1991, Hu Hongwen reestablished the NCTS in Taiwan and became its president.

== See also ==
- Watson Hayes
- Hunan Bible Institute
- Nanjing Union Theological Seminary
- Fundamentalist-Modernist Controversy
