= Francis Wilson Price =

Francis Wilson Price, sometimes known as Frank W. Price (1895–1974) was a missionary of the PCUS to China.

== Biography ==
Born in Jiaxing, Zhejiang province in China to missionary parents, Philip Francis Price and Esther Wilson Price, he was educated in the United States at Davidson College (BA 1915), Columbia University (MA 1923), and Yale Divinity School (BD 1922; PhD 1938).

After working with the International YMCA and the Chinese Labour Corps in France during the war, he earned a Bachelor of Divinity degree from Yale Divinity School in 1922. When he returned to China in 1923, his ability in the Chinese language and his faculty position at Nanking Seminary allowed him access to many Chinese friends and colleagues. In 1927 Price made a translation of Sun Yat-sen's Three Principles of the People, a basic text of the Nationalist Party, which established a close relationship with Chiang Kai-shek (he and Chiang were both born in Zhejiang). In the early 1930s, he was influenced by the Rural Reconstruction Movement of Y.C. James Yen to set up an experiment in Christian village life just outside Nanking. He described these experiences in his book, The Rural Church in China

During much of the 1930s and 1940s Price was not only a spiritual advisor to Chiang Kai-shek, but he also worked for the Nationalist government translating speeches, writing speeches, and during World War II he was director of a military English-language school for Chinese soldier translators. After the outbreak of the Second Sino-Japanese War in 1937, the Nationalist government sent Price to the United States to promote American support for China.

In 1952, after he and his wife were held in detention for nearly two years, he was deported from China. He became director of the Missionary Research Library in New York.
