= Watson McMillan Hayes =

American Presbyterian missionary and educator

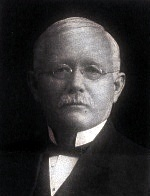
- Watson M. Hayes
- Born: November 23, 1857 near Greenfield, Mercer County, Pennsylvania, United States
- Died: August 2, 1944 (aged 86); Weifang, China
- Occupation: missionary,
- Years active: 62 Years
- Known for: Educational Mission in China
- Spouse: Margaret Young Hayes
- Children: John D. Hayes, Ernest M. Hayes.
- Parent(s): David Hayes, Margaret Jane Watson Hayes

Watson McMillan Hayes (Chinese: 赫士; pinyin: Hèshì, November 23, 1857 – August 2, 1944) was an American Presbyterian missionary and educator in China.

== Biography ==
Watson M. Hayes was the son of David Hayes (born April 6, 1832, killed in February 1865 in the American Civil War) and Margaret Jane (Watson) Hayes (born June 28, 1828). He graduated from Allegheny College and entered Western Seminary, Pittsburgh in 1879.

On August 15, 1882, he was ordained and sent to China in the same year. He taught at Tengchow College and later served as its president in present-day Penglai, Shandong. In 1901, he was invited by Yuan Shikai to organize Shandong College, the forerunner of Shandong University and the second modern university in China. With the backing of Yuan Shikai, he also published Shandong's first successful newspaper (Shantung Times, Chinese: 山东时报; pinyin: Shāndōng Shíbào) and petitioned the Qing court to grant a holiday on Sundays for government schools and colleges; Shandong College was closed on Sundays right from the start. However, by the end of 1901, Hayes and six Chinese Christian teachers he had brought with him had resigned already over disagreements regarding the policy of mandatory Confucius worship for students of the college. After that, Hayes went on to teach at the Presbyterian Mission Theological College in Cheefoo (Yantai).

When the Shandong Christian University was formed through an agreement between the Northern Presbyterian mission and the English Baptist mission, Haynes became the dean of the Theological College in 1916. However, after theological conflicts arose in the college due to the fundamentalist-modernist controversy, Haynes was asked to resign in 1919. He would later be appointed as the principal of the newly formed North China Theological Seminary.

During the Second Sino-Japanese War, W. M. Hayes, together with his wife (Margaret Young Hayes) and one of his sons (John David Hayes), was held as a prisoner in the Weihsien (Weixian) Internment Camp, a civilian assembly center operated by the Japanese on the premises of a former Presbyterian mission in the present-day town of Weifang. Hayes was forced to leave from his home for the camp in March 1943. He refused to be repatriated under the "Prisoners Exchange Project" organized by the International Red Cross. Suffering from diabetes, W. M. Hayes died in the camp on August 2, 1944, a bit more than one year before the camp was liberated by the Americans on August 12, 1945.

W. M. Hayes' son John D. Hayes (1888–1957), continued to work as a missionary and English teacher in China until he was arrested and tried as a spy in 1951. After 10 months in jail, he was expelled from China. His trial in China was the topic of an article ("The Brainwashing of John Hayes", written by Frederic Sondern, Jr) published in Reader's Digest (July 1955) and a television drama of the same title (teleplay by George Bruce, aired on TV Reader's Digest by ABC on 7 November 1955) in which Hayes was portrayed by the actor Vincent Price.
