= Cosmic Christ =

Theological view of Jesus Christ's concern for the cosmos

The cosmic Christ is a view of Christology which emphasises the extent of Jesus Christ's concern for the cosmos. The biblical bases for a cosmic Christology is often found in Colossians, Ephesians, and the prologue to the gospel of John.

== Early church ==
Irenaeus (c. 130 – c. 202 AD) offered one of the earliest articulations of a cosmic Christology in his Against Heresies. In his theory of atonement, Irenaeus speaks about how all of humanity was created good but tainted by sin, but that all of creation was "recapitulated" and restored under the new headship of Christ. This "cosmic" Christology would be a dominant view throughout much of the patristic period, as well as within Eastern Christianity, while alternative positions began to arise during the medieval period.

== Modern ecotheology ==
In the modern period, a renewed interest in the cosmic Christ would arise among a number of Western scholars interested in developing an ecotheology.

Pierre Teilhard de Chardin was among the first to speak again of a cosmic Christ in the 1920s and 1930s. He understood the Incarnation as bringing the historical Christ into the material world and, through evolution, leading all of creation towards perfection in the Omega Point.

Later scholars, such as Joseph Sittler, Matthew Fox, Richard Rohr and Jürgen Moltmann, would likewise speak about the need to reclaim a cosmic Christology to speak about Christ's concern for creation.

== Asian contexts ==
The cosmic Christ has also been of particular interest amongst Asian Christians.

This was particularly poignant through debates that arose from the World Council of Churches meeting in New Delhi in 1961, when the Indian Paul D. Devanandan argued from Ephesians 1:10 that a cosmic Christ united all things to himself; this, he claimed, included non-Christian religions. This would continue to be asserted by South Asian Christians such as M. M. Thomas from India and D. T. Niles of Ceylon as a rationale to dialogue with and work together with other religions.

In China, it has been suggested that a cosmic Christology has been present in the early 20th century, among figures such as T. C. Chao and Y. T. Wu. The cosmic Christ has also been important for later Chinese Christians affiliated with the Three-Self Patriotic Movement in the 1980s and 1990s. For instance, K. H. Ting used the cosmic Christ as a basis for Christians to work with communists, and Wang Weifan offers an evangelical version of the cosmic Christ to work with non-Christians.
