= K. H. Ting =

Chinese church leader (1915–2012)

Bishop K. H. Ting
- Native name: 丁光訓
- Church: Chung Hua Sheng Kung Hui, China Christian Council
- Other posts: Chinese People's Political Consultative Conference, National People's Congress

Personal details
- Born: 20 September 1915 Shanghai, China
- Died: 22 November 2012 (aged 97) Nanjing, Jiangsu, China
- Denomination: Anglicanism
- Spouse: Kuo Siu-May
- Children: Stephen Yenren Ting, Heping Ting
- Education: St. John's University, Columbia University, Union Theological Seminary

K. H. Ting
- Traditional Chinese: 丁光訓
- Simplified Chinese: 丁光训
Transcriptions
Standard Mandarin
- Hanyu Pinyin: Dīng Guāngxùn
- Wade–Giles: Ting^{1} Kuang^{1}-hsun^{4}

K. H. Ting, Ting Kuang-hsun or Ding Guangxun (Chinese: 丁光訓; 20 September 1915 – 22 November 2012), was chairperson emeritus of the Three-Self Patriotic Movement (TSPM) and President emeritus of the China Christian Council, the government-approved Protestant church in China.

Ting was trained in the Anglican tradition and, in 1955, was consecrated as Anglican Bishop of Chekiang. As he never renounced his ordination, he remained a bishop until his death. However, in 1958 the Anglican Church in China came to an end as an independent institution in mainland China, leaving Ting with no episcopal functions to perform.

Ting had also held a number of political posts. He was a vice-chairman of the Chinese People's Political Consultative Conference (1989–2008), and a member of the National People's Congress, China's legislature.

== Biography ==
Ting was educated at Shanghai's Saint John's University (1937–42), graduating B.A. in 1937 and B.D. in 1942. In the same year, he was ordained as an Anglican deacon and married Siu-May Kuo (1916–1995), both taken place at the Church of Our Savior on Wu Yuan Road, Shanghai.

From 1942 to 1945, Ting worked in the administration of the YMCA. In 1946, he and his wife moved to Canada, where he became missions secretary of the Canadian Student Christian Movement. Ting studied at Columbia University and at Union Theological Seminary, both in New York City, from 1947 to 1948, gaining a master's degree in arts and theology. From 1948 to 1951, he worked in the administration of the World Student Christian Federation in Geneva, Switzerland.

In 1951 the Tings returned to China with their young son Stephen Yenren Ting, born in November 1948. Their second son Heping Ting was born in July 1952. Ting went on to serve as general manager of the Shanghai-based Chinese Christian Literature Society from 1951 to 1953, when he became principal of Nanjing Union Theological Seminary.

In 1954, shortly after the establishment of the People's Republic of China, 138 Chinese Christian leaders presented the Christian Manifesto to the country, pledging the support of Christians for anti-imperialism, anti-feudalism, and the struggle against bureaucratic capitalism. This manifesto would launch the Three-Self Patriotic Movement, (Note: The term "three-self" refers to the missiological principles of building an indigenous church that is self-governing, self-supporting, and self-propagating.) of which Ting was elected to the standing committee in the same year. In 1955, he was consecrated as the Anglican bishop of Zhejiang. By 1957, the Three-Self Patriotic Movement claimed the loyalty of the overwhelming majority of Christians in China.

In 1958, the Anglican Church in China was merged into the Chinese Christian Church and Ting lost his positions in the Anglican Church, but he remained a bishop in the eyes of many Chinese Christians and the wider Anglican Church. He returned to prominence in the 1970s. In 1980, he became President of the China Christian Council and leader of the TSPM, positions he held until 1997. In 1985, Ting helped found the Amity Foundation and remained its president as well as being principal of Nanjing Union Theological Seminary until his death. In 1988, Ting proclaimed that "the church should be in tune with socialism, but should not be a government department", proposing the end of the Three-Self Movement by 1991. This proposal was rejected after the Tiananmen Square protests of 1989.

Ting died on 22 November 2012, and his body was cremated on 27 November. Yu Zhengsheng attended his funeral on behalf of the central government. Several Chinese Anglican leaders, such as Peter Kwong and Paul Kwong, led Ting's funeral service on 8 December at Christianity Mochou Road Church.

== Theology ==
Before the 1950s, influenced by his predecessor Y. T. Wu, Ting joined the Young Men's Christian Association (YMCA), attempting to devote himself to the national salvation and advocating that Christianity focuses not just individual salvation, but also social salvation. At that time, he also appreciated communism, although cautiously. In 1948 when he commented on the civil war in China, he wrote:

With the fall of Chiang and the Kuomintang government, and after the defeat of contemporary Chinese reactionaries who now rally around Chiang, a democratic coalition government will be formed in which Communists, Democratic Leaguers, progressive Nationalists and members of other anti-reactionary parties will all participate. What Americans think of as a Communist dictatorship is not in the wind for China's future.

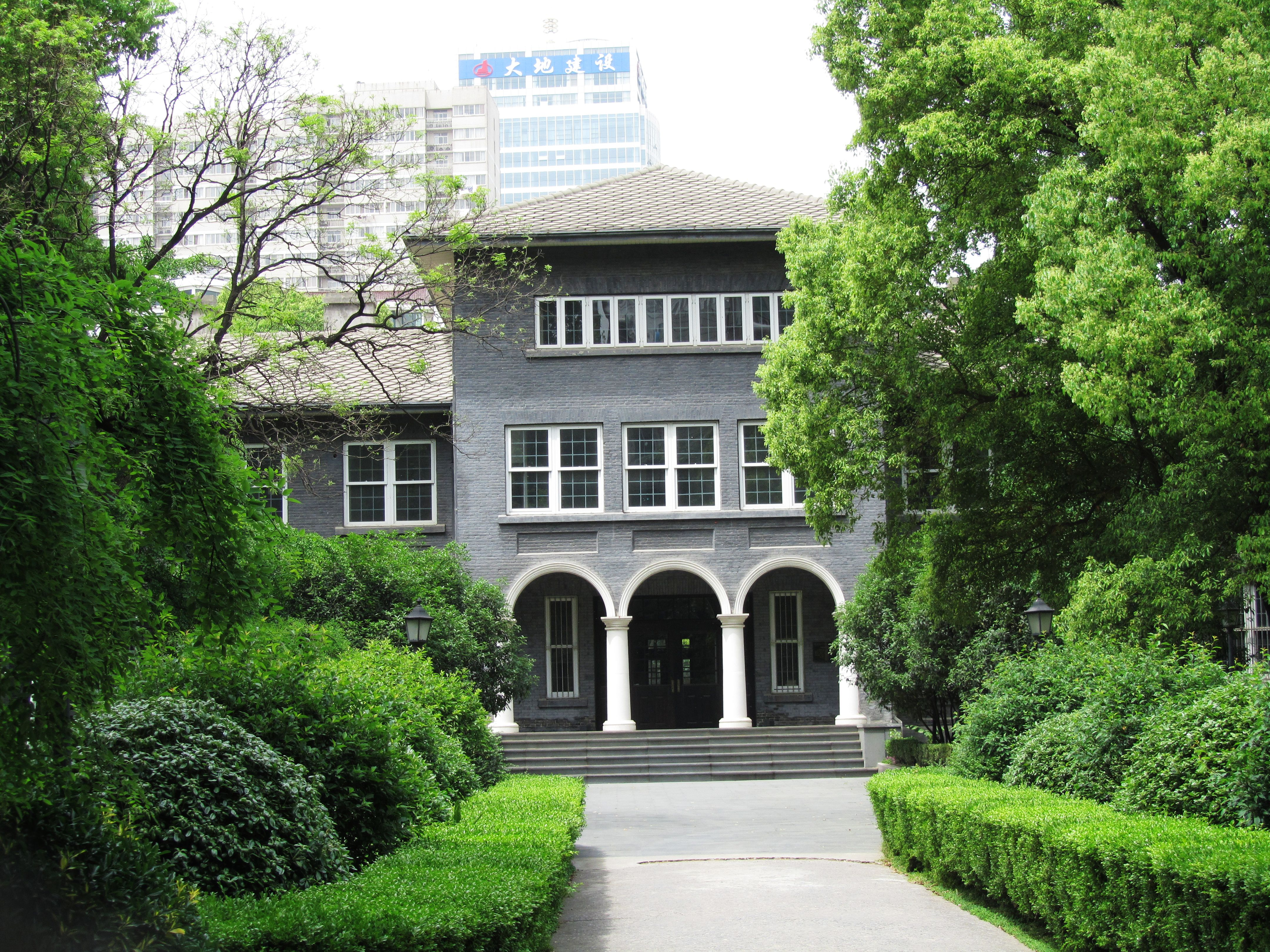
Nanjing Union Theological Seminary, the flagship seminary of the Three-Self Patriotic Movement

After he returned the new China in 1951, he joined the Three-self movement which was led by Y. T. Wu and chose to cooperate with the CCP regime. Ting became one of the most influential Christian leaders in the national Three-self Patriotic Movement and the China Christian Council since the 1980s.

=== Theological reconstruction ===
Ting's writings were mainly published after the 1980s. Ting formally started to construct his theological discourse aiming to deal with the relation of Christian faith with communism and other religions; meanwhile, he promoted "theological reconstruction" (simplified Chinese: 神学思想建设; traditional Chinese: 神學思想建設; pinyin: shénxué sīxiǎng jiànshè) in an attempt to construct indigenous theology on the basis of Chinese socio-political and religio-cultural context. It was also seen by some as an attempt to remove fundamentalist and evangelical forms of Christianity from the Chinese church.

=== Ecclesiology ===
The TSPM was regarded as the application of the three principles of self-governance, self-support, and self-propagation. Ting claimed that "it is work of God." Ting avidly accused Wang Mingdao of distorting the meaning of three principles and refusing to cooperate with TSPM. Besides, he believed that the church should play an active role in the society for serving the people, rather than cling to the church just paying attention to individual salvation.

=== Christology ===
Ting summarizes that a Cosmic Christ encompasses two aspects:

(1) the universal extent of Christ's domain, concern and care, and (2) the kind of love which we get a taste of in Jesus Christ as we read the Gospels being the first and supreme attribute of God and the basic to the structure and dynamic of the universe, in the light of which we get an insight as to how things go in the world.

Influenced greatly by the thinking of Pierre Teilhard de Chardin and process theology based on the writings of Alfred North Whitehead, Ting argues that creation is a long process in which Christ not just participated in creation in the beginning, but continues to sustain the incomplete creation. Redemption is in the process of creation. Following this, he contends that not Christians but humankind are involved in Christ's redemptive work. In this way, he appeals to Christians to appreciate the values in communism and other religio-cultural resources.

=== The sinned against ===
With regards to the doctrine of sin, Ting has pushed away from the traditional emphasis on people as "sinners" but also as individuals who are "sinned against." Ting is opposed to creating "antagonism between believers and nonbelievers" by aggressive proselytization, favoring brotherly love towards and not condemnations to hell of Chinese non-Christians. Because China is a Confucian society where the theory of the goodness of human nature is the mainstream. The emphasis of "The sinned against" leads people to know the love of God and receive consolation after a long-time oppression and suffering in the history.

=== Justification by faith ===
Ting has argued that the doctrine of justification by faith has been misunderstood by many Christians and that it was originally meant to liberate humans rather than consign people to hell. Because of this, he has been accused of replacing the traditional Protestant doctrine with justification by love, to support the notion that those who God's love are within the boundaries of Christianity; it is therefore considered to be an attempt to reconcile the atheistic ideology of communism with Christianity in order to maintain good relations with the People’s Republic of China. However, he has explicitly stated that he neither understands what the phrase means but considers it a misleading imitation of justification by faith.

=== Relation between Christians and atheists ===
Ting considered that Christians should get along well with non-Christians and atheists of all sorts. Besides, he further stresses that "Provisional unities of truths we can observe with joy and thanksgiving because they illuminate us and point toward the ultimate unity in Christ which is the promise of his revelation."

== Works ==
- God is Love: Collected Writings of Bishop K. H. Ting, Cook Communications Ministries International, 2004. ISBN 0-7814-4233-8
- No Longer Strangers: Selected Writings of K. H. Ting, edited by Raymond L. Whitehead, Orbis Books, 1989. ISBN 0-88344-653-7
- Love Never Ends: Papers by K. H. Ting, edited by Janice Wickeri, Yilin Press, 2000. ISBN 7-80657-067-5
- A Chinese Contribution to Ecumenical Theology: Selected Writings of Bishop K. H. Ting, edited by Janice and Philip Wickeri, WCC Publications, 2002. ISBN 2-8254-1358-5

== See also ==
- Protestant missions in China

== Notes ==
Religious titles
Preceded by Deng Shukun	Bishop of the Diocese of Chekiang of Chung Hua Sheng Kung Hui; 1955–1958	Succeeded by Position revoked
New title	Chairman of the Amity Foundation; 1985–2012	Succeeded by Vacant
New title	President of Nanjing Union Theological Seminary; 1980–2010	Succeeded by Gao Feng
New title	President of the China Christian Council; 1st–3rd	Succeeded by Han Wenzao
New title	Honorary President of the China Christian Council; 4th–6th	Succeeded by Vacant
Preceded by Y. T. Wu	President of the National Committee of Three-Self Patriotic Movement of the Protestant Churches in China; 3rd–5th	Succeeded by Luo Guanzong
Preceded by Wu Yi-fang	Honorary President of the National Committee of Three-Self Patriotic Movement of the Protestant Churches in China; 6th–8th	Succeeded by Vacant
Government offices
Preceded by Zhao Puchu	President of China Committee of Religion and Peace; 2004–2009	Succeeded by Pagbalha Geleg Namgyai
