= Beijing Zion Church =

Protestant church in China

Beijing Zion Church (Chinese: 北京锡安教会; pinyin: Běijīng xī ān jiàohuì) is a Protestant church founded in Beijing in 2007 by the pastor Jin Mingri. The church is considered very influential in China alongside Shouwang Church of Beijing (pastor Jin Tianming, not related to Jin Mingri). Zion Church grew to over a 1,000 members in a few years. However, the church was closed by the authorities in 2018 with its pastor under house arrest.

Before it was shut down, it "operated with relative freedom for years, hosting hundreds of worshippers every weekend in an expansive, specially renovated hall in north Beijing". In 2025, Jin Mingri and 29 other church leaders were arrested in nationwide raids. The church's attorneys have faced intimidation from the authorities and some have had their licenses revoked. In September 2026, a lawyer who defended the church and its members fled to Taiwan, citing pressure from Chinese authorities.

== See also ==
- Christianity in China
- Antireligious campaigns in China
