= Chinese Theological Review =

- Discipline: Religious Studies
- Language: English
- Edited by: Janice Wickeri

Publication details
- History: 1985–present
- Publisher: Foundation for Theological Education in South East Asia (China)

Standard abbreviations
- ISO 4: Chin. Theol. Rev.

Indexing
- ISSN: 0896-7660

Links
- Journal homepage

Chinese Theological Review is an English-language journal of Protestantism in China. It is mainly made up of essays, sermons, and official statements of the Three-Self Patriotic Movement and the China Christian Council, translated from Chinese. Since 1985, the journal has been edited by Janice Wickeri and published by the Foundation for Theological Education in South East Asia.
