= Christianity in China =

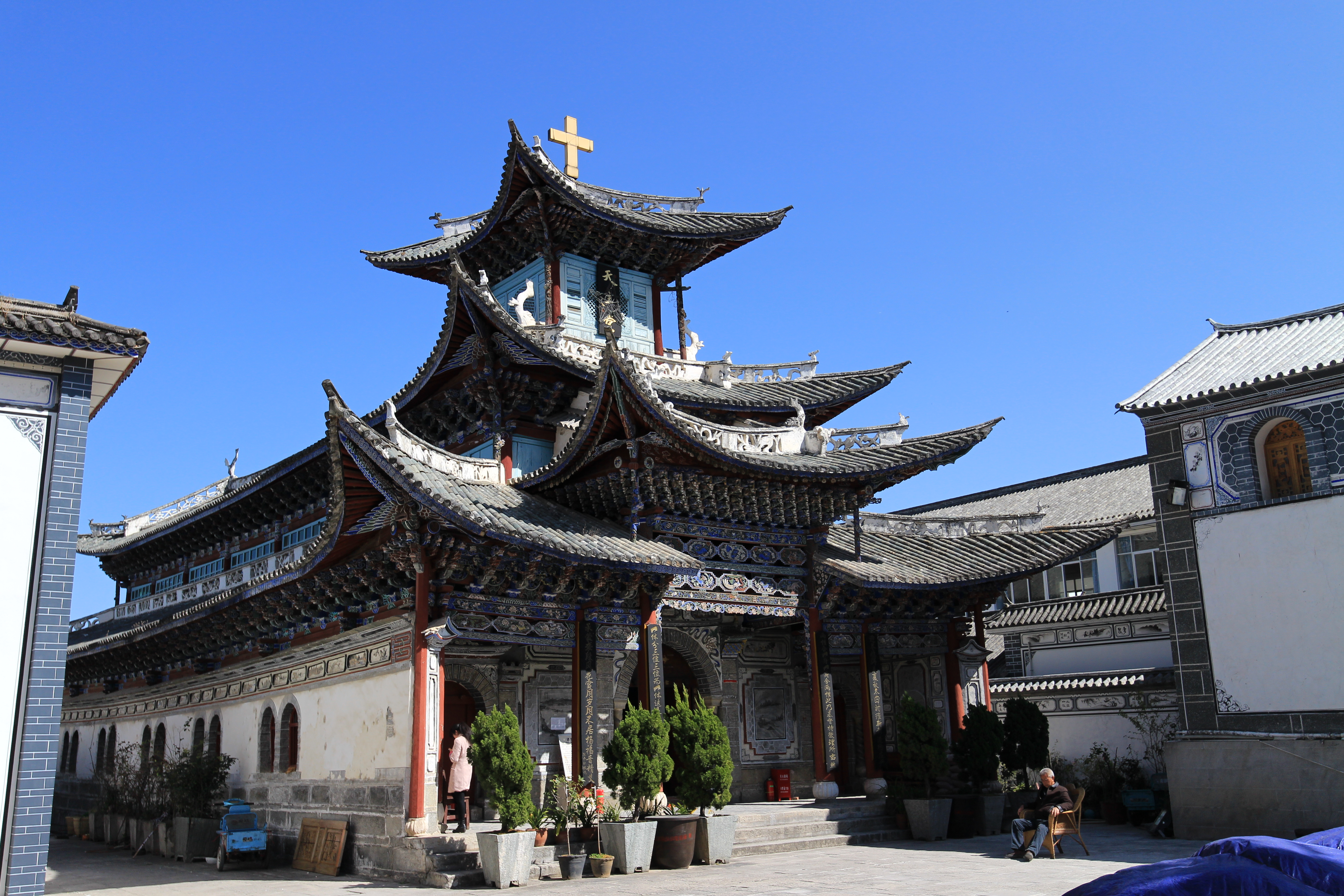
- Cathedral of the Sacred Heart in Dali, Yunnan

Total population
- c. 20 million (≈2% of adults) formal self-identification according to national surveys (Pew Research Center 2023; Hackett & Tong 2025)

Regions with significant populations
- Inner China

Religions
- Christianity (mostly Protestant and Catholic)

Languages
- Chinese and other languages

Christianity has been present in China since the early medieval period, and became a significant presence in the country during the early modern era. The Church of the East appeared in China in the 7th century, during the Tang dynasty. But it did not take root in China until its reintroduction by the Jesuits during the 16th century. Beginning in the early 19th century, Protestant missions in China attracted small but influential followings, and independent Chinese churches were also established.

Accurate data on Chinese Christians is difficult to access. There were around 4 million Christians before 1949 (3 million Catholics and 1 million Protestants). The number of Chinese Christians had increased significantly since the easing of restrictions on religious activities during the reform and opening up of the late 1970s. In 2018, the State Council Information Office declared that there are over 44 million Christians (38 million Protestants and 6 million Catholics) in China. On the other hand, some international Christian organizations estimate that there are tens of millions more, who choose not to publicly identify as such. These estimations are controversial because the organizations which make them are often accused of deliberately inflating them.

For most of Chinese imperial history, religious practice was tightly controlled by the state. The People's Republic of China also heavily regulates religion, and has increasingly implemented a policy of sinicization of Christianity since 2018. Chinese people over the age of 18 are only allowed to join Christian groups that are registered with one of three state-controlled bodies, the Chinese Catholic Patriotic Association, the China Christian Council, or the Protestant Three-Self Patriotic Movement. However, many Chinese Christians are members of informal networks and underground churches, often known as house churches. These began to proliferate during the 1950s when many Christians rejected the state-controlled bodies. Members of house churches represent diverse theological traditions, and have been described as representing a "silent majority" of Chinese Christians.

== Terminology ==
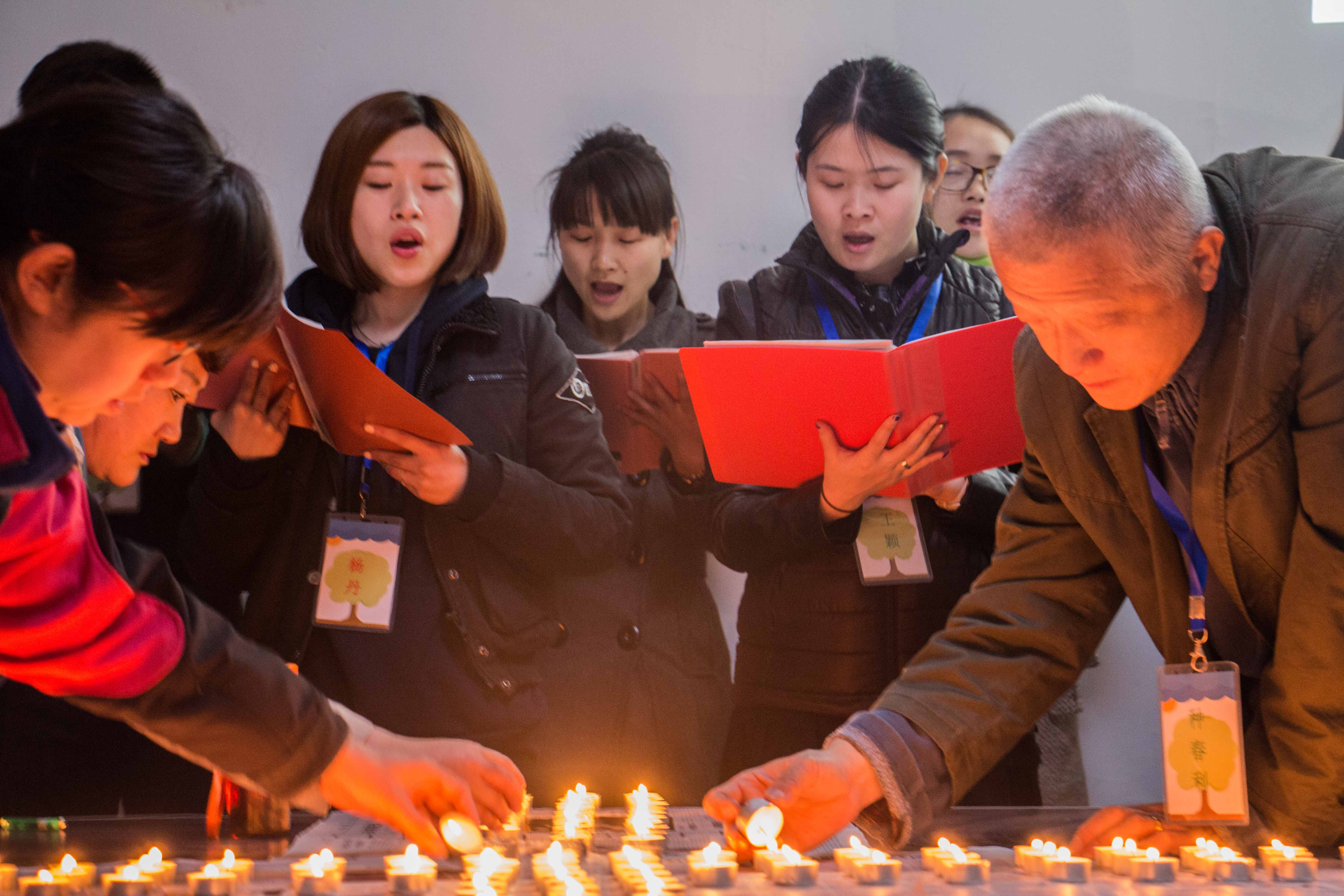
Han Chinese Christians lighting candles in a church in Shunyi, Beijing.

There are various names used for the Abrahamic God in the Chinese language, the most prevalent of them is "Shangdi" (上帝; 'Highest Emperor'), commonly used by both Protestants and non-Christians, and "Tianzhu" (天主; 'Lord of Heaven'), commonly used by Catholics. The word "Shen" (神), which is also used by Chinese Protestants, may also refer to deities or the generative powers of nature in the context of Chinese traditional religion. In addition, Christians have historically adopted terms from the Chinese classics as references to God, such as 'Ruler' (主宰; Zhǔzǎi) and 'Creator' (造物主; Zàowùzhǔ).

Chinese terms for Christian denominations include "Protestantism" (基督教新教; Jīdū jiào xīn jiào; 'New Christian religion'), "Catholicism" (天主教; Tiānzhǔ jiào; 'Heavenly Lord religion'), and "Eastern Orthodoxy" (东正教; 東正教; Dōng zhèng jiào). Orthodox Christianity as a whole is referred to as Zhèng jiào (正教). Christians in China are referred to as 'Christ followers' (基督徒; Jīdū tú) or 'Christ religion followers' (基督教徒; Jīdū jiào tú).

== History ==
=== Pre-modern history ===
The significant lack of evidence of Christianity's existence in China between the 3rd century and the 7th century can likely be attributed to the barriers which were placed in Persia by the Sassanids and the closure of the trade route in Turkestan.

Both events prevented Christians from staying in contact with their mother church, the Syriac Antiochian Church, thereby halting the spread of Christianity until the reign of Emperor Taizong of Tang (627–649). Taizong, who had studied the Christian Scriptures which were given to him by the Assyrian missionary Alopen, realized "their propriety and truth and specifically ordered their preaching and transmission."

His virtues have been made manifest to you, and that unheard-of power over things, whether that which was openly exercised by Him or that which was used over the whole world by those who proclaimed Him: it has subdued the fires of passion, and caused races, and peoples, and nations most diverse in character to hasten with one accord to accept the same faith. For the deeds can be reckoned up and numbered which have been done in India, among the Seres [China], Persians, and Medes; in Arabia, Egypt, in Asia, Syria; among the Galatians, Parthians, Phrygians; in Achaia, Macedonia, Epirus; in all islands and provinces on which the rising and setting sun shines.

— Arnobius of Sicca, "Against the Heathen, Book II"

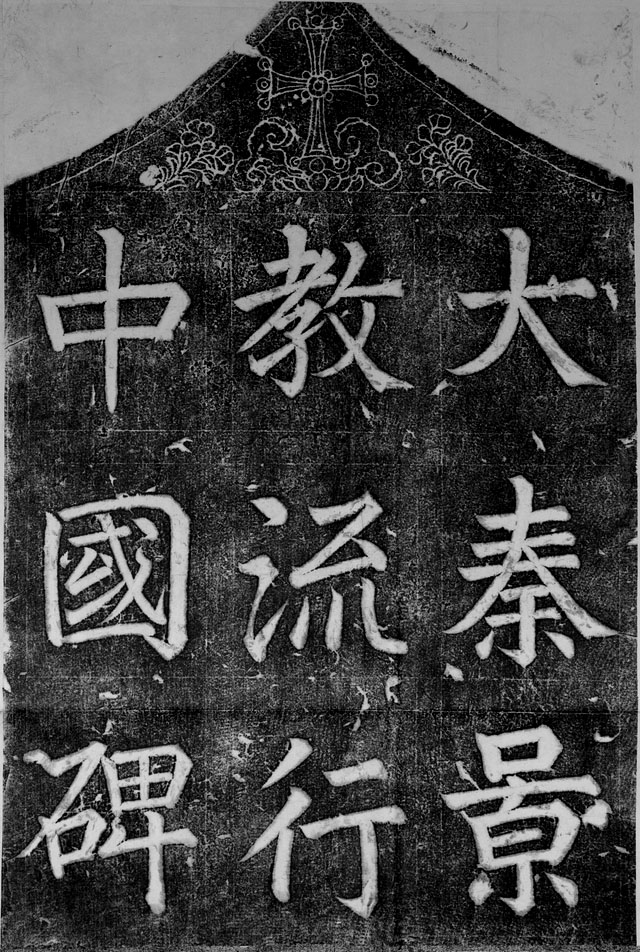
The Xi'an Stele was erected in 781, and documents 150 years of early Christian history in China. It includes texts both in Chinese and in Syriac.

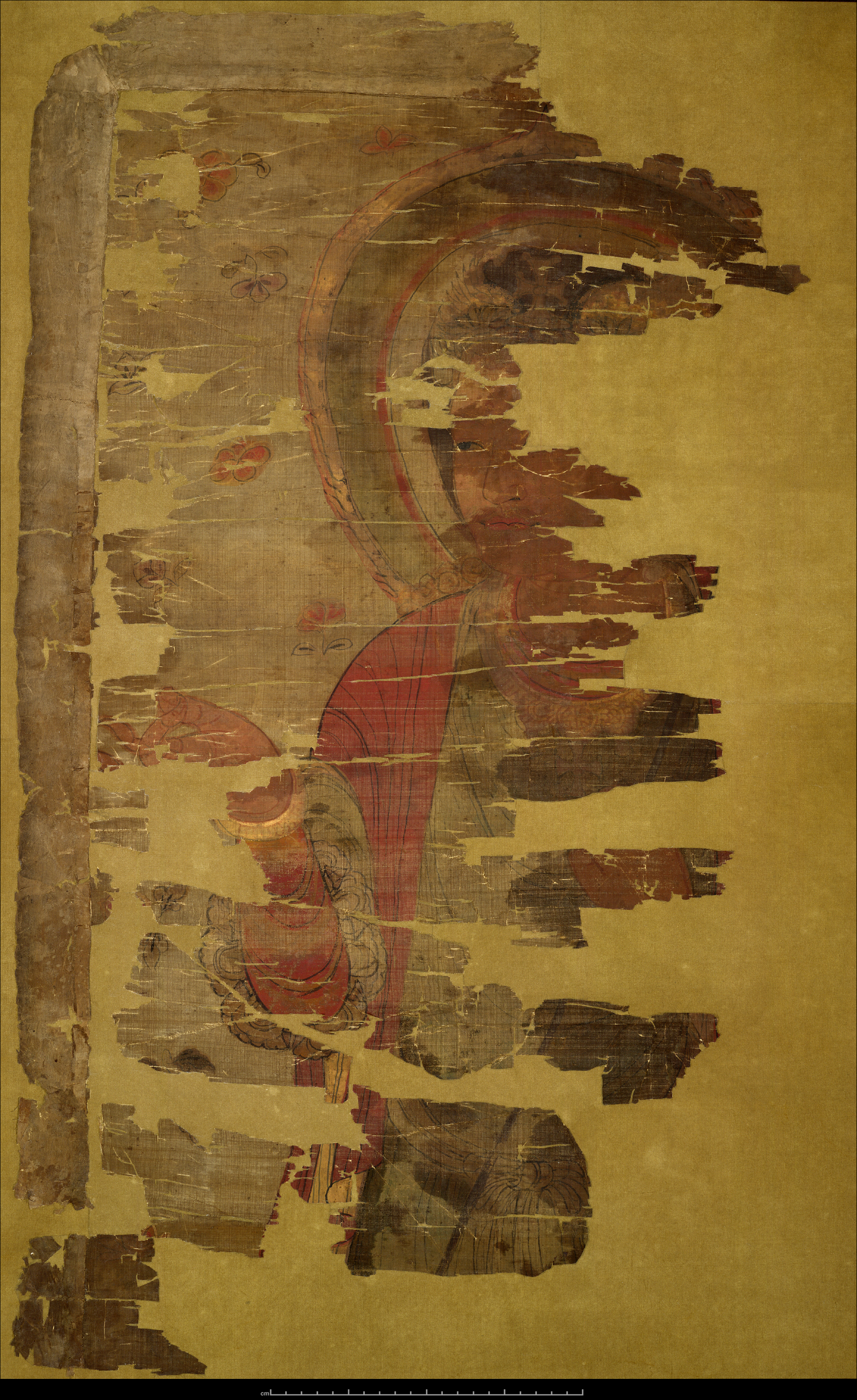
A 9th-century silk painting depicting a saint, probably Jesus Christ

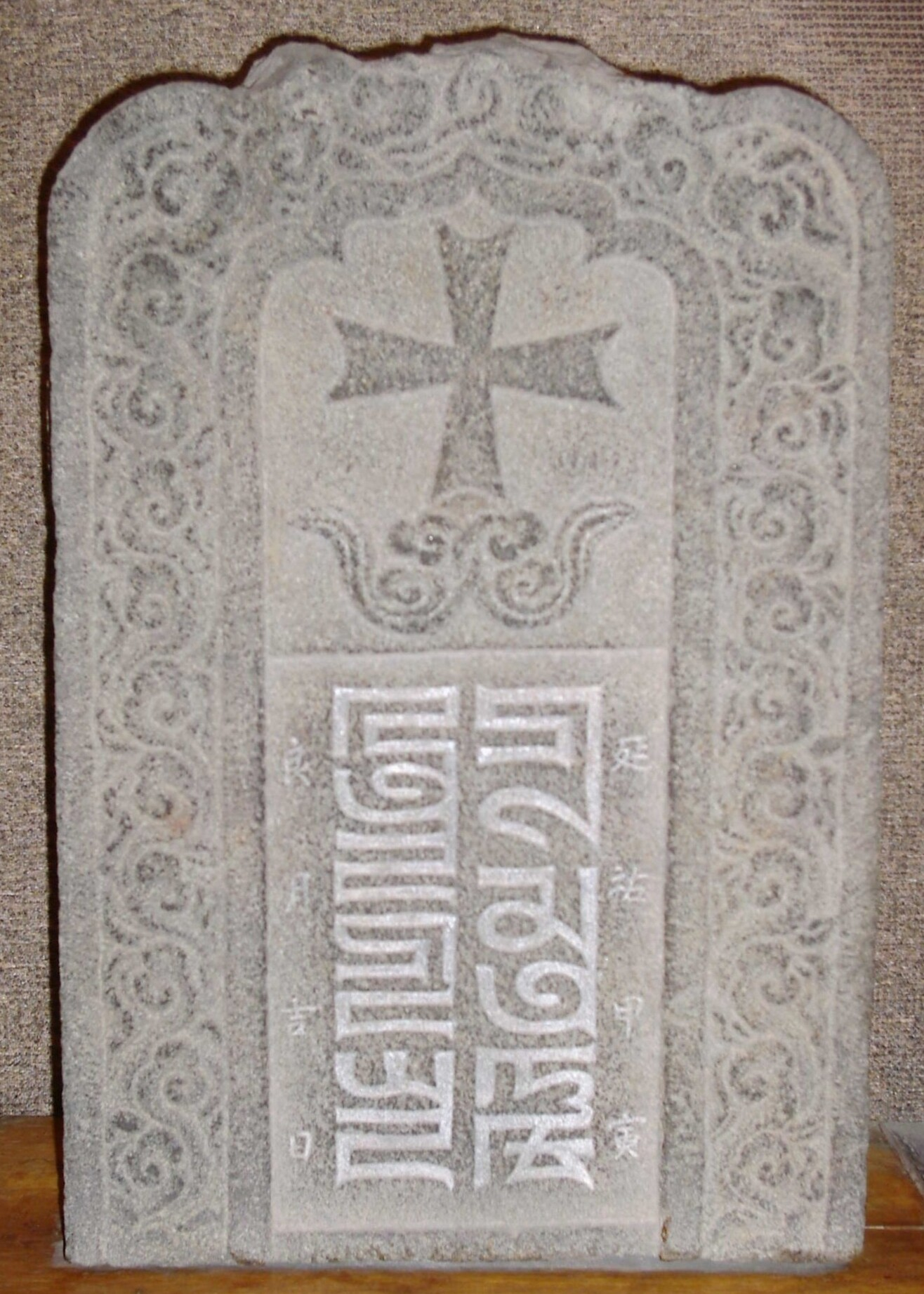
Christian tombstone from Quanzhou with a 'Phags-pa inscription dated 1314.

==== Early period ====
The Christian apologist Arnobius (died c. 330) claimed in his work Against the Heathen: Book II, that Christianity had reached the land of "Serica"—an ancient Roman name for northern China. However, to date, there is little to no archaeological evidence or knowledge about the pre-Church of the East classical Chinese and/or Tocharian church.

Two (possibly Church of the East) monks were preaching Christianity in India in the 6th century before they smuggled silkworm eggs from China to the Byzantine Empire.

The first documentation of Christianity entering China was written on the 8th-century Xi'an Stele. The stele records that Christians reached the Tang capital of Xi'an in 635, and were allowed to establish places of worship and to propagate their faith. The leader of the Christian travellers was Alopen, and his meeting with Emperor Taizong was the most influential development in Chinese Christian history yet, leading to the spread of the religion to a much greater extent than ever before. Seven Chinese Christian texts survived from that period.

Some modern scholars question whether Nestorianism is the proper term for the Christianity that was practised in China, since it did not adhere to what was preached by Nestorius. They instead prefer to refer to it as "Church of the East", a term which encompasses the various forms of early Christianity in Asia.

Despite inaccuracies by Tang historians regarding Christian history and doctrine, there was a significant community of scholars who translated the Old and New Testaments into Literary Chinese, and understood them fully.

In 845, at the height of the Great Anti-Buddhist Persecution, Emperor Wuzong of Tang decreed that Buddhism, Christianity, and Zoroastrianism be banned, and their very considerable assets forfeited to the state.

In 986 a monk reported to the Patriarch of the East:

Christianity is extinct in China; the native Christians have perished in one way or another; the church has been destroyed and there is only one Christian left in the land.

Karel Pieters noted that some Christian gravestones are dated from the Song and Liao dynasties (ca. 900s to 1200s), implying that some Christians remained in China in these eras.

==== Medieval period ====
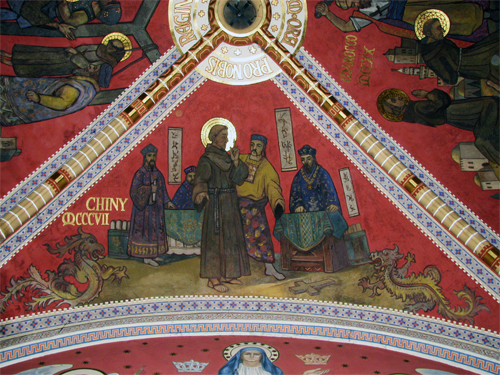
Painting of Chinese Martyrs of 1307, Chapel of the Martyrs of Nepi in Katowice Panewniki

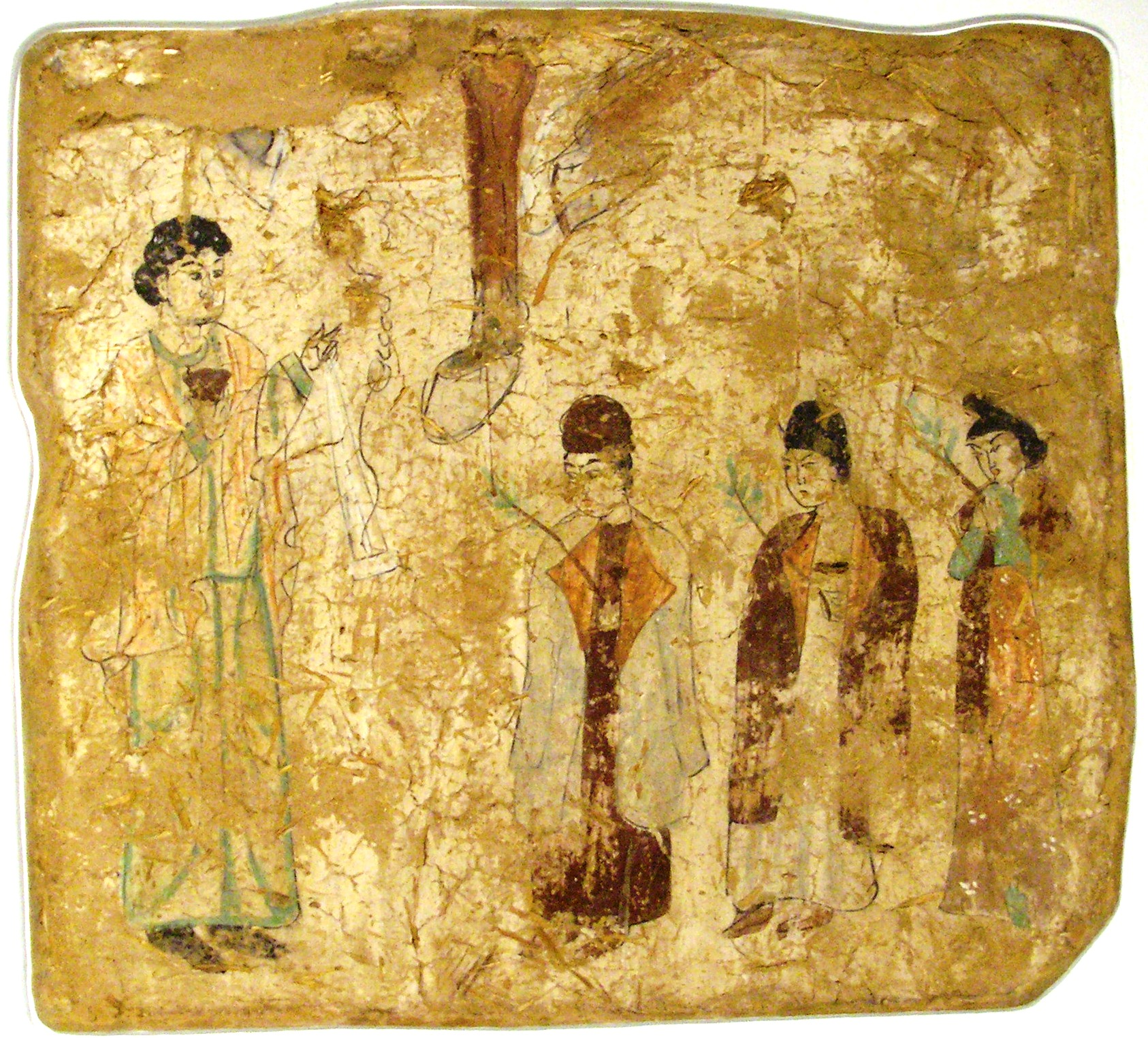
"Procession on Palm Sunday", in a 7th- or 8th-century wall painting from a Church of the East church in Tang China

Christianity was a major influence in the Mongol Empire, as several Mongol tribes were primarily Church of the East Christian, and many of the wives of Genghis Khan's descendants were Christian. Contacts with Western Christendom also began in this time period, via envoys from the papacy to the capital of the Yuan dynasty in Khanbaliq (present-day Beijing).

Church of the East Christianity was well established in China, as is attested by the monks Rabban Bar Sauma and Rabban Marcos, both of which had made a famous pilgrimage to the West, visiting many Church of the East communities along the way. Marcos was elected as Patriarch of the Church of the East, and Bar Sauma went as far as visiting the courts of Europe in 1287–1288, where he told Western monarchs about Christianity among the Mongols.

In 1294, Franciscan friars from Europe initiated mission work in China. For about a century they worked in parallel with the Church of the East Christians. The Franciscan mission disappeared from 1368, as the Ming dynasty set out to eject all foreign influences.

The Chinese called Muslims, Jews, and Christians starting in the Yuan dynasty by the same name, "Hui Hui" (Hwuy-hwuy). Christians were called "Hwuy who abstain from animals without the cloven foot", Muslims were called "Hwuy who abstain from pork", Jews were called "Hwuy who extract the sinews". "Hwuy-tsze" (Hui zi) or "Hwuy-hwuy" (Hui Hui) is presently used almost exclusively for Muslims, but Jews were still called "Lan Maou Hwuy tsze" (Lan Mao Hui zi) which means "Blue-cap Hui zi". At Kaifeng, Jews were called "Teaou-kin-keaou", "extract-sinew religion". Jews and Muslims in China shared the same name for synagogue and mosque, which were both called "Tsing-chin sze" (Qingzhen si), "temple of purity and truth", the name dated to the thirteenth century. The synagogue and mosques were also known as "Le-pae sze" (Libai si). A tablet indicated that Judaism was once known as "Yih-tsze-lo-nee-keaou" (Israelitish religion) and synagogues known as "Yih-tsze lo née leen" (Israelitish temple), but it faded out of use.

It was also reported that competition with the Catholic Church and Islam were also factors in causing Church of the East Christianity to disappear in China; Catholics also considered the Church of the East as heretical, speaking of "controversies with the emissaries of [...] Rome, and the progress of Mohammedanism, sapped the foundations of their ancient churches."

Kublai Khan doubled down on anti-Muslim anti-Halal slaughter laws under pressure from Christians like Isa Kelemechi who served in Kublai's court, according to Rashid al-Din. Isa Kelemechi was also instrumental in reinforcing anti-Muslim prohibitions in the Mongol realms, such as prohibiting halal slaughter and circumcision, and, according to Rashid al-Din encouraged denunciation of Muslims. Isa Kelemechi also showed to Khubilai the Muslim precept of "Kill the polytheists, all of them", raising the suspicion of the Mongols towards Muslims. According to Rashid al-Din, as a result "most Muslims left Khitai".

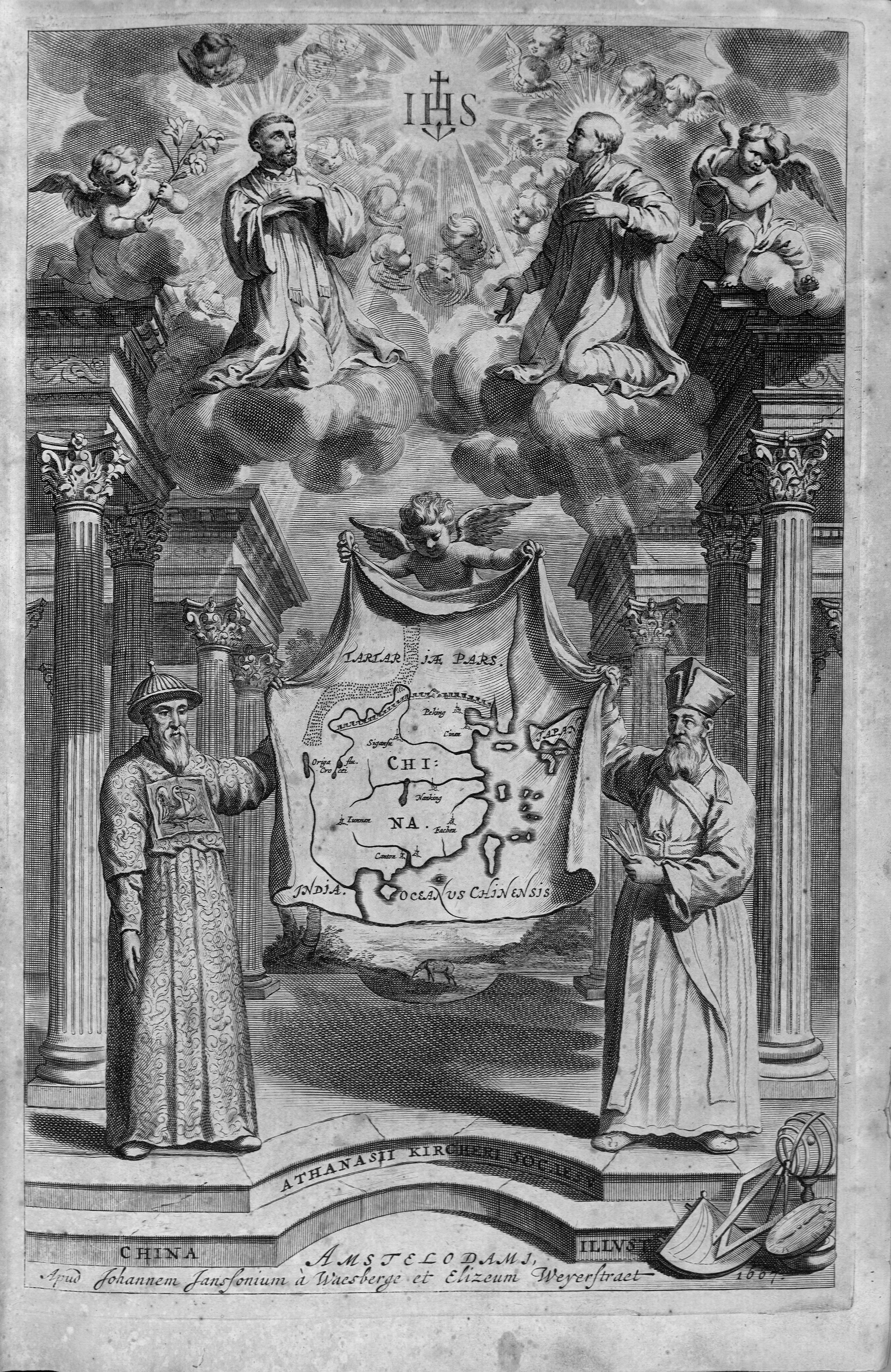
The frontispiece of Athanasius Kircher's 1667 China Illustrata, depicting Francis Xavier and Ignatius of Loyola adoring the monogram of Christ in Heaven while Johann Adam Schall von Bell and Matteo Ricci labor on the Jesuit missions to China

==== Jesuit missions in China ====
By the 16th century, there is no reliable information about any practising Christians remaining in China. Fairly soon after the establishment of the direct European maritime contact with China in 1513 and the creation of the Society of Jesus in 1540, at least some Chinese become involved with the Jesuit effort. As early as 1546, two Chinese boys became enrolled into the Jesuits' St. Paul's College in Goa, the capital of Portuguese India. Antonio, one of these two Christian Chinese, accompanied St. Francis Xavier, co-founder of the Jesuits, when he decided to start missionary work in China. However, Xavier was not able to find a way to enter China and died in 1552 on Shangchuan Island off the coast of Guangdong.

With the Portuguese Empire establishing an enclave on Zhongshan Island's Macao Peninsula, Jesuits established a base nearby on Green Island (now Macao's Ilha Verde neighborhood). Alessandro Valignano, the new regional manager ("Visitor") of the order, came to Macao in 1578–1579 and established St. Paul's College to begin training the missionaries in Chinese language and culture. He requested assistance from the orders' members in Goa in bringing over suitably talented linguists to staff the college and begin the mission in earnest.

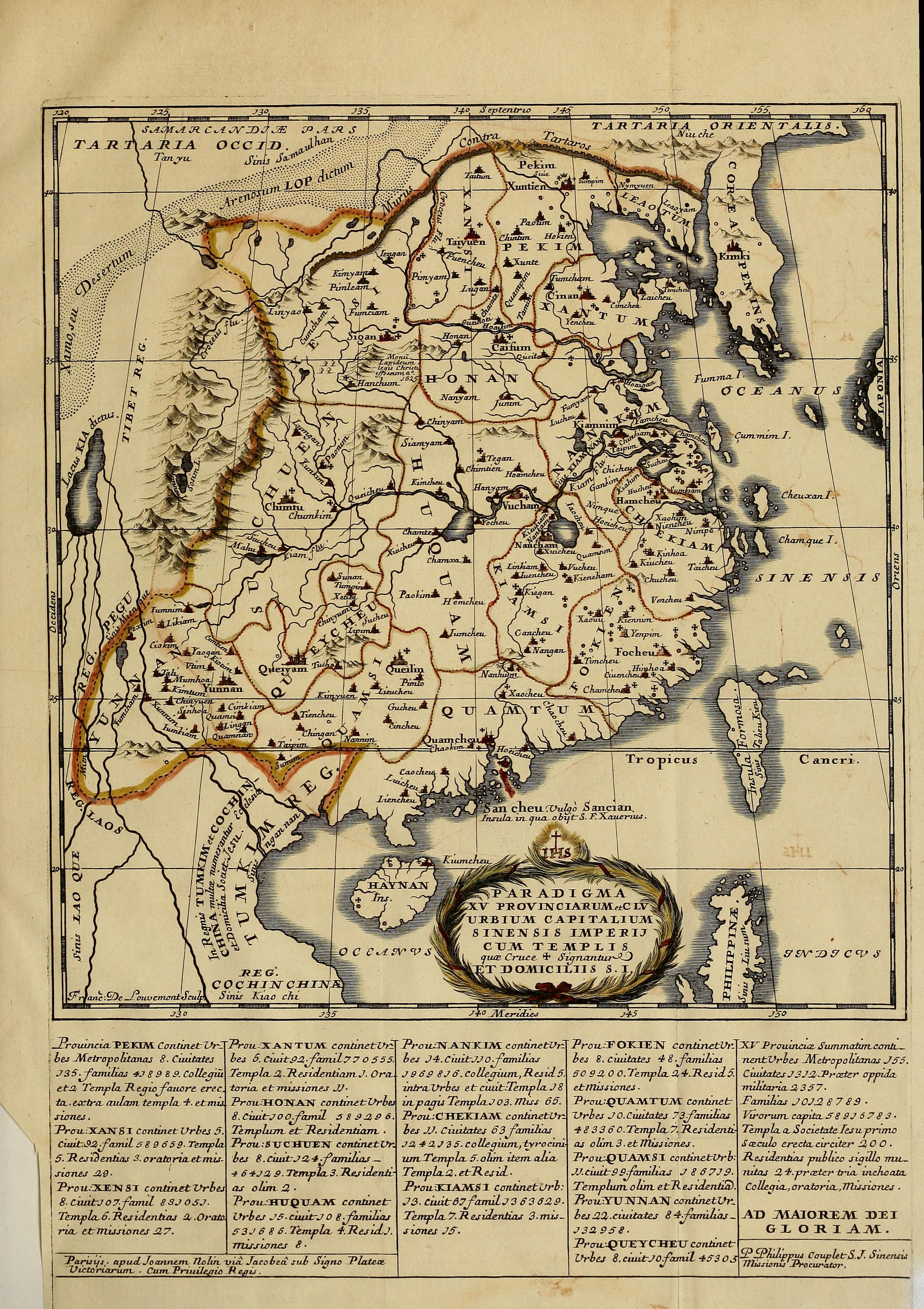
A map of the 200-odd Jesuit churches and missions established across China at the time of Philippe Couplet & al.'s 1687 Confucius, Philosopher of the Chinese.

In 1582, Jesuits once again initiated mission work inside China, introducing Western science, mathematics, astronomy, and cartography. Missionaries such as Matteo Ricci and Johann Adam Schall von Bell wrote Chinese catechisms and made influential converts like Xu Guangqi, establishing Christian settlements throughout the country and becoming close to the imperial court, particularly its Ministry of Rites, which oversaw official astronomy and astrology. Ricci and others including Michele Ruggieri, Philippe Couplet, and François Noël undertook a century-long effort in translating the Chinese classics into Latin and spreading knowledge of Chinese culture and history in Europe, influencing the developing Enlightenment. The Jesuits also promoted phenomena of artistic hybridization in China, such as Chinese Christian cloisonné productions.

The introduction of the Franciscans (the first round of Catholic Church clergy to have come during this era) and other orders of missionaries, however, led to a long-running controversy over Chinese customs and names for God. The Jesuits, the secularized scholar-bureaucrats, and eventually the Kangxi Emperor himself maintained that the Chinese veneration of ancestors and Confucius were respectful but non-religious rituals compatible with Christian doctrine; other orders pointed to the beliefs of the common people of China to show that it was impermissible idolatry and that the common Chinese names for God confused the Creator with His creation. Acting on the complaint of the Bishop of Fujian, Pope Clement XI finally ended the dispute with a decisive ban in 1704; his legate Charles-Thomas Maillard De Tournon issued summary and automatic excommunication of any Christian permitting Confucian rituals as soon as word reached him in 1707. By that time, however, Tournon and Bishop Maigrot had displayed such extreme ignorance in questioning before the throne that the Kangxi Emperor mandated the expulsion of Christian missionaries unable to abide by the terms of Ricci's Chinese catechism. Tournon's policies, confirmed by Clement's 1715 bull Ex illa die led to the swift collapse of all of the missions across China, with the last Jesuits—obliged to maintain allegiance to the papal rulings—finally being expelled after 1721. It was not until 1939 that the Catholic Church revisited its stance, with Pope Pius XII permitting some forms of Chinese customs. The Second Vatican Council later confirmed the new policy.

=== 17th to 18th centuries ===
Further waves of missionaries came to China during the Qing dynasty (1644–1911) as a result of contact with foreign powers. Russian Orthodoxy was introduced in 1715 and Protestants began entering China in 1807.

The Yongzheng Emperor was firmly against Christian converts among his own Manchu people. He warned them that the Manchus must follow only the Manchu way of worshipping Heaven since different peoples worshipped Heaven differently. He stated:

The Lord of Heaven is Heaven itself. . . . In the empire we have a temple for honoring Heaven and sacrificing to Him. We Manchus have Tiao Tchin. The first day of every year we burn incense and paper to honor Heaven. We Manchus have our own particular rites for honoring Heaven; the Mongols, Chinese, Russians, and Europeans also have their own particular rites for honoring Heaven. I have never said that he [Urcen, a son of Sun] could not honor heaven but that everyone has his way of doing it. As a Manchu, Urcen should do it like us.

=== 19th to 20th centuries ===
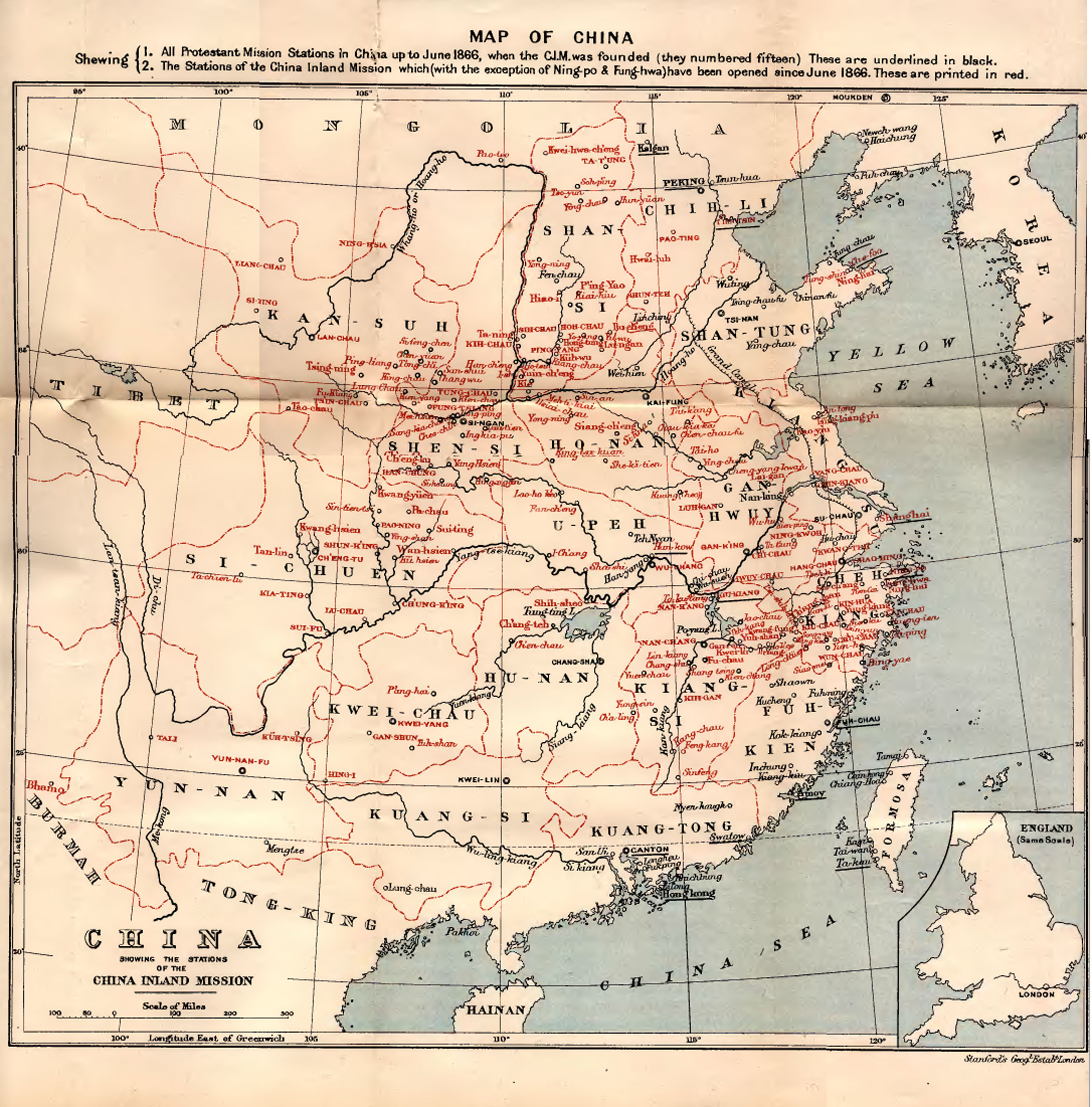
Stations of the China Inland Mission in 1902, with hubs in Zhejiang, and between Gansu, Shanxi, Shaanxi and Henan.

By the 1840s China became a major destination for Protestant missionaries from Europe and the United States. Catholic missionaries, who had been banned for a time, returned a few decades later. It is difficult to determine an exact number, but historian Kathleen Lodwick estimates that some 50,000 foreigners served in mission work in China between 1809 and 1949, including both Protestants and Catholics. They encountered significant opposition from local elites, who were committed to Confucianism and resented Western ethical systems. Missionaries were often seen as part of Western imperialism. The educated gentry were afraid for their own power. The mandarins claim to power lay in the knowledge of the Chinese classics—all government officials had to pass extremely difficult tests on Confucianism. The elite currently in power feared this might be replaced by the Bible, scientific training and Western education. Indeed, the examination system was abolished in the early 20th century by reformers who admired Western models of modernization.

The main goal was conversions, but they made relatively few. They were much more successful in setting up schools, as well as hospitals and dispensaries. They avoided Chinese politics, but were committed opponents of opium. Western governments could protect them in the treaty ports, but outside those limited areas they were at the mercy of local government officials and threats were common. They were a prime target of attack and murder by Boxers in 1900.

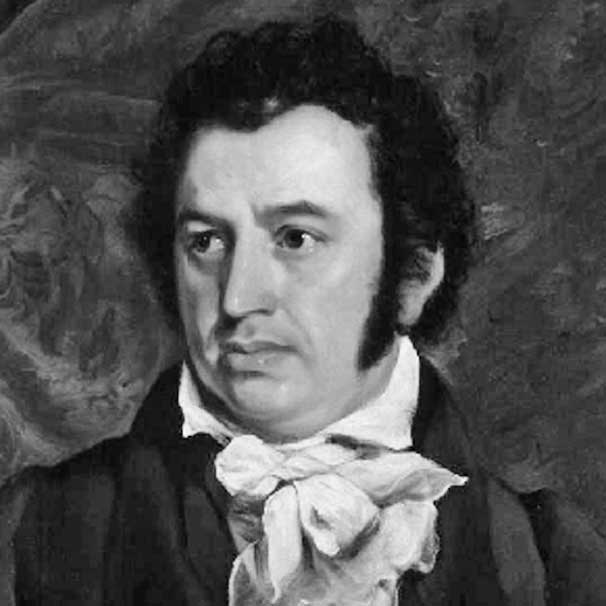
Robert Morrison of the London Missionary Society.

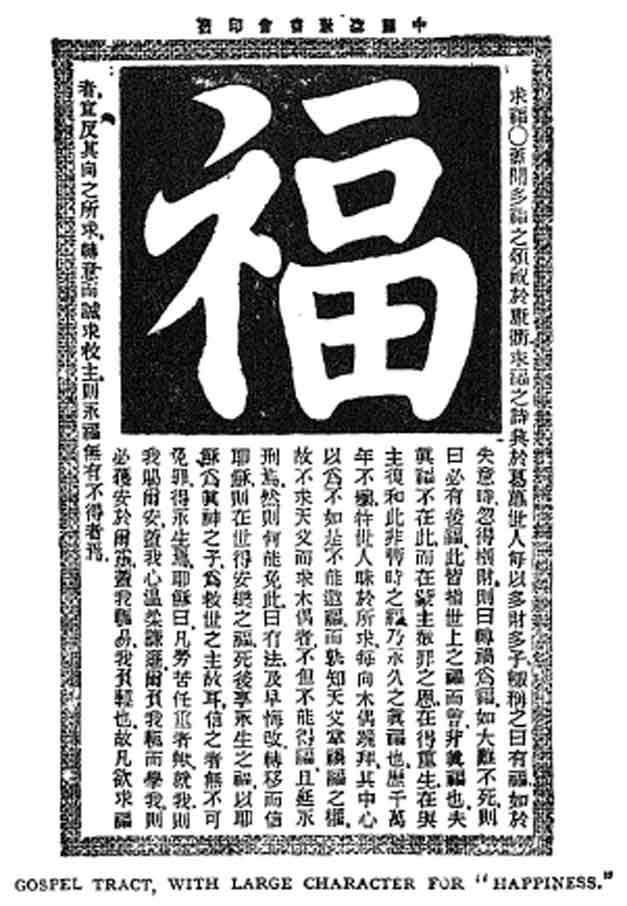
A Gospel tract printed by the China Inland Mission, With a strong fundamentalist approach.

==== Protestant missions ====
140 years of Protestant missionary work began with Robert Morrison, arriving in Macau on 4 September 1807. Morrison produced a Chinese translation of the Bible. He also compiled a Chinese dictionary for the use of Westerners. The Bible translation took 12 years and the completion of the dictionary, 16 years.

==== Hostile laws ====
The Qing government code included a prohibition of "Wizards, Witches, and all Superstitions". The Jiaqing Emperor, in 1814, added a sixth clause with reference to Christianity, modified in 1821 and printed in 1826 by the Daoguang Emperor prohibiting those who spread Christianity among Han Chinese and Manchus. Christians who would not renounce their conversion were to be sent to Muslim cities in Xinjiang, to be given as slaves to Muslim leaders and beys. Some hoped that the Chinese government would discriminate between Protestantism and the Catholic Church, since the law was directed at Rome, but after Protestant missionaries in 1835– 36 gave Christian books to Chinese, the Daoguang Emperor demanded to know who were the "traitorous natives in Canton who had supplied them with books".

==== Rapid growth after 1842 ====
The pace of missionary activity increased considerably after the First Opium War in 1842. Christian missionaries and their schools, under the protection of the Western powers, went on to play a major role in the westernization of China during the 19th and 20th centuries. Liang Fa worked in a printing company in Guangzhou, and came to know Robert Morrison in 1810, who translated the Bible into Chinese, and needed printing of the translation. When William Milne arrived at Guangzhou in 1813 and worked with Morrison on translation of the Bible, he also came to know Liang, who he baptized in 1816. In 1827, Liang was ordained by Morrison, and thus, he became a missionary for the London Missionary Society, and the first Chinese Protestant minister and evangelist.

During the 1840s, Western missionaries promulgated Christianity in officially designated coastal treaty ports that were open to foreign trade. The Taiping Rebellion (1850–1864) originated in the influence of missionaries on its leader Hong Xiuquan, who called himself the younger brother of Jesus Christ, but he was denounced as a heretic by mainstream Christian groups. Hong's revolt against the Qing government lead to the establishment of the Taiping Heavenly Kingdom, and its capital was established at Nanjing. Hong attained control of significant parts of southern China, at its height, the Taiping Heavenly Kingdom ruled around 30 million people. Hong's theocratic and militaristic regime instituted social reforms which included the strict separation of the sexes, the abolition of foot binding, land socialization, the suppression of private trade, and the replacement of Confucianism, Buddhism and Chinese folk religion with Hong's version of Christianity. The Taiping rebellion was eventually put down by the Qing army, which was aided by French and British forces. With an estimated death toll of between 20 and 30 million due to warfare and the resulting starvation, this civil war is considered one of history's deadliest conflicts. Sun Yat-sen and Mao Zedong viewed the Taiping as heroic revolutionaries who fought against a corrupt feudal system.

==== Hospitals and schools ====
Christians established clinics and hospitals, and provided training for nurses. Both Catholics and Protestants founded educational institutions from the primary to the university level. Some prominent Chinese universities began as religious-founded institutions. Missionaries worked to abolish practices such as foot binding, and the unjust treatment of maidservants, as well as launching charitable work and distributing food to the poor. They also opposed the opium trade and brought treatment to many who were addicted.

Several early leaders of the Republic of China were converts to Christianity and were influenced by its teachings, such as Sun Yat-sen.

==== Expanding beyond the port cities ====
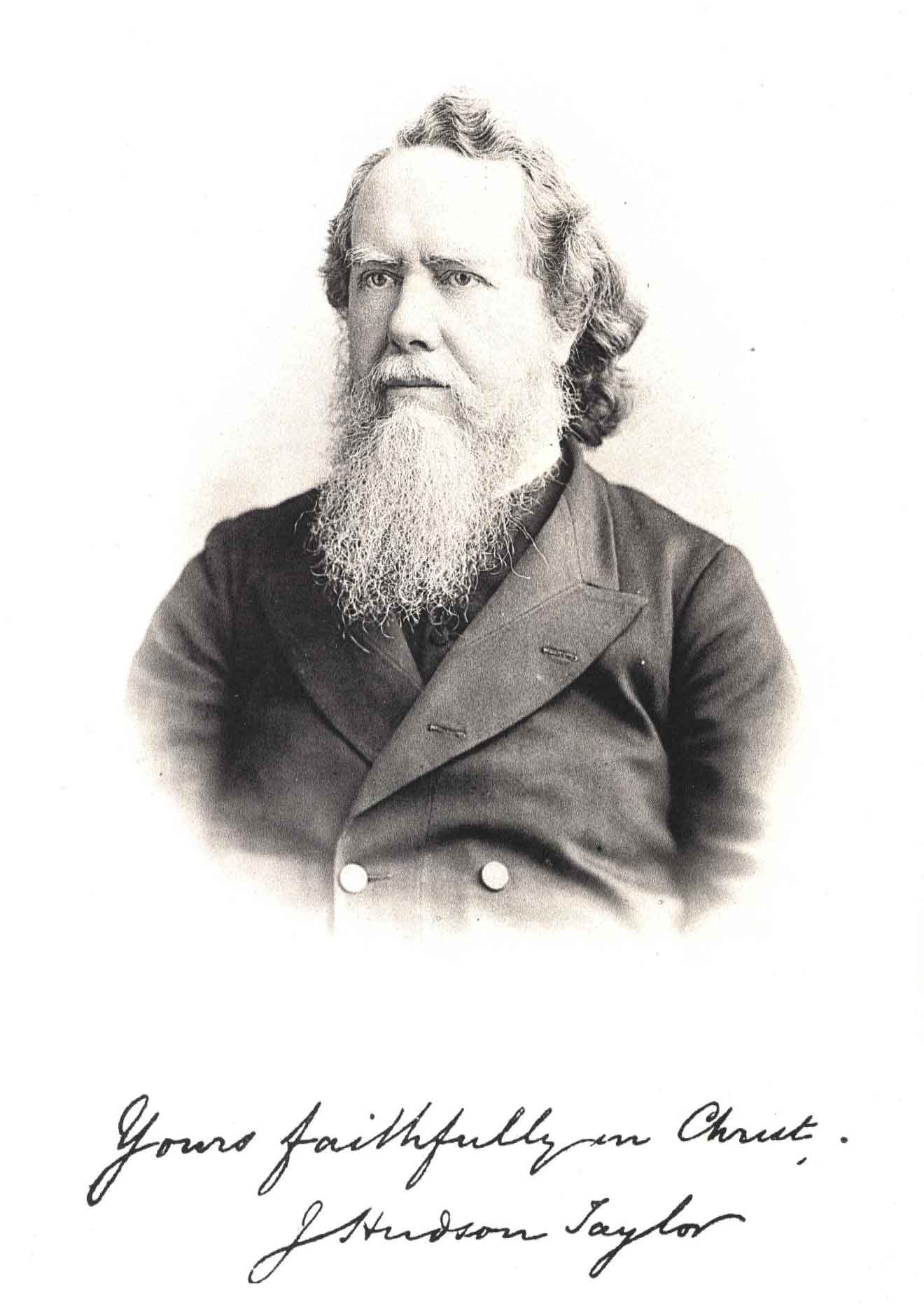
Hudson Taylor (1832–1905), leader of the China Inland Mission

By the early 1860s, the Taiping movement was almost extinct, Protestant missions at the time were confined to five coastal cities. By the end of the century, however, the picture had vastly changed. Scores of new missionary societies had been organized, and several thousand missionaries were working in all parts of China. This transformation can be traced to the unequal treaties which forced the Chinese government to admit Western missionaries into the interior of the country, the excitement caused by the 1859 Great Awakening in Britain. A major role was played by Hudson Taylor (1832–1905). Taylor (Plymouth Brethren) arrived in China in 1854. Historian Kenneth Scott Latourette wrote that Hudson Taylor was "one of the greatest missionaries of all time, and ... one of the four or five most influential foreigners who came to China in the nineteenth century for any purpose."

The China Inland Mission, based in London with a strong appeal to fundamentalist and evangelical Anglicans, was the largest mission agency in China and it is estimated that Taylor was responsible for more people being converted to Christianity than at any other time since the days of the apostles. Out of the 8,500 Protestant missionaries that were at one time at work in China, 1,000 of them were from the China Inland Mission. Dixon Edward Hoste, the successor to Hudson Taylor, originally expressed the self-governing principles of the Three-Self Church, at the time he was articulating the goal of the China Inland Mission to establish an indigenous Chinese Church that was free from foreign control.

==== Social services ====
In imperial-times Chinese social and religious culture, there were charitable organizations for virtually every social service: burial of the dead, care of orphans, provision of food for the hungry. The wealthiest people in every community (typically the merchants) were expected to give food, medicine, clothing, and even cash, to people in need. According to Caroline Reeves, a historian at Emmanuel College in Boston, that began to change with the arrival of American missionaries in the late 19th century. One of the reasons they gave for being there was to help the poor Chinese.

By 1865, when the China Inland Mission began, there were already thirty different Protestant groups at work in China. However, the diversity of denominations represented did not equate to more missionaries on the field. In the seven provinces in which Protestant missionaries had already been working, there were an estimated 204 million people with only 91 workers, while there were eleven other provinces in inland China with a population estimated at 197 million, for which absolutely nothing had been attempted. Besides the London Missionary Society, and the American Board of Commissioners for Foreign Missions, there were missionaries affiliated with Baptists, Presbyterians, Methodists, Episcopalians, and Wesleyans. Most missionaries came from England, the United States, Sweden, France, Germany, Switzerland, or the Netherlands.

==== Secular books ====
In addition to the publication and distribution of Christian literature and Bibles, the Protestant missionary movement in China furthered the dispersion of knowledge with other printed works of history and science. As the missionaries went to work among the Chinese, they established and developed schools and introduced medical techniques from the West. The mission schools were viewed with some suspicion by the traditional Chinese teachers, but they differed from the norm by offering a basic education to poor Chinese, both boys and girls, who had no hope of learning at a school before the days of the Republic of China.

==== Opposition ====
Local affairs in China were under the control of local officials and the land-owning gentry. They led the opposition to missionary work. According to historian Paul Varg:

The Chinese hostility to the missionary was based first of all on the fact that Western Christianity was utterly strange and incomprehensible to the Chinese. There was also the opposition based on what they did understand, namely the missionary's revolutionary program. The literati sensed from the very beginning that Christianization would deprive them of their power. So intense was their hostility that few missionaries considered it worthwhile to make any effort to win them over.

In December 1897, Wilhelm II declared his intent to seize territory in China, which triggered a "scramble for concessions" by which Britain, France, Russia and Japan also secured their own sphere of influence in China. After the German government took over Shandong, many Chinese feared that the foreign missionaries and possibly all Christian activities were imperialist attempts at "carving the melon", i.e., to colonize China piece by piece.

Local gentry published hate literature against the foreign missionaries. One tract featured foreign missionaries praying to crucified pigs—the Catholic term for God was Tianzhu (Heavenly Lord), in which the Chinese character "zhu" had the same pronunciation as the word for "pig". The pamphlet also showed Christian clergy engaging in orgies following Sunday services and removing the placentas, breasts, and testicles from kidnapped Chinese. It concluded with repeated calls for their extermination by vigilantes and the government.

The Boxer Rebellion was in large part a reaction against Christianity in China. Missionaries were harassed and murdered, along with tens of thousands of converts. In 1895, the Manchu Yuxian, a magistrate in the province, acquired the help of the Big Swords Society in fighting against bandits. The Big Swords practices heterodox practices, however, they were not bandits and were not seen as bandits by Chinese authorities. The Big Swords relentlessly crushed the bandits, but the bandits converted to the Catholic Church, because it made them legally immune to prosecution under the protection of the foreigners. The Big Swords proceeded to attack the bandits' Catholic churches and burn them. Yuxian only executed several Big Sword leaders, but did not punish anyone else. More secret societies started emerging after this.

In Pingyuan, the site of another insurrection and major religious disputes, the county magistrate noted that Chinese converts to Christianity were taking advantage of their bishop's power to file false lawsuits which, upon investigation, were found groundless.

French Catholic missionaries were active in China; they were funded by appeals in French churches for money. The Holy Childhood Association (L'Oeuvre de la Sainte Enfance) was a Catholic charity founded in 1843 to rescue Chinese children from infanticide. It was a target of Chinese anti-Christian protests notably in the Tianjin Massacre of 1870. Rioting sparked by false rumors of the killing of babies led to the death of a French consul and provoked a diplomatic crisis.

==== Popularity and indigenous growth (1900–1925) ====
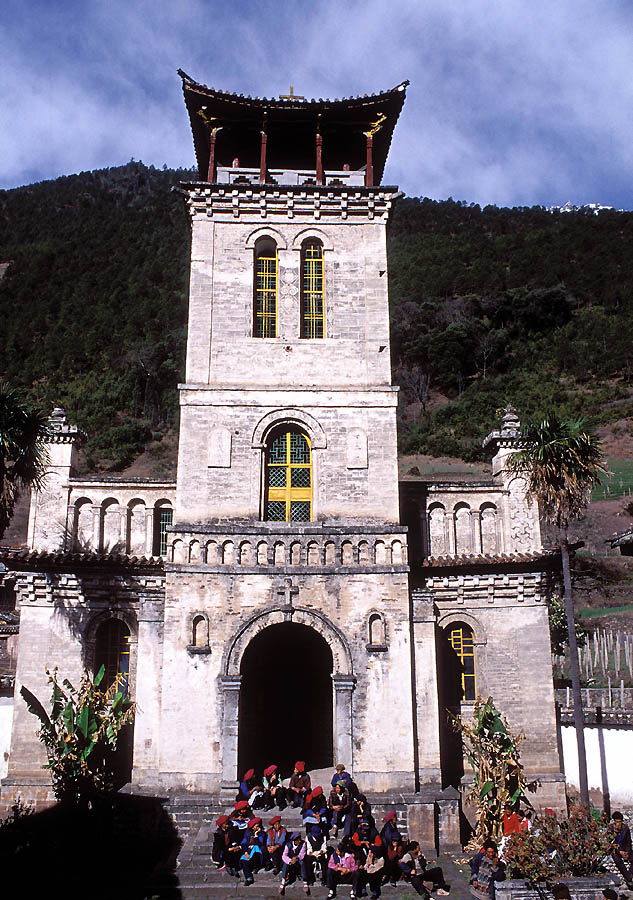
A Catholic church by the Lancang River River at Cizhong, Yunnan. It was built by French missionaries in the mid-19th century, but was burnt during the anti-foreigner movement in 1905 and rebuilt in the 1920s. The congregation is mainly Tibetan, but some members are of Han, Naxi, Lisu, Yi, Bai and Hui ethnicity.

Many scholars see the historical period between the Boxer Uprising and the Second Sino-Japanese War as a golden age of Chinese Christianity, as converts grew rapidly and churches were built in many regions of China. Paul Varg argues that American missionaries worked very hard on changing China:

The growth of the missionary movement in the first decades of the [20th] century wove a tie between the American church-going public and China that did not exist between the United States and any other country. The number of missionaries increased from 513 in 1890 to more than 2,000 in 1914, and by 1920 there were 8,325 Protestant missionaries in China. In 1927 there were sixteen American universities and colleges, ten professional schools of collegiate rank, four schools of theology, and six schools of medicine. These institutions represented an investment of $19 million. By 1920, 265 Christian middle schools existed with an enrollment of 15,213. There were thousands of elementary schools; the Presbyterians alone had 383 primary schools with about 15,000 students.

Extensive fund-raising and publicity campaigns were held across the U.S. The Catholics in the United States also supported large mission operations in China.

Following the 1910 World Missionary Conference in Glasgow, Protestant missionaries energetically promoted what they called "indigenization", that is assigning the leadership of churches to local Christian leaders. The Chinese National YMCA was the first to do so. In the 1920s, a group of church leaders formed the National Christian Council of China to coordinate interdenominational activity. Among the leaders were Cheng Jingyi, who was influential at the Glasgow Conference with his call for a non-denominational church. The way was prepared for the creation of the Church of Christ in China, a unified non-denominational church.

After World War I, the New Culture Movement fostered an intellectual atmosphere that promoted Science and Democracy. Although some of the movement's leaders, such as Chen Duxiu, initially expressed admiration for the role that Christianity played in building the strong nations of the West, as well as approving the emphasis on love and social service, Christianity became identified in the eyes of many young Chinese with foreign control of China. The 1923 Anti-Christian Movement attacked missionaries and their followers on the grounds that no religion was scientific and that the Christian church in China was a tool of the foreigners. Such Chinese Protestants as the liberals David Z. T. Yui, head of the Chinese National YMCA, and Y. T. Wu, Wu Leichuan, T. C. Chao, and the theologically more conservative Chen Chonggui responded by developing social programs and theologies that devoted themselves to strengthening the Chinese nation. Y. C. James Yen, a graduate of Yale University, led a program of village reform.

During the May Fourth Movement, Chinese intellectuals and students criticized Christianity for its associations with Western imperialism. Responding to these perspectives, some Chinese Protestant leaders began indigenous church movements seeking to establish Protestant churches in China that were independent of foreign financials, control, or leadership. Among these developments in the post-May Fourth environment was the Local Church movement led by Watchman Nee (Ni Tuosheng).

Several political leaders of the Republican period were Protestant Christians, including Sun Yat-sen, Chiang Kai-shek, Feng Yuxiang, and Wang Zhengting. Leading writers include Lin Yutang, who renounced his Christianity for several decades. His journey of faith from Christianity to Taoism and Buddhism, and back to Christianity in his later life was recorded in his book From Pagan to Christian (1959). Lottie Moon (1840–1912), representing the Southern Baptist, was the most prominent woman missionary. Although an equality-oriented feminist who rejected male dominance, the Southern Baptists have memorialized her as a southern belle who followed traditional gender roles.

Since the Republican era, a trend among Chinese theologians has been to indigenise the divinity of Jesus Christ by bringing Biblical teachings in line with the Confucian tradition.

==== Medical missions ====
Medical missions in China by the late 19th century laid the foundations for modern medicine in China. Western medical missionaries established the first modern clinics and hospitals, provided the first training for nurses, and opened the first medical schools in China. By 1901, China was the most popular destination for medical missionaries. The 150 foreign physicians operated 128 hospitals and 245 dispensaries, treating 1.7 million patients. In 1894, male medical missionaries constituted 14 percent of all missionaries; women doctors were four percent. Modern medical education in China started in the early 20th century at hospitals run by international missionaries. They began establishing nurse training schools in China in the late 1880s, but nursing of sick men by female nurses was rejected by local traditions, so the number of Chinese students was small until the practice became accepted in the 1930s. There was also a level of distrust on the part of traditional evangelical missionaries who thought hospitals were diverting needed resources away from the primary goal of conversions.

Of the 500 hospitals in China in 1931, 235 were run by Protestant missions and 10 by Catholic missions. The mission hospitals produce 61 percent of Western trained doctors, 32 percent nurses and 50 percent of medical schools. Already by 1923 China had half of the world's missionary hospital beds and half the world's missionary doctors.

Due to the essential non-existence of Chinese doctors of Western medicine in China and Hong Kong, the founding of colleges of Western medicine was an important part of the medical mission. These colleges for the training of male and female doctors were separately founded. The training of female doctors was particularly necessary, due to the reluctance of Chinese women to see male doctors.

The Hong Kong College of Medicine for Chinese was founded in Hong Kong by the London Missionary Society in 1887 for the training of male doctors. Sun Yat-sen the first graduate of this college and the founder of modern China, graduated in 1892. Hong Kui Wong (黄康衢) (1876–1961) graduated in 1900 and then moved to Singapore, where he supported the Xinhai Revolution led by Sun Yat-sen.

The Hackett Medical College for Women, the first medical college for women in China, and its affiliated hospital known as David Gregg Hospital for Women and Children (柔濟醫院), located together in Guangzhou, China, were founded by female medical missionary Mary H. Fulton (1854–1927). Fulton was sent by the Foreign Missions Board of the Presbyterian Church (USA), with the support of the Lafayette Avenue Presbyterian Church of Brooklyn, New York, of which David Gregg was pastor. The college was dedicated in 1902 and offered a four-year medical curriculum. Its graduates include Lee Sun Chau.

==== Indigenous Christian leaders ====
Indigenous Christian evangelism started in China in the late 1800s. Man-Kai Wan (1869–1927) was one of the first Chinese doctors of Western medicine in Hong Kong, the inaugural chairman of the Hong Kong Chinese Medical Association (1920–1922, forerunner of the Hong Kong Medical Association), and a secondary school classmate of Sun Yat-sen in the Government Central College (currently known as Queen's College) in Hong Kong. Wan and Sun graduated from secondary school around 1886. Doctor Wan was also the chairman of the board of a Christian newspaper called Great Light Newspaper (大光報) that was distributed in Hong Kong and China. Sun and Wan practiced Western Medicine together in a joint clinic. The father-in-law of Wan was Au Fung-Chi (1847–1914), the secretary of the Hong Kong Department of Chinese Affairs, manager of Kwong Wah Hospital for its 1911 opening, and an elder of To Tsai Church (renamed Hop Yat Church since 1926), which was founded by the London Missionary Society in 1888 and was the church of Sun Yat-sen.

=== National and social change: the war against Japan and the Chinese Civil War (1925–1949) ===
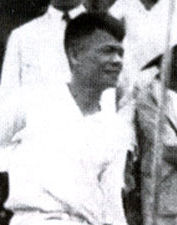
John Sung

During World War II, China was devastated by the Second Sino-Japanese War which countered a Japanese invasion, and by the Chinese Civil War which resulted in the separation of Taiwan from mainland China. In this period the Chinese Christian churches and organizations had their first experience with autonomy from the Western structures of the missionary church organizations. Some scholars suggest this helped lay the foundation for the independent denominations and churches of the post-war period and the eventual development of the Three-Self Church and the Catholic Patriotic Church. At the same time the intense war period hampered the rebuilding and development of the churches.

=== Since 1949 ===
The People's Republic of China (PRC) was declared 1 October 1949 by the Chinese Communist Party (CCP) led by Chairman Mao Zedong, while the Republic of China led by the Kuomintang maintained its government on Taiwan. The historian Daniel Bays comments that it was "not surprising that this new government, like the emperors of several dynasties of the last millennium, evinced an insistence on monitoring religious life and requiring all religions, for example, to register their venues and leadership personnel with a government office." Christian missionaries left in what was described by Phyllis Thompson of the China Inland Mission as a "reluctant exodus".

The Chinese Protestant church entered the communist era having made significant progress toward self-support and self-government. While the Chinese Communist Party was hostile to religion in general, it did not seek to systematically destroy religion as long as the religious organizations were willing to submit to the direction of the Chinese state. Many Protestants were willing to accept such accommodation and were permitted to continue religious life in China under the name "Three-Self Patriotic Movement". Catholics, on the other hand, with their allegiance to the Holy See, could not submit to the Chinese state as their Protestant counterparts did, notwithstanding the willingness of the Vatican to compromise in order to remain in mainland China—the papal nuncio in China did not withdraw to Taiwan like other western diplomats. Consequently, the Chinese state organized the Catholic Patriotic Church that operates without connection to the Vatican, and the Catholics who continued to acknowledge the authority of the Pope were subject to persecution.

During the Korean War, the United States froze all Chinese assets in the United States and banned the transfer of funds from the United States to within the PRC. Among the effects of these policies was cutting off funding for American-affiliated cultural institutions in China, including Christian colleges and religious institutions. The PRC responded by nationalizing American-affiliated cultural institutions, including religious ones.

During the Cultural Revolution, believers were arrested and imprisoned and sometimes tortured for their faith. Bibles were destroyed, churches and homes were looted, and Christians were subjected to humiliation.

==== After the Cultural Revolution ====
Religions in China began to recover after the reform and opening up of the 1970s. Beginning in 1978, Deng Xiaoping relaxed policies on the Protestant churches. In 1979, the government officially restored the Three-Self Church after thirteen years of non-existence, and in 1980, the China Christian Council (CCC) was formed. In the 1980s, the number of Protestants in rural China increased rapidly. The number of urban Protestants increased rapidly in the 1990s.

Several thousand Christians were known to have been imprisoned between 1983 and 1993. In 1992, the government began a campaign to shut-down all of the unregistered meetings. However, government implementation of restrictions since then has varied widely between regions of China, and in many areas there is greater religious liberty.

The members of the underground Catholic Church in China, those who do not belong to the official Catholic Patriotic Church and are faithful to the Vatican, remain theoretically subject to persecution today. In practice, however, the Vatican and the Chinese State have been, at least unofficially, accommodating each other for some time. While some bishops who joined the Catholic Patriotic Church in its early years have been condemned and even excommunicated, the entire organization has never been declared schismatic by the Vatican and, at present, its bishops are even invited to church synods like other Catholic leaders. Also, many underground clergy and laymen are active in the official Patriotic Church as well. Still, there are periods of discomfort between Vatican and the Patriotic Church: Pope Benedict XVI condemned the Patriotic Catholic leaders as "persons who are not ordained, and sometimes not even baptised", who "control and make decisions concerning important ecclesial questions, including the appointment of bishops". The Chinese state indeed continues to appoint bishops and intervene in the church's policy (most notably on abortion and artificial contraception) without consulting the Vatican and punishing outspoken dissenters. In one notable case that drew international attention, Thaddeus Ma Daqin, the auxiliary bishop of Shanghai, who both the Vatican and Chinese state agreed as the successor to the elderly Aloysius Jin Luxian, the Patriotic Catholic bishop of Shanghai (who the Vatican also recognized as the coadjutor bishop), was arrested and imprisoned after publicly resigning from his positions in the Patriotic Church in 2012, an act which was considered a challenge to the state control over the Catholic Church in China.

A Christian spiritual revival has grown in the first decades of the twenty-first century. The Communist Party remains officially atheist, and has remained intolerant of churches outside party control. Christianity has grown rapidly, reaching 67 million people, including those in unofficial churches. In recent years, however, the Communist Party has looked with distrust on organizations with international ties; it tends to associate Christianity with what it deems to be subversive Western values, and has closed churches and schools. In 2015, outspoken pastors in Hong Kong and their associates on the mainland came under close scrutiny from government officials.

=== Contemporary People's Republic of China ===
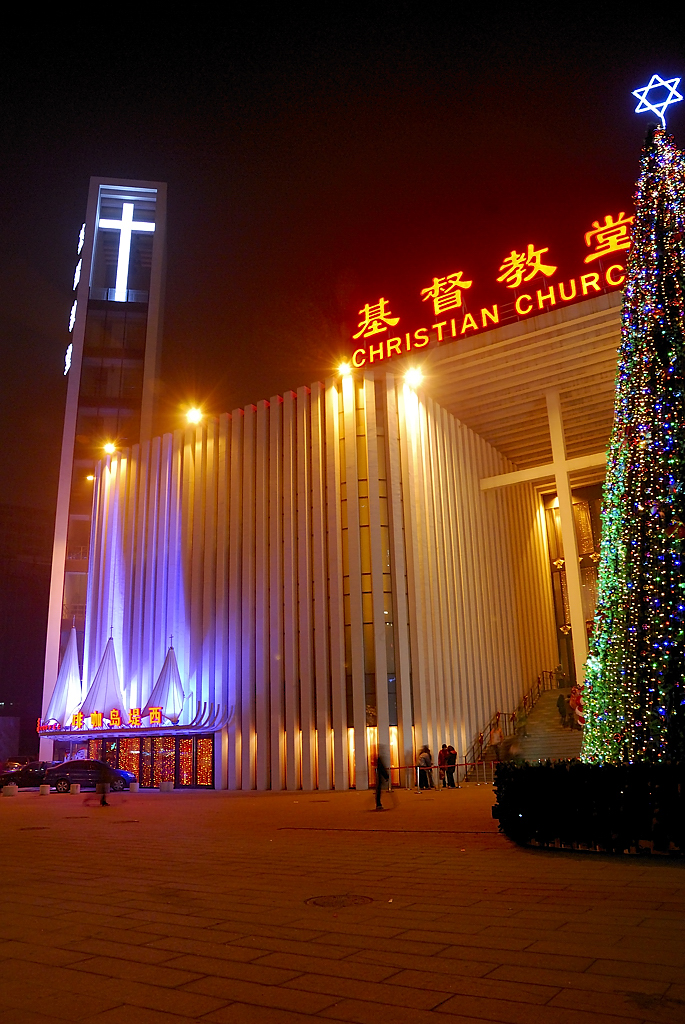
Haidian Christian Church during Christmas 2007, Beijing. Haidian Church is operated by Three-Self Patriotic Movement.

==== Subdivision of the Christian community ====
===== Official organizations—the Chinese Patriotic Catholic Church and the Chinese Protestant Church =====
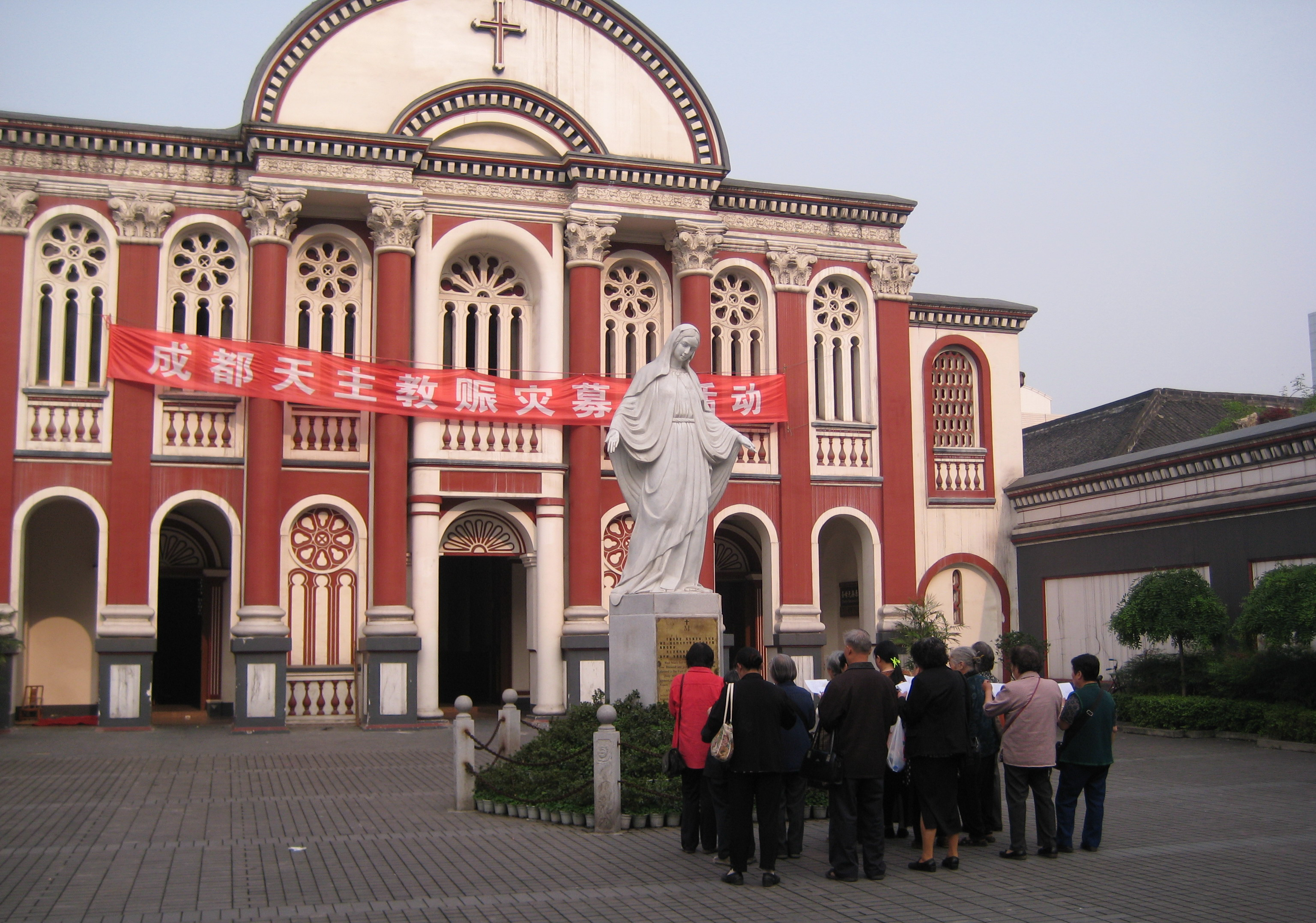
Virgin Mary Statue in the Chengdu Green Bridge Church, Sichuan.

The Chinese Catholic Patriotic Association and the Protestant Three-Self Patriotic Movement are centralised and government-sanctioned Christian institutions which regulate all local Christian gatherings, all of which are required to be registered under their auspices.

===== Unregistered churches =====
Many Christians hold meetings outside of the jurisdiction of the government-approved organizations and avoid registration with the government and are often illegal. While there has been continuous persecution of Chinese Christians throughout the twentieth century, particularly during the Cultural Revolution, there has been increasing tolerance of unregistered churches since the late 1970s.

Catholic groups are usually known as underground churches and Protestant groups are usually known as house churches. The Catholic underground churches are those congregations who remain fully faithful to the Pope in Rome and refuse to register as part of the Catholic Patriotic Church. Much of the Protestant house church movement dates back to the coerced unification of all Protestant denominations in the Three-Self Church in 1958. There is often significant overlap between the membership of registered and unregistered Christian bodies, as a large number of people attend both registered and unregistered churches.

Local authorities continued to harass and detain bishops, including Guo Xijin and Cui Tai, who refused to join the state-affiliated Catholic association. Chinese authorities raided or closed down hundreds of Protestant house churches in 2019, including Rock Church in Henan Province and Shouwang Church and Zion Church in Beijing, with their pastor, Jin Tianming and Jin Mingri under house arrest. The government released some of the Early Rain Covenant Church congregants who had been arrested in December 2018, but in December 2019 a court charged Pastor Wang Yi with "subversion of state power" and sentenced him to nine years imprisonment. Several local governments, including Guangzho city, offered cash bounties for individuals who informed on underground churches. In addition, the authority of religious affairs has removed crosses from churches, banned youth under the age of 18 from participating in religious services, and replaced images of Jesus Christ or Virgin Mary with pictures of General Secretary of the Chinese Communist Party Xi Jinping.

===== Chinese Independent Churches =====
The Chinese Independent Churches are a group of Christian institutions that are independent from Western denominations. They were established in China in the late 19th and early 20th century, including both the Little Flock or Church Assembly Hall and True Jesus Church. In the 1940s they gathered 200,000 adherents, which was 20% to 25% of the total Christian population of that time.

Miller (2006) explains that a significant amount of the house churches or unregistered congregations and meeting points of the Protestant spectrum, that refuse to join the Three-Self Church—China Christian Council, belong to the Chinese Independent Churches. Congregations of the Little Flock or the True Jesus Church tend to be uncooperative towards the Three-Self Church as to their principle it represents not only a tool of the government but also a different Christian tradition.

The trend in the post-Mao era has been that Protestant churches in China have become more local, more independent, and less tied to denominational structures than was historically the case in China.

===== Chinese Orthodox Church =====
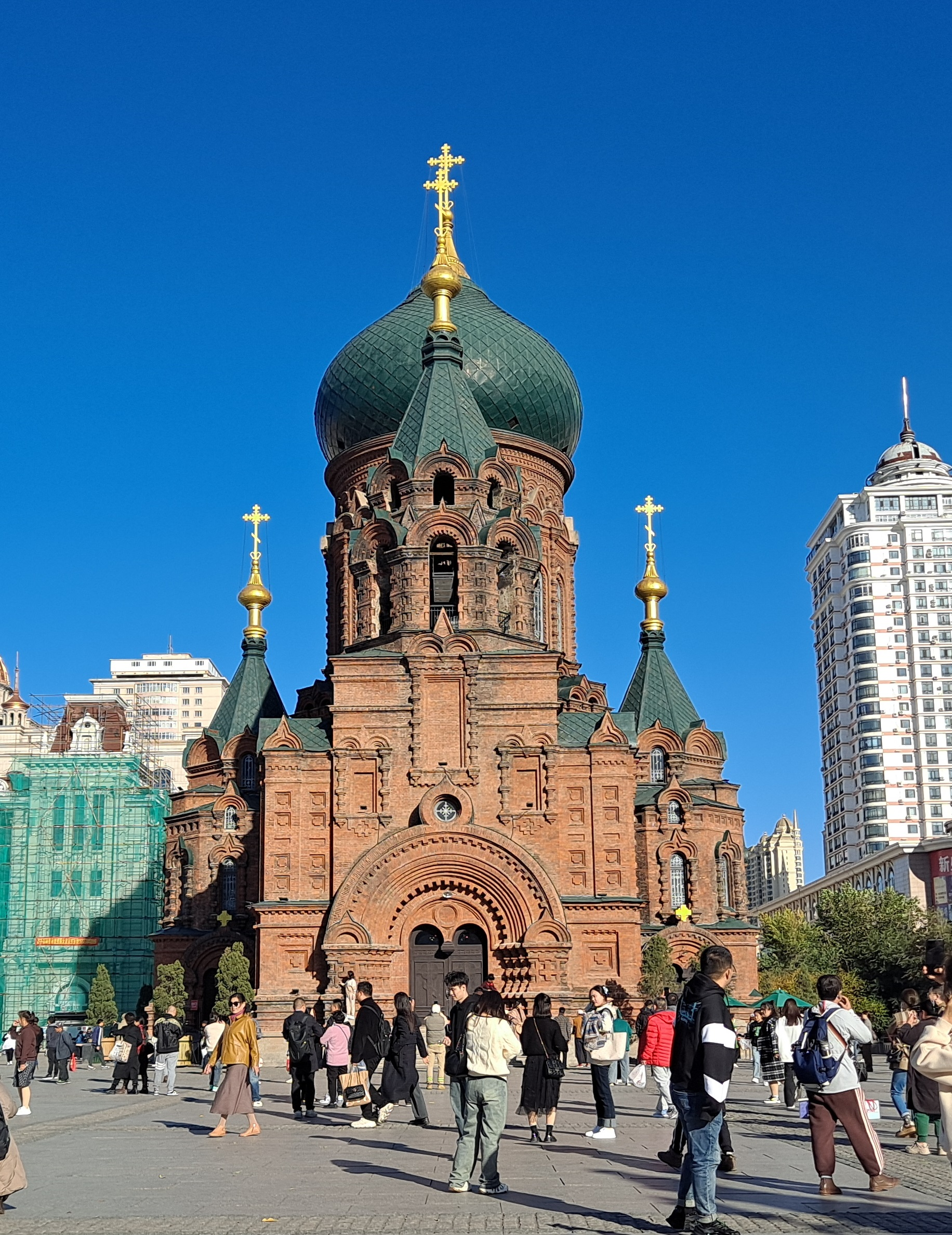
Saint Sophia Cathedral in Harbin.

There are a small number of adherents of Russian Orthodoxy in northern China, predominantly in Harbin. The first mission was undertaken by Russians in the 17th century. Orthodox Christianity is also practiced by the small Russian minority in China. The Church operates relatively freely in Hong Kong (where the Ecumenical Patriarch has sent a metropolitan, Bishop Nikitas and the Russian Orthodox parish of St Peter and St Paul resumed its operation) and Taiwan (where archimandrite Jonah George Mourtos leads a mission church).

===== Korean Christianity =====
Chinese scholars of religion have reported that a large portion of the members of the networks of house or unregistered churches, and of their pastors, are Koreans living in China. The pastors of the independent Shouwang and Zion churches in Beijing are noted for having been prosecuted by the government, and are of Korean ethnicity. The Korean-Chinese pastors have a disproportional influence on the underground Christianity in China. Christianity has been an influential religion among the Korean people since the 19th century, and it has become the largest religion in South Korea after the division of Korea in 1945. Christianity also has a strong presence in the Yanbian Korean Autonomous Prefecture, in the Jilin province of China.

The Christianity of Yanbian Koreans has a patriarchal character; Korean churches are usually led by men, in contrast to Chinese churches which more often have female leadership. For instance, of the 28 registered churches of Yanji, only three of which are Chinese congregations, all the Korean churches have a male pastor while all the Chinese churches have a female pastor. Also, Yanbian Korean church buildings are stylistically very similar to South Korean churches, with big spires surmounted by large red crosses. Yanbian Korean churches and house churches in China have been a matter of controversy for the Chinese government because of their links to South Korean churches. Many of the Korean house churches in China receive financial support and pastoral ordinations from South Korean churches, and some of them are effectively branches of South Korean churches. South Korean missionaries have major influence not only on Korean-Chinese churches but also the Han Chinese churches in mainland China.

===== Heterodox sects =====
In China there are also a variety of Christian sects based on biblical teachings that are considered by the government as "heterodox teachings" (邪教; xiéjiào) or cults, including the Eastern Lightning and the Shouters. They primarily operate in a form similar to the "house churches", small worship groups, outside of the state-sanctioned Three-Self Church, that meet in members' homes. One feature that some Christian sects with this label have in common is particular emphasis on the authority of a single leader, sometimes even those claiming to be Jesus. In the mid-1990s, the Chinese government started to monitor these new religious movements, and officially prohibited them, with their activities moving underground.

==== Religious venues and practice ====
As of 2012 in China Catholicism has 6,300 churches, 116 active dioceses of which 97 under the Catholic Patriotic Church, 74 Chinese Patriotic bishops and 40 Catholic unofficial bishops, 2,150 Chinese Patriotic priests and 1,500 Catholic priests, 22 major and minor Chinese Patriotic seminaries and 10 Catholic unofficial seminaries. In the same year, there are 53,000 Three-Self churches and meeting places and 21 Three-Self theological seminaries.

In 2010, The Church of Jesus Christ of Later-day Saints revealed its on-going efforts to negotiate with authorities to regularize its activities in the country. The church has had expatriate members worshiping in China for a few decades previous to this, but with restrictions. On 31 March 2020, during its general conference, the church announced its intent to build a temple in Shanghai as a "modest multipurpose meetinghouse." However, the Shanghai Municipal Ethnic and Religious Affairs Bureau said twice it knew nothing about these plans to build a temple, remarking that these plans were "wishful thinking, not based in reality." In 2024, an article from the Church showed that the Shanghai location had been omitted from the list of temples Church President Russell M. Nelson had announced.

==== Other movements ====
The Sino-Christian theology movement promotes a contextual-historicist approach to Christianity in China. This movement was strongly influenced by the 1990s writings of Liu Xiaofeng.

Cultural Christians in China include intellectuals who participate in the study of Christian culture and its application to China but who do not have specific church associations.

== Demographics and geography ==
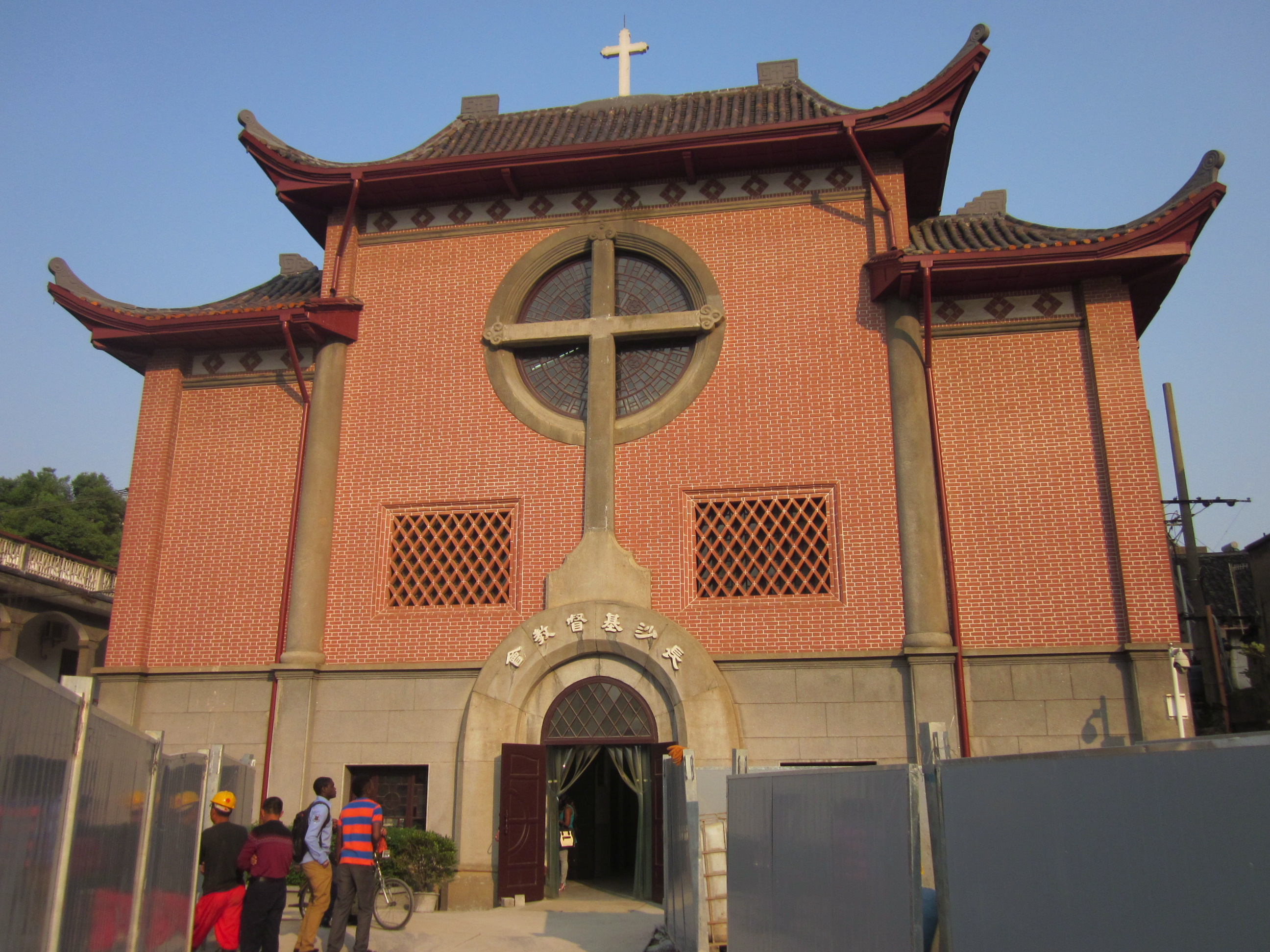
The Changsha Church Christianity in Kaifu District, Hunan.

=== Mainland China ===
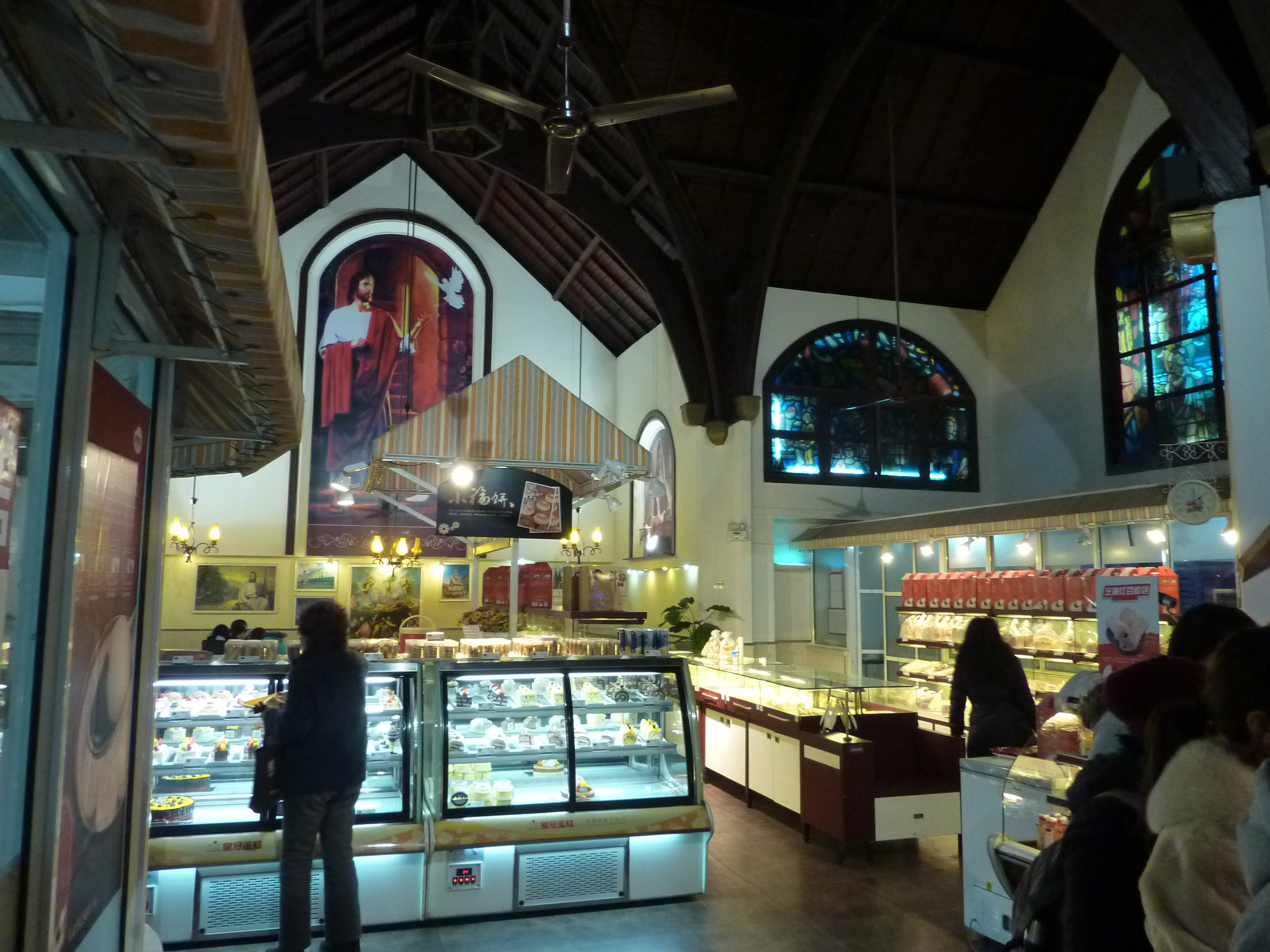
The interior of a former Methodist church in Wuhan, converted to an upscale pastry shop with a Christian-themed decor

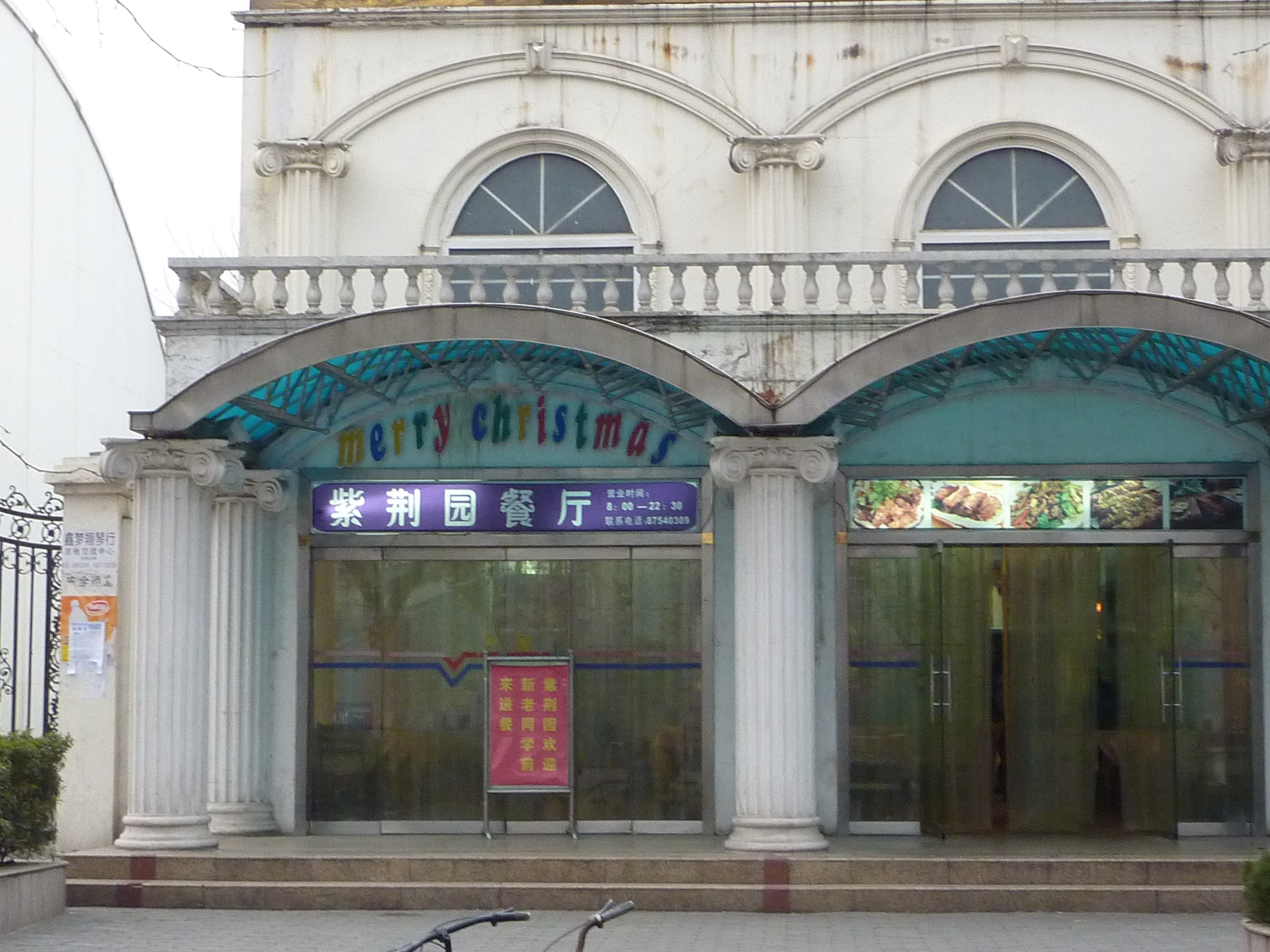
"Merry Christmas" signs (usually only in English) are common in China during the winter holiday season, even in areas with little sign of Christian observance

Although a number of factors—the vast Chinese population and the characteristic Chinese approach to religion among others—contribute to a difficulty to obtain empirical data on the number of Christians in China, a series of surveys have been conducted and published by different agencies. Government figures only count adult baptized members of government sanctioned churches. Thus they generally do not include un-baptized persons attending Christian groups, non-adult children of Christian believers or other persons under age 18 and they generally do not take into account unregistered Christian groups. There is often significant overlap between the membership of registered and unregistered Christian bodies, as a large number of people attend both registered and unregistered churches.

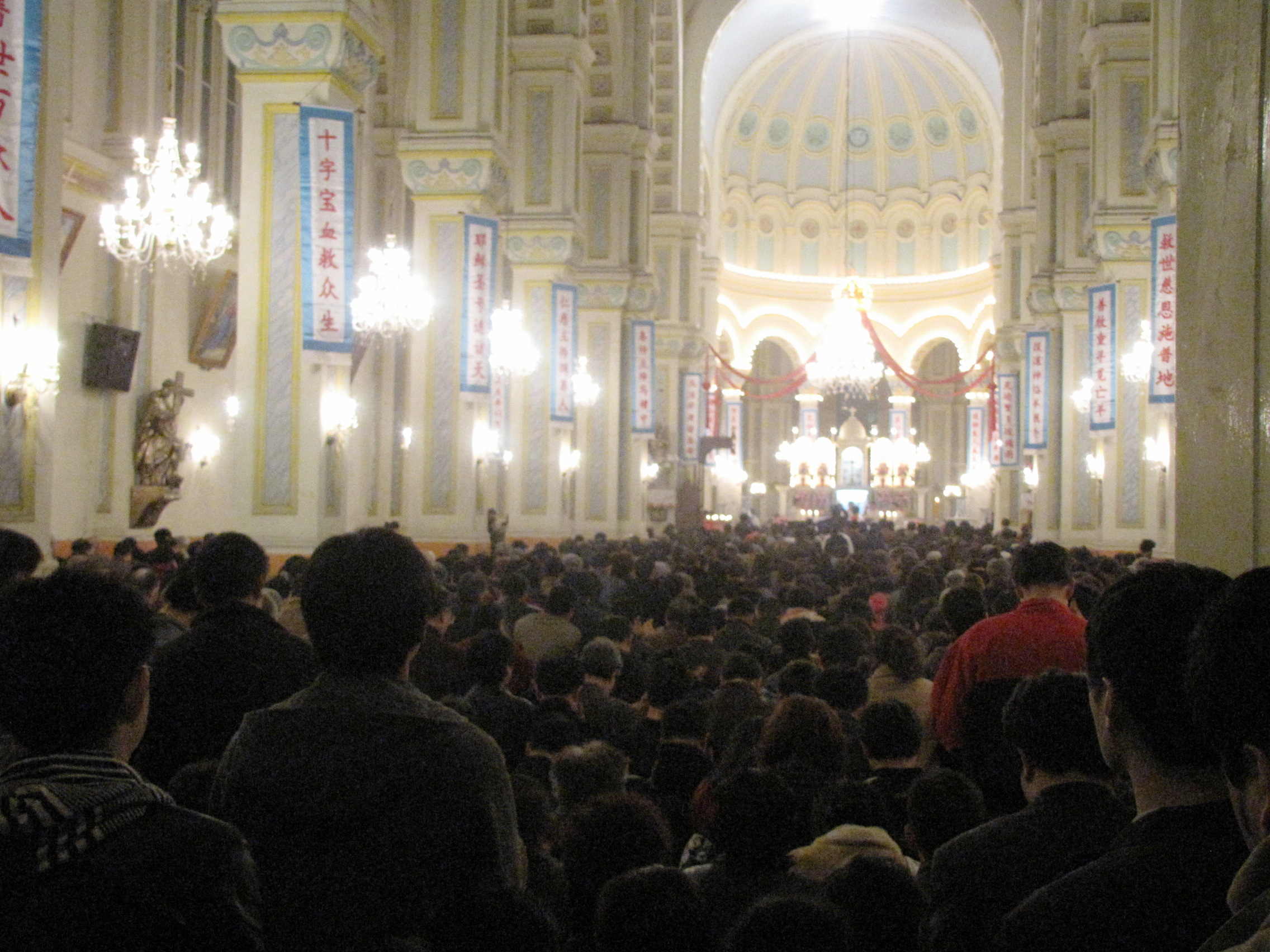
St. Joseph Cathedral in Tianjin

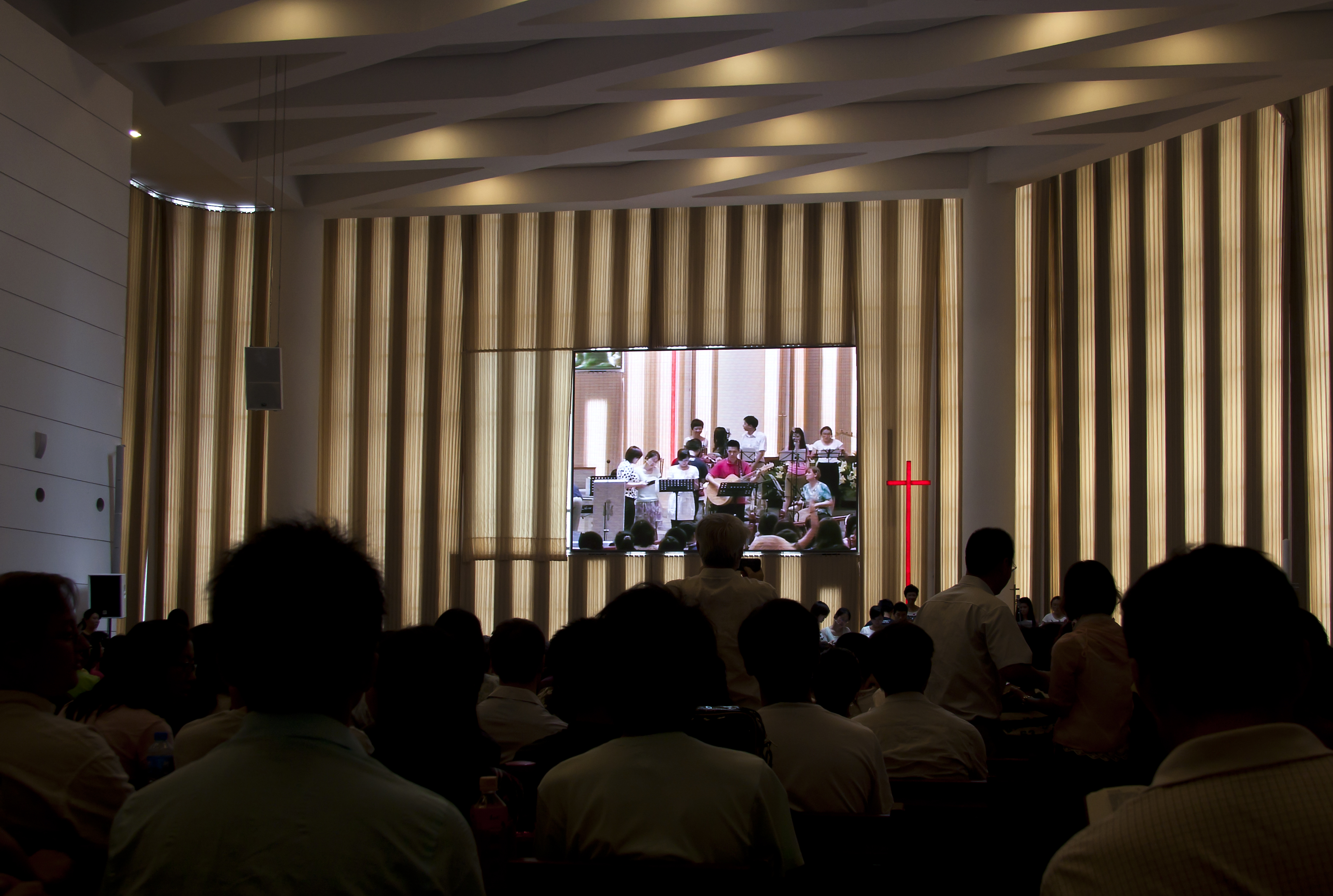
Inside Haidian Christian Church in Beijing

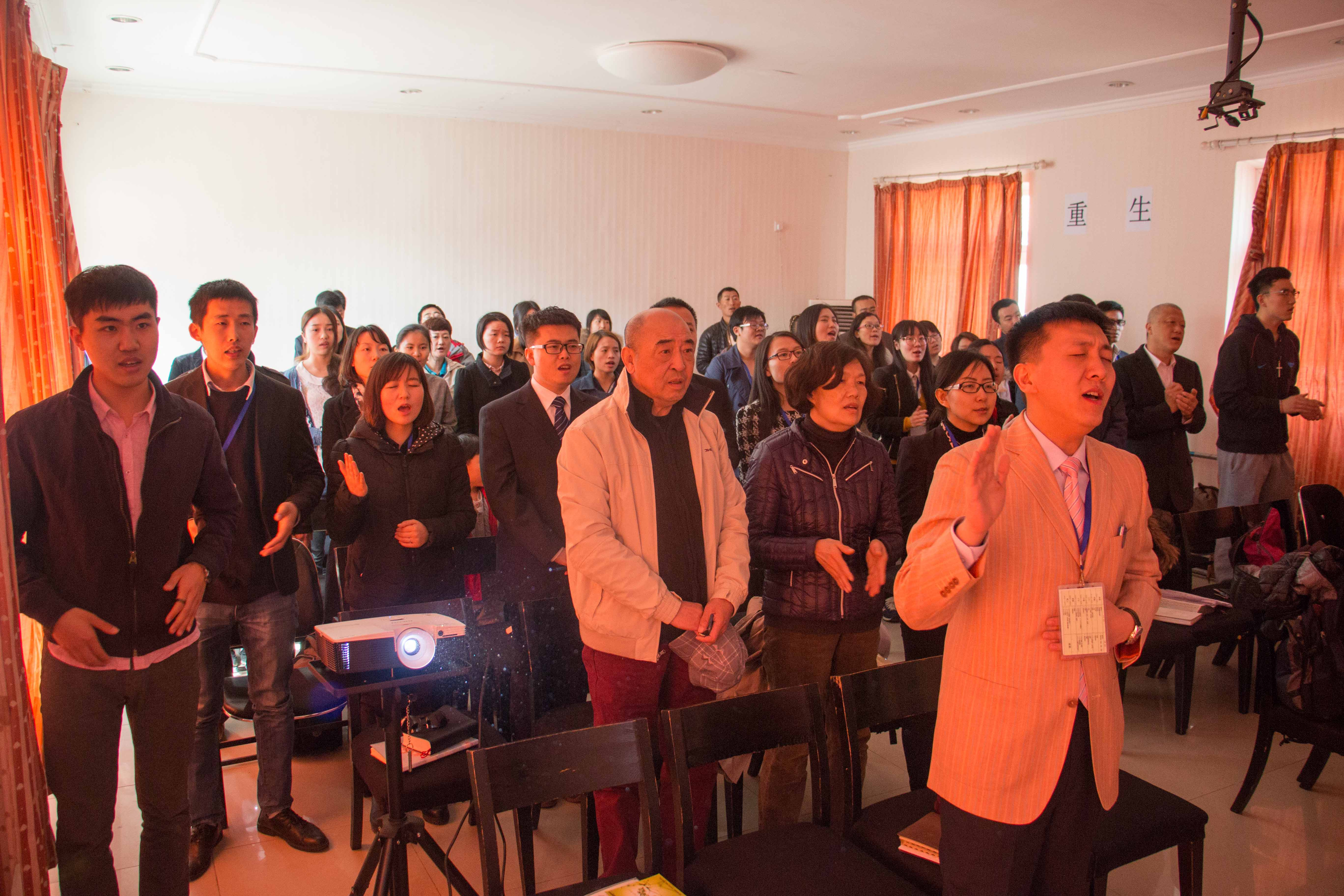
A house church in Shunyi, Beijing

Official membership

As of 2023, there are approximately 44 million Chinese Christians registered with government-approved Christian groups. This number is reconfirmed in 2026.

- The Three-Self Church had a membership of 20 million people as of 2012.
- The Catholic Patriotic Church had a membership of 6 million people as of 2012.

==== Independent surveys ====
- 2005/2006/2007: three surveys of religions in China conducted in those years by the Horizon Research Consultancy Group on a disproportionately urban and suburban sampling, found that Christians constituted between 2% and 4% of the total population.
- 2007: three surveys were conducted that year to count the number of Christians in China. One of them was conducted by the Protestant missionary Werner Bürklin, founder of "China Partner", an international Christian organisation, and his team of 7,409 surveyors in every province and municipality of China. The other survey was conducted by professor Liu Zhongyu of the East China Normal University of Shanghai. The surveys were conducted independently and along different periods of time, but they reached the same results. According to the analyses, there were approximately 54 million Christians in China (≈4% of the total population), of whom 39 million were Protestants and 14 million were Catholics. And the third survey, "Spiritual Life Study of Chinese Residents (SLSC)" was conducted in May and June 2007. The project was funded by John Templeton Foundation and co-led by scholars from Baylor University, Peking University, Princeton University, Purdue University, and Taiwan National University, and Horizon Key Research in Beijing China. The SLSC estimated 33 million Christians (≈2% of the total population), of whom 30 million Protestants and 3 million Catholics.
- 2008: a survey of religions conducted in that year by Yu Tao of the University of Oxford with a survey scheme led and supervised by the Center for Chinese Agricultural Policy (CCAP) and the Peking University, analysing the rural populations of the six provinces of Jiangsu, Sichuan, Shaanxi, Jilin, Hebei and Fujian, each representing different geographic and economic regions of China, found that Christians constituted approximately 4% of the population, of whom 3.54% were Protestants and 0.49% were Catholics.
- 2008–2009: a household survey conducted by the Chinese Academy of Social Sciences (CASS) counted 23 million Protestants (independent and registered) in China.
- 2011: a survey conducted by the Baylor's Empirical Study of Values in China (ESVC) found 2.5% (≈30 to 40 million) of the population of China self-identifying as Christian.
- 2012: a survey conducted by the China Family Panel Studies (CFPS) institute, found Christians forming 2.4% of the population of Han China, or between 30 and 40 million people in absolute numbers. Of these, 1.9% were Protestants and 0.4% were Catholics.
- Surveys on religion in China conducted in the years 2006, 2008, 2010 and 2011 by the Chinese General Social Survey (CGSS) of the Renmin University found that people self-identifying as Christians were, respectively for each year, 2.1%, 2.2%, 2.1% and 2.6% of the total population.
- 2018: the (CGSS) found that about 2% of adults, roughly 20 million people, identified as Christian, about 90% of them Protestant. The China Family Panel Studies found that about 7.3% of adults believed in Jesus Christ or Tianzhu, but only 2.7% held Christian beliefs exclusively, without belief in other deities.
- 2021: the CGSS found that 1.4% of adults identified as Christian, but this wave covered fewer regions and was conducted during a COVID-19 surge, so it is not directly comparable with earlier waves.

==== Estimates ====
- 2010: the Pew Forum on Religion & Public Life estimated over 67 million Christians in China, of which 35 million "independent" Protestants, 23 million Three-Self Protestants, 9 million Catholics and 20,000 Orthodox Christians.
- 2014: scholars at a conference for the 60th anniversary of the Three-Self Church showed that China has about 23 million to 40 million Protestants, 1.7% to 2.9% of the total population. Each year, about 500,000 people are baptized as Protestants.

Protestants concentrate mainly in three regions: Henan, Anhui, and Zhejiang. In these provinces, the Christian population is in the millions, yet small in percentage. For example, in Zhejiang, 2.8% of the population is officially Protestant as of 1999, higher than the national average. In Wenzhou, a city of Zhejiang, about one million people (approximately 11%) are Christians, the highest concentration in one city. The Protestant population consists predominantly of illiterate or semi-illiterate people, elderly people, and women. These characteristics are confirmed by the findings of the Yu Tao survey of 2008, which also found that Protestantism has the lowest proportion of believers who are at the same time members of the CCP in comparison to other religions, and by the China Family Panel Studies' survey of 2012.

The province of Hebei has a concentration of Catholics, and is also home to the town of Donglu, which is the site of an alleged Marian apparition, and is therefore a pilgrimage-center. According to the Yu Tao survey of 2008, the Catholic population, though much smaller than that of the Protestants, is nevertheless younger, wealthier, and better-educated. That survey also found that Christianity overall has a higher proportion of ethnic minority believers than the other religions.

Controversy exists regarding the veracity of estimates published by some sources. For example, Gerda Wielander (2013) has claimed that estimates of the number of Christians in China that have been spread by Western media may have been highly inflated. For instance, according to Asia Harvest, a US non-profit organization and "inter-denominational Christian ministry", there were 105 millions Christians in China in 2011. The compiler of these figures, Paul Hattaway, indicates that his figures are his own estimate, based on more than 2,000 published sources such as Internet reports, journals, and books, as well as interviews with house church leaders. The study points out that "owing to the difficulties of conducting such a [study] in China today – not the least of which is the sheer size of the country – there is [in the study's rough estimation] a margin of error of 20 percent." Citing one of the aforementioned surveys, Gerda Wielander says that the actual number of Christians is around 30 million. Similarly, missionary researcher Tony Lambert has highlighted that an estimate of "one hundred million Chinese Christians" was already being spread by American Christian media in 1983, and has been further exaggerated, through a chain of misquotations, in the 2000s. Christopher Marsh (2011) too has been critical of these overestimations. A 2025 study of 19 nationally representative surveys conducted since the early 2000s found no clear evidence that Christianity has continued to grow as a share of China's population, with about 2% of adults identifying as Christian in surveys of the past decade. Its authors concluded that the Christian population may have plateaued or begun to decline, and that Christians are not on a trajectory to form a majority by mid-century. They criticized projections by Rodney Stark and Xiuhua Wang (about 580 million Christians by 2040) and by Fenggang Yang (a Christian majority by 2050) as extrapolations of annual growth rates from non-comparable sources that ignore China's declining population. Yang has argued instead that state restrictions may push religious activity into a "gray market" rather than stop its growth. Pew Research Center likewise found little evidence of growth in self-identified Christians after 2010, while cautioning that surveys may undercount Christians because of the political sensitivity of the topic.

Christianity by the years, CGSS surveys
Denomination	2006	2008	2010	2011	Average
Catholic	0.3%	0.1%	0.2%	0.4%	0.3%
Protestant	1.8%	2.1%	1.9%	2.2%	2.0%
Total Christian	2.1%	2.2%	2.1%	2.6%	2.3%

Christianity by age group, CFPS 2012
Denomination	60+	50–60	40–50	30–40	30-
Catholic	0.3%	0.3%	0.6%	0.1%	0.3%
Protestant	2.6%	2.0%	1.9%	1.1%	1.2%
Total Christian	2.9%	2.3%	2.5%	1.2%	1.5%

==== Demographics by province ====
Christian population by province in 2009 (Note: Data for Gansu, Guangdong, Liaoning, Henan, and Shanghai is updated according to the findings of the China Family Panel Studies of 2012.)
Province	Population	Christian %	Christians' number
Beijing Municipality	19,612,368	0.78%	152,976
Tianjin Municipality	12,938,224	1.51%	195,367
Hebei Province	71,854,202	3.05%	2,191,553
Shanxi Province	35,712,111	2.17%	774,953
Inner Mongolia Autonomous Region	24,706,321	2%	494,126
Liaoning Province	43,746,323	2.2%	962,419
Jilin Province	27,462,297	2%	549,246
Heilongjiang Province	38,312,224	2.2%	843,033
Shanghai Municipality	23,019,148	2.6%	598,498
Jiangsu Province	78,659,903	2.64%	2,076,621
Zhejiang Province	54,426,891	2.62%	1,425,984
Anhui Province	59,500,510	5.30%	3,153,527
Fujian Province	36,894,216	3.5%	1,291,298
Jiangxi Province	44,567,475	2.31%	1,029,508
Shandong Province	95,793,065	1.21%	1,159,096
Henan Province	94,023,567	6.1%	5,735,437
Hubei Province	57,237,740	0.58%	331,979
Hunan Province	65,683,722	0.77%	505,765
Guangdong Province	104,303,132	1%	1,043,031
Guangxi Zhuang Autonomous Region	46,026,629	0.26%	119,669
Hainan Province	8,671,518	0.48%	~41,623
Chongqing Municipality	28,846,170	1.05%	302,885
Sichuan Province	80,418,200	0.68%	546,844
Guizhou Province	34,746,468	0.99%	343,990
Yunnan Province	45,966,239	1.3%	597,561
Tibet Autonomous Region	3,002,166	0.23%	700 (Catholics only)
Shaanxi Province	37,327,378	1.57%	586,040
Gansu Province	25,575,254	0.5%	127,876
Qinghai Province	5,626,722	0.76%	42,763
Ningxia Hui Autonomous Region	6,301,350	1.17%	73,726
Xinjiang Uyghur Autonomous Region	21,813,334	1%	218,133
Hong Kong Special Administrative Region	7,061,200	11.7%	826,160
Macau Special Administrative Region	552,300	5%	27,615
Total	1,340,388,467	2.1%	28,327,679

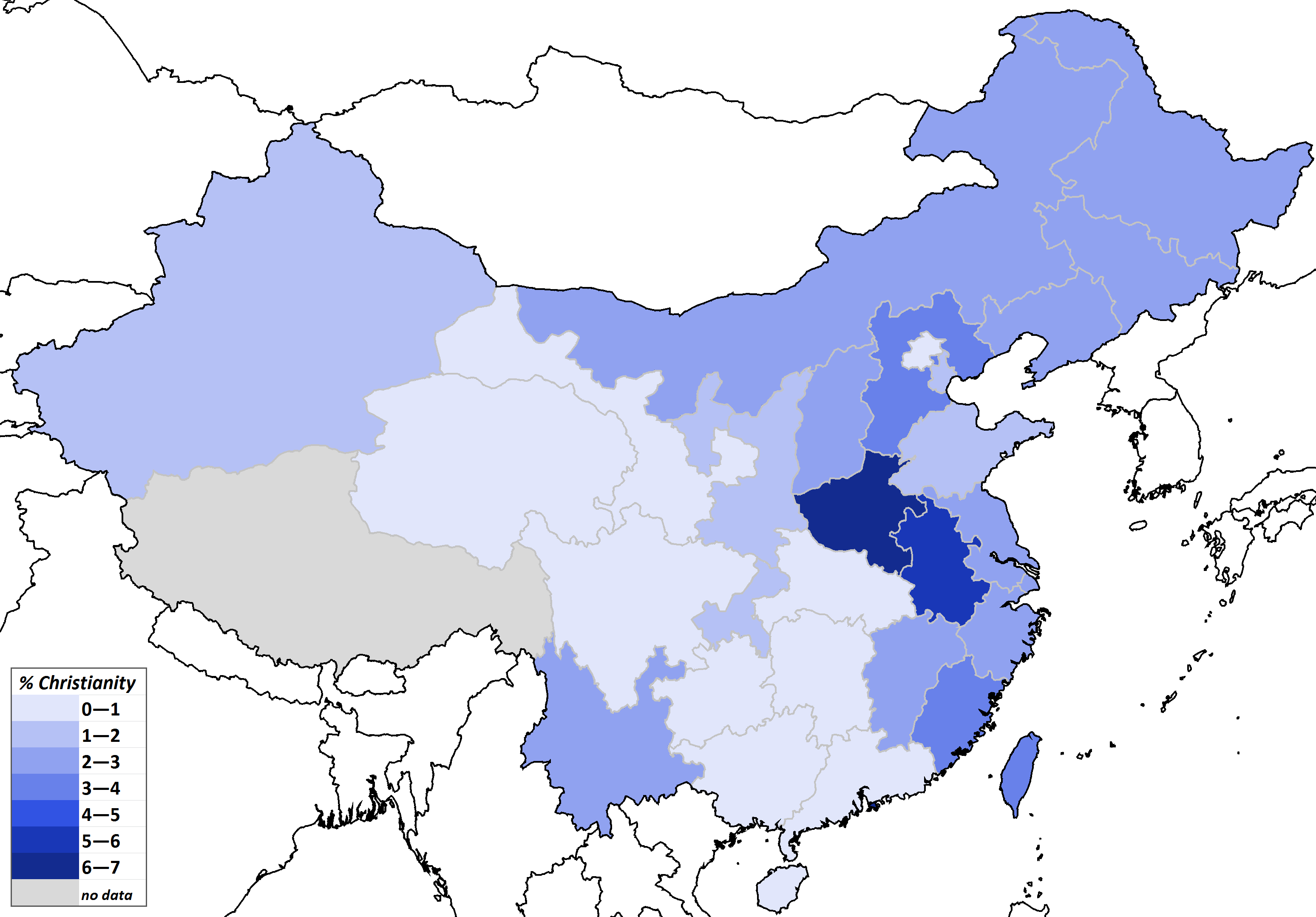
Mapping of Christianity in China by province according to the surveys.

Percentage of Christians (both registered and unregistered) by province according to the CFPS survey of 2012
Province	Protestants	Catholics	Total Christians
Gansu	0.4%	0.1%	0.5%
Guangdong	0.8%	0.2%	1%
Liaoning	2.1%	0.1%	2.2%
Henan	5.6%	0.5%	6.1%
Shanghai	1.9%	0.7%	2.6%
China (Note: Data for all provinces with Han Chinese majority, excluding Hainan, Hong Kong, Inner Mongolia, Macau, Ningxia, Qinghai, Tibet and Xinjiang.)	1.89%	0.41%	2.3%

Weighed proportion of Christians on the combined population of the six provinces of Jiangsu, Sichuan, Shaanxi, Jilin, Hebei and Fujian according to the Yu Tao—CCAP—PU survey of 2008
Protestantism	3.54%
Catholicism	0.39%
Total Christianity	3.93%

==== Special administrations ====
===== Hong Kong =====
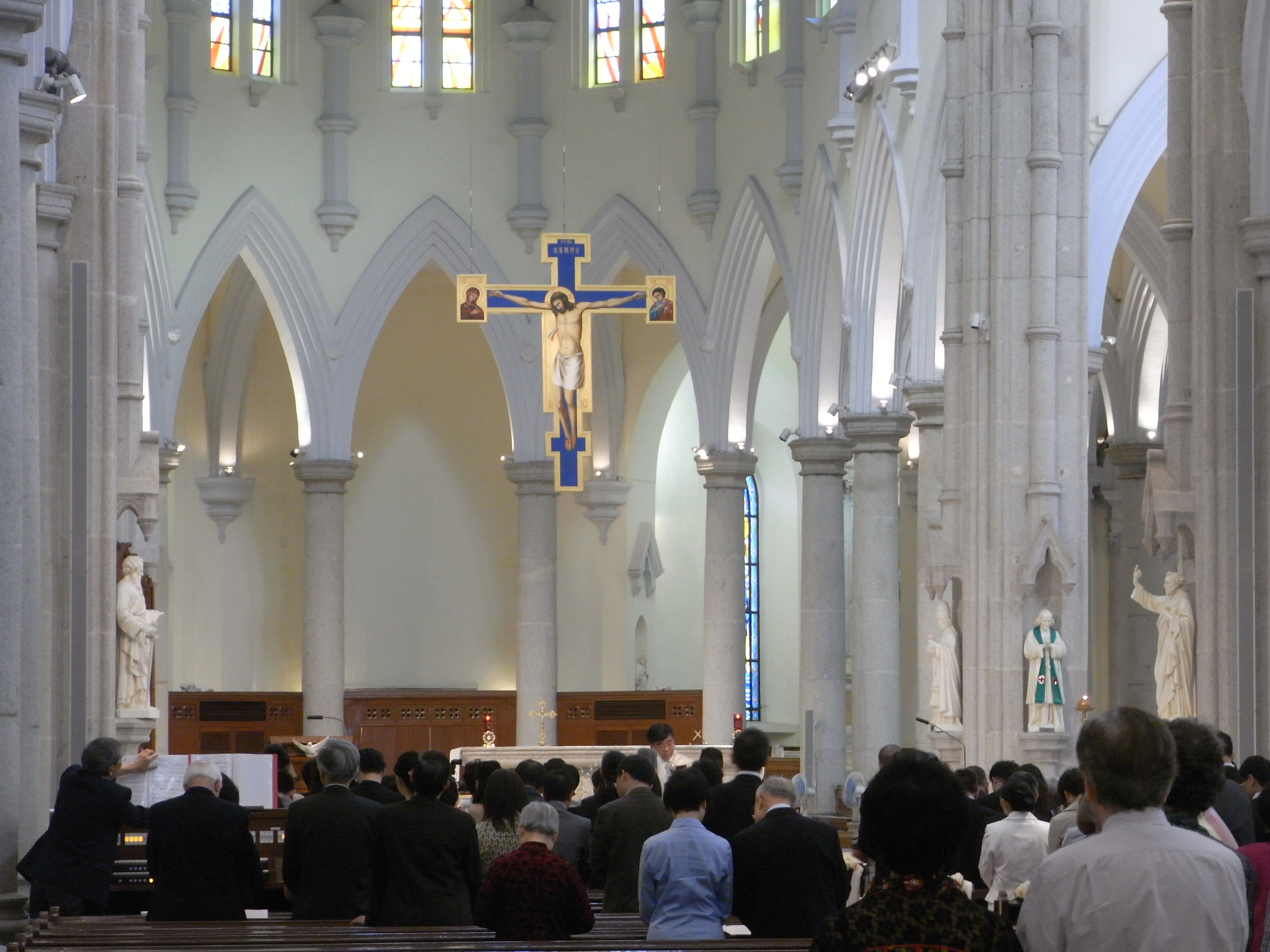
Cathedral of the Immaculate Conception in Hong Kong

Christianity has been practiced in Hong Kong since 1841. As of 2022, there were about 1.3 million Christians in Hong Kong (16% of the total population), most of them are Protestant (around 900,000) and Catholic (around 401,000).

===== Macau =====
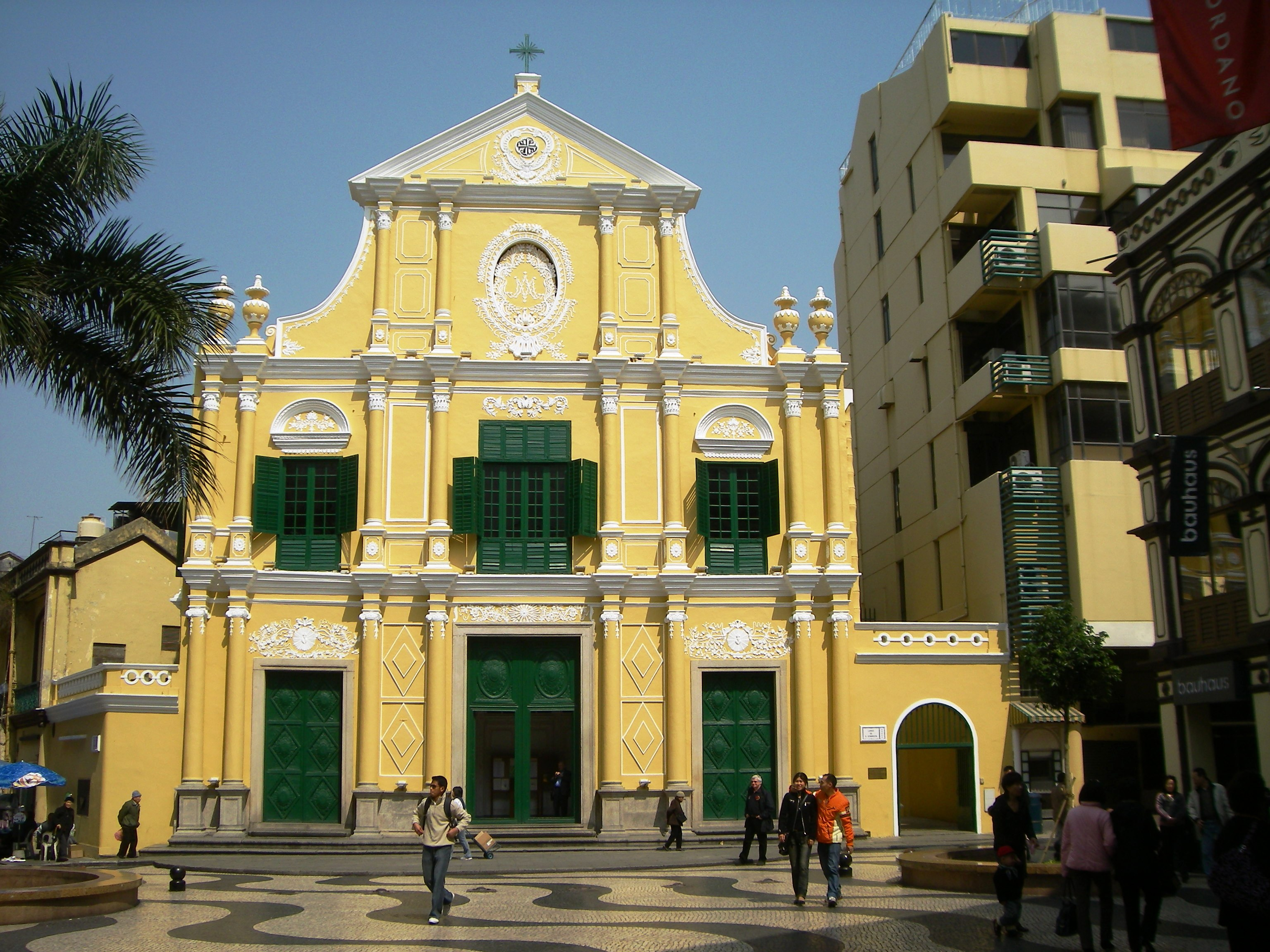
St. Dominic's Church in Macau is one of the oldest (AD 1587) existing churches in China built by three Spanish Dominican priests

As of 2010, approximately 5% of the population of Macau self-identifies as Christian, predominantly Catholic. Catholic missionaries were the first missionaries to arrive in Macau. In 1535, Portuguese traders obtained the rights to anchor ships in Macau's harbours and to carry out trading activities, though not the right to stay onshore. Around 1552–1553, they obtained temporary permission to erect storage sheds onshore, in order to dry-out goods that were drenched by sea water. They soon built rudimentary stone houses around the area that is now called Nam Van. In 1576, Pope Gregory XIII established the Diocese of Macau. In 1583, the Portuguese in Macau were permitted to form a senate to handle various issues concerning their social and economic affairs, under strict supervision by the Chinese government, but there was no transfer of sovereignty. Macau prospered as a port, but was the target of repeated failed attempts by the Dutch to conquer it in the 17th century. Cai Gao was the first mainland Chinese convert of the 19th-century Protestant missions. He was baptized by Robert Morrison at Macau in 1814.

==== Autonomous regions ====
===== Tibet =====
The Qing government permitted Christian missionaries to enter and proselytize in Tibetan lands, in order to weaken the power of the Tibetan Buddhist lamas, who refused to give allegiance to the Chinese. The Tibetan lamas were alarmed by Catholic missionaries converting natives to Catholicism. During the 1905 Tibetan Rebellion, the Tibetan Buddhist Gelug Yellow Hat sect led a Tibetan revolt, with Tibetan men being led by lamas against Chinese officials, western Christian missionaries, and native Christian converts. Wine-making vineyards were left behind by them.

===== Xinjiang =====
Christianity is a minority religion in the Xinjiang region of the People's Republic of China. The dominant ethnic group — the Uygurs — are predominantly Muslim, and very few of them are known to be Christian.

In 1904, George Hunter with the China Inland Mission opened the first mission station for CIM in Xinjiang. But already in 1892, the Mission Covenant Church of Sweden started missions in the area around Kashgar, and later built mission-stations, churches, hospitals, and schools in Yarkant and Yengisar. In the 1930s, there were several hundreds of Christians among these people, but because of persecution, the churches were destroyed and the believers were scattered. The missionaries were forced to leave because of ethnic and factional battles during the Kumul Rebellion in the late 1930s.

===== Guangxi =====
Rapid church-growth is reported to have taken place among the Zhuang people in the early 1990s. The region of Guangxi was first visited in 1877 by the Protestant missionary Edward Fishe of the China Inland Mission. He died the same year. Guangxi remains predominantly Buddhist and animistic.

== Art and media ==
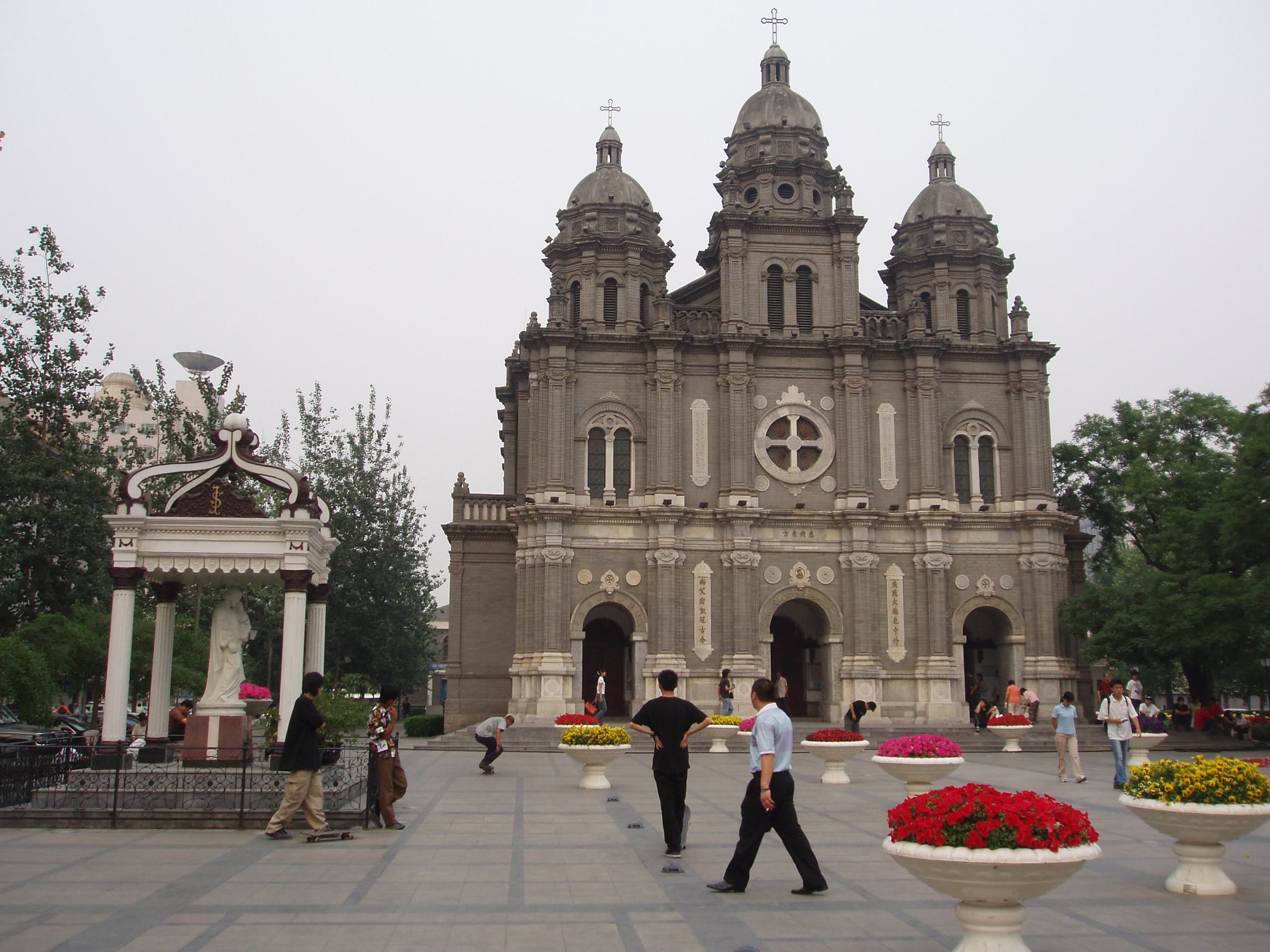
The St. Joseph's Church in Beijing.

Christian art is an important part of expressing faith for Christians, archeological sites containing early Christian art and architecture can be found throughout China and are protected by the government as Chinese antiquities.

There is Christian media produced in China. The Christian magazine Tian Feng has a large reach, as do the academic journals Chinese Theological Review and Nanjing Theological Review. The Bible is translated into Chinese, such as the Chinese New Version, Chinese Union Version, Delegates' Version, Studium Biblicum Version, and Today's Chinese Version. Hymnals include Canaan Hymns and Chinese New Hymnal. Contemporary Christian music is available on streaming services like QQ Music.

Foreign Christian media is handled differently than other forms of foreign media, as the China Film Administration and National Radio and Television Administration sees it as a distinctive expression of Christian faith. The Publicity Department of the Chinese Communist Party instead relegates the task of releasing and translation of foreign Christian films and Christian literature to the State Administration for Religious Affairs, and the various Catholic Patriotic Association, China Christian Council, and Three-Self Patriotic Movement denominations. Christian television series such as Superbook, The Chosen, and Duck Dynasty are widely available in China, and are oftentimes even dubbed into Chinese. Christian video games and interactive media are also accessible in Chinese, including the YouVersion Bible app and Superbook games.

== Restrictions and international interest ==
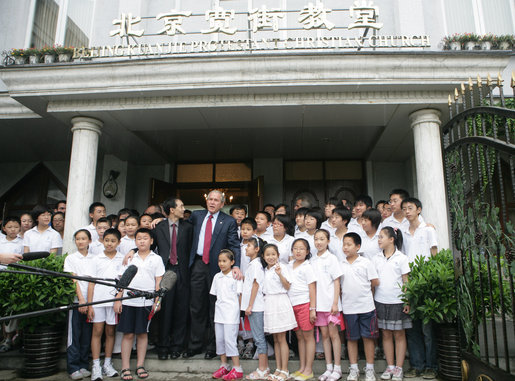
U.S. President George W. Bush at the Three-Self Kuanjie Protestant Church in 2008.

In large cities with international links such as Beijing, foreign visitors have established Christian communities which meet in public establishments such as hotels and, sometimes, local churches. These fellowships, however, are typically restricted only to holders of non-Chinese passports.

American evangelist Billy Graham visited China in 1988 with his wife Ruth; it was a homecoming for her since she had been born in China to missionary parents L. Nelson Bell and his wife Virginia.

Since the 1980s, U.S. officials visiting China have on multiple occasions visited Chinese churches, including President George W. Bush, who attended one of Beijing's five officially recognized Protestant churches during a November 2005 Asia tour, and the Kuanjie Protestant Church in 2008. Secretary of State Condoleezza Rice attended Palm Sunday services in Beijing in 2005.

The law does not define "proselytization", but the constitution states that nobody can force a citizen to believe or not believe in a religion; new laws in 2022 required anyone preaching online to apply for a permit for proselytizing.

During the 2008 Summer Olympics in Beijing, three American Christian protesters were deported from China after a demonstration at Tiananmen Square.

Pope Benedict XVI urged China to be open to Christianity, and said that he hoped the Olympic Games would offer an example of coexistence among people from different countries. Unregistered Catholic clergy has faced political repression, in large part due to its avowed loyalty to the Vatican, which the Chinese government has claimed interferes in the country's internal affairs.

The Associated Press reported in 2018 that "Xi is waging the most severe systematic suppression of Christianity in the country since religious freedom was written into the Chinese constitution in 1982." This has involved "destroying crosses, burning bibles, shutting churches and ordering followers to sign papers renouncing their faith," actions taken against "so-called underground or house churches that defy government restrictions." Since 2018, crucifixes and other religious imagery inside of churches have increasingly been replaced with images of Xi Jinping.

In April 2020, local authorities visited Christian homes in Linfen and informed welfare recipients that their benefits would be stopped unless they removed all crosses and replaced any displays of Jesus with portraits of Mao and CCP General Secretary Xi Jinping.

In June 2020, local officials oversaw the demolition of Sunzhuang Church in Henan province. Prior to the Church being demolished, one man was arrested and at least two women were injured.

In reports of countries with the strongest anti-Christian persecution, China was ranked by the Open Doors organisation in 2023 as 16th most severe.

In December 2023, Wang Huning stated that Christian groups must "adhere to the direction of the sinicisation of Christianity." In October 2025, the Chinese government arrested dozens of Zion Church members in Beijing, Shanghai, Shenzhen, and other cities. In January 2026, the authorities arrested leaders of the Early Rain Covenant Church.

== See also ==
- Bibliography of Christianity in China
- Catholic Church in China
- Chinese Orthodox Church
- Chinese Rites Controversy
- Christianity in Sichuan
- Denunciation Movement
- Historical Bibliography of the China Inland Mission
- Holy Cross Church, Wanzhou
- Protestantism in China
- Timeline of Christian missions
- List of Protestant theological seminaries in the People's Republic of China
- Heterodox teachings (Chinese law)
- Religion in China
- Freedom of religion in China
- Human rights in China#Religious freedom

== Sources and further reading ==
- Bays, Daniel H. (1999). Christianity in China: From the Eighteenth Century to the Present. Stanford University Press. ISBN 978-0-8047-3651-0
- ———— (2012). A New History of Christianity in China. Chichester, West Sussex; Malden, MA: Wiley-Blackwell. ISBN 9781405159548.
- Burgess, Stanley M.; Maas, Eduard M. van der, eds. (2002). "China". The New International Dictionary of Pentecostal and Charismatic Movements (Rev. and exp. ed.). Grand Rapids, Mi: Zondervan. pp. 58–65. ISBN 978-0-310-22481-5.
- Carpenter, Joel, and Kevin R. den Dulk. Christianity in Chinese Public Life: Religion, Society, and the Rule of Law. Palgrave Pivot, 2014. ISBN 978-1-137-42787-8
- Crofts, Daniel W. Upstream Odyssey: An American in China, 1895–1944 (East Bridge, 2008), scholarly biography of Daniel Crofts, minister in China Inland Mission (CIM).
- Esherick, Joseph W. (1987). The Origins of the Boxer Uprising. U of California Press. ISBN 0-520-06459-3. Excerpt
- Harrison, Henrietta, "'A Penny for the Little Chinese': The French Holy Childhood Association in China, 1843–1951." American Historical Review 113.1 (2008): 72–92. online
- Hynter, Jane. The gospel of gentility: American women missionaries in turn-of-the-century China (Yale UP, 1984).
- Latourette, Kenneth Scott (1929). A History of Christian Missions in China. online
- Lodwick, Kathleen L. (2016). How Christianity Came to China: A Brief History. Minneapolis, Minnesota: Fortress Press. ISBN 9781451472301.
- Lee Shiu Keung. The Cross and the Lotus. Christian Study Centre on Chinese Religion and Culture, Hong Kong, 1971.
- Marsh, Christopher. Religion and the State in Russia and China: Suppression, Survival, and Revival. Bloomsbury Academic, 2011. ISBN 978-1-4411-1247-7
- Miller, James. Chinese Religions in Contemporary Societies. ABC-CLIO, 2006. ISBN 978-1-85109-626-8
- Soong, Irma Tam (1997). "Sun Yat-sen's Christian Schooling in Hawai'i". The Hawaiian Journal of History. 13.
- Spence, Jonathan D. (1991). The Search for modern China. W. W. Norton & Company. ISBN 978-0-393-30780-1.
- Stark, Rodney. A star in the East : the rise of Christianity in China (2015) online
- Thompson, Phyllis. The Reluctant Exodus (Singapore: OMF Books, 1979)
- Varg, Paul. Missionaries, Chinese, and Diplomats: The American Protestant Missionary Movement in China, 1890–1952 (1958) online
- Wielander, Gerda. Christian Values in Communist China. Routledge, 2013. ISBN 978-0-415-52223-6
- Yin, Peng (2015). "Chinese Protestantism and the Prospect of a Public Religion". In Hunt, Stephen J. (ed.). Handbook of Global Contemporary Christianity: Themes and Developments in Culture, Politics, and Society. Brill Handbooks on Contemporary Religion. Vol. 10. Leiden: Brill Publishers. pp. 229–246. doi:10.1163/9789004291027_013. ISBN 978-90-04-26538-7. ISSN 1874-6691.

=== Historiography and memory ===
- Handbook of Christianity in China, Volume One: 635-1800, (Handbook of Oriental Studies: Section 4 China), Edited by Nicolas Standaert, Brill: Leiden – Boston 2000, 964 pp., ISBN 978-90-04-11431-9
- Handbook of Christianity in China. Volume Two: 1800 – present. (Handbook of Oriental Studies: Section 4 China), Edited by R. G. Tiedemann, Brill: Leiden – Boston 2010, 1050 pp., ISBN 978-90-04-11430-2
- Hayford, Charles (2014). "Christianity in China". Oxford Bibliographies Online Chinese Studies. doi:10.1093/obo/9780199920082-0104. ISBN 9780199920082.
- Ming Ng, Peter Tze (2015). "Chinese Christianity: A 'Global-Local' Perspective". In Hunt, Stephen J. (ed.). Handbook of Global Contemporary Christianity: Themes and Developments in Culture, Politics, and Society. Brill Handbooks on Contemporary Religion. Vol. 10. Leiden: Brill Publishers. pp. 152–166. doi:10.1163/9789004291027_009. ISBN 978-90-04-26538-7. ISSN 1874-6691.
- Ming Ng, Peter Tze (2012). Chinese Christianity: An Interplay between Global and Local Perspectives. Religion in Chinese Societies. Vol. 4. Leiden: Brill Publishers. doi:10.1163/9789004225756. ISBN 978-90-04-22574-9. ISSN 1877-6264.
- Mungello, D. E. "Reinterpreting the History Of Christianity in China." Historical Journal, 55#2 (2012), Pp. 533–552. online
- Balmont, Alexis (2025). Le christianisme chinois du haut Moyen Âge. Recherche historique, philologique et théologique sur les textes chrétiens chinois du VIIe au Xe siècle. Paris: Cerf. ISBN 978-2204168694. includes a critical edition of all Chinese Christian texts from the Tang period

=== Primary sources ===
- Taylor, James Hudson (1868). China's Spiritual Need and Claims (Third ed.). London: James Nisbet. online
