= List of Chinese Bible translations =

This is a list of Bible translations into Chinese.

Bible translations into Chinese began with translations made by the Church of the East under the Tang dynasty into Old Chinese. However, no surviving manuscripts exist, and the only surviving evidence of this is the Nestorian Stele and the six other Chinese Christian texts of that period, named the Jingjiao Documents, and recently edited by Alexis Balmont in 2025.

The next instance of Bible translations into Chinese languages subsists in unpublished manuscripts by individual Roman Catholic priests in the sixteenth century and individual Protestant missionaries in the early nineteenth century. The first complete translation to be published was that of Joshua Marshman in 1813, followed by that of Robert Morrison in 1823. A group of Protestant missionaries in Hong Kong in 1843 started a collaborative translation. The New Testament of their so-called "Delegates Version" was published in 1850 and the Old Testament in 1853. A translation of the Old Testament by Karl Gutzlaff, first published in 1840, was widely distributed and was used by the leaders of the Taiping Rebellion as the basis of their theological study.

The second half of the century saw the publication of Chinese Bibles in regional languages using romanization rather than Chinese characters, the first works printed in the regional languages. The Classical Chinese of the Delegates Version could not be understood when read aloud, and towards the end of the century the national missionary body started a revision which used vernacular Chinese. The resulting Union Version, published in 1919, became the standard translation for Protestants and was adapted and published in different forms, including Braille. A Chinese New Version was published in 1992 and a Revised Chinese Union Version in the early twenty-first century.

The Studium Biblicum Version, now the standard Chinese Bible for Catholics, was started in the 1930s and published in 1968. Starting in the 1850s, there have been three Russian Orthodox translations.

== Classical Chinese ==
The following lists translations in Classical Chinese:

- New Testament by Archimandrite Guri (Karpov) (新遺詔聖經), 1864
- New Testament by Bishop Innokenty (Figourovsky), 1910
- New Testament and Paraphrase of Psalms (John C. H. Wu and preface written by Pope Pius XII), 1946

== Mandarin Chinese ==
The following lists translations in the Northern Mandarin, Southern Mandarin, Western Mandarin and Hankou dialects of Mandarin Chinese:

=== Northern Mandarin ===
- New Testament of Robert Morrison (馬禮遜; simplified Chinese: 马礼逊; pinyin: Mǎ Lǐxùn) 1813
- Old Testament (Samuel Isaac Joseph Schereschewsky), 1875 Internet Archive
- New Testament (Peking Committee), 1870
- New Testament of Griffith John (杨格非译本), 1887
- Romanized Vernacular Version New Testament, 1889
- Portions of New Testament for the Blind
- Chinese Union Version (和合本 Héhéběn), 1919 United Bible Societies (HK), Amity Printing Company (PRC)
- Studium Biblicum Version, Scotus Chinese Version (思高本 Sīgāoběn), 1968 Amity Printing Company (PRC)
- Today's Chinese Version (現代中文譯本 Xiandai zhongwen yiben), 1975, 1979 United Bible Societies (HK), Amity Printing Company (PRC)
- New Chinese Version (新译本 Xinyiben), Worldwide Bible Society (环球圣经会) 1992
- Chinese Living Bible (当代圣经 Dangdai Shengjing) New Testament translation of the International Bible Society 1998
- Pastoral Bible (Chinese) (牧灵圣经 Muling Shengjing) 1999 Amity Printing Company (PRC)
- New World Translation of the Holy Scriptures (NWT 新世界译本 Xīnshìjiè-Yìběn), 2001. Available in simplified characters, traditional characters, and simplified with Pinyin.
- Chinese Standard Bible (CSB 中文标准译本 Zhongwen biaozhun yiben), New Testament, Global Bible Initiative and Holman Bible Publishers 2011
- Chinese NET Bible (NET圣经 中译本), 2011–2012
- Contemporary Chinese Version (CCV), The New Testament, 《圣经．新汉语译本》 Chinese Bible International (汉语圣经协会) 2010
- Chinese New Living Translation 《圣经．新普及译本》 Chinese Bible International (汉语圣经协会) 2012
- Contemporary Chinese Version (CCV), The New Pentateuch, 《五經．新汉语译本》 Chinese Bible International (汉语圣经协会) 2014
- Worldwide Chinese Bible 《環球聖經譯本》 Worldwide Bible Society (環球聖經公會) 2023

=== Southern Mandarin ===
- New Testament, 1856

=== Hankou dialect ===
- Book of Mark, 1921 using the Wangchao phonetic system.

== Wu Chinese ==
The following lists translations in the Suzhou, Shanghai, Ningbo, Hangzhou, Jinhua, Wenzhou, and Taizhou (Zhejiang) dialects of Wu Chinese:

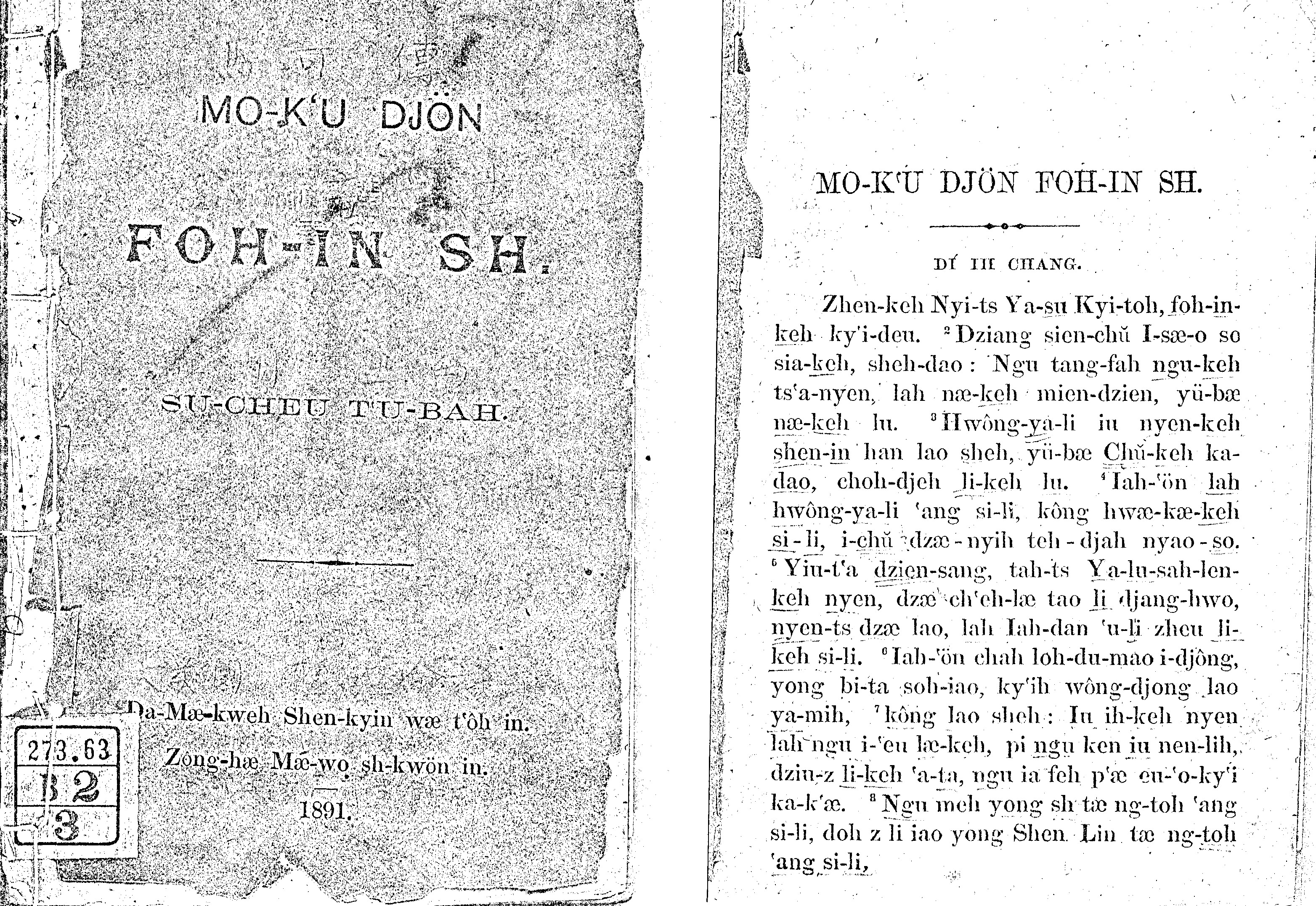
Bible in Soochowese Suzhou dialect Romanised (Gospel of Mark), published by the American Bible Society

=== Suzhou dialect ===
- New Testament, 1881

=== Shanghai dialect ===
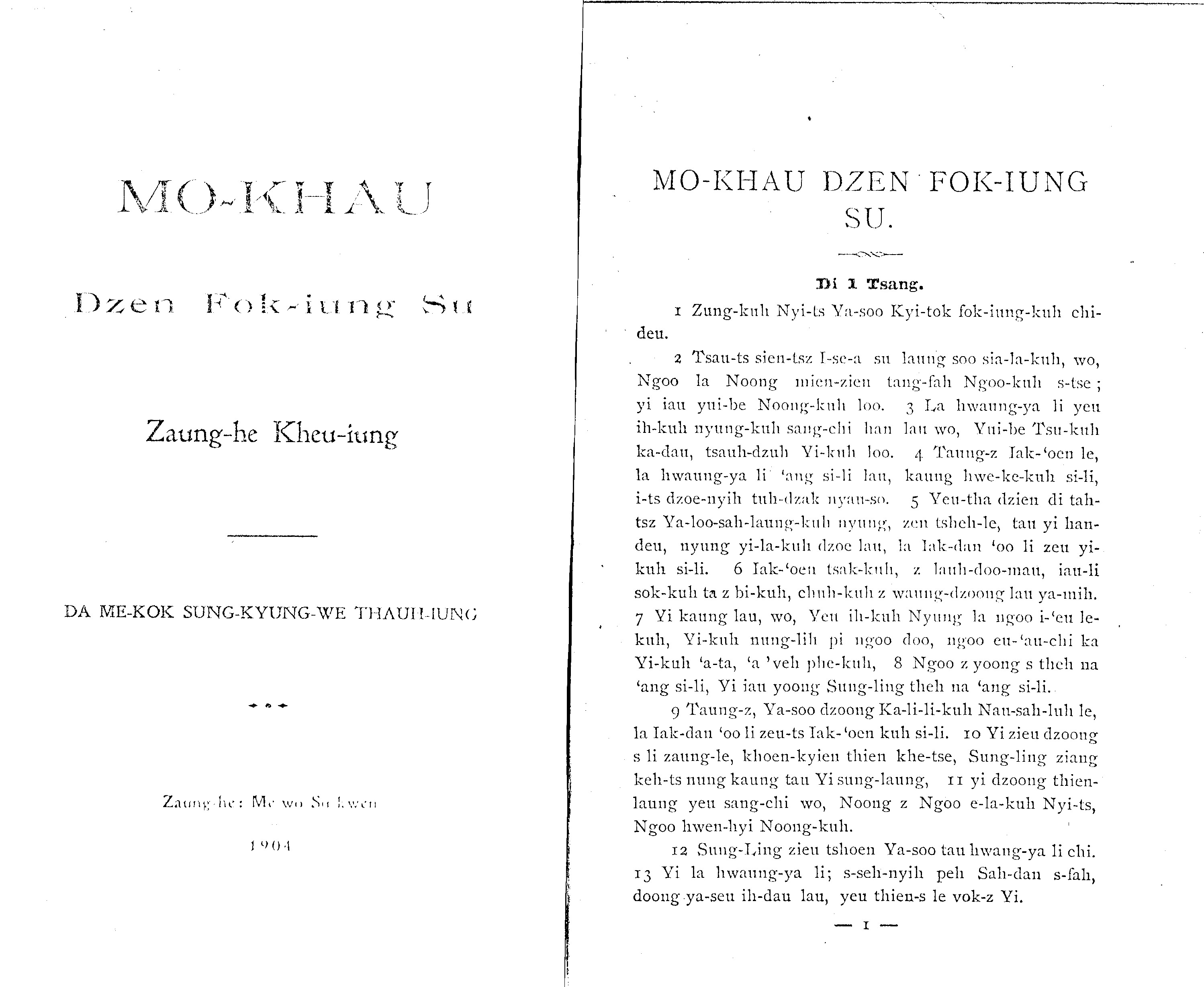
Bible in Shanghainese Romanised (Gospel of Mark), published by the American Bible Society

Character colloquial versions

- Isaiah-Daniel, 1886
- New Testament, 1870

Romanized vernacular versions

- New Testament, 1870

=== Ningbo dialect ===
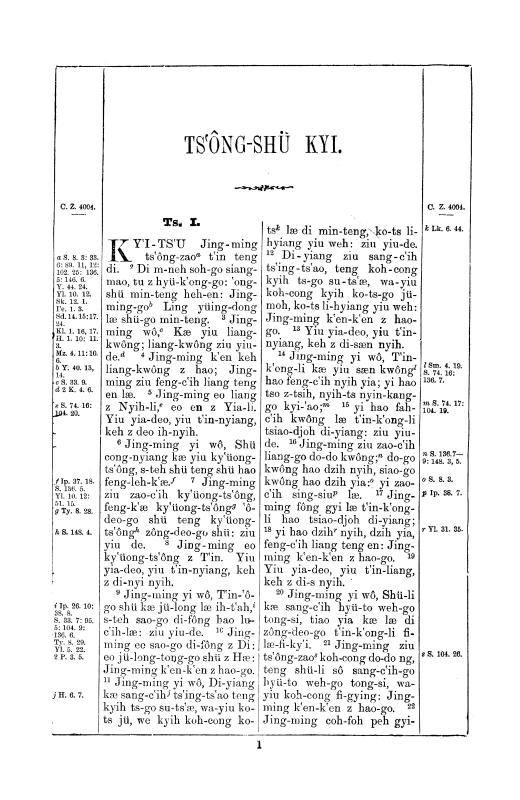
Bible in Ningpo (Ningbo) Romanised (Genesis), published by the British and Foreign Bible Society

Romanized vernacular versions

- Isaiah, 1870
- New Testament, Ah-lah kyiu-cü yiæ-su kyi-toh-go sing iah shü: Peng-veng fæn Nying-po t'u-wô. London, 1868 (Hudson Taylor, Frederick Foster Gough, Wang Laijun, others)

=== Hangzhou dialect ===
Romanized vernacular versions

- New Testament (parts), 1877 by the English Bible Society.
- Gospel of John, 1879 by the Anglican Missionary G. E. Moule
- Gospel of Matthew, 1880 by the English Bible Society.

=== Jinhua dialect ===
Romanized vernacular versions

- Gospel of John, 1866

=== Wenzhou dialect ===
- Matthew-Acts, 1890
- The Four Gospels and Acts, in Wenchow was published in 1894 under the title Chaò-chî Yi-sû Chī-tuh Sang Iah Sing Shī: Sz̀ fuh-iang tà sź-du ae-djüe fa üe-tsiu t'û, literally 救主 耶稣 基督 新 约 圣 书: 四 福音 及 使徒行传 翻 温州语, with the entire book in the Wenzhou dialect.

=== Taizhou dialect ===
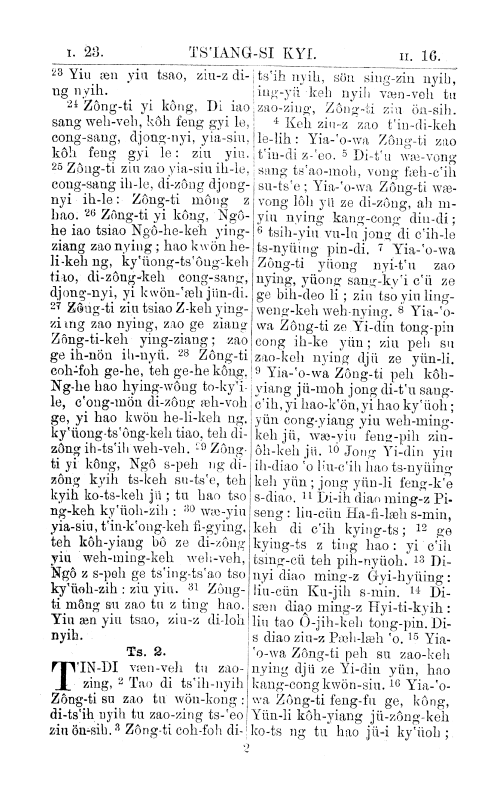
Bible in Taichow (Taizhou) Romanised (Genesis), published by the British and Foreign Bible Society

Romanized vernacular versions

- New Testament, Ngô-he kyiu-cü yia-su kyi-toh-keh sing-iah shü. Te-tsiu tu-wa; di-nyi-tʻao ing. Taizhou, 1897

== Northern Min ==
The following lists translations in the Jian'ou and Jianyang dialects of Northern Min:

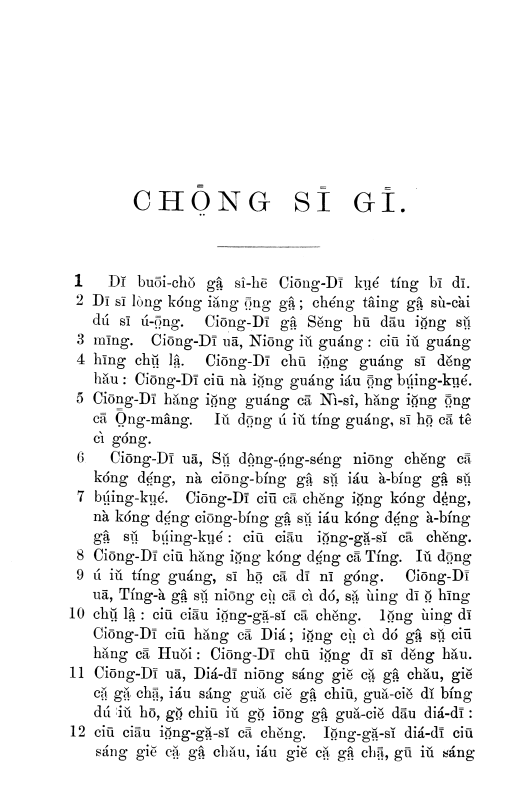
Bible in Jian'ou Romanised (Genesis), published by the British and Foreign Bible Society

=== Jian'ou dialect ===
Romanized vernacular versions

- Gospel of Mark, 1898 by the English Bible Society.
- Gospel of Matthew, 1900 by the Methodist Episcopal Mission Press. Translated by Hugh S. and Minnie Phillips.

=== Jianyang dialect ===
Romanized vernacular versions

- Gospel of Mark, 1898 by the English Bible Society.
- Gospel of Matthew, 1900 by the Methodist Episcopal Mission Press. Translated by Hugh S. and Minnie Phillips of the American Bible Society.

== Eastern Min ==
The following lists translations in the Fuzhou dialect of Eastern Min:

=== Fuzhou dialect ===
Character colloquial versions

- Old Testament, 1875–1884
- New Testament, 1856
- Complete Bible (福州土腔聖經), 1937. Printed by the British and Foreign Bible Society and the American Bible Society.

Romanized vernacular versions

- Gospel of John, 1886
- Gospel of John, 1889
- New Testament, after 1890
- Foochow Colloquial Bible, 1908. Printed by the British and Foreign Bible Society in Fuzhou.

== Southern Min ==
The following lists translations in the Amoy, Shantou, Teochew, and Hainan Junjiahua dialects of Southern Min:

=== Amoy dialect ===
Romanized vernacular versions

- Old Testament, 1852–1884
- New Testament, about 1853-1873
- Gospel of Matthew, for Blind, 1888

=== Shantou dialect ===
Character colloquial versions

- Genesis, 1879
- Ruth, 1875
- Matthew–1 Corinthians, Philippians, 1 Thessalonians–Titus, Hebrews, 1 2 3 John, 1880–1884

Romanized vernacular versions

- Genesis, 1888
- Jonah, 1888
- Gospel of Matthew, 1889
- Gospel of Mark, 1890
- Gospel of Luke, 1876
- Acts, 1889
- James, 1888
- Kiù-tsú Iâ-sou Ki-tok kâi Sin-ieh Tshuân-tsṳ Chiēⁿ-Kńg Má-thài kàu Sài-thû. Su-kat-lân: Tãi Eng-kok lãi gūa Siàⁿ-tsṳ-hũe Ìn. 1892. (Printed for the British and Foreign Bible Society by Blackie & Son, Limited, Glasgow)

=== Teochew dialect ===
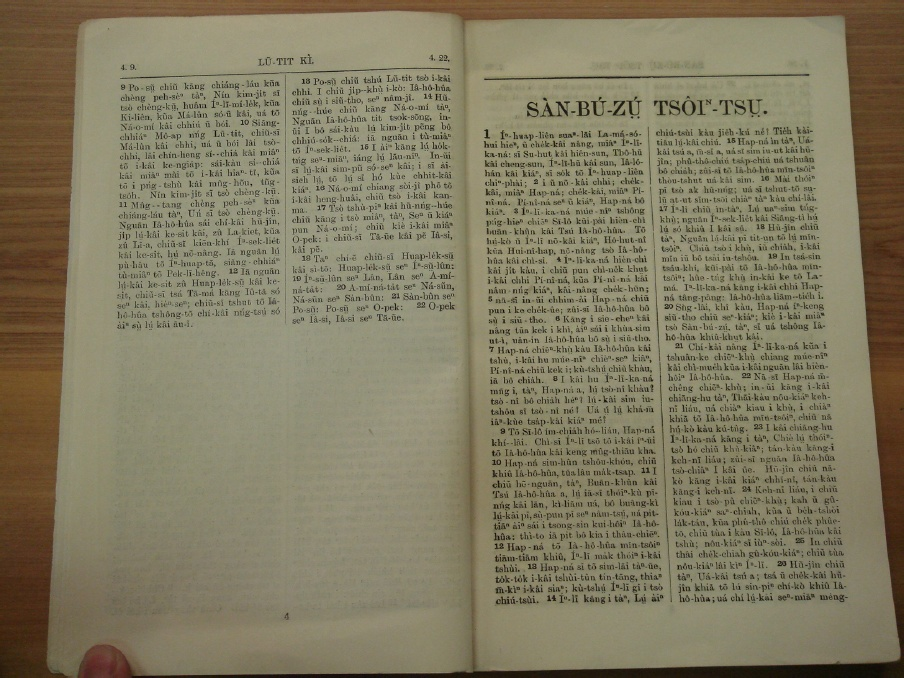
Bible in Teochew Romanised (First Book of Samuel), published for the British and Foreign Bible Society

Romanized vernacular versions

- Kū-ieh sàn-bú-zṳ́ ẽ-kńg tshûan-tsṳ e̍k-tsò tiê-chiu pe̍h-ūe. Sùaⁿ-thâu, Loí-pài-tn̂g, Hon̂g-soh-hṳn Ìn. 1898. (Printed for the British and Foreign Bible Society at the English Presbyterian Mission Press, Swatow)
- New Testament, 1915 by English Presbyterian Missionary societies.

=== Hainan Junjiahua ===
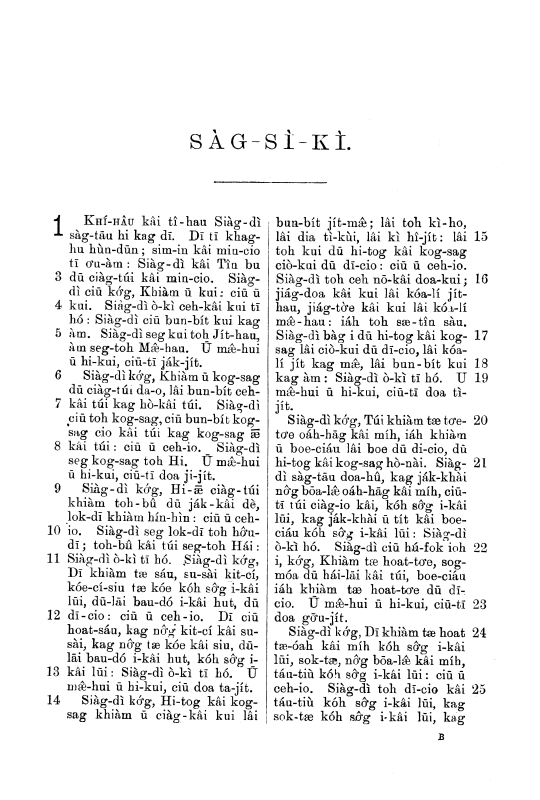
Bible in Hainan Romanised (Genesis), published by the British and Foreign Bible Society

Romanized vernacular versions

- Gospel of Matthew, 1891
- Gospel of John, 1893

== Xinghua (Puxian) Min ==
The following lists translations in Xinghua (Puxian) Min:

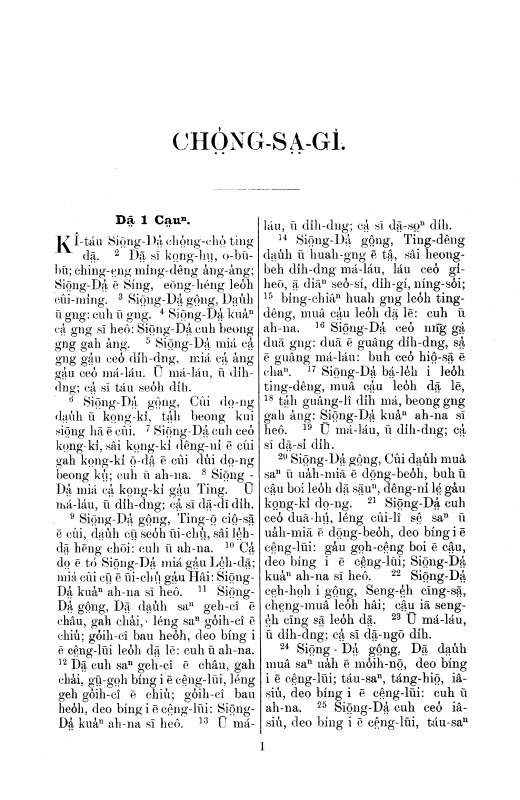
Bible in Hinhwa (Xinghua) Romanised (Genesis), published by the British and Foreign Bible Society

Romanized vernacular versions

- Gospel of John, 1892 by the American Bible Society.
- Gospel of Mark, 1893
- Gospel of Matthew, 1894
- Acts, 1894
- Gospel of Luke, 1895

== Gan Chinese ==
The following lists translations in the Shaowu and Jianning dialects of Gan Chinese:

=== Shaowu dialect ===
Romanized vernacular versions

- Book of James, 1891 by the American Board of Commissioners for Foreign Missions.

=== Jianning dialect ===
- Gospel of Matthew, 1896 by the American Bible Society.
- Gospel of John, 1897 by the Bible Society of Great Britain in London.

== Hakka ==
The following lists translations in the Tingzhou, Wujingfu Hakka, Swatow Hakka, and Taiwan Siyen Hakka dialects:

Character colloquial versions

- Genesis and Exodus, 1886
- Psalms, 1890
- New Testament, 1883
- Old Testament and New Testament, 1930

Romanized vernacular versions

- Das Evangelium des Matthaeus im Volksdialekte der Hakka-Chinesen, 1860 by Rudolf Lechler
- New Testament, 1860–1883
- New Testament (Bible Society in Taiwan), 1993 (with the Psalms); Proverbs 1995.

=== Tingzhou dialect ===
- Gospel of Matthew (Romanised), 1919

=== Wujingfu Hakka dialect (五经富) ===
- New Testament, 1916

=== Swatow Hakka dialect ===
- New Testament, 1924

=== Taiwan Siyen Hakka dialect ===
- Hakka Bible: Today's Taiwan Hakka Version, 2012

== Yue Chinese (Cantonese) ==
The following lists translations in the Guangzhou, Lianzhou, and Yangcheng dialects of Yue Chinese:

=== Guangzhou dialect (Cantonese) ===
Translations into Cantonese include:

Character colloquial versions

- 聖經―新廣東話/新廣東話聖經 [Holy Bible ― New Cantonese Bible]. Hong Kong Bible Society. 2006. ISBN 978-962-293-885-4.
- The New Testament in English and Canton colloquial. American Bible Society. 1917.
- Canton Colloquial Bible/廣東話舊新約全書. British and Foreign Bible Society. 1907.
- Genesis-Leviticus, Deuteronomy, Psalms, 1873–1888
- New Testament, 1872–1883

Romanized vernacular versions

- Gosepel of Luke, 1867
- Gospel of Mark, after 1890

=== Lianzhou dialect ===
- Gospel of Matthew, 1904 by the American Bible Society. Translated by the missionary Eleanor Chesnut.
- Gospel of Mark, 1905
- Gospel of Luke, 1905
- Gospel of John, 1905

=== Yangcheng dialect ===
- Gospel of Matthew, 1862 by the American Presbyterian Church. Translated by Charles F. Preston.
- Gospel of John, 1862
- Gospel of Luke, 1867 by the English Bible Society. Translated by Wilhelm Lauis.

== Notable translations ==
Chinese Bible used by the Filipino-Chinese Anglican Community in Saint Stephen's Pro-Cathedral under the Episcopal Church in the Philippines

- Robert Morrison. 耶酥基利士督我主救者新遺詔書 : 俱依本言譯出 (Ye Su Ji Li Shi Du Wo Zhu Jiu Zhe Xin Yi Zhao Shu : Ju Yi Ben Yan Yi Chu). Canton, 1813. New Testament.
- 遺詔全書, 1822
- 神天聖書, 1823–1824
- Lassar-Marshman Version (遺詔全書, 1822)
- Morrison-Milne Version (神天聖書, 1823–1824)
- Delegates Version (委辦譯本 or 代表譯本, 1854)
- Archimandrite Gury's New Testament (新遺詔聖經, 1864) and Psalms (聖詠經, 1879)
- Chinese Union Version (和合本), 1904–1919
- Chinese Union Version (和合本, 1919 and 文理和合, 1934)
- Studium Biblicum Version (思高譯本), 1935–1968
- New Testament and paraphrase of Psalms by John C. Wu (新經全集 and 聖詠譯義), 1946
- Studium Biblicum Version (思高譯本, 1968)
- Lü Zhenzhong's version of the Bible (呂振中譯本, 1970)
- Chinese Living Bible (當代聖經, 1974)
- Today's Chinese Version (現代中文譯本), Dangdai shenjing 1979
- New Chinese Version (聖經新譯本), 1993
- Pastoral Bible (Chinese) (牧靈聖經), 1991–1999
- New World Translation (聖經新世界譯本 漢語版), 2001
- Recovery Version (聖經恢復本), 2003
- Chinese Contemporary Bible (当代译本, 2010)
- Chinese Standard Bible (中文標準譯本, 2011)
- Chinese NET Bible NET聖經（中譯本）, 2011–2012
- Contemporary Chinese Version (CCV), The New Testament, 《新約．新漢語譯本》, 2010
- Chinese New Living Translation (CNLT), 《聖經．新普及譯本》, 2012
- Contemporary Chinese Version (CCV), The Pentateuch, 《五經．新漢語譯本》, 2014
- The New Testament in English and Mandarin, 1904.
- The New Testament in English and Mandarin, American Bible Society. 1885
