= Nanjing Amity Printing =

Chinese printing company

Nanjing Amity Printing Co., Ltd. 南京爱德印刷有限公司
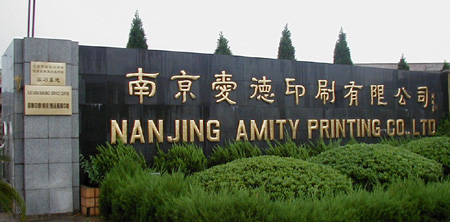
- Formerly: Nanjing Amity Printing Factory
- Type: Limited company Foreign-invested company
- Industry: Printing
- Founded: 1988
- Headquarters: 99 Middle Mozhou Rd, Jiangning, Nanjing, Jiangsu, China
- Services: Printing of publications, mainly Bibles
- Total assets: 7.14 million USD
- Parent: Amity Foundation (74.65％); United Bible Societies (25.35％)
- Website: amityprinting.com

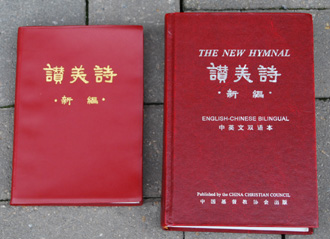
Chinese New Hymnal printed by Nanjing Amity Printing

Nanjing Amity Printing Co., Ltd. (Chinese: 南京爱德印刷有限公司) is the largest producer of Bibles in China, and one of the largest in the world. It is a joint venture with Amity Foundation and United Bible Societies.

== History ==
In its first year (1988), it printed 500,000 Bibles on a press donated by UBS. Since 1988, it has published Bibles in Mandarin and in several ethnic minority languages, as well as in many other languages for export. It is China's only legal printer of Bibles.

The APC has so far published more than 100 million Bibles. Most of the Bibles printed are the Chinese Union Version (Chinese: 和合本, 1919), the Chinese Bible translation used by the Protestant churches, or the less commonly accepted but more modern Today's Chinese Version. Recently the Pastoral Bible used by the Catholic churches has also been printed here. All Chinese Bibles are distributed not by the state-run bookstore chains (such as Xinhua Bookstore), but through the network of officially registered Protestant churches.

Since China's adoption of the New Regulations on Religious Affairs in 2018 that banned online bookstores from selling Bibles, the APC has been facing difficulty in printing Chinese Bibles. This has caused a shortage of Catholic Bibles in Hong Kong.
