= Bible translations into the languages of Taiwan =

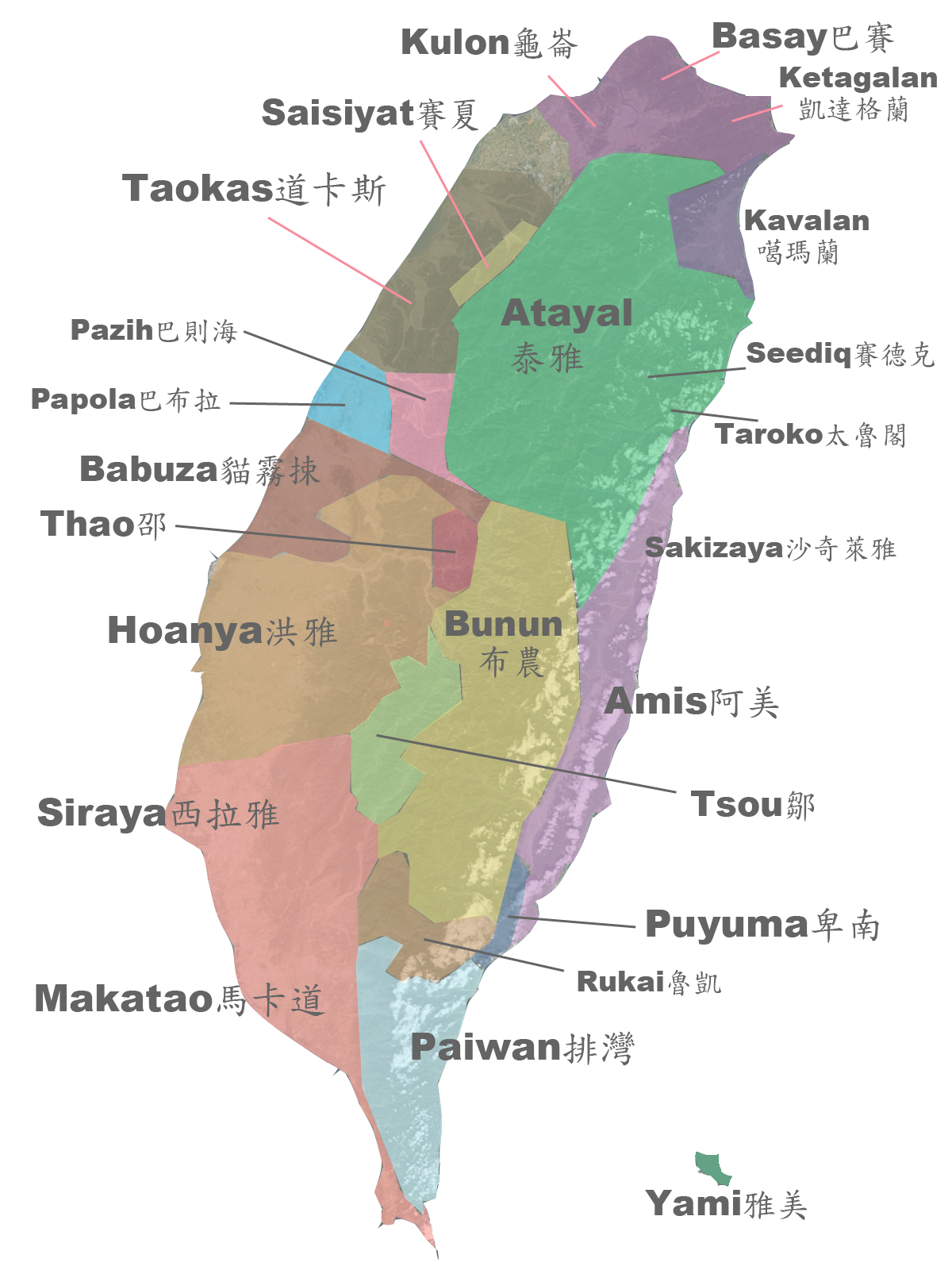
The distribution of indigenous languages used in Taiwan

The Bible translations into the languages of Taiwan are into Taiwanese, Hakka, Amis, and other languages of Taiwan.

== Mandarin Chinese ==
In Taiwan, the dominant language of government, commerce, education, media, and public life is Mandarin Chinese (Chinese: 國語; pinyin: Guóyǔ; Zhuyin Fuhao: ㄍㄨㄛˊ ㄩˇ). Historically, Mandarin was heavily promoted by the government.

The predominant translation used by Protestants in Taiwan remains the Chinese Union Version (Chinese: 和合本; pinyin: Héhé Běn; Zhuyin Fuhao: ㄏㄜˊ ㄏㄜˊ ㄅㄣˇ), while Catholics in Taiwan principally use the Studium Biblicum Version (思高本; Sīgāo Běn; ㄙ ㄍㄠ ㄅㄣˇ). Mandarin Chinese Bible editions used in Taiwan are printed in traditional Chinese script, often using vertical text, although more modern horizontally written editions are also common.

== Taiwanese ==
The majority of the Taiwan people speak Taiwanese, sometimes called Taiwanese Hokkien or Southern Min (Chinese: 閩南語; pinyin: Mǐnnányǔ; Pe̍h-ōe-jī: Bân-lâm-gí/gú) because their ancestors came from the southern part of China's Fujian Province (Chinese: 福建; Pe̍h-ōe-jī: Hok-kiàn), which has the abbreviated appellation Min (Chinese: 閩; pinyin: Mǐn; Pe̍h-ōe-jī: Bân).

In 1916, Thomas Barclay finished the New Testament translation into Taiwanese Hokkien, followed by the Old Testament translation using Latin script in 1930. He carried out the translation with Chinese assistants in Xiamen, Fujian. His complete Bible, now called the Amoy Romanized Bible (Chinese: 廈門音羅馬字聖經; pinyin: Xiàményīn Luómǎzì Shèngjīng; Pe̍h-ōe-jī: Ē-mn̂g-im Lô-má-jī Sèng-keng), was published in Shanghai in 1933. The copies of this translation was once confiscated by the Taiwan Garrison Command during the martial law era for "obstructing of the Kuo-yu policy". In 1996, this Bible was transliterated into Chinese characters, and called the Taiwanese Han Character Bible (pinyin: Táiyǔ Hànzì Běn Shèngjīng; Pe̍h-ōe-jī: Tâi-gí Hàn-jī Pún Sèng-keng). A new revision of this Bible translation, the Taiwanese Bible: Today's Taiwanese Version (Chinese: 台語漢字本聖經; pinyin: Táiyǔ Hànzì Běn Shèngjīng; Pe̍h-ōe-jī: Tâi-gí Hàn-jī Pún Sèng-keng) using Latin and Han script was completed in late 2021.

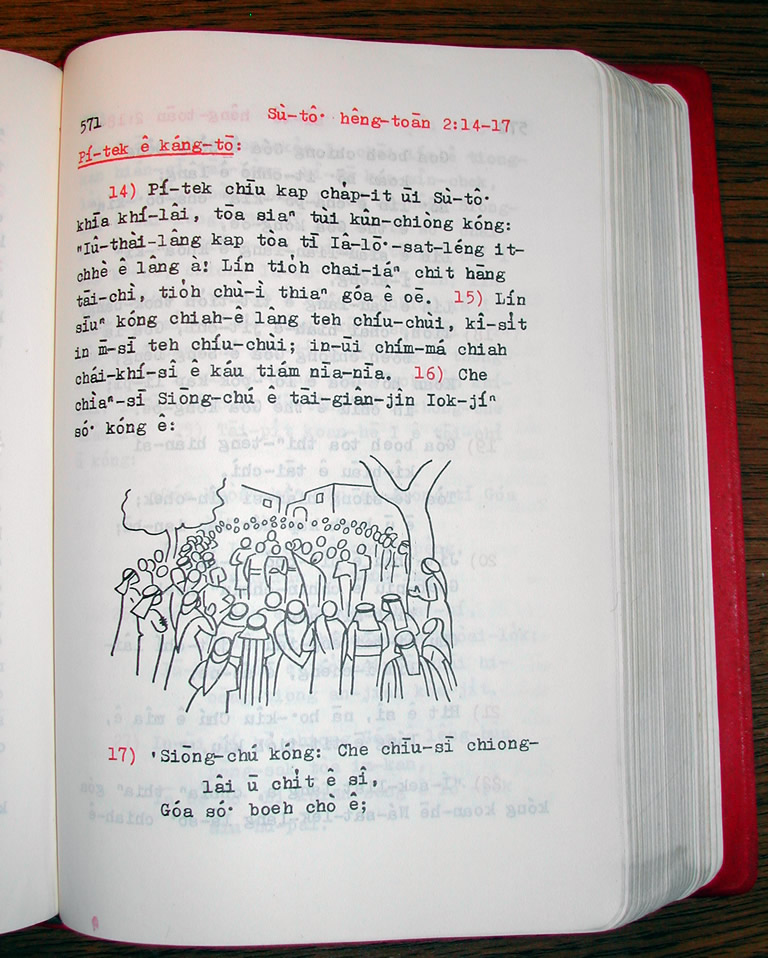
A page from the Red-Cover Bible

The Ko–Tân (Kerygma) Colloquial Taiwanese Version of the New Testament (Sin-iok) in Pe̍h-ōe-jī, also known as the Red Cover Bible (Âng-phoê Sèng-keng), was published in 1973 as an ecumenical effort between the Protestant Presbyterian Church in Taiwan and the Roman Catholic mission Maryknoll. This translation used a more modern vocabulary (somewhat influenced by Mandarin), and reflected the central Taiwan dialect, as the Maryknoll mission was based near Tâi-tiong. It was soon confiscated by the Kuomintang government (which objected to the use of Latin orthography) in 1975.

A translation using the principle of functional equivalence, "Today's Taiwanese Romanized Version" (現代台語譯本; Hiān-tāi Tâi-gú E̍k-pún), containing only the New Testament, again in Pe̍h-ōe-jī, was published in 2008 as a collaboration between the Presbyterian Church in Taiwan and the Bible Society in Taiwan; a parallel-text version with both Han-character and Pe̍h-ōe-jī orthographies was published in 2013. A translation of the Old Testament following the same principle was completed and the whole Bible was published in 2021 as a parallel-text volume.

Another translation using the principle of functional equivalence, "Common Taiwanese Bible" (Choân-bîn Tâi-gí Sèng-keng), with versions of Pe̍h-ōe-jī, Han characters and Ruby version (both Han characters and Pe̍h-ōe-jī) was published in 2015, available in printed and online.

Translation	John 3:16
1933 Taiwanese Bible Romanized Character Edition (Thomas Barclay)	In-ūi Siōng-tè chiong to̍k-siⁿ ê Kiáⁿ siúⁿ-sù sè-kan, hō͘ kìⁿ-nā sìn I ê lâng bōe tîm-lûn, ōe tit-tio̍h éng-oa̍h; I thiàⁿ sè-kan kàu án-ni.
1973 Ko–Tân/Kerygma “Red Cover Bible” (Âng-phoê Sèng-keng)	Siōng-chú chiah-ni̍h thiàⁿ sè-kan-lâng, só͘-í chiah chiong I ê Ko͘-kiáⁿ siúⁿ-sù in, thang hō͘ só͘ ū sìn I ê lâng m̄-bián bia̍t-bông, lâi tit-tio̍h éng-seng.
1996 Taiwanese Bible Han Character Edition	因為上帝將獨生的子賞賜世間，互見若信伊的人，𣍐沈淪，會得著永活，伊疼世間到按呢。
2013 ≈ 2021 Today’s Taiwanese Romanized Version (Hiān-tāi Tâi-gú E̍k-pún)	Siōng-tè liân I to̍k-it ê Kiáⁿ to sù hō͘ sè-kan, beh hō͘ ta̍k ê sìn I ê lâng bián bia̍t-bông, hoán-tńg tit-tio̍h éng-oán ê oa̍h-miā, I chiah-ni̍h thiàⁿ sè-kan!
2015 Common Taiwanese Bible" (Choân-bîn Tâi-gí Sèng-keng)	Siōng-tè chiah-ni̍h thiàⁿ sè-kan, sīm-chì siúⁿ-sù to̍k-seⁿ Kiáⁿ, hō͘ só͘-ū sìn I ê lâng bē tîm-lûn, hoán-tńg ē tit tio̍h éng-oán ê oa̍h-miā.

== Hakka ==
The Hakka people live mainly in Taiwan's northwest areas, such as Taoyuan City, Hsinchu County and Miaoli County. The Hakka language is one of the four languages (the other three being Mandarin Chinese, Taiwanese and English) heard in the public transportation announcement in Taipei. Bible translation into Hakka language started in 1984. In 1993, the New Testament with the Psalms in Hakka was published, followed by the publication in 2012 of Hakka Bible: Today's Taiwan Hakka Version.

== Amis ==
The Amis people, living in Taiwan's east coast (Hualien, Taitung County and Pintung Counties), are the largest group among the Taiwanese indigenous peoples. In 1957, the Book of John was translated into Amis language using Bopomofo. After 1963, translation proceeded using Pinyin, and the New and Old Testaments in Amis were published in 1997. A revised version of New Testament with Psalms and Proverbs was published in 2019.

== Other languages ==
The first translation of any portion of the Bible into any Formosan language which has survived is the 1661 translation into Siraya. Two gospels, that of Matthew and John, have been found and re-published; these texts are among the only sources for the revitalization of the language in the 21st century.

The Bible translations into other languages of Taiwan are done or being done:

- Paiwan language (New Testament/part of OT in 1993),
- Bunun language (NT in 1983; part of Old Testament in 2000),
- Atayal language (NT using Bopomofo in 1974; Romanized NT/part of OT in 2003; Complete Romanized text in 2022),
- Truku language (NT in 1960; NT/OT in 2005),
- Tao/Yami Language (NT in 1994; OT in progress),
- Rukai (NT in 2001; NT/OT in 2017),
- Tsou language (NT in 2013; OT in progress), Seediq language (NT/OT in 2020).

Additionally, there have been efforts to translate the Bible into Taiwanese Sign Language.

== See also ==
- Bible translations
- Ethnicity of Taiwan
- Religion in Taiwan
- Catholic Church in Taiwan
