= Delegates' Version =

- Full name: Delegates' Version
- Other names: 代表譯本
- Abbreviation: DV
- Language: Chinese
- OT published: 1854
- NT published: 1852
- Complete Bible published: 1858
- Authorship: Walter Henry Medhurst, Elijah Coleman Bridgman, et al.
- Copyright: Public domain (copyright expired)
- Religious affiliation: Protestant
- Genesis 1:1–3 太初之時、上帝創造天地。地乃虛曠、淵際晦冥、上帝之神、煦育乎水面。上帝曰、宜有光、即有光。 John 3:16 蓋上帝以獨生之子賜世、俾信之者免沉淪、而得永生、其愛世如此、

The Delegates' Version was a significant translation of the Bible into Chinese produced by a committee of Protestant missionaries in classical, literary Chinese. The New Testament was completed in 1850, and published by the British and Foreign Bible Society in 1852. Two separate Old Testament translations were produced, one published by the British and Foreign Bible Society in 1854 and in a single volume in 1858, whereas another was published by the American Bible Society in 1863.

== History ==
In August 1843, a meeting of missionaries was held in Hong Kong to discuss the question of whether another revision of the Bible should be produced. A plan was adopted by which the services of every missionary capable of rendering aid were enlisted, and at five stations local committees were formed, to each of which a share of the work of revision was given. From these local committees, delegates were appointed to form a general committee of revision, by which the translations of the local committees were to be compared, and the version finally determined by the votes of the delegates.

The first meeting of the delegates was held in June 1847. The committee consisted of:

- Bishop William Jones Boone (American Episcopal Mission), based in Shanghai
- Walter Henry Medhurst (London Missionary Society), based in Shanghai
- Walter M. Lowrie (American Presbyterian Mission), based in Ningbo
- John Stronach (London Missionary Society), based in Amoy
- Elijah Coleman Bridgman (American Board of Commissioners for Foreign Missions), based in Guangzhou

Lowrie drowned shortly after the work was begun and William Charles Milne was elected to fill his place. Bishop Boone never attended a meeting of the delegates after the first chapter of St. Matthew's Gospel was finished. However, when the version was finished, Boone repudiated all responsibility for it, so that the translation was understood to be virtually the work of the English missionaries Medhurst, Stronach, and Milne.

The committee, aided by several Chinese scholars (such as Wang Tao), continued their work daily from 10:00am to 2:00pm, almost without intermission. The translation of the New Testament was finished in July 1850 and was published in 1852 with the approval of the delegates, and became known as Delegates' Version.

Soon after the publication of the New Testament, a translation of the Old Testament was commenced. But owing to a division among the members, the committee separated, resulting in two versions. One was completed in 1853 by the English missionaries Medhurst, Stronach, and Milne, and published by the British and Foreign Bible Society in 1854, followed by a single volume published in 1858. This has also been called the Delegates' Version. The American missionaries Bridgman and Michael Simpson Culbertson withdrew from the committee of delegates and prepared a separate final version, published by the American Bible Society in 1863.

== Later versions ==
Though the Delegates' Version was recognized as having an elegant style, its use of classical Chinese limited its usefulness for commoners to understand. Notably, two members of the Delegates' Version translation committee, Walter Henry Medhurst and John Stronach, decided to introduce a new translation in Nanjing Mandarin and known as the Nanking Version. Medhurst translated the Old Testament and Stronach carried out the translation of the New Testament. The entire Bible was published by the British and Foreign Bible Society in 1856 and became the first translation not based on literary Chinese.

The Imperial Edition of the New Testament (Chinese: 君王版新約全書; pinyin: Jūnwáng-bǎn Xīnyuē Quánshū), also known as the Cixi Bible (Chinese: 慈禧聖經; pinyin: Cíxǐ Shèngjīng) is a specially produced edition of the Delegates' Version, presented to Empress Dowager Cixi on the occasion of her sixtieth birthday in 1894. Organized through contributions from Chinese Christian women and several missionary societies, the version presented to Cixi was bound in silver boards, and housed in a matching silver casket. The edition is distinguished by its gilt decoration, black Morocco leather binding with allegorical figures of birds and bamboo, the words Salvation Bible (Chinese: 救世聖經; pinyin: Jiùshì Shèngjīng) on the front, and a title page in Chinese and English highlighting its provenance. Although two hundred and fifty copies were printed from the same type in Shanghai, only four were known to be extant as of 2004.

Several other translations were produced in classical Chinese, as well as in regional Chinese languages. However, by 1890 at the General Conference of the Protestant Missionary of China, it was agreed that a Chinese Bible should be produced that would be acceptable to all Protestant denominations, which resulted in the Chinese Union Version published in 1919.
