= Chinese Standard Bible =

Translation of the Bible into Chinese

- Original title: 中文标准译本 (Pinyin: Zhōngwén biāozhǔn yìběn)
- Language: Chinese
- Genre: Bible version
- Publisher: Holman Bible Publishers
- Publication date: 2009
- Publication place: Hong Kong
- Media type: Print (hardback & paperback)

The Chinese Standard Bible (CSB 中文标准译本 Zhōngwén biāozhǔn yìběn) is a Chinese Bible translation produced by the Global Bible Initiative and Holman Bible Publishers in 2009.

== Status ==
As of May 2024, the entire New Testament and 26 books of the Old Testament had been completed. The projected completion time of the remaining Old Testament books is March 2026.

== Printed editions ==
- Mandarin CSB/CUV Parallel New Testament 2009 1433600129

== See also ==
- Bible translations into Chinese
