= Amity Foundation =

Chinese charity

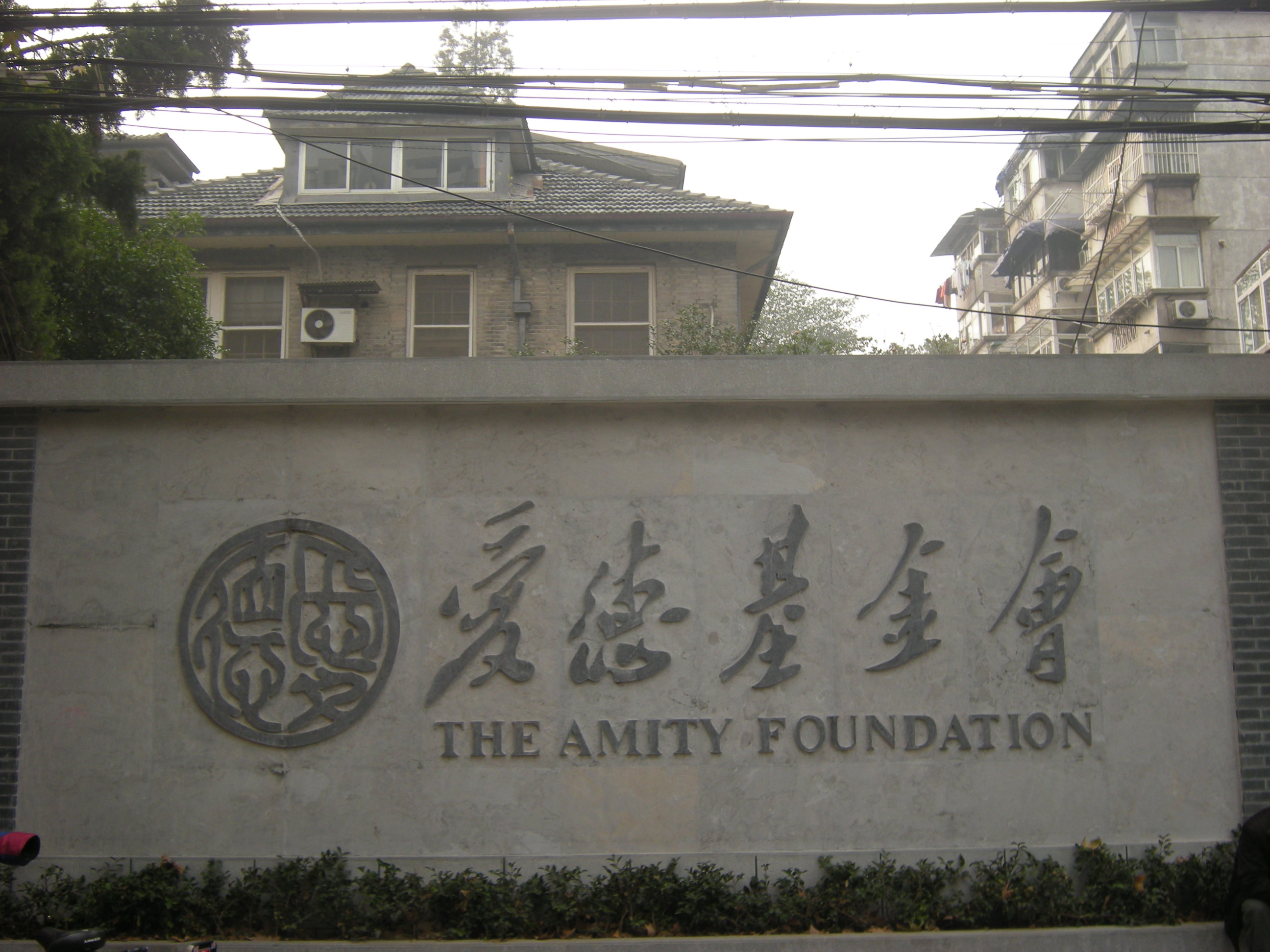
- The Amity Foundation Headquarters in Nanjing, China
- Formation: 1985; 41 years ago
- Headquarters: Nanjing
- Website: www.amityfoundation.org.cn

The Amity Foundation (simplified Chinese: 爱德基金会; traditional Chinese: 愛德基金會; pinyin: Àidé Jījīnhuì) is a Chinese voluntary organization. As of 2010, it is the largest charity in China. It was created in 1985 on the initiative of Christians in China, with the late bishop K. H. Ting as its founder. Its main objective has been to help develop poor areas of the country. Amity's headquarters are in Nanjing. The organization includes the Amity Printing Company (APC, also sometimes called Amity Printing Press), the largest Bible producer in China. Amity Printing Company opened a branch in Ethiopia in 2016. Amity Foundation has an office in Hong Kong and opened a liaison office in the Ecumenical Center of the World Council of Churches in Geneva in 2017.

== Ideals ==
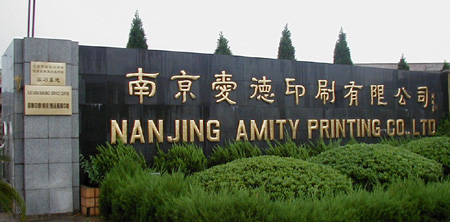
Amity Printing Company, Nanjing, China

Some have described Amity as a faith-initiated organization that works with Christians, while others, such as the current General Secretary Qiu Zhonghui, have described it as a faith-based organization. Various partner organizations have praised the work and activity of the charity. Recently the charitable organisation has been highlighted in both domestic and international media for its action and prompt relief work in China in response to natural disasters.

== Activities ==
- Disaster relief
- Support of church-run social work
- Support of medical education in China's poorest areas
- HIV/AIDS awareness and prevention training
- Education in the countryside and for the children of migrant workers, including the Amity Teachers Program
- Special education (e.g. work with deaf or disabled children)
- Taking care of orphans
- Environmental protection
- Integrated development (e.g. providing basic health care, schooling, clean energy, agricultural skills training and microfinance to a village community)

The foundation also holds the world's largest Bible printer, Nanjing Amity Printing Company.

== See also ==
- Chinese Bible Translations
- Christianity in China
- United Bible Societies
