= Jean Basset (died 1707) =

French Catholic missionary (c. 1662 – 1707)

Jean Basset (c. 1662 – 1707) was a French Catholic missionary and Bible translator in Qing-era China.

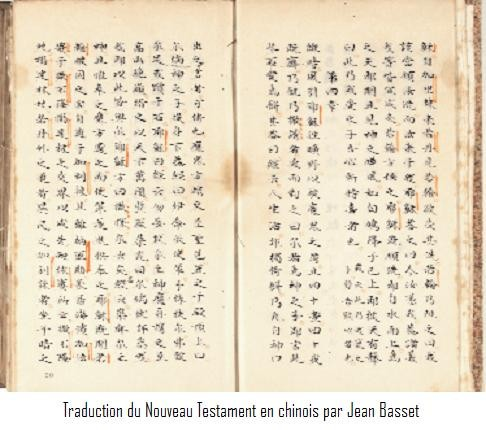
Basset–Su Chinese New Testament

Basset was born around 1662 in Lyon. He entered the seminary of the Paris Foreign Missions Society in 1684 and in 1685 was sent as a missionary to Siam. In 1689 he arrived at Guangzhou (Canton) in China. In 1692–93 he served as provicar of the mission in the province of Jiangxi. (A provicar was second in the missionary hierarchy below the vicar apostolic.) From 1702 he was an active evangelist in southern and western Sichuan. He travelled extensively across the province, bought a house in Ya'an and established mission stations in Long-hou-pou, Kiong tcheou, Houang-kia-keou, Min-chan, Gan-io, Sin-tou, Pong-chan, King-tang, etc. He composed a short catechism which was used in Sichuan until 1904. He died in Guangzhou in December 1707.

During his stay in Sichuan, Basset translated from the Latin Vulgate into Chinese the Gospels, the Acts of the Apostles, the Pauline epistles and the first chapter of the Epistle to the Hebrews, with the assistance of a local convert Johan Su (徐若翰). The work, now known as Basset–Su Chinese New Testament, was incomplete at his death. A manuscript in which the Gospels had been condensed into a Gospel harmony was discovered by John Hodgson in China in 1738 and a copy made. This was given to Hans Sloane, who donated it to the British Museum. It served as a basis for the translation work of Robert Morrison. Basset also wrote a Chinese guide to the Bible in question-and-answer form, Ching-tien Chi-lüeh Wen-ta (經典紀略問答).

== See also ==
- Catholic Church in Sichuan
