= Chinese New Version =

Chinese-language Bible translation

- Original title: 新譯本 (Simplified 新 译本)
- Language: Chinese
- Genre: Bible version
- Publisher: Worldwide Bible Society
- Publication date: 1992
- Publication place: China (Hong Kong)
- Media type: Print (Hardback & Paperback)

The Chinese New Version (abbreviation: CNV; simplified Chinese: 新译本; traditional Chinese: 新譯本) is a Chinese language Bible translation that was completed in 1992 by the Worldwide Bible Society (環球聖經公會 Huanqiu Shengjing Xiehui) with the assistance of the Lockman Foundation. It was formerly known as the "New Chinese Version" (NCV), but the English name and abbreviation were changed to avoid confusion with the English New Century Version.

== Text ==
John 3:16 神爱世人，甚至把他的独生子赐给他们，叫一切信他的，不至灭亡，反得永生。

== Editions ==
It is available in Hong Kong in both the traditional Chinese script and the simplified Chinese used in mainland China - although the version is not approved for use in China by the Three Self Patriotic Movement. The most popular Chinese Bible in mainland China remains the older Chinese Union Version, and secondly the legally produced Today's Chinese Version. The Three Self Church discourages the use of the Chinese New Version and other unlicensed versions. However, in Taiwan and Hong Kong the CNV has found a following especially in evangelical circles.

The Sword Project and Olive Tree Bible Software both have modules for both the New Chinese Version and the Union Version of the Bible. More recently (as of January 2014) these bibles were made available for parallel searching at BibleHunter.com and Holy-Bibles.net.

== See also ==
- Chinese Bible Translations
