= Chinese New Living Translation =

- Original title: 新普及译本 Xin puji yiben
- Language: Chinese
- Genre: Bible version
- Publisher: Chinese Bible International
- Publication date: 2004
- Publication place: Hong Kong
- Media type: Print (hardback & paperback)

The Chinese New Living Translation (新普及译本 Xin puji yiben) is a dynamic equivalent Chinese New Testament translation published in paperback in Hong Kong by Chinese Bible International (汉语圣经协会 Hanyu Shengjing Xiehui) in 2004 and revised in 2006. The base text is the English New Living Translation with comparison with the Greek originals.

John 3:16 上帝如此深爱世人，甚至赐下自己的独生子，叫一切相信他的人不至灭亡，反得永生。

== See also ==
- New Living Translation
- Chinese Bible Translations
- Online text of Chinese Living Translation
