= Josiah Goddard =

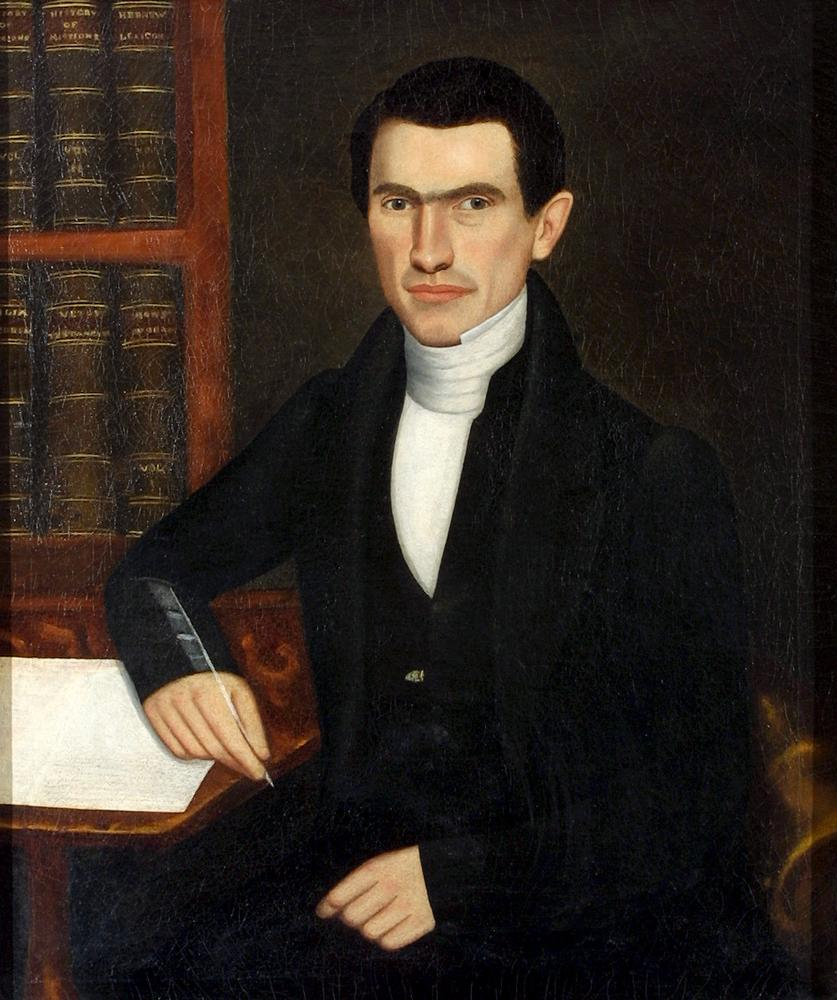
Josiah Goddard, painted in 1838

Josiah Goddard (1813–1854) was an American Baptist missionary in China.

== Early life ==
Goddard was born in Wendell, Massachusetts, on 27 October 1813. He became a hopeful Christian in 1826 and was baptized in May, 1831. He graduated from Brown University in 1835 and the Newton Theological Institution in 1838.

== Missionary ==
Ordained to the Baptist ministry, Goddard and his wife, Eliza Abbot, were appointed by the Baptist Board for Foreign Missions to work with the Chinese in Siam (Thailand) and they sailed in December, 1838. They landed at Singapore in June, 1839. They moved to Bangkok on 16 October 1840.

At Bangkok in 1842, Josiah Goddard succeeded William Dean as pastor of the first Chinese Baptist church. He also finished the translation of the Gospel of John, and it was printed. He prepared for the press some Christian tracts and an English and Chinese vocabulary, and labored there for six years until his health failed.

In 1848 the Goddards moved to Ningpo (Ningbo), northeast Chekiang (Zhejiang) Province, China. This was a response to a severe attack of bleeding at the lungs suffered by Goddard. The change of climate arrested the progress of the disease, and allowed him to continue his work. To do this he was obliged to learn the Ningbo dialect. Josiah mastered the Tie-Chiu (Teochew) dialect and preached to a new congregation. He was best known for the quality of his translation work, some of which was among the first English to Chinese. From 1842 to 1854 he completed five tracts, a catechism, a vocabulary, and the entire New Testament. His work and life came to an end September 4, 1854.

Dean wrote of Goddard, "His native endowments were superior; his education had been extended and thorough; his study of the Chinese language had been patient and successful; his knowledge of the sacred languages and literature was accurate and familiar, and he brought to his work a large share of common sense and sound judgment, and a warm heart and high-toned Christian principles."

Collections from American Universities:

1. Separate portraits of Josiah and his wife, Eliza, are now part of the Brown University Library collection, having been donated by the Goddard family. Their portraits were done by Erastus Salisbury Field prior to their departure for the Far East. Oil on canvas, painted by the American artist Erastus Salisbury Field. 28 3/4 in. Courtesy of the Brown University Portrait Collection, Brown University, Providence, R.I.

2. University of Rochester: consists of 13 items. Most of them were presented by William Dean. Each bears a "University of Rochester No.XXXX/Presented by Wm. Dean, D.D." bookplate. Of those not presented by Dean, one came from Issachar J. Roberts 羅孝全 (1802–1871), with the handwritten note, "For University of Rochester/Rochester N.Y./With Rev. I. J. Roberts's compliments's/Shanghae, China. 1854" and a "University of Rochester. No.4596/Presented by Rev. I. J. Roberts of Shanghae, China" bookplate. Another one was presented by Josiah Goddard, with the handwritten note, "Rochester University/Care of the President/Compts of J. Goddard."

== Family and legacy ==
The Goddard children, some of whom married members of the William Dean family, produced several generations of Baptist missionaries in China, including Josiah Ripley Goddard, Augusta Fanny Dean, Anna Kate Goddard, Francis Wayland Goddard, and Anna M. Corlies.

== Bibliography ==
Goddard published a number of tracts, including:

- Josiah Goddard (1883). A Chinese and English vocabulary: in the Tie-chiu dialect (2 ed.). SHANGHAI: Amer. Presbyterian Mission Press. pp. 237. Alt URL(the New York Public Library)(Digitized Apr 2, 2008 )
- A Temperance Tract: An Inquirer's Guide
- A History of Elijah
- His New Testament in Chinese was first published in 1853 for the American and Foreign Bible Society
