= Hakka Bible: Today's Taiwan Hakka Version =

Bible translation into Taiwanese Hakka

- Full name: Hakka Bible: Today's Taiwan Hakka Version
- Other names: Hak-ngî Sṳn-kîn: Hien-thoi Thòi-vân Hak-ngî Yi̍t-pún
- Abbreviation: TTHV
- Language: Hakka language
- OT published: 2012
- NT published: 1993
- Complete Bible published: April 22, 2012 (includes 2012 revised NT, Psalms and Proverbs.)
- Derived from: Today's Chinese Version (TCV)
- Publisher: Bible Society in Taiwan
- Religious affiliation: Protestant
- John 3:16 Yîn-vi Song-ti thung-siak sṳ-kiên-ngìn, só-yî chiông Kì Thu̍k-yit ke Lai-é su-pûn kì-têu, oi pûn yit-chhiet sin kì ke ngìn `m-voi me̍t-mòng, fán-chón tet-tó yún-yén ke sâng-miang.

The Hakka Bible: Today's Taiwan Hakka Version (TTHV), (Pha̍k-fa-sṳ: Hak-ngî Sṳn-kîn: Hien-thoi Thòi-vân Hak-ngî Yi̍t-pún) is the most recent revised Hakka language translation of the Bible used by Hakka Protestants in Taiwan and overseas Hakka communities. Work on the translation commenced in 1984 with the TTHV New Testament & Psalms completed in 1993, Proverbs was published separately in 1995. The entire Bible (including revisions to the NT, Psalms and Proverbs) was made available on April 11, 2012, at the Presbyterian Church in Taiwan's annual General Assembly meeting. An ecumenical dedication and thanksgiving ceremony was held on April 22, 2012, at the National Chiao Tung University in Hsinchu with over 1,200 Hakka Christians in attendance.

The TTHV is currently available in both Romanized Hakka and Hakka language Chinese characters, and is published in Taiwan by the Bible Society in Taiwan, the Taiwan branch of the United Bible Society with printing of the first 6,000 copies already distributed from Bible printing agencies in South Korea due to their more extensive experience in printing higher quality Bibles when compared to those in Taiwan.

The twenty-six year translation initiative was a joint project undertaken amongst representatives of the Bible Society in Taiwan, the Presbyterian Church of Taiwan, the Presbyterian Church in Canada and the Christian Hakka Evangelical Association

== Historical background ==
=== Previous Hakka Bible translations ===
==== Basel Mission in China ====
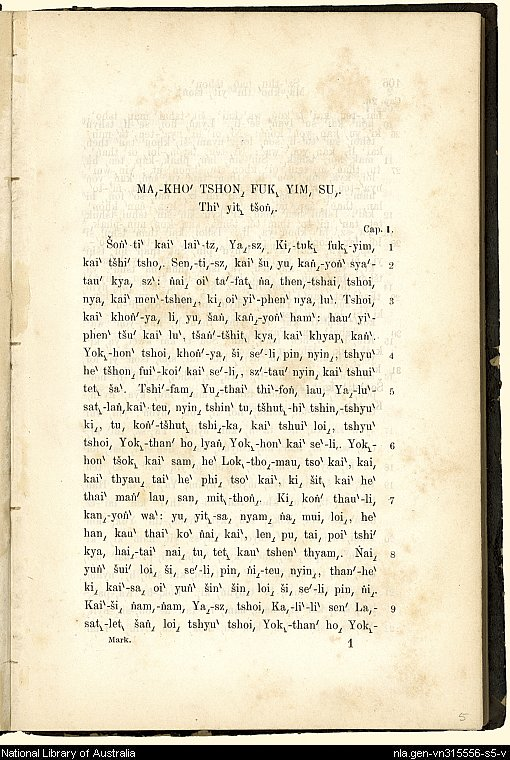
The Hakka Gospel of Mark published in 1874 using Lepsius Romanization by the Basel Missionary Society for the British and Foreign Bible Society.

The earliest attempts to evangelize the Hakka people in China were from the Swiss and German missionaries of the Basel Missionary Society who arrived in Guangdong Province on March 19, 1847. Hakka dictionaries were subsequently compiled by the Swedish Theodore Hamberg and the Gospel of Matthew was translated by Rudolf Lechler into Romanized Hakka in 1860 and published in Berlin by the Basel Missionary Society. The Gospel of Luke was translated and published in Hong Kong in 1866 after revision from both Lechler and Philip Winnes. The entire romanized New Testament of the Hakka Colloquial Version was completed by Reverend Charles Piton in 1883 with help from Hakka assistants such as Kong Fat-lin In 1886, translation work on the Book of Genesis and Book of Exodus was undertaken by Otto Schultze. The

A revised edition of the Hakka New Testament was subsequently made with the expenses promised to be reimbursed by the British and Foreign Bible Society provided that the content was written in Hakka Chinese characters and this was completed in 1904. The entire Old Testament translation into Hakka Chinese Characters was completed and published in 1916.

==== English Presbyterian Mission in China ====
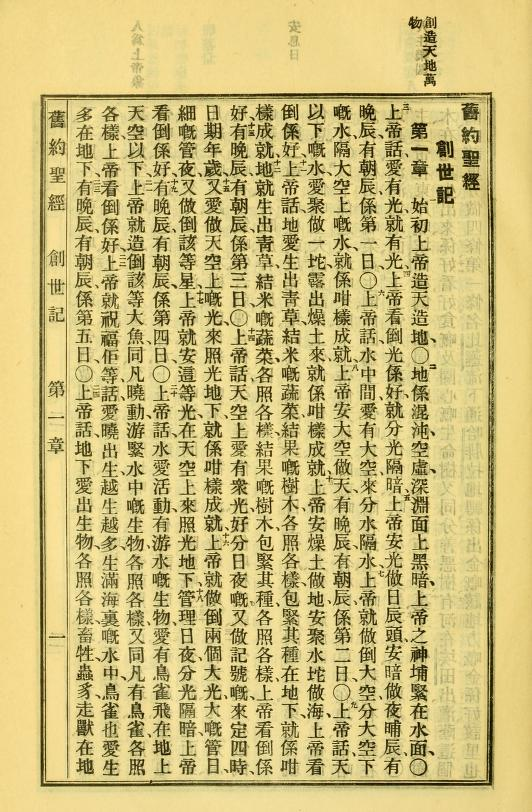
The Hakka Old and New testament Chinese character edition published in Shanghai, China in 1923.

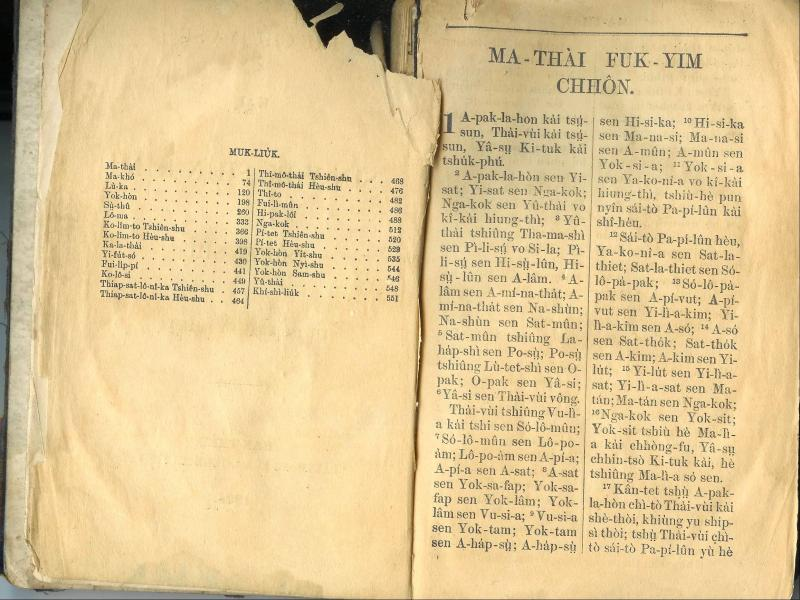
The Hakka New Testament published in Shantou, China in 1924.

The English Presbyterian Mission (EPM) was the evangelical organization formed by the English Presbyterians for overseas missions. Their earliest missionaries to China included Reverend William Chalmers Burns whom arrived in Xiamen (known at the time as Amoy) and Reverend George Smith following 10 years later The mission field established by Burns soon became a prosperous one with chapels, schools and hospitals created by fellow workers. For main mission districts were formed by the Presbyterians: The Xiamen District, the Shantou District, the Tainan District and the 'Hakka District'. Within the Hakka District, three mission points were established at Wujingfu (Modern day Jiexi County), Sanhe (modern day Dabu County, and Shanghang County.

In 1856, the English Presbyterian Mission began sending its members to evangelize in the Chaoshan area and the following year, George Smith established a mission station in Shantou and by 1871 he had entered the Hakka speaking Jiexi County and Hepuo. At Hepuo, he built a chapel. He then return to Britain and recruited two of his colleagues from Aberdeen University - Donald MacIver and William Riddel arriving in China during 1879 and 1880 respectively; both of whom can be regarded as one of the earliest English pioneers to evangelize the Hakka people.

In 1905, the first publication of Romanized Hakka Dictionary was made at Shantou by Donald MacIver of the English Presbyterian Mission with the dialect being based on the north-eastern regions of Guangdong Province such as Jiaying Prefecture (modern day Meizhou)

In 1923, the British and Foreign Bible Society published the revised "Hakka Old and New Testament Bible" (written in Hakka Chinese characters) in Shanghai. It was these British missionaries whom also helped translate the complete New testament into Romanized Hakka using the Pha̍k-fa-sṳ orthography (whereas the Basel missionaries had previously used the Lepsius Romanization for writing in Hakka). It was published in 1924 by English Presbyterian Mission Press in Shantou with the title "Kiu-chú Yâsu kaì Sin-yok Shìn-kin", meaning "The New Testament of Our Saviour Jesus" and printed for the British and Foreign Bible Society. Due to Shantou being situated between the Hokkien and Cantonese speaking populations, the Hakka language used in that region because the main transmission centre for the Hakka language during that period.

=== Adoption of Romanized Hakka in Taiwan ===
After the publishing of Hakka New Testament in Shantou in the 1920s, the church in Taiwan sent Pastor Chung Tien-zhi, a Hakka from Miaoli County, to Shantou and began learn the Romanized Cantonese alphabet. This learning experience enabled him to help the Taiwan Hakka Christians to compile their own dialect version of the Bible. Pastor Chung brought the Shantou Hakka Bible copies to Taiwan, but the substantial variances between the Hakka dialects, the Taiwanese Hakka population were unable to fully adopt it, and the low reception resulted in fewer people during that period ever becoming aware of the existence of the Shantou Hakka Bible version.

The western missionaries based in Taiwan at the time were focused mostly on using the Romanized Hokkien (abbreviated as POJ), and so the adoption of the Romanized Hakka was slower in comparison. However, not all missionaries in Taiwan focused their attention solely on the Hokkien population. In 1930, publications in Romanized Hakka such as the "Kóng-tung Chhu̍k Thong-sín" meaning the "Guangdong Tribe News" began appearing in the periodic Taiwan Presbyterian Church Newsletter Publications with the last publication (613th) made in April 1936. The Second Sino-Japanese War beginning in 1937 brought stricter measures into force, and along with the outlawing of romanized Taiwanese, both Hokkien and Hakka, various publications were prohibited. All private schools that taught Classical Chinese or any form of romanized pronunciation were closed down in 1939. The Japanese authorities came to perceive the romanized script as an obstacle to Japanization and also suspected that POJ was being used to hide "concealed codes and secret revolutionary messages". In the climate of the ongoing war, the government banned the Taiwan Church News in 1942 as it was written in POJ and also because of its perceived association with the British, who were then at war with Japan.

=== Today's Taiwan Hakka Version ===
After the end of the Second World War, the Japanese were no longer in control of Taiwan and hence the restrictions on using the Romanized alphabet were eased. The first translation period of the Bible into the Romanized Taiwanese Hakka dialect were undertaken from 1956 to 1972 and the translations were based on other previously existing Romanised Bible version. For Hakka Chinese character translations, portions of it were based on the Chinese Union Version Bible. In 1965, the Gospel of John alone was translated.

The second translation period began on May 10, 1984, with the formation of the "Hakka Bible Translation Committee" with members from the Bible Society in Taiwan, the Presbyterian Church in Taiwan, and the Presbyterian Church of Canada in joint cooperation after Reverend Thomas Lee had convened with the Hakka Pastors and Elders. The Canadian Presbyterian Church also sent a team of scholars acquainted with the Hebrew Bible and the Greek Septuagint to improve the accuracy and clarity of the text being translated. The "Taiwanese Hakka New Testament" along with the Book of Psalms were published in 1993.

Work on the Old Testament was more challenging since the translators had to figure out what the Hakka equivalent for ‘seal’ or ‘signet ring’ should be, whether the land of "Sinim" refers to a place in Egypt or to China, and how the Lord ‘roars’ and ‘thunders’. The translation of the Old Testament in both the Chinese characters and Romanized Hakka Pha̍k-fa-sṳ orthography was finally completed and published on April 22, 2012. This is the first time in history that the entire Hakka Bible is available in the Romanized script (The 1923 Old & New Testament Bible contained only Chinese characters and the 1924 Hakka New Testament did not have the Old Testament).

== Online Versions ==
The TTHV is readily available online, with the New Testament text available together in both Romanized Hakka and Audio form. The New Testament text online is available only in Hakka Chinese characters (Big5) and does not fully display all the characters needed to typeset the Chinese characters of the TTHV.

== See also ==
- Christianity in Taiwan
- Taiwanese Hakka
- Hakka language
