= Bible translations into Chinese =

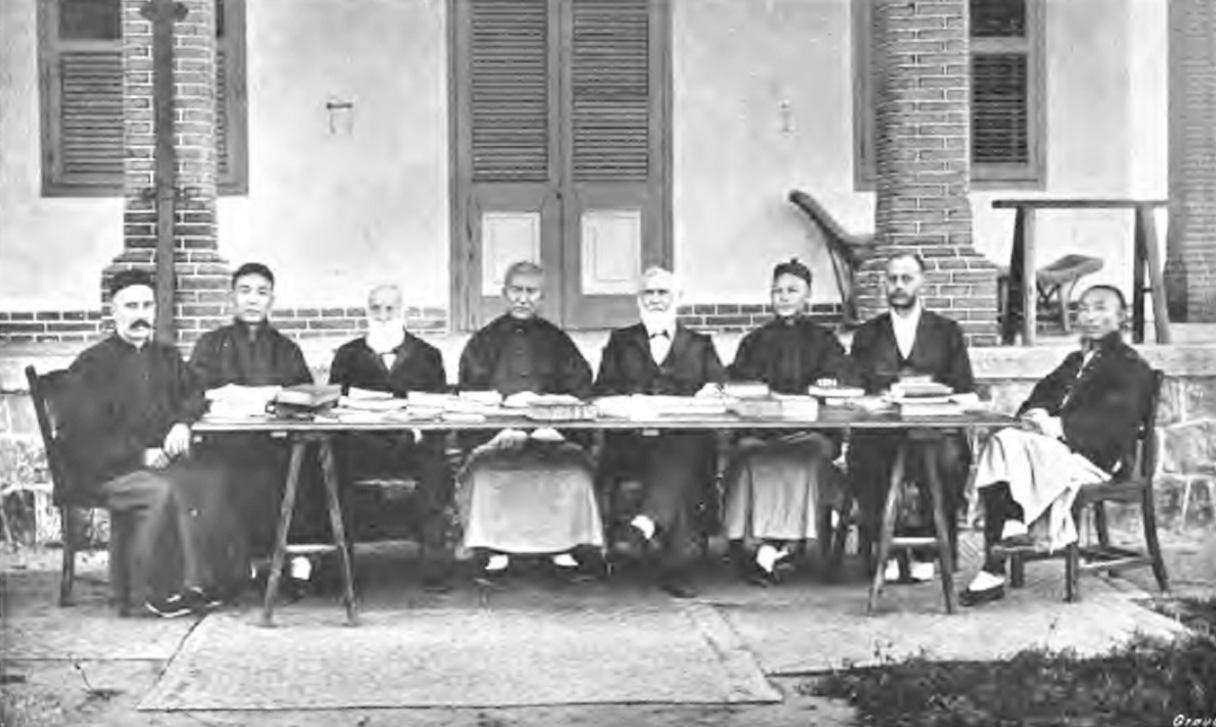
The Union Version Committee in 1906, from left to right: Frederick W. Baller, Liu Dacheng, Chauncey Goodrich, Zhang Xixin, Calvin Wilson Mateer, Wang Yuande, Spencer Lewis, and Li Chunfan

Since the arrival of Christianity in China, the Bible has been translated into many varieties of the Chinese language, both in fragments and in its totality. The first translations may have been undertaken as early as the 7th century AD, but the first printed translations appeared only in the nineteenth century. Progress on a modern translation was encumbered by denominational rivalries, theological clashes, linguistic disputes, and practical challenges at least until the publication of the Protestant Chinese Union Version in 1919, which became the basis of standard versions in use today.

Although the motive for making translations was to spread the Gospel, there were further consequences. Access to the Bible in their own language made it easier for Chinese to develop forms of Christianity not dependent on missionaries and foreign churches. Translations designed to be read aloud were significant not only for Christian believers, but for Chinese who wanted models for writing in the vernacular. Since regional languages or dialects could not be adequately written using Chinese characters, phonetic systems and type faces had to be invented; Christian texts were often the first works to be printed in those languages. The task of translation motivated missionaries to study Chinese closely, contributing to the development of Sinology. The Bible, especially the Old Testament, also offered Chinese revolutionaries such as the leaders of the nineteenth-century Taiping Rebellion an apocalyptic vision of social justice on which to base their claims.

== Original Nestorian translations ==
Christianity was introduced to China by the Church of the East, also called the Nestorian Church, in the 7th century and they appear to have begun translating the Bible immediately. The Xi'an Stele, erected by the Nestorians in 781, refers to "the translation of the Scriptures" (經, 'classics') without specifying what they were. Another Christian Chinese document from Dunhuang, Zūnjīng (尊經), lists several books of the Bible by Chinese titles: the Book of Moses, Zechariah, the Epistles of Saint Paul and Revelation. Despite Nestorian efforts to translate or paraphrase parts of the Bible into Chinese, there has been little evidence to suggest that complete translations of any book of the Bible was undertaken.

== Early Catholic efforts ==
The earliest records of Jesuit engagement with translation into Chinese date back to the early 17th century and Matteo Ricci. Although no record exists of any full Bible translation into Chinese by Ricci, among the most influential of writings was his presentation of 'Bible selections' (Chinese: 聖經約錄; pinyin: Shèngjīng Yuēlù) from 1605. These were integrated into catechetical writings that circulated among Chinese literati. Other paraphrases e.g. of the Beatitudes were distributed.

By the 18th century, Catholic translation efforts became more explicitly scriptural, culminating in more sustained attempts at translation. Jean Basset translated the Gospels, the Acts of the Apostles, the Pauline epistles and the first chapter of the Epistle to the Hebrews from the Latin Vulgate into Classical Chinese with a local convert, Johan Su, first mentioning his intention to do so in a letter dated September 1704. One of the original manuscripts, a Gospel harmony, would find its way to the nascent British Museum, and pave the way for 19th century Protestant efforts. This manuscript is currently held by Cambridge University Library; the other extant scriptural manuscript is at the Biblioteca Casanatense in Rome.

One figure in this later phase was Louis Antoine de Poirot, who translated substantial portions of the Latin Vulgate into a Beijing-colored written vernacular Chinese (and in parallel efforts, Manchu), rather than into Classical Chinese. His manuscripts, collectively entitled Chinese: 古新聖經; pinyin: Gǔxīn Shèngjīng in his preface, include the entire New Testament, and a majority of the books of the Old Testament. They are kept in several locations, the most complete manuscript being located at the Bibliotheca Zi-Ka-Wei, Shanghai. Other manuscripts can be found at the Church of the Saviour, Beijing; the Fu Ssu-nien Library, Academia Sinica, Taipei; and the Studium Biblicum Franciscanum, Hong Kong. A mixed Manchu-Chinese version is at the Institute of Oriental Studies, St. Petersburg and at the British and Foreign Bible Society in London.

== Early 19th-century Protestant translations ==
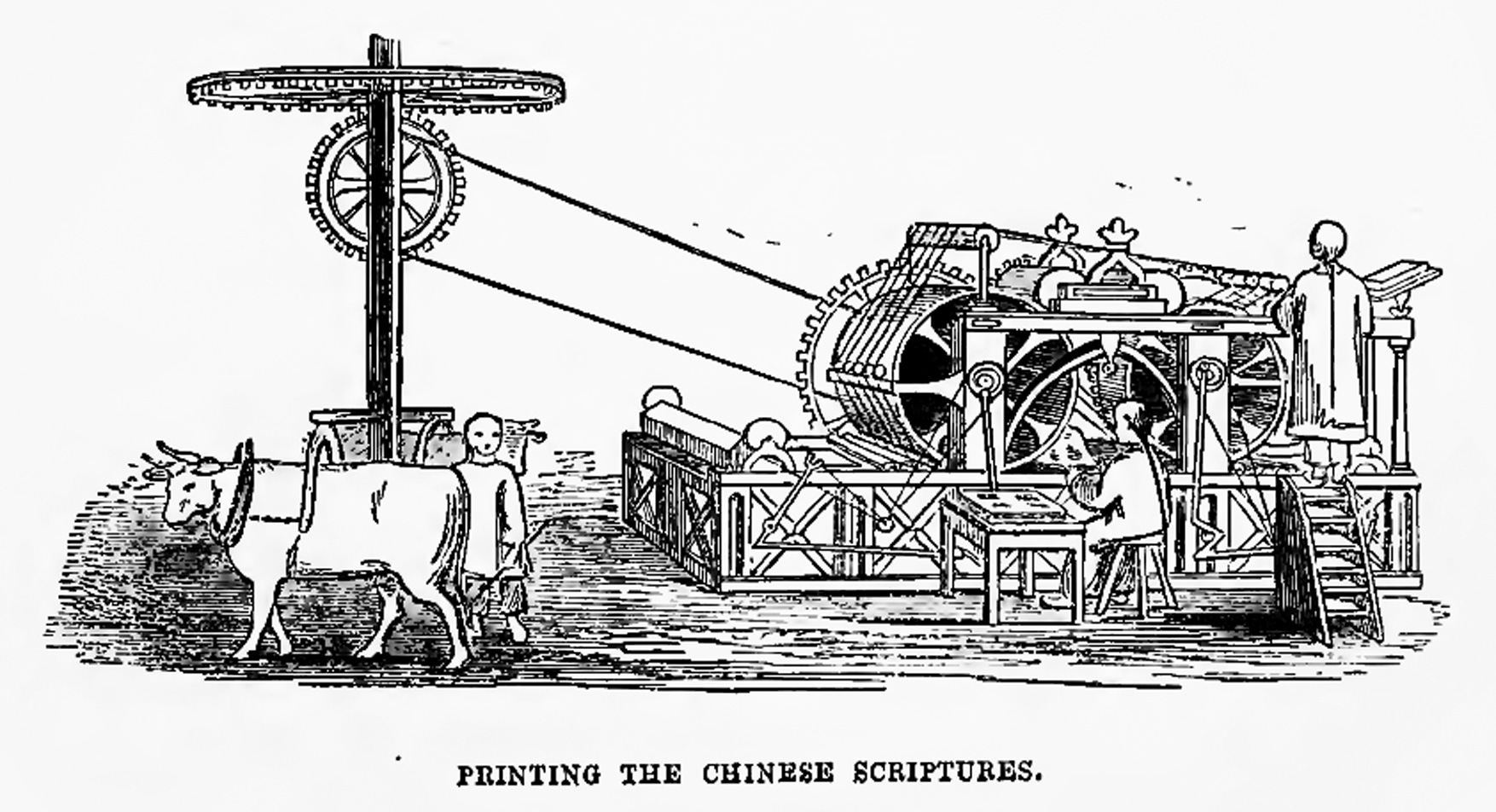
A lithograph illustrating printing of Chinese Bibles

Protestant missionaries pioneered the translation into local and regional languages, as well as the printing, and distribution of Bibles. In the nineteenth century, missionaries translated the Bible and taught it in churches and colleges, providing a resource to spread knowledge of the Christian religion. By the twentieth century, Chinese scholars and preachers studied and quoted the Bible, contributing to distinctive forms of Chinese Christianity. The early Protestant translations were made by individuals, sometimes in consultation with others or using manuscript translations from earlier workers.

The first Protestant effort was made around 1800 by William Willis Moseley, of Daventry, in Northamptonshire, England. He found, in the British Museum, a manuscript translation in Chinese of a Harmony of the four Gospels, the Acts, and all of Paul's Epistles. He then published A Memoir on the Importance and Practicability of Translating and Printing the Holy Scriptures in the Chinese Language; and of circulating them in that vast Empire.

The Archbishop of Canterbury recommended that the Society for the Promotion of Christian Knowledge print the Chinese Bible; but, after four years deliberation, the project was abandoned. Then, two independent and almost simultaneous efforts were made. The Anglo-Hindoo College, of Fort William, in Calcutta, established in 1800, created a department devoted to the translation of the Scriptures into Asian languages, mainly the Indian vernaculars, but including Chinese. Professor Hovhannes Ghazarian (Lassar), an Armenian, born and educated in Macau, began by translating the Gospel of St. Matthew, which he finished in 1807. Ghazarian then moved to Serampore, where the work was continued under the care of Joshua Marshman. The British and Foreign Bible Society published The New Testament in 1813, and the whole Bible in 1822. This was the first known entire printed version of the Scriptures in Chinese.

While Marshman's work was progressing at Serampore, Robert Morrison pursued the same project in Canton. Morrison, sponsored by the London Missionary Society, had arrived in 1807 as the first Protestant missionary to China. The translation of the Scriptures became his primary task because public preaching of the Gospel in the Chinese Empire was prohibited. Before leaving England he had made a copy of the manuscript Harmony of the Gospels referred to above, which he used as the basis of his translation of the New Testament, completed in 1813. He was joined by William Milne, but a few days after his arrival in Macau he was compelled to leave and go to Malacca. Though separated, the two friends co-operated in translating the Old Testament; Milne translated the historical books and the Book of Job; the other books were translated by Morrison. The task was finished in November, 1819, and was then revised by Morrison. It was printed from wood blocks and published, in 21 volumes, in 1823. The British and Foreign Bible Society contributed more than 10,000 pounds for the translation, production, and circulation of this and successive editions.

Marshman remarked that he and Robert Morrison profited greatly by each other's labors; the translation would be brought to as great perfection in twenty years as they might have been in the hand of one for the space of fifty. Yet they were never able meet face to face and compare and revise their work.

Illustration of the distribution of Bibles in China up to 1908

Morrison's version, like that of Marshman, was intended to be a faithful, literal translation, not an elegant or literary one. Morrison himself made preparation for a revision. In a letter to the Bible Society, he wrote: "I make it my daily study to correct the Chinese version of the Scriptures; and my brethren of the Ultra-Ganges Mission are requested to note down whatever may occur to them as an error or imperfection in the translation. These are sent to the college and preserved, or immediately employed, as may appear best." He hoped that his son, John Robert Morrison, would at some future time revise Morrison and Milne's translation. The death of Morrison frustrated the plan, for the son, having succeeded to his father's office as Government translator, did not have time to devote to the work.

The next translation was made by Walter Henry Medhurst, Karl Gutzlaff, and Elijah Coleman Bridgman. John R. Morrison devoted what time he could spare from his official duties. These men completed the New Testament in 1835: it would be the chief version used by Protestant groups for the next ten to twelve years. Although nominally the work of the above-named committee, Medhurst did the lion's share, and he did a final revision in 1836. He also took part in the translation of the Old Testament published by Gutzlaff in 1840. In addition to translating the Old Testament, Gutzlaff modified the version of the New Testament which he and Medhurst had prepared jointly; and he revised and printed some twelve editions of it.

The American Baptist Board of Foreign Missions requested Josiah Goddard, one of their missionaries, revise Marshman's translation. He published the revised version of the New Testament in 1853, fourteen years after his arrival in China. At his death it was found that he had made only a little progress with the Old Testament, and his work was continued by William Dean, of the same mission, residing at Bangkok. A further revision of Marshman's New Testament was made by an English Baptist missionary, T. H. Hudson, and published in 1867.

== Delegates' Version ==
In August 1843, a meeting of missionaries was held in Hong Kong to discuss the question of whether another revision of the Bible should be produced. A plan was adopted by which the services of every missionary capable of rendering aid were enlisted, and at five stations local committees were formed, to each of which a share of the work of revision was given. From these local committees, delegates were appointed to form a general committee of revision, by which the translations of the local committees were to be compared, and the version finally determined by the votes of the delegates.

The first meeting of the delegates was held in June 1847, consisting of British and American Protestant missionaries, and was aided by Chinese scholars such as Wang Tao. The translation of the New Testament was finished in July 1850 and was published with the approval of the delegates, and became known as Delegates' Version. As the translation of the Old Testament commenced, there was division in the committee, resulting in two versions. One was completed in 1853 by the English missionaries Medhurst, Stronach, and Milne, and has been called the Delegates' Version. The American missionaries Elijah Coleman Bridgman and Michael Simpson Culbertson withdrew from the committee of delegates and prepared a separate final version.

== In the Taiping Heavenly Kingdom ==
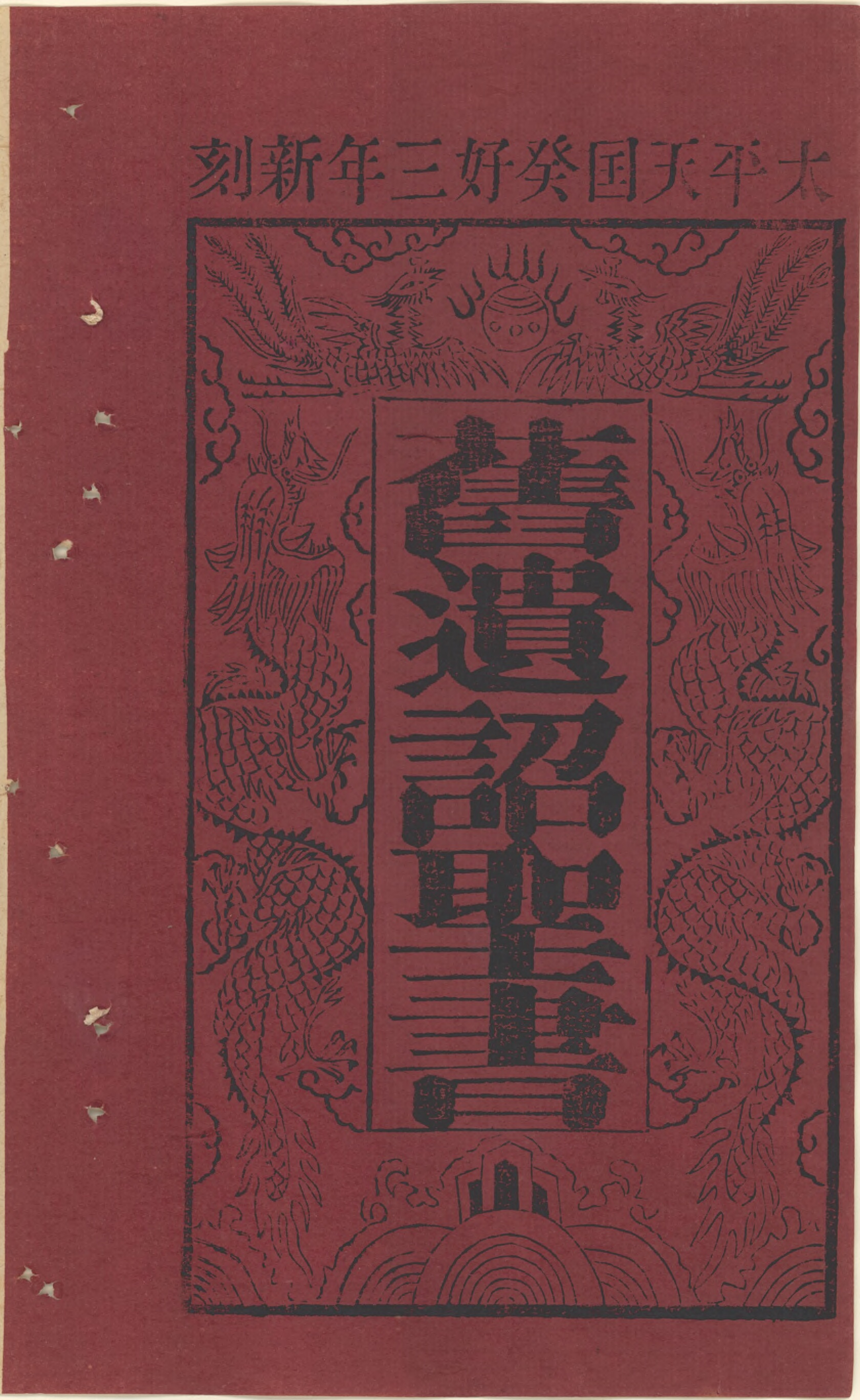
Authorized Taiping Version of the Old Testament

In 1850, Hong Xiuquan, a Hakka Chinese who had, after repeatedly failing the imperial examination, claimed to receive visions, and began to view himself as the brother of Jesus Christ, launched the Taiping Rebellion which came close to toppling the Qing dynasty and replacing it with a Syncretic Christian theocracy. Hong had trained in the Chinese classics but failed the examinations to gain government office. Hong had read parts of the Bible in a tract by Gutzlaff's assistant Liang Fa, but these selections did not give any basis for iconoclasm or rebellion against the Manchu government. Hong then studied the Old and New Testament "long and carefully" under the tutelage of an American Baptist missionary in Hong Kong in 1847. When he returned home, he used Gutzlaff's Bible as the basis of his Authorized Taiping Version of the Bible which was the religious foundation of his movement. Some of his revisions and additions were minor, such as correcting wrongly printed characters and clarifying or improving the style. Hong altered other passages to fit his own theological and moral teachings and enhance the moral authority of the scriptures for his Chinese audience. In the Taiping Bible, for instance, at Genesis 27:25 God's favored people did not drink wine. The daughters of Lot did not intoxicate him and have sexual relations with him in order to continue their family line, as in Genesis 38:16–26.

The Taiping Bible, argues historian Thomas Reilly, had a political as well as religious impact. The Gutzlaff Bible, especially the Old Testament, showed a deity who punished nations that did evil and rewarded those that did good. This deity paid close attention to cultural practices as well, including music, food, and marriage customs. The doctrines in the Taiping Bible were accepted by poor and powerless members of mid-century China because they were presented as a restoration of the authentic Chinese religion of classical antiquity, a religion which the emperors and the Confucian imperial system had destroyed.

== Late 19th century controversies and development ==
In 1865 a committee was appointed in the Chinese capital to translate the New Testament into Beijing Mandarin. The members of the committee were John Shaw Burdon, of the Church Missionary Society; Joseph Edkins, of the London Missionary Society; Samuel Isaac Joseph Schereschewsky, of the American Episcopal Church; William Alexander Parsons Martin, of the American Presbyterian Mission, and Henry Blodget of the American Board of Foreign Missions. This version became known as the Peking Committee's Version (Chinese: 京委版; pinyin: Jīng wěi bǎn), and would be the first Bible translation in written vernacular Chinese as used in Beijing. The task took several years, with the New Testament completed over several volumes in 1870. A complete edition of the New Testament was produced after revision in 1872.

Schereschewsky, the Episcopal bishop of Shanghai, had the benefit of training in Hebrew as a Jewish youth in Europe before his conversion and American seminary study. His explanations for the translations of controversial terms influenced later versions.

The National Bible Society of Scotland sponsored a translation of the New Testament by Griffith John of Hankou. The Delegates version, while attractively literary, was considered too learned to be understood by ordinary Chinese. On the other hand, the Mandarin colloquial version was not in a style which Chinese think should be employed in writing on a sacred subject. John's translation aimed to strike a happy medium between the two.

In the midst of these controversies, H. L. Mackenzie, a medical missionary who was stationed at the English Presbyterian Church's Swatow Mission in China, was actively translating the scriptures into the Swatow dialect. Mackenzie, who worked alongside other missionaries such as George Smith and J.C. Gibson, specifically undertook the task of translating the Epistles of John and Jude from the New Testament.

== Major translations by denomination ==
=== Protestant ===
A new effort was inaugurated in 1890 to provide a translation which was both accurate and appealing. Three versions were planned—two classical Chinese versions and a vernacular Mandarin Chinese version. The project was completed in 1919, culminating in the Chinese Union Version.

Lu Zhenzhong translated a version in the 1950s. The 1970s saw a number of new Chinese versions: Today's Chinese Version (TCV), Chinese New Version (CNV), Chinese Living Bible (CLB), which was later replaced by the Chinese Contemporary Bible (CCB), but of these only the TCV received official approval in the PRC and was printed inside China. The main version in use among Protestants in China remains the Chinese Union Version (CUV).

The China Christian Council approved a revision of the CUV in 2003, and the revised CUV New Testament was published by the state owned Amity Press in Nanjing in 2006, and the full Bible in 2010.

The Trinitarian Bible Society has published a Chinese translation of the New Testament in 2022 and translation work on the Old Testament is ongoing. The translation makes use of the same underlying source texts as Robert Morrison's Chinese translation and the Peking Committee Bible, while maintaining as much continuity with the Chinese Union Version as possible.

=== Catholic ===
The only approved Chinese Catholic Bible version is Studium Biblicum.

The Bible did not play a primary role in Church preaching in sixteenth-century Europe or in the first Jesuit missions to China; translating scripture was not a major concern. The Jesuit missionaries in Beijing were granted permission in 1615 to conduct mass in the vernacular and to translate sacred texts, though not into the vernacular but into "erudite language proper to the literati". Jesuit superiors in Beijing, however, determined that it would be more useful to translate other works than the Bible, though they made translations of the Ten Commandments, the Sermon on the Mount, a catechism based on the Bible, and a life of Christ. Chinese could therefore have a reasonable knowledge of Biblical matters even though there was no published translation of the book itself. The first translations were not until the eighteenth century and were made by individual priests on their own initiative. Neither of the two known translations was complete and neither was published. The British Museum acquired a manuscript copy of the first translation, which Robert Morrison had copied and used as a reference for his own work.

A translation of the New Testament was begun by Jean Basset, but was only completed down to the first chapter of Hebrews at his death in December 1707. Several manuscripts circulated, one winding up in the British Museum, from where it influenced Robert Morrison's Protestant translation work. Basset's translation was made from the Vulgate and not the original languages.

The first Catholic Chinese Bible to be published was started by a young Franciscan friar named Gabriele Allegra, who began translating the Old Testament from the original Hebrew and Aramaic languages in 1935, completing the first draft of the Old Testament in 1944. Unsatisfied with this draft, the next year he recruited Friars Solanus Lee, Antonius Lee, Bernardinus Lee, and Ludovicus Liu and established the Studium Biblicum Franciscanum in Beijing. However, due to the Chinese Civil War in 1948, the friars were forced to move the Studium Biblicum to Hong Kong. After twenty years of effort, the first Old Testament was published in 1954. In 1968 the New and Old Testaments were published in a single volume.

John C. H. Wu, a Catholic convert, who served as the Republic of China's minister to the Vatican, also made a translation of the New Testament and the Psalms into Classical Chinese in 1946. The translations were not direct and often noted to be florid, and his translation of the Psalms were paraphrases.

=== Orthodox ===
Three major Orthodox translations of the New Testament have been produced.

The first translation was done by Archimandrite Gury (Karpov), head of the 14th Russian Ecclesiastical Mission in Beijing (1858–1864). He commenced translation work from the Slavonic in 1859, completing a draft after four years. This was improved through the participation of several Chinese and ultimately published in the summer of 1864.

An updated version of the New Testament was prepared through the work of Archimandrite Flavian (Gorodecky), the head of the 16th Russian Ecclesiastical Mission (1879–1883). Flavian introduced the use of the Chinese language in services and the work to update Gury's translation of the New Testament in 1884. The update included short explanatory notes, particularly connected with the translation of theological terminology. Additionally, it was reported that the update to Gury's translation was partly done with the help of the Protestant translation of the Bible done by Samuel Isaac Joseph Schereschewsky.

The third major Orthodox translation of the New Testament was done as part of the 18th Russian Ecclesiastical Mission, led by Innokenty (Figurovsky), Bishop of Pereyaslav, later Metropolitan of Beijing and China. Again updating the work of Gury, the translation was published in 1910 including more commentaries and using the language closer to vernacular Chinese.

=== Jehovah's Witnesses ===
The Chinese New World Translation of the Christian Greek Scriptures was first published in 1995. The complete New World Translation in Chinese was released in 2001. A simplified Chinese Bible along with Pinyin, text rendered in the Roman alphabet, was published in 2004.

On July 5, 2019 Jehovah's Witnesses released a Revised New World Translation of the Holy Scriptures in Chinese Traditional and Simplified at a regional convention at the National Taiwan Sport University Stadium in Taoyuan City, Taiwan. A total of 12,610 people, including viewers tied in at four other conventions, attended this momentous occasion.

=== Comparison table ===
Translation	John 3:16	pinyin
Delegates' Version (Protestant, 1850)	16 蓋上帝以獨生之子賜世、俾信之者免沉淪、而得永生、其愛世如此、	16 Gài Shàngdì yǐ dú shēng zhī zǐ cì shì, bǐ xìn zhī zhě miǎn chén lún, ér dé yǒngshēng, qí ài shì rúcǐ,
Peking Committee's Version (Protestant, 1870 [NT])	16 天主憐愛世人、甚至將獨生子賜給他們、呌凡信他的不至滅亡、必得永生。	16 Tiānzhǔ lián'ài shìrén, shènzhì jiāng dúshēngzǐ cì gěi tāmen, jiào fán xìn tā de bù zhì mièwáng, bì dé yǒngshēng.
Chinese Union Version (Protestant, 1919)	16 神愛世人，甚至將他的獨生子賜給他們，叫一切信他的，不至滅亡，反得永生。	16 Shén ài shìrén, shènzhì jiāng tā de dúshēngzǐ cì gěi tāmen, jiào yīqiè xìn tā de, bù zhì mièwáng, fǎn dé yǒngshēng.
Studium Biblicum Version (Catholic, 1968)	16 天主竟這樣愛了世界，甚至賜下了自己的獨生子，使凡信他的人不至喪亡，反而獲得永生，	16 Tiānzhǔ jìng zhèyàng àile shìjiè, shènzhì cì xiàle zìjǐ de dúshēngzǐ, shǐ fán xìn tā de rén bùzhì sàngwáng, fǎn'ér huòdé yǒngshēng,
Today's Chinese Version (Protestant, 1975)	16 上帝那麼愛世人，甚至賜下他的獨子，要使所有信他的人不致滅亡，反得永恆的生命。	16 Shàngdì nàme ài shìrén, shènzhì cì xià tā de dúzǐ, yào shǐ suǒyǒu xìn tā de rén bùzhì mièwáng, fǎn dé yǒnghéng de shēngmìng.
New World Translation (Jehovah's Witnesses, 2001)	16 上帝深愛世人，甚至賜下自己的獨生子，好叫凡信從他的人都不致滅亡，反得永生。	16 Shàngdì shēn ài shìrén, shènzhì cì xià zìjǐ de dúshēngzǐ, hǎo jiào fán xìncóng tā de rén dōu bùzhì mièwáng, fǎn dé yǒngshēng.
Revised Chinese Union Version (Protestant, 2006 revision)	16 神愛世人，甚至將他獨一的兒子賜給他們，叫一切信他的人不致滅亡，反得永生。	16 Shén ài shìrén, shènzhì jiāng tā dú yī de érzi cì gěi tāmen, jiào yīqiè xìn tā de rén bùzhì mièwáng, fǎn dé yǒngshēng.
Revised New World Translation (Jehovah's Witnesses, 2019)	16 上帝深愛世人，甚至賜下自己的獨生子，讓所有信從的人都不致滅亡，反而得到永遠的生命。	16 Shàngdì shēn ài shìrén, shènzhì cì xià zìjǐ de dúshēngzǐ, ràng suǒyǒu xìn cóng tā de rén dōu bùzhì mièwáng, fǎn'ér dédào yǒngyuǎn de shēngmìng.
Trinitarian Bible Society Version (Protestant, 2022)	16 上帝如此愛世界，以致賜下他的獨生子，使一切信他的，不至滅亡，反得永生。	16 Shàngdì rúcǐ ài shìjiè, shènzhì cì xià tā de dúshēngzǐ, shǐ yīqiè xìn tā de, bù zhì mièwáng, fǎn dé yǒngshēng.

== Regional and minority languages ==
Since regional languages or dialects could not be adequately written using Chinese characters, missionaries and church leaders invented systems of phonetic transcription, syllabaries, or romanizations in order to write and print Christian texts and Bibles. These were in most cases the first works printed in those languages, as in Bible translations into Taiwanese. A similar need led to the invention of several systems for Braille. Missionaries invented writing systems for tribal and minority peoples. At the beginning of the 20th century, the missionary Samuel Pollard invented a phonetic system for Miao and other minority languages, which is in use over a century later.

== See also ==
- Bible translations into the languages of China
- List of Bible translations by language
- List of Chinese Bible translations
