= Chinese Contemporary Bible =

Modern translation of the Bible into Chinese

- Original title: 当代圣经 (Dāngdài Shèngjīng)
- Language: Chinese
- Genre: Bible version
- Publisher: Biblica
- Publication date: 1974, 1998, 2012
- Publication place: Hong Kong, United States
- Media type: Print (hardback & paperback)

The Chinese Contemporary Bible (Chinese: 当代圣经; Chinese: 當代聖經; pinyin: Dāngdài Shèngjīng; lit. 'Contemporary Bible') is a Bible translation by Biblica (formerly the International Bible Society) of Colorado Springs, Colorado, published in 2012.

The CCB is a translation from the Greek and Hebrew, replacing the Chinese Living Bible, New Testament (Chinese: 当代福音; Chinese: 當代福音; pinyin: Dāngdài Fúyīn; lit. 'Contemporary Gospel') originally published in 1974 by Living Bibles International, then republished in 1998 by IBS. The CLB was criticized for its reliance on the English Living Bible.

== See also ==
- Chinese Bible Translations
