= Pastoral Bible (Chinese) =

Chinese edition of the Christian Community Bible

Chinese Pastoral Bible
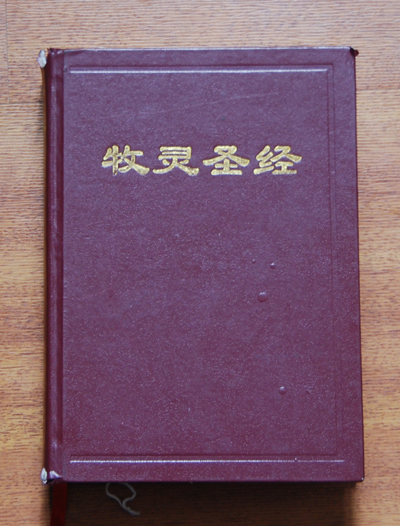
- Chinese Pastoral Bible (Simplified Chinese Version)
- Language: Traditional Chinese and Simplified Chinese
- Complete Bible published: 1999
- Derived from: Christian Community Bible
- Publisher: Claretian Communications
- Religious affiliation: Catholic Church
- Website: pbible.org
- Genesis 1:1–3 1元始之初，天主创造天地时， 2大地一片混沌，无形无样，深渊之上是一片漆黑，天主的神在水面上运行。 3天主说：“要有光！”光就有了。 John 3:16 看！ 天主那么爱世界！ 他把自己的唯一圣子赐给世界，令相信他的人不致丧亡，反得永生。

The Chinese Pastoral Bible (Chinese: 牧靈聖經 or Chinese: 牧灵圣经; pinyin: mùlíng shèngjīng; jyutping: muk6 ling4 sing3 ging1) is the Chinese edition of the Christian Community Bible. Work on the translation began in 1991, took 5 years to finish, and the completed translation was published in 1999. This translation is available in both traditional and simplified Chinese.

== See also ==
- Chinese Bible Translations
- Christian Community Bible
- Chinese Union Version
- Studium Biblicum Version
