= Gabriele Allegra =

20th-century Franciscan friar and scholar

Blessed Gabriele Allegra 雷永明 OFM
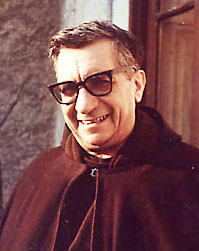
- Born: Giovanni Stefano Allegra; 26 December 1907; San Giovanni la Punta, Catania, Italy
- Died: 26 January 1976 (aged 68); British Hong Kong, British Empire
- Venerated in: Roman Catholic Church
- Beatified: 29 September 2012, Catania, Sicily, Italy, by Cardinal Angelo Amato, representing Pope Benedict XVI
- Feast: 26 January

Gabriele Allegra (Chinese: 雷永明, 26 December 1907 – 26 January 1976) was a Franciscan friar and Biblical scholar. He is best known for accomplishing the first complete translation of the Bible into the Chinese language. His Studium Biblicum Translation is often considered the definitive Chinese Bible among Catholics. He was beatified in 2012.

== Life ==
Giovanni Stefano Allegra was born the eldest of eight children, in San Giovanni la Punta in the province of Catania, Italy. He entered the Franciscan minor seminary at S. Biagio in Acireale in 1918, taking the name "Gabriele Maria", and the novitiate in Bronte in 1923. He then studied at the Franciscan International College of St. Anthony in Rome from 1926, now known as the Pontifical University Antonianum.

In 1928 he attended the celebrations of the 6th centenary of another Franciscan, Giovanni di Monte Corvino, who had attempted a first translation of the Bible in Beijing in the 14th century. On that day, at the age of 21, Allegra was inspired to translate the Bible into Chinese, a task that took the next 40 years of his life. He was ordained a priest in 1930 and soon thereafter received orders to sail for mainland China.

== Mission to China ==
Young Allegra (left) as he first arrived in China.

Allegra arrived at the mission in Hunan, southern China, in July 1931 and started to learn Chinese. In 1932, he was rector of the minor seminary of Heng Yang. With the help of his Chinese teacher, he prepared a first draft of the translation of the Bible around 1937. He was fatigued from the translation effort and had to return to Italy for three years, where he continued his studies in biblical languages and biblical archaeology.

In 1940, he left Italy again and sailed from San Francisco for Japan on his way to China. In Kobe, he met the French Jesuit priest Teilhard de Chardin for the first time. He attempted to return to Hunan again, but the Second Sino-Japanese War had already started, and he was forced to go further north to Beijing instead. During his trip through the Japanese-occupied territories, he lost more than half of the translated text during the war events.

As Allegra was an Italian citizen, and the chaplain to the Italian Embassy, the Japanese did not intern him for long, and he was able to continue his translation work. As of 1942, he became actively involved in assisting other missionaries to survive their internment in the Japanese internment camp at Weihsien in northern China, and managed to obtain the release of several prisoners.

== The Bible in Chinese ==
Allegra organized a team of Chinese Franciscan friars to work with him on the translation of the Bible and inaugurated the Studium Biblicum Franciscanum in Beijing in 1945, dedicating it to Duns Scotus. However, as the Chinese Civil War ended, the Chinese Communist Party took over China and Allegra and his team had to leave for Kowloon, Hong Kong in 1948.

In 1948, the first three volumes of the Old Testament were published by the Studium Biblicum Franciscanum in Chinese and over the next 12 years, eight more volumes with explanatory notes were produced by the team, including the New Testament. In 1954, along with four Chinese friars, he went to the Studium Biblicum in Jerusalem to study original biblical texts for about a year. In 1955, he was awarded a degree in Sacred Theology at the Pontifical University of the Antonianum in Rome. He lived mostly in Hong Kong thereafter, and he organized the 1st Ecumenical Bible Exhibition in Hong Kong in 1965.

At the end of 1968, the first publication of the one-volume Chinese Bible was printed. In 1975, the Chinese Bible Dictionary was published.

Allegra died in Hong Kong on 26 January 1976.

== His life and writings ==
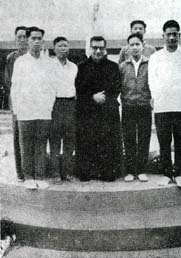
Gabriele Allegra with lepers on Macau.

His archived letters show his determination to translate the Bible into Chinese and his fascination with the study of scripture. Yet, at times, his letters show the softer side of a man who missed the sound of church bells in Rome. Nonetheless, he chose to work in the Orient until the end of his life.

=== Work to the end ===
He was known for working too hard, often resulting in the deterioration of his health. He used to say, "The most enviable fate for a Franciscan who doesn't obtain the grace of martyrdom, is to die while he is working".

In another letter, Allegra wrote: "The work upon the Bible is hard and intense, but I must work because if I stop, I will never get up again."

In Allegra's later years, he suffered severely from heart trouble and high blood pressure. A rest and recovery period was recommended in Italy, but he chose to return to the Studium Biblicum in Hong Kong to work to the end. He wrote: "Everybody thinks that I'm sick: I can still work, so let's go on! The ideal is worth more than life!"

=== Duns Scotus ===
Although Allegra's main focus was the translation of the Bible, he was also well-read on other biblical and philosophical matters. He was an expert on the philosophy of Duns Scotus and introduced Teilhard de Chardin to some aspects of it that shaped de Chardin's thoughts on the subject. His expertise on that topic was internationally respected and Oxford University invited him to give the 700th centenary lecture on Duns Scotus.

=== Other interests ===
With the publication of the Chinese Bible in 1968, Allegra found time to focus on his other interests. Alongside his scholarly interest, he took time to help the poor and the sick, particularly lepers. He frequently visited his "beloved lepers" in Macau, spending many of the holidays with them.

Allegra was a member of the Marian Movement of Priests and completed the translation of the writings of the Catholic priest Stefano Gobbi into Chinese, shortly before he died.

=== Books and memoirs ===
Allegra wrote two books, one on the primacy of Christ, the other on the Virgin Mary's Immaculate Heart. He started writing his memoirs in 1975, but died while working on them in Hong Kong in 1976.

The Church of San Biagio in Acireale, where he had entered the Franciscan seminary, holds some of his relics.

== Veneration ==
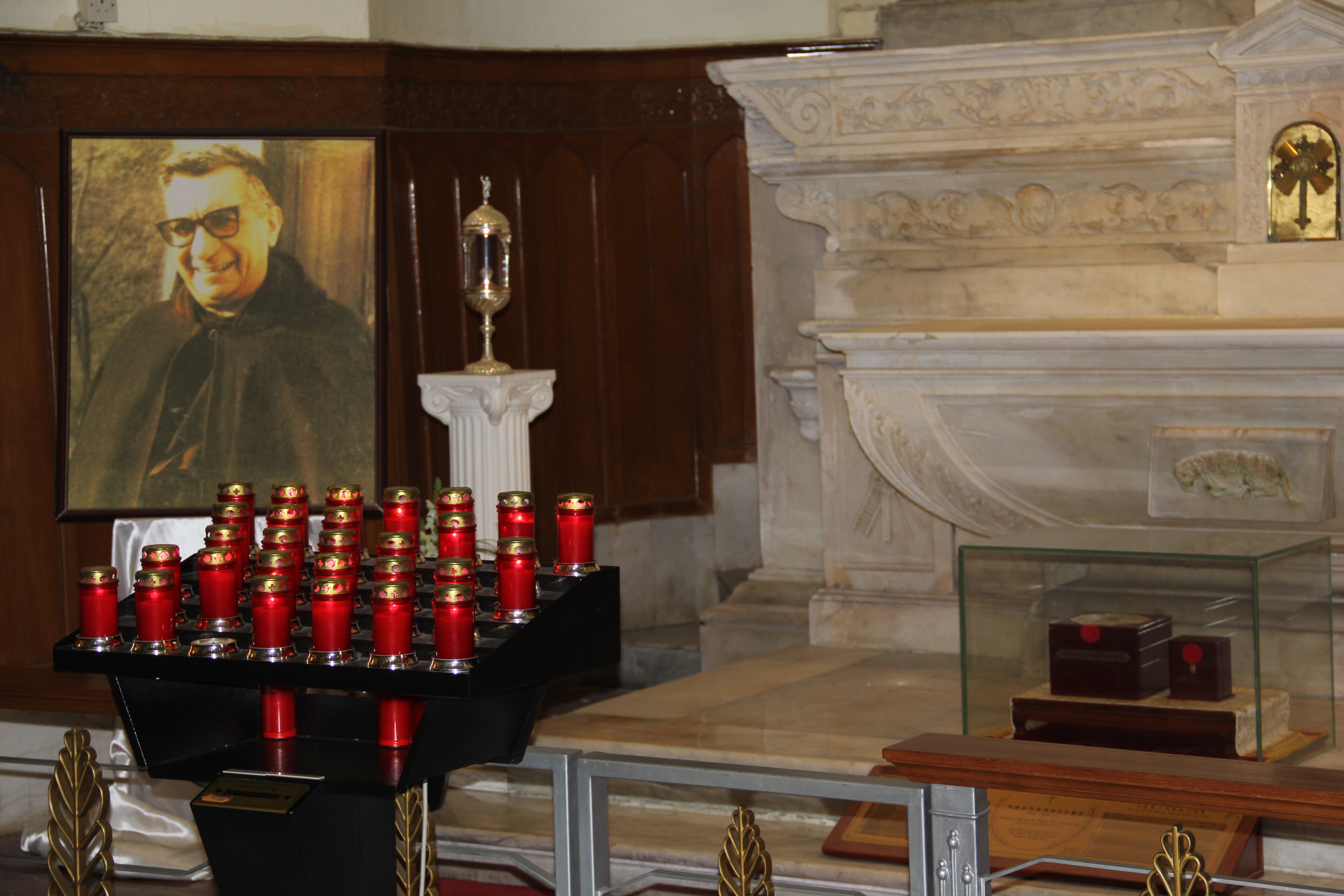
Devotion to Allegra in the Roman Catholic Cathedral of Hong Kong.

Pope Pius XII said of him: "Tell this young priest that he has my special blessing and that I will pray for him every day. He will meet with many difficulties, but let him not lose courage. Nothing is impossible for him who prays, wills and studies. I shall not live to see this work completed, but I shall pray for him in heaven."

The cause for Allegra's beatification was started in 1984 by Bishop John Wu in Hong Kong, 8 years after his death. Allegra was declared venerable by the Holy See in 1994, and the promulgation of a decree of one miracle attributed to him, required to conclude the beatification process, was approved in 2002. His decree of beatification was promulgated by the Holy See on that same day, but the beatification ceremony, which was set for 26 October of that year, was postponed. On the feast of the Assumption in 2012, the Roman Curia announced through the Sicilian Franciscan Holy Name Province that Allegra would be beatified on 29 September 2012, at the Cathedral of Arcireale, Catania in Sicily.

== Legacy ==
In 2009, a webcast in English and Chinese was named after Allegra.

The Blessed Gabriele M. Allegra OFM Fraternity is part of the International College of St. Anthony (CISA) in Rome, Italy.

== Sources ==
- Gabriele Maria Allegra and P. Teilhard de Chardin, "My conversations with Teilhard de Chardin on the Primacy of Christ": ISBN 978-0-8199-0429-4
- Gabriele Maria Allegra, "Mary's Immaculate Heart: A way to God" ISBN 0-8199-0875-4
- Massimiliano Taroni, "Beato Gabriele Allegra. Apostolo della parola di Dio in Cina", Velar 2016.
- Catholic Archives
- Studium Biblicum Franciscanum Hong Kong
- Letters of Gabriele Allegra
