= Today's Chinese Version =

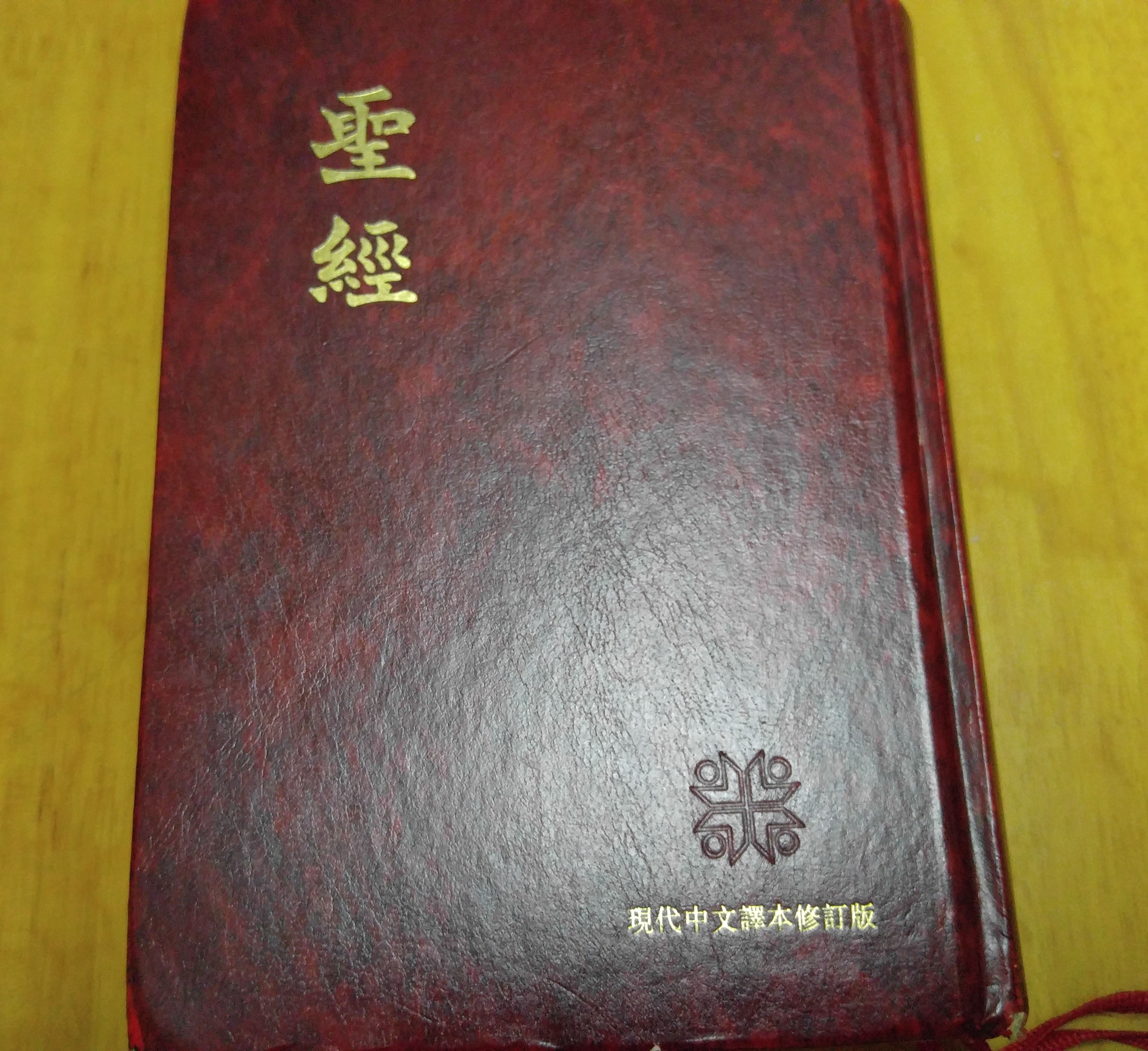
- Full name: Today's Chinese Version
- Other names: 現代中文譯本
- Abbreviation: TCV
- Language: Chinese
- OT published: 1979
- NT published: 1975
- Complete Bible published: 1979
- Derived from: Good News Bible
- Textual basis: OT: Biblia Hebraica Kittel (3rd ed.) with Septuagint influence; NT: UBS Greek New Testament (3rd ed. and 4th ed.); Novum Testamentum Graece (26th ed., 27th ed.)
- Version revision: 1985, 1997, 2017
- Publisher: United Bible Societies
- Copyright: Public domain
- Religious affiliation: Protestant
- Genesis 1:1–3 太初，上帝創造天地。大地混沌，還沒有成形。深淵一片黑暗；上帝的靈運行在水面上。上帝命令：「要有光。」光就出現。 John 3:16 上帝那麼愛世人，甚至賜下他的獨子，要使所有信他的人不致滅亡，反得永恆的生命。

The Today's Chinese Version (TCV) (Chinese: 現代中文譯本; pinyin: Xiàndài Zhōngwén Yìběn) is a recent translation of the Bible into modern Chinese by the United Bible Societies. The New Testament was first published in 1975, and the entire Bible was published in 1979. The Bible uses simple, easy to read Chinese, and avoids complex and specialist terminology. The New York Times, apparently unaware of the Studium Biblicum Version or the translation by Lü Chen Chung, hailed it as the first Mandarin translation of the Bible since 1919.

== Text ==
神那麼愛世人，甚至賜下他的獨子，要使所有信他的人不至滅亡，反得永恒的生命。

— John 3:16

TCV is published in two different versions to accommodate the different translations used by Protestants and Catholics. However, the Catholic version is virtually identical to the Protestant version, except for the translations of "Lord", "God", and "Holy Spirit", even though almost all proper names are traditionally transliterated differently.

In mainland China, the TCV is published in simplified Chinese characters by the state-owned Amity Foundation (爱德基金会) in Nanjing, although the Today's Chinese Version is produced and distributed in fewer formats than the Amity Foundation's main version, the Chinese Union Version.

== Editions ==
- 基督教圣经中英文对照修订版 现代中文译本GNT/TCV 圣经Holy Bible. 双语并排版现代英文译本/现代中文译本. 出版发行：中国基督教两会出版发行. 印刷：南京爱德印刷有限公司 2010

== See also ==
- Good News Bible
- Chinese Bible Translations
