= Michael Simpson Culbertson =

- Born: January 18, 1819; Chambersburg, Pennsylvania, United States
- Died: August 25, 1862 (aged 43); Shanghai, China
- Occupation: Presbyterian missionary
- Spouse: Mary McFarlane Dunlap
- Children: 2

Michael Simpson Culbertson (January 18, 1819 – August 25, 1862) was an American Presbyterian clergyman, missionary to China, academic and author.

== Early life ==
Michael Simpson Culbertson was born in 1819 in Chambersburg, Pennsylvania. He entered United States Military Academy at West Point, New York, on July 1, 1835. United States Military Academy graduated him 6th of 31 in the class of 1839, and he received a commission as a second lieutenant in the First Artillery on July 1, 1839. Second Lieutenant Culbertson served at Rouses Point, New York, during the Aroostook War. He served briefly as assistant professor of mathematics at United States Military Academy January 1 to February 1, 1840. Second Lieutenant Culbertson then served with the First Artillery at Fort Preble in Portland, Maine, and Hancock Barracks in Houlton, Maine.

On April 15, 1841, Second Lieutenant Culbertson resigned his commission to study theology at Princeton Theological Seminary.

== China ==
Upon his graduation in 1844, Culbertson was ordained by the Presbyterian Church and was sent as a missionary to China by the American Presbyterian Mission. He was stationed in Ningbo from 1845 to 1851 and in Shanghai from 1851 to 1862, where he acted as member of the Committee of Delegates on the revision of the Old Testament. Culbertson later withdrew from the Committee of Delegates and co-published a variant of the "Delegate's Version" with the Rev. Elijah Coleman Bridgman in 1855, with the help of Episcopal Bishop William Jones Boone. He died of cholera in Shanghai in 1862.

== Family ==
Michael Simpson Culbertson was of Irish descent, his paternal great-grandfather having emigrated from County Antrim, Ireland, to Franklin County, Pennsylvania, around the mid-18th century. His father Joseph (1779–1858) was a banker. Michael was the first born of his father's second wife, Frances (1785–1867) whom he married in 1818. He had five older brothers, and one sister from his father's previous union to Mary (died 1817). Michael had two brothers noteworthy in American history: Alexander (1809–1879), a fur trader and pathfinder for whom the town of Culbertson Montana is named; and Thaddeus Ainsworth (1823–1850), a Yale graduate, who explored with brother Alexander and authored, Journal of an expedition to the Mauvaises Terres and the Upper Missouri in 1850 Another brother, Cyrus (1812–1869) was an Officer in the Union Army during the Civil War.

Culbertson and his wife, Mary McFarlane Dunlap, had two daughters, who returned to New York with their mother upon his death. Josephine (1852–1939), born in Shanghai, China; studied art in New York, settled in Carmel, California becoming a noted artist. She co-founded the Carmel Art Association in 1927.

== Death ==
Culbertson died of cholera on August 25, 1862, in Shanghai, China, at the age of 43. His remains were brought back to Gettysburg, Pennsylvania, where he was buried on November 25, 1862. Mary Culbertson relocated to Brooklyn, New York, where she established a home for their two daughters.

== Published works ==
- Papers relating to the Shanghai revision of the Chinese scriptures (Shanghai, 1851)
- Reply to the Strictures on the remarks made on the translation of Genesis and Exodus in the revision of the Chinese scriptures (Canton, 1852)
- Essay on the bearing of the publications of the Tai-ping dynasty insurgents on the controversy respecting the proper term for translating the words Elohim and Theos in the Chinese version of the Scriptures (1853)
- The Old Testament (translated by the Rev. E. C. Bridgman and the Rev. M. S. Culbertson, 1855)
- The Religious Condition of the Chinese, and Their Claims on the Church: A Sermon Preached for the Board of Foreign Missions of the Presbyterian Church (1857)
- Darkness in the Flowery Land; or Religious Notions and Popular Superstitions in North China (New York: Scribner, 1857)
