= Studium Biblicum Version =

Chinese Catholic bible translation

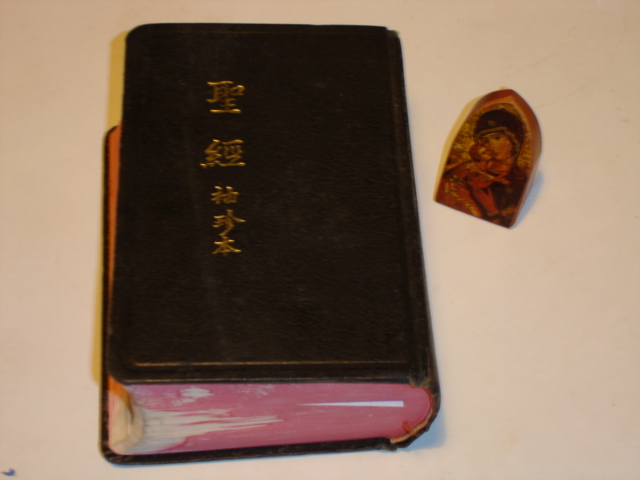
- Full name: 思高聖經譯釋本
- Complete Bible published: 1968
- Textual basis: OT: Biblia Hebraica Kittel (3rd ed.) with Septuagint influence.; Apocrypha: Septuagint (H. B. Swete) and Vulgate (Mons. L. Grammatica); NT: Augustinus Merk. Novum Testamentum: Graece et Latine. (7th ed.)
- Translation type: Direct
- Copyright: Studium Biblicum O.F.M.
- Religious affiliation: Catholic
- Genesis 1:1–3 在起初天主創造了天地。大地還是混沌空虛，深淵上還是一團黑暗，天主的神在水面上運行。天主說：「有光！」就有了光。 John 3:16 天主竟這樣愛了世界，甚至賜下了自己的獨生子，使凡信他的人不至喪亡，反而獲得永生。

Studium Biblicum Version
- Traditional Chinese: 聖經思高本
- Simplified Chinese: 圣经思高本
- Literal meaning: '(Duns) Scotus Version'
Transcriptions
Standard Mandarin
- Hanyu Pinyin: Shèngjīng Sīgāo Běn
Yue: Cantonese
- Jyutping: sing3 ging4 si1 gou1 bun2

The Studium Biblicum Version (Chinese: 思高本; pinyin: Sīgāo Běn; Jyutping: si1 gou1 bun2) is the predominant Chinese language translation of the Bible used by Chinese Catholics. It is considered by many to be the Chinese Catholic Bible.

It is known as the Sigao ben (思高本) or the Sigao Shengjing (思高聖經).

The Studium Biblicum Version is considered by many, including some Protestants, to be very faithful to the original manuscripts.

Like many Catholic bibles, this translation includes numerous footnotes. The bible includes several appendices.

The language of the Studium Biblicum Version is standard modern written Chinese, though some of the wordings may appear unnatural in Mandarin but still used in Cantonese, and might be considered unnatural by some precisely because some people do not expect such forms to be written. Standard transliterations are mostly used where they exist. In other cases, a transliteration based on Mandarin is used.

== History ==
The Studium Biblicum Version was translated by the Studium Biblicum Franciscanum in Hong Kong (a bible society not affiliated with the United Bible Societies). Translation originally started in 1935 as a personal effort by a Franciscan Friar, the Blessed Gabriele Allegra. Translation work was halted due to World War II, and part of the finished translations were lost due to the war.

The SBF society was formed in 1945 when more translators joined the translation work, including Antonius Li Shiyu, Solanus Li Zhixian, Bernardinus Li Yutang, Ludovicus Liu Xutang and Victor Zuo Weidou.

The bible society was formed in 1945 when more translators joined the translation work, and the whole bible was completed in 1968. The translation was mostly based on the original Hebrew, Aramaic, and Greek manuscripts, but occasionally on an unidentified existing translation for “difficult passages”. Postulations by modern scholars were deliberately avoided, but the Greek manuscript edited by the Protestant scholars Aland, Black, Metzger, and Allen Wikgren was used as a reference as an ecumenical gesture.

As time went on, more Chinese priests were involved in the translation, especially in the 1960s. The whole bible was completed in 1968.

== Typography of the Studium Biblicum Version ==
Text in the Studium Biblicum Version is typeset vertically from right to left. The typography is generally modern, with a small number of archaisms.

The Studium Biblicum Version uses standard Chinese punctuation. An exception is that the proper name mark and book title mark are both typeset on the right side instead of the currently-standard left. Among the old-style typography used are the use of sans serif type for emphasis, mostly for chapter and section headings, and typesetting most punctuation marks as if they were ruby annontations.

Verse numbers are typeset on the right-hand side, with the first word of each verse as ruby.

Notes are typeset as footnotes. Because it is typeset vertically, the footnotes appear on the far left side of the spread, instead of the bottom of the page.

Typesetting the proper name and book title marks on the right causes clashes with verse numbers and most punctuation marks. When clashes occur, the proper name or book title mark that causes the clash are omitted for the character with the clash. This typographic treatment causes parts of some proper names or book titles to be unmarked.

The characters used for Bible names, and consequently for many Bible books, differ from those in Protestant Chinese Bibles such as the standard Chinese Union Version. For example, "John" is 若望 (Ruòwàng) rather than the 約翰 (约翰; Yuēhàn) found in Protestant Bibles and secular sources.

== Online versions ==
As the Studium Biblicum version is not in the public domain, permission to create online versions of this translation is granted on a case-by-case basis. Online versions include those hosted on the web sites of the Chinese Regional Bishop's Conference and the Wah Yan BibleNet.

== See also ==
- Gabriele Allegra
- Chinese Bible Translations
- Chinese Union Version
- Pastoral Bible
- Today's Chinese Version
