= Lü Chen Chung =

Chinese translator (1898–1988)

Lü Chen Chung (Chinese: 呂振中; pinyin: Lü Zhènzhōng; Pe̍h-ōe-jī: Lū Chín-tiong; 13 April 1898 – 10 March 1988) was a Chinese Anglican priest, university lecturer and Bible translator. Lü Chen Chung is best known for his 30-year endeavor translating the Bible to a Chinese language version.

== Early life and education ==
Lü was born in Nan'an county of Southern Fujian, China. In 1906, due to a plague that ravaged in China, he and his two cousins were orphaned when he was eight. With full support from British Presbyterian missionary Alan S. Moore Anderson, the three orphans enrolled into Pei Yuan Middle School in Quanzhou, which Anderson had established in 1904. With exceptional results from his studies, Lü received scholarship to study at University of Hong Kong in 1916 and graduated with a bachelor of arts degree in 1921. He went back to his alma mater, Pei Yuan Middle School to teach for one year and married his wife Huang Luo Qi (黄罗绮) then. In 1922, he went to Yenching University (a.k.a. Yanjing University) to read Theology and graduated in 1925. While he was in Yenching, he also studied Hebrew and Greek, which allowed him to be an effective Hebrew Bible translator later in life.

== Career ==
Upon graduating from Yenching in 1925, Lü returned to Fujian and took up the vice-principal position at South Fukien Theological College in Gulangyu, Xiamen. During his 14-year tenure, he taught prospective pastors and research the original text of the Bible when needed.

In 1939, with the backdrop of the Second Sino-Japanese War and increasing frequency of conflicts in Xiamen, traffic between Xiamen mainland and the Gulangyu International Settlement was restricted. During this tumultuous times, Lü received a revelation and was inspired to start translating the Bible. In 1940, Lü went to back to his alma mater, Yenching University with his family to start the translation work. Additionally, he took up teaching Greek language in the university. When the university closed its doors between 1941 and 1945 due to the war, Lü and his family was hosted by Philippe de Vargas in Beiping, and Lü continued his translation efforts. Lü returned to Yenching in autumn of 1945 when it reopened after the surrender of Japanese occupation forces. In 1946, the initial edition of his New Testament translation was published by Yenching University with 500 copies in circulation. Lü encouraged criticism and suggestions to be delivered to him at the university in his foreword so that he could revise the translation further.

To further his understanding of the Bible and his translation efforts, he enrolled into Union Theological Seminary in New York in 1946 and later at Westminster College in England. He was ordained in 1948.

He returned to Beiping in autumn of 1948 to continue his translation efforts. However, he developed a severe case of asthma and could not tolerate the cold winter there. He and Huang returned back to Fujian and temporarily worked at Fukien Christian University.

In 1949, with the sponsorship from the British Bible Society, Lü and Huang went to Hong Kong to work on a revised translation of the New Testament (新约新译初稿). In 1952, the revised translation was published by the Hong Kong Bible Society. Lü shifted his focus on translating the Old Testament until 1970 when both Old and New Testaments were published by the Hong Kong Bible Society. In recognition of his translation efforts, he received an honorary Doctor of Divinity degree from Hong Kong University in 1973.

=== Bible translation sources ===
The first translation of New Testament which started in 1940, was translated from Alexander Souter's New Testament: Oxford Greek Testament.

For the 1970 translation of the Bible which was published in Hong Kong, the revised translation of the New Testament, was translated from the 17th edition of Eberhard Nestle's Novum Testamentum Graece, while the Old Testament relied on various texts such as the Masoretic Text.

== Personal life and demise ==
Lü was married to Huang Luo Qi (黄罗绮) in 1921. Huang was afflicted with Alzheimer's disease in 1975 and died in 1978 in Hong Kong. Together, they had 5 children, 3 boys and 2 girls. The two youngest, a boy and a girl died in their childhoods, while the eldest, a daughter, died in 1944. They dedicated their first son (the second child), John Lu (吕荣光) to the Lord. John went on to be the vice-moderator of the Presbyterian Church in Singapore and Malaysia in 1952. At the same time, John was also a faculty at the Trinity Theological College of Singapore, delivering lessons in Chinese. John died in 2000.

In 1983, Lü migrated to Singapore and lived with John. Lü died at age 89 in Singapore on 10 March 1988.
