= Protestantism in China =

Protestant Christianity (Chinese: 基督敎新敎; pinyin: Jīdūjiào xīnjiào; lit. 'New teachings of Christianity', in comparison to earlier Roman Catholicism) entered China in the early 19th century, taking root in a significant way during the Qing dynasty. Some historians consider the Taiping Rebellion to have been influenced by Protestant teachings. Since the mid-20th century, there has been an increase in the number of Christian practitioners in China. As of 2019, Fenggang Yang, a sociologist of religion at Purdue University, estimated that there are around 100 million Protestant Christians in China. Other estimates place the number of Protestant Christians at around 40–60 million

Much of this growth has occurred in informal networks referred to as house churches, the proliferation of which began in the 1950s when many Chinese Catholics and Protestants began to reject state-controlled structures purported to represent them. Members of such groups are now said to represent the "silent majority" of Chinese Christians and represent many diverse theological traditions.

== Early history ==
Protestant missionary work in China began in 1807. Robert Morrison began his missionary work in China that year.

The Jiaqing Emperor in 1814 AD added a sixth clause in laws prohibiting "Wizards, Witches, and all Superstitions" to add Christianity to the prohibition. This provision was modified in 1821 and printed in 1826 by the Daoguang Emperor. It sentenced Europeans to death for spreading Christianity among Han Chinese and Manchus. Christians who would not repent their conversion were sent to Muslim cities in Xinjiang, to be given as slaves to Muslim leaders and beys.

The clause stated: "People of the Western Ocean, [Europeans or Portuguese,] should they propagate in the country the religion of heaven's Lord, [name given to Christianity by the Catholics,] or clandestinely print books, or collect congregations to be preached to, and thereby deceive many people, or should any Tartars [Manchus] or Chinese, in their turn, propagate the doctrines and clandestinely give names, (as in baptism,) inflaming and misleading many, if proved by authentic testimony, the head or leader shall be sentenced to immediate death by strangulations : he who propagates the religion, inflaming and deceiving the people, if the number be not large, and no names be given, shall be sentenced to strangulation after a period of imprisonment. Those who are merely hearers or followers of the doctrine, if they will not repent and recant, shall be transported to the Mohammedan cities (in Turkistan) and given to be slaves to the beys and other powerful Mohammedans who are able to coerce them. . . . All civil and military officers who may fail to detect Europeans clandestinely residing in the country within their jurisdiction, and propagating their religion, thereby deceiving the multitude, shall be delivered over to the Supreme Board and be subjected to a court of inquiry."

Some hoped that the Chinese government would discriminate between Protestantism and Catholicism, since the law was directed at Catholicism, but after Protestant missionaries in 1835–36 gave Christian books to Chinese, the Daoguang Emperor demanded to know who were the "traitorous natives in "Canton who had supplied them with books." The foreign missionaries were strangled or expelled by the Chinese.

Protestant missionaries benefitted from increased access to China and privileges through the unequal treaties, which foreign powers required China to sign between 1842 and 1860.

In 1860, Protestant missions were confined to five coastal cities. By the end of the century, Western powers had forced the government to allow missionaries into the interior. During the second half of the century, increased numbers of missionaries entered the country. Scores of new missionary societies had been organized in the United States after the American Civil War and participation increased from Great Britain as well. Several thousand missionaries were working in all parts of China. The 1859 Awakening in Britain and the example of J. Hudson Taylor (1832–1905) were influential.

By 1865 when Hudson Taylor's China Inland Mission began, 30 different Protestant groups were working in China. The diversity of denominations represented did not equate to more missionaries on the field. In the seven provinces in which Protestant missionaries had already been working, there were an estimated 204 million people with only 91 workers, while there were eleven other provinces in inland China with a population estimated at 197 million, for whom absolutely nothing had been attempted. Besides the London Missionary Society, and the American Board of Commissioners for Foreign Missions, there were missionaries affiliated with Baptists, Southern Baptists, Presbyterians, Methodists, Episcopalians, and Wesleyans. Most missionaries came from England, the United States, Sweden, France, Germany, Switzerland, or the Netherlands.

In addition to the publication and distribution of Christian literature and Bibles, the Protestant Christian missionary movement in China furthered the dispersion of knowledge with other printed works of history and science. As the missionaries went to work among the Chinese, they established and developed schools and introduced the latest techniques in medicine. The mission schools were viewed with some suspicion by the traditional Chinese teachers, but they differed from the norm by offering a basic education to poor Chinese, both boys and girls, who had no hope of learning at a school before the days of the Chinese Republic.

The Chinese Recorder and Missionary Journal, founded in Shanghai in 1869, was a prominent outlet for reporting on the mission enterprise and for controversy and discussion.

The 1800s witnessed the expansion of Christianity beyond the isolated areas of the Treaty Ports by thousands of new missionaries who entered the interior of China. Western missionaries spread Christianity rapidly through the foreign-occupied coastal cities; the Taiping Rebellion was connected in its origins to the missionary activity. British and American denominations, such as the British Methodist Church, continued to send missionaries until they were prevented from doing so following the establishment of the People's Republic of China. Protestant missionaries played a significant role in introducing knowledge of China to the United States and the United States to China.

Protestant Christians in China established the first clinics and hospitals, provided the first training for nurses, opened the first modern schools, worked to abolish practices such as foot binding, and improve treatment of maids. They launched charitable work and distributed food to the poor. They also opposed the opium trade.

== Republic of China (1912-1949) ==
In the Republic of China era (1912–1949) Protestantism received support from the political elites. Early leaders, including Sun Yat-sen, were converts to Christianity and were influenced by its teachings. The religious policy of the ROC viewed Protestantism as a legitimate religion (at a time when Chinese religions had difficulty seeking this status from the government) and a model for other religions.

During the May Fourth Movement, Chinese intellectuals and students criticized Christianity for its associations with Western imperialism. Responding to these perspectives, some Chinese Protestant leaders began indigenous church movements seeking to establish Protestant churches in China that were independent of foreign finances, control, or leadership. Among these developments in the post-May Fourth environment was the Local Church movement led by Watchman Nee (Ni Tuosheng). Other indigenous denominations founded in the 1910s and 1920s included the True Jesus Church and the Jesus Family. Most Protestant denominations in China before 1949 were foreign denominations, however.

== People's Republic of China (since 1949) ==
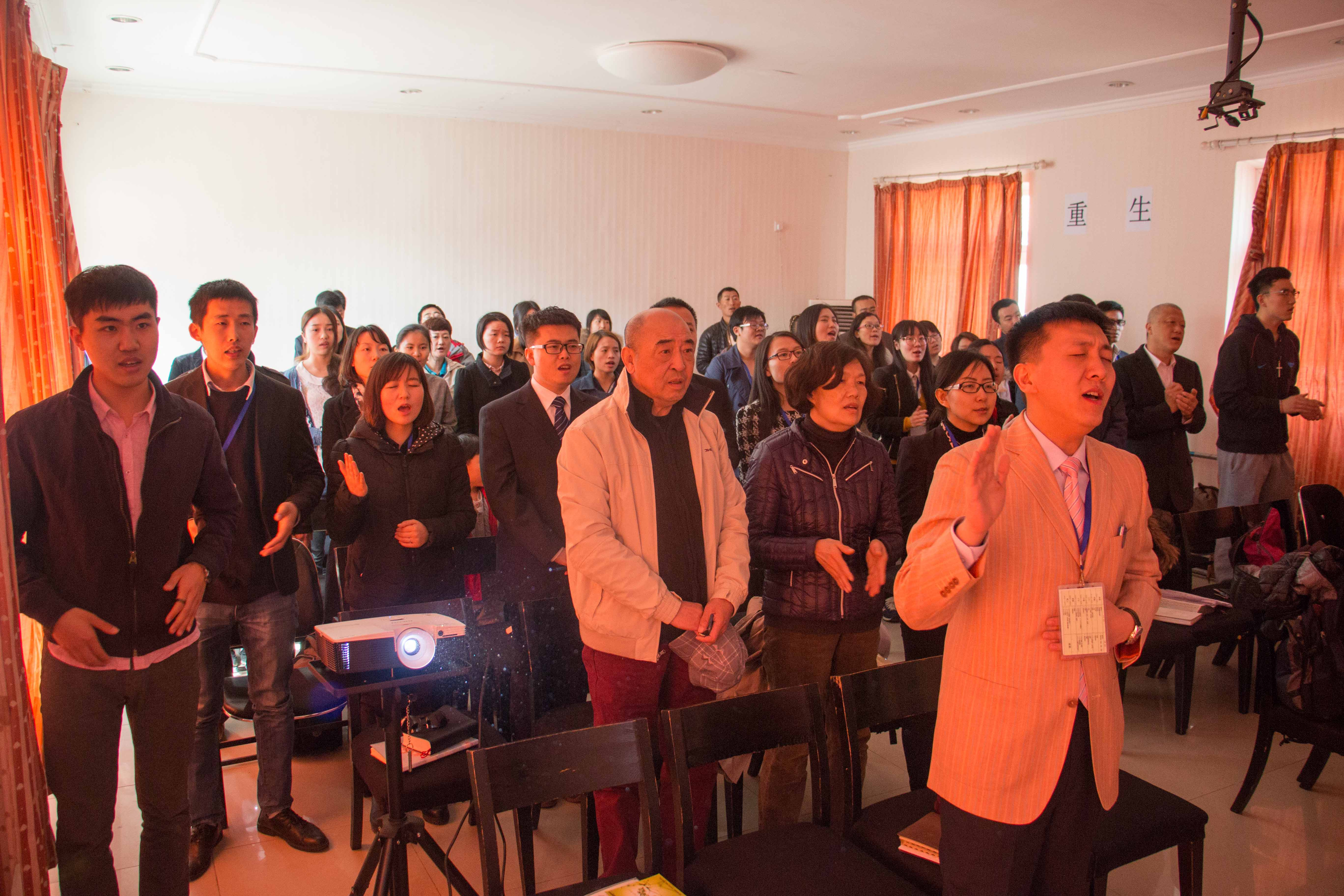
A house church in Shunyi, Beijing

In 1949, China's population included one million Protestants (0.2%). At the time of the proclamation of the PRC, this was a diverse group, including indigenous Protestant groups and liberal Protestants who were critical of the work of foreign missionaries.

Substantial portions of China's Protestant communities favored cooperation with the PRC. In 1951, Wu Yaozong published The Christian Manifesto which emphasised "self-governance, self-support, and self-propagation" for Chinese Protestants. It resulted in the Three-Self Patriotic Movement to remove foreign religious ties. Most Protestant groups in China joined the movement. Significant exceptions included groups led by Wang Mingdao and Yuan Xiangchen.

During the 1950s and 1960s, the PRC required members of different Protestant denominations or sects to worship together and essentially dismantled their hierarchies.

There was essentially no public Protestant religious practice during the Cultural Revolution's suppression of religion. Small group meetings of Protestants might occur in secret.

One consequence of the Cultural Revolution's suppression of religion was that the institutional advantages of historically deep-seated religions like Buddhism and folk religion had been decreased. In the relaxed religious environment after 1978, it was therefore easier for newer religions like Protestantism to increase their adherents. Protestant groups that emerged in the post-Mao period were more varied and less likely to be within existing denominations.

Beginning in 1978, Deng Xiaoping relaxed policies on the Protestant churches. Protestantism has been China's fastest growing religion since. In the 1980s, the number of Protestants in rural China increased rapidly. The number of urban Protestants increased rapidly in the 1990s. The growth in China's Protestants since 1978 has occurred across socioeconomic categories as well.

Estimates of Protestants in China as of 2010 varied widely. A national survey by the Chinese Academy of Social Sciences put the number at 23.05 million in 2010 (critics of the survey contend that it undercounted the number of Protestants who are not affiliated with registered churches). According to another survey published in 2010, there were approximately 40 million Protestants in China. A Pew Research Center Forum on Religion and Public Life estimate placed the number at 58 million Protestants in 2010 (4.3% of population); the Pew Study has been generally viewed favorably by both academics in China and foreign academics.

The Protestant Three-Self Patriotic Movement and China Christian Council have affiliations with government and follow the regulations imposed upon them. Three-Self Patriotic Movement by 2005 claimed to have 10–15 million worshippers, while the total number of Protestants, including unofficial house churches is calculated to be of 30 million members.

=== Suppression ===
Beginning in 2013, the government began a campaign of suppression targeting large Protestant and Catholic churches with steeples and crosses. 2018 was marked by demolition of an Evangelical church boasting 50,000 members in Linfen, Shanxi. In October 2025, the Chinese government arrested dozens of Zion Church members in Beijing, Shanghai, Shenzhen, and other cities.

=== Protestant worship in the present ===
The Chinese Union Version of the Bible, the Chinese New Hymnal, the Lord's Prayer as it is written in the Chinese Union Version and the Apostles' Creed are usually used by most Protestant worshipers in present-day China.

The hymnal Canaan Hymns is one of the most successful underground Christian publications in China. In addition to house churches, it is used in Three-Self Patriotic Movement churches.

The trend in the post-Mao era has been that Protestant churches in China have become more local, more independent, and less tied to denominational structures than was historically the case in China.

=== Bible in China ===
Starting in the early 19th century, many translations of the Bible into Chinese were made by Protestants, Catholics, and Orthodox Christians. An early translation was made by British missionary and linguist Robert Morrison (1782–1834). More than 300 million copies of the Bible in Chinese have been published and disseminated since 1823 with active participation of the Protestant missionaries from 1807 to 1953.

=== Unregistered churches and cults ===
Outside of the state-sanctioned Three-Self Church (三自教會), whose doctrines are in line with mainline Protestantism and have pro-government stances, what is intended as "Protestantism" (Jīdūjiào xīnjiào) in China. There are various dissident churches outside of the Three-Self Church. They primarily operate in the form of the so-called "family churches" (家庭教會), "underground churches" (地下教會) or "underground heavens" (地下天國), small worship groups in family homes. These have generally been called "house churches" by Western Christian media. In contemporary China, house churches are often of significant size, do not operate in houses, and operate openly. Family church networks are especially present in the provinces of Zhejiang and Henan. They have missionaries in other provinces and even abroad to neighboring states, such as Taiwan.

There also includes a variety of cults based on the Bible teachings, such as Eastern Lightning, Mentuhui, Beili Wang, The Shouters, the Total Scope Church, the Fangcheng Fellowship, the China Gospel Fellowship and the Meeting Hall. Many of these less mainstream groups have been labeled "heterodox teachings" (邪教; xiéjiào) and are suppressed by Chinese legal authorities.

== Names for God ==
Shangdi (literally "Highest Emperor") is the term used more commonly by Protestants to translate "God". The Catholic Church historically favored Tianzhu (literally "Lord of Heaven"), hence the Chinese name for Catholicism: Tianzhujiao.

== See also ==
- Che Kam Kong
- Christianity in China
- Catholic Church in China
- List of Protestant theological seminaries in the People's Republic of China
- Chinese Union Version of the Bible
- Chinese New Hymnal
- China Christian Council
- Protestant missions in China
- Protestantism in Sichuan
- Alimujiang Yimiti

== Sources ==
- This article incorporates text from Life among the Chinese: with characteristic sketches and incidents of missionary operations and prospects in China, by Robert Samuel Maclay, a publication from 1861, now in the public domain in the United States.

=== Further reading ===
- Austin, Alvyn (2007). China's Millions: The China Inland Mission and Late Qing Society. Grand Rapids, MI: Eerdmans. ISBN 978-0-8028-2975-7.
- Austin, Alvyn (1986). Saving China: Canadian missionaries in the Middle Kingdom 1888–1959. Toronto: University of Toronto Press.
- Burgess, Alan (1957). The Small Woman. Dutton. ISBN 1-56849-184-0.
- Dunch, Ryan. Fuzhou Protestants and the Making of a Modern China, 1857–1927 (2001) 293 pp.
- Fairbank, John King, ed. The missionary enterprise in China and America (1974) online free to borrow 14 essays by scholars
- Fay, Peter W. "The Protestant Mission and the Opium War," Pacific Historical Review 1971 40(2): 145–61
- Fulton, Austin (1967). Through Earthquake Wind and Fire. Edinburgh: St Andrews Press.
- Gulick, Edward V. (July–September 1975). Peter Parker and the Opening of China. Vol. 95. Journal of the American Oriental Society.
- Latourette, Kenneth Scott (1929). A History of Christian Missions in China.
- Latourette, Kenneth Scott. Christianity in a Revolutionary Age. Vol. III : The 19th Century Outside Europe; the Americas, the Pacific, Asia and Africa. (1969)
- Latourette, Kenneth Scott. Christianity in a Revolutionary Age, Vol. V: The twentieth century outside Europe: the Americas, the Pacific, Asia, and Africa: the emerging world Christian community (1962)
- Lian, Xi. "Western Protestant Missions and Modern Chinese Nationalist Dreams," East Asian History 2006–2007 (32–33): 199–216
- Lian, Xi. The Conversion of Missionaries: Liberalism in American Protestant Missions in China, 1907–1932 (1997).
- Neils, Patricia, ed. United States Attitudes and Policies toward China The Impact of American Missionaries (1990)
- "Pfister, Lauren F. Striving for "The Whole Duty of Man": James Legge and the Scottish Protestant Encounter with China: Assessing Confluences in Scottish Nonconformism, Chinese Missionary Scholarship, Victorian Sinology, and Chinese Protestantism (2007)
- Rabe, Valentin H. The Home Base of American China Missions, 1880–1920 (1978). 299 pp.
- Semple, Rhonda Anne. Missionary Women: Gender, Professionalism and the Victorian Idea of Christian Mission (2003) covers 1865–1910
- Spence, Jonathan D. (1991). The Search for modern China. W. W. Norton & Co. ISBN 0-393-30780-8.
- Soong, Irma Tam (1997). Sun Yat-sen's Christian Schooling in Hawai'i. Hawai'i: The Hawaiian Journal of History, vol. 13.
- Varg, Paul A. Missionaries, Chinese, and Diplomats: The American Protestant Missionary Movement in China, 1890–1952 (1958)
- Varg, Paul A. "Missionaries and Relations Between the United States and China in the Late Nineteenth Century," World Affairs Quarterly 1956 27(2): 153–71.
