= Heterodox teachings (Chinese law) =

Concept in the law of the People's Republic of China

Heterodox teaching (Chinese: 邪教; pinyin: xiéjiào) is a concept in the law of the People's Republic of China (PRC) and its administration regarding new religious movements and their suppression. Also translated as "cults" or "evil religions", heterodox teachings are defined in Chinese law as organizations and religious movements that either fraudulently use religion to carry out other illegal activities, deify their leaders, spread "superstition" to confuse or deceive the public, or "disturb the social order" by harming people's lives or property.

The current law regarding heterodox teachings was established by the Standing Committee of the National People's Congress (NPCSC) in October 1999, based in part on an earlier law from November 1995. A few months later, in April 2000, the Ministry of Public Security published its own guidance on what constituted a heterodox teaching organization, how they would be addressed, and a list and description of 14 religious organizations identified as organizations for suppression (included below). These movements were directly compared to the historical religious movements the White Lotus and the Red Lanterns, both widely regarded as cults.

One religious movement that has been consistently targeted is Falun Gong. The passage of the heterodox teachings laws is widely viewed as part of the overall campaign for the persecution of Falun Gong in the PRC. (Note: "Cracks in China's Crackdown". The Washington Post. 1999.: "It was Jiang who ordered that Falun Gong be labeled a 'cult,' and then demanded that a law be passed banning cults, a party source said."; "2000 Annual Report on International Religious Freedom: China". U.S. Department of State.: "In October 1999, as part of the Government's anti-Falun Gong crackdown, the Standing Committee of the National People's Congress adopted a decision to ban "cults," including the Falun Gong, under Article 300 of the Criminal Law."; Richardson & Edelman 2003, pp. 312: "[O]n 22 July 1999, the State Council, the executive branch of the central government, officially banned Falun Gong, labeling it an “evil cult.” The Standing Committee of the National People's Congress then passed ex post facto legislation banning “evil cults” on 30 October 1999."; "People's Republic of China" (PDF). Amnesty International.: "All the information available indicates that the crackdown [on Falun Gong] is politically motivated, with legislation being used retroactively to convict people [...]") The persecution has drawn condemnation from governments worldwide, with 921 lawmakers and political figures signing a statement in 2020 calling it a "systematic and brutal campaign to eradicate the spiritual discipline of Falun Gong”.

== Legislation ==
On 30 October 1999, the Standing Committee of the National People's Congress passed the “Decision on Banning Heretical Organizations and Preventing and Punishing Heretical Activities”, which called for a crackdown on “heretical organizations such as Qigong and other forms”, and also applied retroactively to Qigong practitioners.

On the same day, the Supreme People's Court and the Supreme People's Procuratorate issued a joint judicial interpretation named, “Explanation on Questions Concerning the Concrete Application of Laws Handling Criminal Cases of Organizing and Making Use of Heretical Organizations”. The interpretation reads:

The offenses of establishing or using sects to organize, scheme, carry out and instigate activities of splitting China, endangering the reunification of China or subverting the country's socialist system should be handled according to relevant laws on endangering State security offenses, as stipulated in the Criminal Law.

== 2000 Ministry of Public Security list ==
The following 14 organizations and movements were specifically named in the 2000 list of heterodox teachings published by the Ministry of Public Security. This list articulated different organizations that the Ministry had investigated or been involved in the suppression of since at least 1983. The first seven groups on the list were organizations identified by the Central Committee of the Chinese Communist Party and the State Council, while the second group of seven organizations were identified directly by the ministry. A feature of some, but not all, of the Christian organizations on this list is that their leaders claim to be the second coming of Christ or some other kind of unique church authority.

=== Identified by the Central Committee and State Council ===
1. The Shouters – a Christian movement broadly defined as organizations founded or inspired by Witness Lee, suppressed since 1983 and classified as a heterodox teaching since 1995.
2. Mentuhui – a Christian movement founded by Ji Sanbao, classified as a heterodox teaching since 1995.
3. Born Again Movement – a Christian house church organization founded by Peter Xu, classified since 1995.
4. Spirit Church – identified as the "Lingling Sect" (灵灵教; Línglíng jiào), a Christian sect founded by Hua Xuehe, classified since 1995.
5. New Testament Church – founded by Hong Kong actress Mui Yee and based in Hong Kong and Taiwan, classified since 1995.
6. Guanyin Famen – also organized as Yuan Dun Famen (圆顿法门; Yuán dùn fǎmén), a sect of Mahayana Buddhism founded by Ching Hai, currently organized as a cybersect, classified since 1995.
7. Zhushenjiao – founded by a former member of the Shouters and Beili Wang named Liu Jiaguo in 1993, classified as a heterodox teaching since 1998.

=== Identified by the MoPS ===
8. Beili Wang – founded by former Shouter Wu Yangming, defined by the Ministry of Public Security as a cult organization in 1995.
9. Unification Church, known as the "Moonies" in the United States – founded by Korean-American Sun Myung Moon in Busan in 1954 and defined by the ministry as a cult organization in 1997.
10. True Buddha School, identified as the "Lingxian zhenfozong" (灵仙真佛宗) – a Buddhist sect founded by Chinese-American Lu Sheng-yen in Taiwan, defined by the ministry as a cult in 1995.
11. The Family International, identified as "Children of God" (天父的儿女; Tiān fù de érnǚ), founded in the US in 1968 by David Berg, in China since 1980 and asked to leave by the ministry in 1985, defined by the ministry as a cult in 1995.
12. Dami Mission – a Christian sect founded in South Korea by Lee Jang Rim, in China since 1992 and defined by the ministry as a cult in 1995.
13. Elijah Ten Commandments Stone Kingdom, identified as "World Elijah Gospel Mission Church" (世界以利亚福音宣教会; Shìjiè yǐ lì yǎ fúyīn xuānjiào huì), founded by Korean Park Minghu in 1980 and attempted to form an autonomous zone called "Stone Country", defined by the ministry as a cult in 1996.

== Others recognized before 2012 ==
In addition to the fourteen groups listed above, scholar Edward A. Irons noted an additional eight organizations identified as heterodox groups in various governmental lists and edicts issued before Xi Jinping succeeded Hu Jintao as General Secretary of the Chinese Communist Party in 2012, for a total of 22 groups. Those additional groups are:

1. Eastern Lightning – a Christian sect founded by Zhao Weishan in 1989, identified as a heterodox teaching organization in 1995.
2. Mainland China Administrative Deacon Station (中华大陆行政执事站; Zhōnghuá dàlù xíngzhèng zhíshì zhàn), a Christian sect founded in 1994 by Wang Yongmin, identified as heterodox in 1995.
3. Holy Spirit of Blood and Water Church – a Christian sect founded in Taiwan in 1988 by Zuo Kun, identified as heterodox in 1996.
4. Falun Gong – a New Religious Movement founded in 1992 by Li Hongzhi, identified as heterodox in 1999.
5. Yuandun Famen – a branch of the Guanyin Famen listed above but occasionally recognized as a separate organization, identified as heterodox in 1999.
6. Zhong Gong – a qigong group established in 1987 by Zhang Hongbao, identified as heterodox in 2000.
7. South China Church – a Christian sect founded in 1990 by Gong Shengliang and descended from the All Ranges Church identified above, identified as heterodox in 2001.
8. Pure Land Learning Association (净宗学会; Jìng zōng xuéhuì) – a Buddhist sect founded in Taiwan in 1984 by Chin Kung, identified as heterodox in 2011.

== 2017 designation of "dangerous organizations" ==
On September 18, 2017, a new government heterodox website listed a total of 20 groups (all of the 22 groups listed above, but with the notable exceptions of Zhong Gong and the Pure Land Learning Association, whose omission is the cause of some speculation), eleven of whom were identified as "dangerous", as opposed to the nine groups receiving the lesser warning to "be on guard" against them. These eleven groups were:

1. Falun Gong (New religion movement)
2. The Church of Almighty God (New religion movement)
3. The Shouters (Offshoot Christian sect)
4. Mentuhui (Christian movement)
5. Unification Church (New religion movement)
6. Guanyin Famen (School of Mahayana Buddhism)
7. Bloody Holy Spirit (Christian cult)
8. All Ranges Church (Christian movement)
9. Sanban Puren Pai (Christian doomsday sect)
10. True Buddha School (Buddhist organization)
11. Mainland China Administrative Deacon Station

== See also ==
- Freedom of religion in China
- Antireligious campaigns in China
- Governmental lists of cults
- New religious movement

== Notes and references ==
Notes

Chinese government documents related to heterodox teachings
Legislation	Decision of the Standing Committee of the National People's Congress on Banning Cult Organizations, Preventing and Punishing Cult Activities	1999
Ministry of Public Security	Notice of the Ministry of Public Security on Several Issues Concerning the Identification and Banning of Cult Organizations	2000
Judicial Committee of the Supreme People's Court	Interpretation of the Supreme People's Court and the Supreme People's Procuratorate on Several Issues Concerning the Application of Law in Handling Criminal Cases of Establishing and Using Cults to Disrupt the Implementation of Law	2017
