= Zhushenjiao =

New religious movement in China

Zhushenjiao (主神教 Supreme Spirit), also referred to as "Lord God's Teachings" is a new religious movement in China. Areas with its activity include Anhui, Guangxi, Hunan, Jiangxi, Shandong, Tianjin, Yunnan and Zhejiang.

== History ==
The movement was founded in Anhui in late 1992 or early 1993. Its founder was Liu Jiaguo (刘家国), who was born in 1964 in Huoqiu County in Anhui Province and executed in 1999.

Liu was a member of the Shouters who later joined the Beili Wang movement. The latter group sent him to Hunan as a missionary in 1991. After the repression of Beili Wang by the government, Liu decided to establish his own group, attracting mostly former members of Beili Wang. By 1997, Liu had some 10,000 followers and was able to organize a national congress in Hunan with devotees from some 15 provinces.

Liu was accused of fraud, of asking extravagant gifts from his followers, and of keeping a harem of women with whom he regularly had sex. He was arrested in June 1998 and indicted for multiple charges of rape. He defended himself by claiming sex had always been consensual, but was found guilty by a Hunan court, sentenced to death, and executed in October 1999.

Several other members were arrested and charged with fraud and operating a cult, including Liu's second-in-command, a peasant from Xiangxiang, Hunan, called Zhu Aiqing (朱爱清), who was sentenced to seventeen years in jail. As a result of the arrests, the group declined but was reported as still active in 2015.

== Beliefs ==
All information about Zhushenjiao's beliefs come from hostile sources, either Christian opponents or Chinese authorities. The movement was accused of trying to create a divine empire and to have divinized Liu and other leaders.

China Gospel Fellowship, which regards Zhushenjiao as a cult, claims that the group had a system including "God the Lord" (主神), "Lord on High" (在上主), elders (长老), "four living creatures" (四活物 ), "seven angels’ (七天使), provincial authorities (省权柄), county authorities (县权柄), and co-workers (同工). Liu was recognized as "God the Lord" and Zhu Aiqing as "Lord on High."

== See also ==
- Heterodox teachings (Chinese law)
