= China Anti-Cult Association =

Chinese government-backed organization

- 中國反邪教協會
- Abbreviation: CACA
- Founded: 2000; 26 years ago
- Founder: He Zuoxiu
- Type: State-linked advocacy group
- Location: Beijing, China
- Website: chinafxj.cn

The China Anti-Cult Association (CACA) (Chinese: 中國反邪教協會), also known as the China Anti-Xie Jiao Association, is a Chinese state-linked advocacy group formed to oppose the activities of Falun Gong and certain other new religious movements.

== History and activities ==
CACA was founded in 2000 with the stated aim to mobilize "social forces" against groups like Falun Gong viewed as threating national stability. Its founder was China Academy of Sciences-affiliated physicist He Zuoxiu. CACA describes itself as a non-profit civil society organization, though it has organizational ties to the Chinese government and its activities align with government aims. It is headquartered in Beijing.

In 2014, CACA released a list of 20 "cult organizations" active in China. It runs the news portal Kaiwind (facts.org.cn).

== Reception ==
CACA has been criticized by some observers as a government tool for religious persecution. Academic Wendy Rogers stated in 2017 that it had been established by the Chinese Communist Party "to create propaganda vilifying Falun Gong", and that it "devises methods of forcible ideological conversion of Falun Gong practitioners". A 2024 United States Commission on International Religious Freedom report named CACA as an entity through which the Chinese government carries out campaigns to eliminate religious groups such as Falun Gong and The Church of Almighty God.
