= Sanban Puren Pai =

Christian doomsday sect in China

Sanban puren pai (三班仆人派 Three Grades of Servant Church) is a Christian doomsday sect in China. The group was founded in Henan by Xu Wenku (徐文库 also known as Xu Shuangfu 徐双富, 1946–2006) who claimed to be the "Great Servant" 大仆人 in the 1990s.

Chinese official sources credited the movement in 2000 with at least half a million members. The name “Three Grades or Servants” came from Xu's teaching that God operates in history through triumvirates: rulers of fifties, of hundreds and of thousands in the Old Testament, teachers, prophets and apostles in the New Testament, and evangelists, handmaids, and servants today.

In 2006, the China Anti-Cult Association (中国反邪教协会) denounced the Three Grades of Servants through a movie called 警惕冒用宗教名义的非法组织 ("Beware Of Illegal Organizations Using The Name Of Religion").

== See also ==
- Heterodox teachings (Chinese law)
