= Ecumenical China Study Liaison Group =

The Ecumenical China Study Liaison Group (ECSLG) is a group of mostly European China watchers who met intermittently in the 1970s and 1980s. Key members represented the Roman Catholic Church and mainline Protestant denominations, including state churches. Members gathered every one to two years to share research and consider developments in Christianity in China starting from the latter part of the Cultural Revolution through the death of Mao Zedong, the opening up of China under the Four Modernizations Policy of Deng Xiaoping, the reestablishment of the Three-Self Patriotic Movement, and the persecution of the so-called "Shouters sect" in 1983.

== Key Member Organizations ==
Membership in the ECSLG was fluid, but the following organizations played key roles:

- The Lutheran World Federation (LWF) Department of Studies
- Pro Mundi Vita (PMV), a Roman Catholic research center
- Tao Fong Shan Ecumenical Centre (TFSEC), based in Hong Kong
- The Anglican-operated China Study Project (CSP)
- The Hong Kong Christian Council (HKCC)

== Background ==
The origins of the ECSLG lie in the struggle to make sense of the expulsion of missionaries from China during the Denunciation Movement and what appeared to be the suppression of Christianity in China. Members of the ECSLG were greatly influenced by a book written by a former missionary to China who argued that God was judging the Christian church through anti-Christian, particular communist, movements. Some ECSLG members were admirers of Mao, and a number embraced "liberation theology."

In 1972 Johannes Aagaard, a Danish missiologist and countercultist, chaired a gathering titled "The Nordic Consultation on China" at the Ecumenical Study Centre in Aarhus, Denmark, to discuss "The Missiological Implications of the Rise of China." The Lutheran World Federation (LWF) Department of Studies and its chair, Dr. Arne Søvik, a former missionary to China who had launched a "Marxism and China Study Programme" a year earlier, collaborated. Aagaard, who described himself as "active in leftist politics" endorsed a Norwegian missionary's statement that "China is more important for God than the church in China."

The LWF and Pro Munda Vita (PMV) agreed to merge their efforts and brought together a group in Bastad, Sweden, from January 29 through February 2, 1974, in preparation for a larger gathering in Louvain, Belgium later in the year. The Louvain Colloquium, which was held on September 9 through 14, took as its theme "Christian Faith and the Chinese Experience." Participants spoke glowingly of "the new China" and in his summation of the gathering LWF's Jonas Jonson spoke of "the Chinese revolution as one stage in the fulfillment of God's salvific plan for the world," "the theology of liberation," and a "new understanding of the revolutionary process and a commitment to it based on Christian faith." The workshop reports of the Louvain Colloquium were published in English, Chinese, Danish, Dutch, French, German, Italian, and Spanish and were widely disseminated. Evangelicals criticized the reports coming out of Bastad and Louvain, including Jonathan Chao, the prospective dean of the China Graduate School of Theology in Hong Kong and a Louvain participant; Andrew Chiu, dean of the Lutheran Bible Institute in Hong Kong; and Gustav Weth, a former China missionary and author of a book on Christianity in China and the impact of the Communist Revolution. A later assessment by Richard Madsen, also a Louvain participant, argued that the colloquium's reports reflected tension caused by the growth of evangelical Christianity in the West and corresponding decline in mainline denominations. Madsen concluded, "The Louvain colloquium's positive view of China was thus driven more by the institutional demands of Western liberal Christianity—especially by its theological rivalry with evangelical Christianity—than by any particular contact with Chinese realities."

== History ==
In February 1976 PMV and the LWF convened a smaller group of people in Arnoldshain, Germany. At that meeting the group adopted the name Ecumenical China Study Liaison Group and agreed that PMV and LWF would continue as the group's co-sponsors. Arne Søvik was chosen as the group's principal contact. In the LWF's report, Søvik asked whether a consultation was needed to counteract Love China '75, a gathering of over four hundred people in Manila, the Philippines, whose attendees, observing the waning of the Cultural Revolution, discussed ways to spread the Christian gospel in China, a sentiment ECSLG members shared with the TSPM.

ECLSG members gathered in London from September 6 through 8, 1977. Ray Whitehead of the China Working Group of the Canadian Council of Churches told attendees that according to K. H. Ting, the decline of the Chinese church was "due to historical factors now irreversible, and not government suppression." Meeting records show a growing discord between the European China watchers associated with mainline denominations and more evangelical participants.

The third meeting of the ECSLG was held in St. Trudo's Abbey, outside Bruges, Belgium, from September 3 through 6, 1979. The first day of the conference was occupied by a controversy that had broken out during the Third World Conference on Religion and Peace at Princeton University. K. H. Ting, who attended that conference as the deputy head of China's delegation, had strongly objected to the National Council of Churches (NCC) inviting the Dalai Lama to participate in a "Church World Service" on September 7. The ECSLG asked the NCC to do everything possible to prevent a planned visit by ECSLG members to China from being cancelled.

Two months later K. H. Ting publicly criticized an article by Joseph Spae, a Roman Catholic priest and ECSLG member. In it, Spae differentiated between the "Patriotic Church" and the "Martyred Church." Ting termed Spae's article "a not-so dexterous political manoeuvre to mobilize hate-China feeling internationally." The ECSLG discussed Spae's article and Ting's response in a fourth gathering on September 22–24, 1980, at the Maryknoll Retreat Center in Hong Kong.

The Ting-Spae controversy marked the beginning of the end of the ECSLG. In Hong Kong members had decided to reconvene in Canada in the fall of 1981 or spring of 1982. Instead, the Canada China Programme called a separate and significantly larger gathering but blacklisted ECSLG members who were not TSPM supporters. The ECSLG met one final time in Glion, Switzerland, in May 1983. During that meeting members expressed doubts about its future role, and it never met again.

== Relationships with Other Entities ==
The publications of core ECSLG members shows that they recognized the Three-Self Patriotic Movement as the sole representative of Protestantism in China:

- Ching Feng, published by the Tao Fong Shan Ecumenical Centre (TFSEC), contained many articles translated into Traditional Chinese from Tian Feng, the official TSPM publication.
- Religion: Documentation in the People's Republic of China was "published by the China Study Project, U.K.; the Lutheran World Federation, Geneva; Pro Mundi Vita, Brussels; and Missio Aachen in co-operation with the Christian Study Centre, Tao Fong Shan, Hong Kong; and other members of the Ecumenical China Liaison Group." It provided English translations of statements from the five officially recognized religious organizations in China. In most issues documents of the TSPM occupied the largest section.
- Members of the Hong Kong Christian Council were instrumental in propagating the TSPM's version of events at Dongyang and Yiwu blaming "the Shouters sect." That version of events was picked up and repeated by other ECSLG members, making it the dominant narrative.
- Bridge: Church Life in China Today, also published by the TFSEC, was established to report on developments with TSPM congregations. When Deng Zhaoming, Bridge's editor for fifteen years, began to write about TSPM's complicity in persecution of unregistered churches, he was severely criticized and was asked to retire, and Bridge was discontinued.

Through Aagaard and Søvik, the ECSLG also had links to the American countercult, particularly the Spiritual Counterfeits Project. Aagaard attended an SCP-sponsored Cults Conference in Berkeley, California from November 2 through 4, 1979. Aagaard hired former SCP staffers Mark Albrecht and then Neil Duddy (who worked on a stipend funded through Søvik by the LWF Department of Studies) to be the editors of Update: A Quarterly Journal on New Religious Movements, which was an LWF publication in which both Aagaard and Søvik were involved. Update frequently featured articles by American countercultists. Update was superseded by Areopagus, which LWF jointly published with the TFSEC.

== Continued Influence ==
Although the ECSLG was short-lived, members have continued to shape Western perceptions of Christianity in China through their writings, especially:

- Philip Wickeri, ordained by K. H. Ting in 1981, researcher at Tao Fong Shan, and first coordinator of the Amity Foundation – Seeking the Common Ground: Protestant Christianity, the Three-self movement, and China's united front, Maryknoll, NY: Orbis Books, 1988 (ISBN 9780883444412, OCLC 492483709); and Reconstructing Christianity in China: K. H. Ting and the Church in China, Maryknoll, NY: Orbis Books, 2007 (ISBN 9781570757518, OCLC 604866844);
- Bob Whyte, an Anglican and Ecumenist Director of the China Study Project of the British Council of Churches – Unfinished Encounter: China and Christianity, London: Fount Paperbacks, 1988 (ISBN 9780819215277, OCLC 213025660); and
- Edmond Tang – Researcher for Pro Mundi Vita, later Director of the China Desk of the Council of Churches of Britain and Ireland – Asian and Pentecostal: The Charismatic Face of Christianity in Asia, Allan Anderson and Edmond Tang, eds., Eugene, OR: Wipf and Stock Publishers, 2011 (ISBN 9781610979177, OCLC 990520214).
