= Pseudoreligion =

Non-mainstream philosophical movement which functions like a religion

Pseudoreligion or pseudotheology is a pejorative term which is a combination of the Greek prefix "pseudo", meaning false, and "religion." The term is sometimes avoided in religious scholarship as it is seen as polemic, but it is used colloquially in multiple ways, and is generally used for a belief system, philosophy, or movement which is functionally similar to a religious movement, often having a founder, principal text, liturgy, or faith-based beliefs. It is also used for movements or ideologies which are not ostensibly religious but have qualities identified as "religious" qualities such as extreme devotion among adherents. The term quasi-religion has also been used, sometimes synonymously and sometimes distinctly from the term pseudoreligion.

== Difference with religion ==
There is no legal definition for "religion", which makes it difficult to legally define a "pseudoreligion". This has led to inconsistencies in laws around the world, and has sometimes led to courts making rulings over "acceptable" and "unacceptable" religions. In the United States, all beliefs are protected equally, but illegal conduct cannot be excused by religious beliefs, and the law must be upheld even in morally complex situations. In other countries, such as China, different groups are treated differently, and labels such as religion or pseudoreligion can be lead to persecution.

The term pseudoreligion derives from the Greek word pseúdos, meaning "lie" or "falsehood", and religion. Religious scholar Hartmut Zinser notes that the phrase is often applied both to movements which claim a religious quality, such as new religious movements, and those which are not related to religion, such as political movements, which nonetheless have been identified as having a religious quality or "fascination" to them. According to Zinser however, terms such as pseudoreligion "should be avoided by religious studies, since ... it is generally impossible to decide what is a religion and what is not", and therefore they "belong to the realm of religious polemic and have no scientific merit."

Nevertheless, some scholars have used the term, such as historian Kees W. Bolle who argues that it is important to differentiate between a religion and a pseudo-religion. According to Richard E. Creel, "Authentic religion... should be thought of as holistic, wholehearted, and transcendent. It involves the whole person in relation to the whole of life— indeed, in relation to the whole of existence," and if it does not include these things then it should be considered pseudoreligion. According to Fenggang Yang, belief in the supernatural is not necessarily a feature of pseudoreligion, whereas it is for a "full religion." Bruce Francis Biever defines a pseudoreligion as "a set of beliefs and practices which take on many of the aspects of religion, but which do not necessarily have all, or even the majority, of the characteristics". Another definition of pseudoreligion which has been used is the "appropriation of religious symbolism and discourse for predominantly political purposes, and to justify permanent war and violence" such as the September 11 attacks or the subsequent war on terror. Author Garry Wills on the other hand, while acknowledging a tendency within certain groups to see a charismatic ruler as "superhuman", believes that "we should not quibble on theological matters like 'true religion' and 'pseudoreligion.'"

Sociologist Phil Zuckerman has proposed a "substitution hypothesis," in which those who leave religion can become involved with alternative belief systems or communities including spiritual groups, political ideologies, or conspiracy theories as a replacement or substitute for their previous religion. Atheist scholar Peter Boghossian argues that these alternatives to religion qualify as "pseudo-religions" or "pseudo-ideologies" and only through proper education in "philosophy, logic, and critical reasoning" can people leaving religion avoid this effect.

=== Quasi-religions ===
In 1963, German-American philosopher Paul Tillich introduced a distinction between pseudo-religions and quasi-religions. He described pseudo-religions as movements which intentionally deceive adherents through their similarities with mainstream religions, while quasi-religions are non-religious movements which have unintended similarities to religions, such as political movements.

== Examples of pseudoreligions ==
According to Kees W. Bolle, the World War II Axis powers of Nazi Germany, fascist Italy, and imperialistic Japan "yield powerful examples" of pseudo-religious mythologies being used to justify actions. Nazism especially has often been characterized as pseudoreligious, with its focus on ritual which has been described as "Catholicism without Christianity." Quasi-religious ceremonies included "holy days" celebrating events like the Nazi party's rise to power or Adolf Hitler's birthday, and festivals mimicking Christian festivals. Nazi movements like Positive Christianity and Völkisch, as well as Nazi leaders like Joseph Goebbels and Rudolf Hess, actively sought to replace God with Hitler and replace Christianity with a Nazi pseudoreligion; and their efforts coincided with rapid declines in traditional Christian churches.

Marxism and Maoism are other political ideologies which have been described as a pseudoreligious; as have been Trumpism and QAnon. Various new religious movements have been called pseudoreligions, such the Nation of Islam and Scientology. New Age movements have also sometimes been studied as pseudoreligions, as has fetishism. Atheism and secular humanism have been viewed as pseudoreligions. The term has even been used to attack schools of thought which claim to be scientific, such as Comtean positivism, as lacking actual scientific rigor. In the sports world, Olympism has been called a pseudoreligion, quasi-religion, or civil religion.

== See also ==
- Civil religion – Manifestation of religious values inherent to nations
- Fictional religion – Fictional belief system
- Parody religion – Constructed mock religion
- Secular religion – Communal belief system without the supernatural
