= Mentuhui =

Christian movement in China

Three-Redemptive Christ
- 三赎基督
- Type: Chinese Local Church movement
- Classification: Christian new religious movement
- Region: People's Republic of China
- Language: Standard Chinese
- Founder: Ji Sanbao
- Origin: 20 February 1989; China
- Branched from: The Shouters
- Other name: Mentuhui

The Mentuhui (Chinese: 门徒会; lit. 'apostles' assembly'), also known as the Three-Redemptive Christ sect (Chinese: 三赎基督; pinyin: sān shú jīdū), is a Christian doomsday and new religious movement in China.

The group was founded in Shaanxi in 1989 by former Shouter Ji Sanbao (Chinese: 季三保), who claimed to be the Second Coming of Jesus Christ. He ordained 12 "disciples", leading to the group being known as the apostles' assembly.

By 1995, the group claimed to have over 250,000 followers. By 1999, it may have had more than half a million members. In 2013, the sect had approximately 100,000 members in Guizhou. and had a presence in Shaanxi, Gansu, Hebei, Qinghai, Hunan, Jiangsu, Yunnan, Shandong, Sichuan and Xinjiang.

The Mentuhui was banned in China in 1990 and included on the government list of xiéjiào in 1995. There have been numerous arrests of members since then. The most recent crackdown was in summer 2020, when police arrested almost 100 members in Baotou and another 100 members in Dezhou.

== History ==
The movement was founded by Ji Sanbao in Yao County, Tongchuan, Shaanxi, on 20 February 1989 (the 15th day of the first lunar month).

Ji Sanbao, also known as Ji Zhongjie, was born in 1939 to a peasant family in Shaanxi. Having only attained a primary school education, he spent most of his early life working as a farmer and miner, eventually moving to Xinjiang to work for the Xinjiang Production and Construction Corps. Ji met and married his wife there in 1960, and they would go on to have several children together, eventually returning to Shaanxi in 1971.

Ji converted to Christianity in 1976 after the death of one of his sons, joining the Shouters sect in 1982. In 1985 he proclaimed himself the "Three-Redemptive Christ" (referring to the redemption of Noah, the redemption of Lot, and the redemption of Ji Sanbao), declared the end of the world was imminent, and proposed a "seven-step spiritual journey" to save humanity and bring all mankind to the Kingdom of Christ.

Ji began preaching his beliefs across China in the late 1980s, recruiting followers in Ankang, Xiangyang and Xichuan County, Nanyang. After ordaining 12 "disciples", Ji established both the Mentuhui movement and declared himself the Son of Heaven (True Dragon Emperor) of the Heavenly Kingdom of Christ. The government of the Heavenly Kingdom, based out of Hanzhong, was established to overthrow and replace the government of the People's Republic of China. Xu Mingchao, one of Ji's 12 disciples, served as prime minister.

The Mentuhui was banned in 1990. In March 1992, Ji Sanbao was arrested and sentenced to 7 years imprisonment. He was released early in June 1997, but died soon after in a car accident in Xi'an in December. Following Ji's death, Wei Shiqiang, one of the 12 disciples, was proclaimed King of the Heavenly Kingdom of Christ. In June 2001, less than 4 years after taking over the group's leadership, Wei died of liver cancer. Chen Shirong, another disciple, succeeded Wei as King.

Chen, alongside other Mentuhui leaders, was arrested on 6 November 2005 in Hanzhong. He was sentenced to 13 years imprisonment on charges of leading and organizing an illegal organization. The Heavenly Kingdom was effectively dissolved following Chen's arrest.

== See also ==
- Beili Wang
- Christianity in China
- God complex
