= Hanau sect =

Pseudo-religious group in Hanau, Germany

- Formation: c. 1980s
- Founder: Sylvia Dorn; Walter Dorn
- Type: Pseudo-religious group
- Headquarters: Hanau, Hesse, Germany
- Members: c. 15
- Leader: Sylvia Dorn

The Hanau sect is a pseudo-religious group led by Sylvia Dorn in Hanau, Hesse, Germany.

Sylvia Dorn and her husband Walter Dorn, a priest, created the cult group in the 1980s. The group has around 15 members, dominantly led by Sylvia Dorn. She claims to get messages directly from God (as a medium), which must be executed by the members. The creation of the group dates back at the early 1980s, when three pastors of the United Methodist Church were excluded from their denomination because they resorted to the method of dream interpretation. One of them was Walter Dorn, a second is still active in the sect today.

Walter Dorn established a television and media production company called Aeon-Verlag. The company is presumably considered as a "work of God". At some point it should serve to spread the message of Sylvia D. and of God, called, the "old one". The employees are part of the group. The city of Hanau canceled all cooperation with the company until the trial has ended.

In September 2017 Sylvia Dorn was impeached for killing Jan H., the four-year-old son of a cult member at 17 August 1988. Joint investigation carried out by the Frankfurter Rundschau and the Hessenschau had led to the reopening of the case in 2015. Dorn packed Jan in a big bag and didn't react to his screams and panic reactions. D. called the young boy a "pig" and a "reincarnation of Hitler". She was convicted of murder and sentenced to life-long imprisonment in September 2020.

== Publications ==
Sylvia Dorn, Walter Dorn: Halt fest, daß Gott mit Allem und Jedem zu tun hat. 1982 ISBN 978-1262404294
