= Shouters =

Shouters may refer to:

- Nevi'im, the second main division of the Hebrew Bible
- The Shouters, an offshoot Chinese Christian group labelled as a Christian sect by the PRC
- The Spiritual Baptists, a Caribbean syncretic religion
