= South China Church =

South China Church is an Evangelical denomination of China. In 1990 or 1991, it formed as an offshoot of Peter Xu's "All Ranges Church" which is also known as the Born Again Movement. Its former head Gong Shengliang was sentenced to a death penalty, but this sentence has since been commuted to life imprisonment. The South China Church is a banned church deemed a cult by authorities. The main criticism outside of that is that they are fundamentalist and charismatic. The official hostility to the church has garnered it support among several groups concerned with religious persecution. It is an "underground church" so membership figures are uncertain, but most estimates state it has tens of thousands of members.

== Imprisoned Members ==
Xu Fuming: was sentenced to life in prison in 2002.

Sun Minghua: born on June 13, 1965, in Hubei province. Influenced by her Christian mother, she became a disciple of Christ in 1984; and in 1986, she devoted herself to preaching the gospel.

Sun was arrested in September 2001, on suspicion of organizing and utilizing a cult organization to undermine law enforcement. At the time she was a council member in charge of finances for the SCC. The trial for the charges related to organizing a cult was held December 2001, when Sun was sentenced to life in prison. At a later High Court hearing, this sentence was reduced to 12 years.

== See also ==
- Heterodox teachings (Chinese law)
