= Cybersectarianism =

Phenomenon in religion

Cybersectarianism is the phenomenon of new religious movements and other groups using the Internet for text distribution, recruitment, and information sharing.

== As an organizational type ==
The term, as coined by political scientist Patricia M. Thornton at the University of Oxford, describes "a unique hybrid form of politico-religious mobilization" adopted by a handful of syncretic qigong (气功) groups that emerged in the People's Republic of China (PRC) during the late 1980s and early 1990s, and were subjected to extreme repression following the crackdown against banned religious and spiritual organizations in 1999.

Cybersectarianism as an organizational form involves: "highly dispersed small groups of practitioners that may remain largely anonymous within the larger social context and operate in relative secrecy, while still linked remotely to a larger network of believers who share a set of practices and texts, and often a common devotion to a particular leader. Overseas supporters provide funding and support; domestic practitioners distribute tracts, participate in acts of resistance, and share information on the internal situation with outsiders. Collectively, members and practitioners of such sects construct viable virtual communities of faith, exchanging personal testimonies and engaging in collective study via email, on-line chat rooms and web-based message boards."

== In China ==
Transnational Chinese cybersects include the group commonly known in the West as Falun Gong (法轮功), Zhong Gong (中华养生益智功), and the Taiwan-based group founded by Suma Ching Hai, commonly referred to in the PRC as Guanyin Famen (观音法门), but rendered in English by the Ching Hai World Society as Quan Yin. Some new transnational Protestant groups also subjected to persecution in the PRC, like Eastern Lightning, have likewise taken to the internet to ensure group survival, and taken on some of the characteristics of cybersects elsewhere. Like the New Cyberreligious Movements (NCRMs) described by Karaflogka, cybersect participants rely upon computer mediated communication (CMC) in their personal religious or spiritual practice, performing cyberpilgrimages, participating in cybermeditation sessions online, and/or cyberevangelism in third-party chatrooms.

Some cybersect members of groups, including Aum Shinrikyo and al Qaeda, engage in "repertoires of electronic contention," using websites and e-mail to mobilize participants for protest and contention, as well as hactivism (acts of electronic disruption) and even cyberterrorism (acts of physical harm caused by the disruption of power grids, traffic control, and other systems of resource delivery and public safety).

== Among Muslims ==
More recently, Sunni- and Shia-affiliated hackers have attacked and counter-attacked hundreds of websites in a vast struggle over cyberspace that has been characterized as an outbreak of cybersectarianism. Alaeldin Maghaireh describes two principal types of cyber-sectarian conflict in Muslim cyberspace: "Cyber-Islamist Advocacy," which consists of "religious publications, debates, emails awareness, lectures and videos;" and "Islamist Hactivism," which involves "cyber attacks against other religious or non-religious websites." Similarly, Dru C. Gladney describes how Muslim netizens in the Chinese province of Xinjiang have turned to the internet to explore and express their desires for independence with the broader, transnational Uyghur communities, culminating in what Gladney describes as a groundswell of "cyber-separatism."

== Other groups ==
When taken to the airwaves and posted on the internet, divisive sectarian language among Catholic and Protestant residents of post-agreement Northern Ireland has also been described as an outbreak of cybersectarianism by Ballymena-born BBC reporter, Declan Lawn, and others. In a similar vein, the term is also commonly used to describe the internecine internet-based partisan splintering among various factions of the Socialist Party of America,. There is some evidence to suggest that the heavy reliance of such groups on the internet, a medium that not only facilitates but also encourages user interactivity and peer-to-peer information sharing, may present serious challenges to the maintenance of internal coherence and policing of orthodoxy by a central core of leaders.

Cultural theorist Paul Virilio likewise described the San Diego–based UFO religious group Heaven's Gate as a cybersect, due to the group's heavy reliance on CMC as a mode of communication prior to the group's 1997 collective suicide; while Rita M. Hauck of Fort Hays University considers "cybersect" to be a new but widely used term that "implies cyborgs or cybernauts with a collaborative agenda.
