= Che Kam Kong =

Chinese Christian martyr

Che Kam Kong (died in 1871), also known as Chea Kunkong, was a Chinese Protestant Christian who was killed because of his beliefs in China. He is regarded by some to be one of the first martyrs among Protestants in China. Che Kam Kong visited British Hong Kong in 1865, and in 1866 converted to Christianity. He proselytized extensively over the next five years, allegedly bringing about the conversion of over a hundred people in Poklo, Guangdong province. Town elders in Poklo, concerned with this abandonment of traditional religious beliefs, warned Che to stop, yet he refused. He was kidnapped and tortured in 1871 in an attempt to force him to give up his beliefs. He is said to have declared, "You may kill my body but you cannot destroy my soul". He was taken outside the city gates and killed; his body was cut up and thrown into a nearby river.

== See also ==
- Christianity in China
- Protestantism in China
- 19th-century Protestant missions in China
