= Zhang Hongbao =

Founder of Zhong Gong

Zhang Hongbao 張宏堡
- Born: 5 January 1954; Harbin, China
- Died: 31 July 2006; Arizona, USA
- Occupations: Businessman, spiritual leader
- Known for: Founder of Zhong Gong

Zhang Hongbao (simplified Chinese: 张宏堡; traditional Chinese: 張宏堡) (5 January 1954, in Harbin, Heilongjiang, China – 31 July 2006, in Arizona, USA) was the founder and spiritual leader of Zhong Gong, a Qigong-based new religious movement. He was also a wealthy businessman and a self-proclaimed leader of the Chinese democracy movement.

In 1999, Zhong Gong was officially classified as a cult and banned by the Chinese government, leading Zhang to seek political asylum in the United States. Following his relocation to America, several former Zhong Gong members would accuse Zhang of raping them under the pretext of "spiritual healing".

Zhang died in a motor vehicle accident in Arizona in July 2006. No notable Zhong Gong activity has been reported since his death.

== Early life ==
Zhang was born in 1954 in Harbin, where his family trade was coal-mining. Zhang spent ten years during the Cultural Revolution in a state farm in Heilongjiang, during which time he started practicing Qigong. In 1977, he was admitted to the Harbin School of Metallurgy. On leaving, he joined the Communist Party and became a physics teacher in a mining region. Zhang gained entrance into the Beijing University of Science and Technology in 1985 where he studied Economic management. Palmer, citing Ji Yi, said Zhang obtained only mediocre grades as a student, but he was interested in a diverse range of modules from Law to Chinese and Western Medicine. He also signed on at the Chinese Qigong Further Education Academy. During this time he developed a style of Qigong which was based on automation, physics, relativity, bionics, and with distinctive use of mechanical engineering jargon. After graduation, he became a paid qigong researcher at a university during the Qigong boom in China.

== Zhong Gong ==
Zhang founded Zhong Gong in 1987, launching it on the auspicious date of 8 August. Palmer, citing Ji Yi's 10-million-selling hagiography The Great Qigong Master Comes Down From the Mountains (1990), says that Zhang gave two-week-long Qigong workshops which received national coverage in the People's Daily. Among the over a thousand people who participated were prominent academics such as the President of Beijing University, who were reportedly able to capture and emit Qi. Having won over the academic community, Zhang also gained acceptance within the Chinese Academy of Sciences, and other sections of the scientific community. Furthermore, he became a media celebrity after one workshop was featured in a three-minute news segment on CCTV. He also gained credibility within the media and political elites.

The movement claimed 34 million followers, 120,000 employees, 30 life cultivation bases, and 100,000 "branches" at its peak.

According to Perry, in the early 1990s, Zhang and his followers withdrew to Qingchengshan, deep in Sichuan, where Zhang would reorganise his activities into commercial enterprises, the flagship of which was the Qilin Group, based in Qilin City. Cunningham states the group was made up of some 60 companies headquartered in Tianjin. The group reportedly employed 100,000 workers, mostly in qigong-related education, publication and health-product ventures.

== Criminal allegations and exile ==
Unlike Li Hongzhi, founder of Falun Gong, who disavowed political ambition, Zhang Hongbao positively embraced it.

In 2000, a close disciple defected from the group and wrote a scathing exposé alleging that Zhang was a fraud and had illicit sex with followers. Independent Chinese skeptic Sima Nan alleged that Zhang was a rapist and may even have been responsible for the murders of some former followers. The Chinese Government issued a warrant for his arrest on 7 June 2000, and a statement calling for his return to face four counts of rape between 1990 and 1991, and two counts of using forged travel documents between 1993 and 1994. The Chinese authorities allege Zhang was in possession of a bogus identity card in the name of Wang Xingxiang, a Han male born on 8 August 1953.

Zhang reportedly left China from Guangzhou Baiyun International Airport on 17 June 1994, traveling across Southeast Asia before moving to America in 2000.

== Life in the United States ==
Zhang disappeared from public view in 1995 in light of increased criticism of Zhong Gong. Zhang together with his associate and companion, Yan Qingxin, arrived in the American protectorate of Guam in February 2000 without a visa, and applied for political asylum in the United States. While awaiting transfer to the US, Zhang went on hunger strike to press for his release from detention in Guam; several overseas Chinese dissident organizations—including the Free China Movement, the Chinese Democracy Party and the Joint Conference of Chinese Overseas Democracy Movement—organizing a press conference to support his cause. Zhang was denied asylum by the United States, but was granted wrongful withholding, which prevented repatriation to China. After 13 months in detention in Guam, he secured the services of Robert Shapiro, who defended O.J. Simpson. Shapiro claims credit for gaining the support of Trent Lott and Jesse Helms for Zhang's application. Zhang was granted protection residence by the U.S. Board of Immigration Appeal in June 2001, reversing a previous ruling.

In April, the China Federation Foundation (CFF) was founded with money from Zhang, and led by a dissident named Peng Ming. This group wanted to form an alternative government for China through the violent overthrow of the Communist government.

In what may have been a power struggle within the Chinese dissident movement, Zhang subsequently fell out with other dissidents, including Yan Qingxin, his domestic partner for 12 years. Until September 2001, Yan was Zhong Gong's first lieutenant and "helped build the organization into a powerful entity that made billions of dollars". Yan filed a lawsuit on 26 June in Pasadena Superior Court accusing Zhang of assault, battery and false imprisonment, and asked for damages of US$23 million. Yan's sister, Qi Zhang, also a Chinese dissident, filed a suit in Pasadena in July 2003, accusing Zhang of crimes including racketeering and slander. In total, from 2003 to 2005, Zhang was hit by an avalanche of 20–40 civil lawsuits with accusations from other plaintiffs. The arrest of Zhang led to division in the dissident movement.

Zhang was arrested in March 2003 at his Pasadena mansion in connection with allegations made by his housekeeper, He Nanfang. Zhang was charged with four felonies, including kidnapping assault and false imprisonment with a deadly weapon. If convicted, Zhang would have lost his protection status and been expelled from the United States. In the end, the felony charges in the He Nanfang case were reduced to one charge of battery, a misdemeanor, to which Zhang pleaded no contest on 22 April 2005.

=== Death ===
Zhang was killed in a car accident in Arizona on 31 July 2006, though the official Zhong Gong website would only announce his death one month later.
