= List of the largest Protestant denominations =

Countries by number of Protestants in 2010

Countries by percentage of Protestants in 2010

This is a list of the largest Protestant denominations. It aims to include sizable Protestant Christian communions, federations, alliances, councils, fellowships, and other denominational organizations in the world and provides information regarding the membership thereof. Protestant bodies being considered in this article are divided into:

- transdenominational bodies with more than 50 million members
- international bodies with more than 10 million members
- national bodies with more than 5 million members
- non-national bodies with more than 5 million members

In early 2026, the World Christian Database estimated a total of 637,856,000 Protestants and 426,370,000 Independents (mostly non-denominational Evangelicals, Charismatics, and Pentecostals who do not self-identify as "Protestant"). In 2010, the most numerous international bodies accounted for more than a half of worldwide Protestant population, while the most numerous national bodies accounted for more than 200 of the world's 800 million Protestants.

Transdenominational organizations, such as the World Evangelical Alliance (WEA) and the Pentecostal Fellowship of North America (PCCNA), are usually large and often characterized by overlapping membership, as opposed to international and national bodies. Some of the national groupings cannot be considered churches in mainstream Protestant ecclesiology, even when they constitute a single denomination. Examples of the latter category are the Porvoo Communion, an international organization based in Northern Europe representing 15 Anglican and national Lutheran churches in full communion, and the Protestant Church in Germany (EKD), a federation of national Protestant churches which differ denominationally and encompasses Lutheran, Reformed, and United subchurches.

== Denominational families ==
According to Christianity Global: A Guide to the World's Largest Religion from Afghanistan to Zimbabwe (2022), the largest Protestant denominations self-reported the following number of adherents worldwide in the year 2020:

- 644,260,000 Charismatics and Pentecostals, corresponding to 8.3% of the global population;
- 387,026,000 Evangelicals, corresponding to 5.0% of the global population;
- 97,399,000 Anglicans (not including the United Churches or Continuing Anglicans), corresponding to 1.2% of the global population;
- 84,192,000 Baptists (not including the United Churches), corresponding to 1.1% of the global population;
- 77,792,000 United and Uniting Churches, corresponding to 1.0% of the global population;
- 70,432,000 Presbyterians, Reformed, and Congregationalists (not including the United Churches), corresponding to 0.9% of the global population;
- 69,894,000 Lutherans (not including the United Churches), corresponding to 0.9% of the global population;
- 46,579,000 Methodists and the Holiness movement (not including the United Churches), corresponding to 0.6% of the global population;
- 29,059,000 Non-denominational Churches, corresponding to 0.4% of the global population;
- 29,011,000 Adventists, corresponding to 0.4% of the global population;
- 17,893,000 Latter-Day Saints and Mormons, corresponding to 0.2% of the global population;
- 11,603,000 Restorationists, corresponding to 0.1% of the global population.

== Lists of the largest Protestant bodies ==
=== Transdenominational bodies ===
Transdenominational bodies include people across all denominations that participate in a movement which goes beyond their Protestant branch, like Evangelicalism, the Charismatic movement, or the Neo-charismatic movement. These are of international scope.

Name	Orientation	Foundation	Leadership	Headquarters	Region	Membership	Notes
World Evangelical Alliance	Evangelical	1846; London, England	Secretary-General Thomas Schirrmacher	New York City, NY, United States	Worldwide	424,255,000	Aims to unite Evangelicals worldwide.
Porvoo Communion	Anglican; Lutheran	1992; Porvoo Cathedral, Porvoo, Finland	Co-chairmen Bishop Peter Skov-Jakobsen, Archbishop Michael Jackson	None	Europe	50,000,000	Communion of Anglican and national Lutheran churches in Europe.
Communion of Protestant Churches in Europe	Lutheran; Reformed; Methodist	1973; Hölstein, Switzerland	Secretary-General Mario Fischer	Vienna, Austria	Europe	50,000,000	Communion of Lutheran, Reformed, Methodist, and United denominations in Europe.

=== International bodies ===
International bodies tend to bring together only one Protestant branch which shares common founders, tenets and history. Among the most sizeable international bodies are the World Communion of Reformed Churches, the World Assemblies of God Fellowship, the Anglican Communion, and the Lutheran World Federation, each with more than 70 million members.

All these bodies are worldwide.

Name	Orientation	Founded	Leadership	Headquarters	Membership	Notes
Anglican Communion	Anglican	1867	Archbishop of Canterbury	London, United Kingdom	90,000,000 - 110,000,000 or 114,491,486	Brings together Anglicans from all over the world, is the largest of such organizations, and is one of the largest Protestant communions. Founded at Lambeth Conference, London, England
World Communion of Reformed Churches	Reformed	2010	General Secretary Najla Kassab	Hanover, Lower Saxony, Germany	100,000,000, 108,297,189, or 147,415,704	Brings together Reformed Christians and United and Uniting Churches from all over the world, and is the largest of such organizations. As of 2025, the WCRC is globally one the largest Protestant communions.
World Assemblies of God Fellowship	Pentecostal	1988	General Superintendent and Chairman Doug E. Clay	Springfield, Missouri, United States	86,143,293 – 88,866,189	Brings together a substantial Pentecostal population, although not the majority, as it is scattered in various independent Pentecostal denominations.
Lutheran World Federation	Lutheran	1947	General Secretary Anne Burghardt	Geneva, Canton of Geneva, Switzerland	78,431,111	Brings together Lutherans from all over the world, and is the largest of such organizations.
Baptist World Alliance	Baptist	1905	General Secretary Elijah M. Brown	Falls Church, Virginia, United States	53,871,526	Brings together a substantial Baptist population, although not the majority, as it is scattered in various independent Baptist denominations.
World Methodist Council	Methodist	1881	General Secretary Bishop Ivan M. Abrahams	Waynesville, North Carolina, United States	40,286,617	Brings together Methodists from all over the world, as it is scattered in various independent Methodist denominations.

=== National bodies ===
Although there are "mostly national" denominations like the United Methodist Church (mainly concentrated in the United States), or denominations with dispersed membership like the Apostolic Church and the Church of God (both with membership dispersed around the world) that have a far larger membership than required to be on this list, they operate worldwide and cannot be considered alongside other national bodies like, for example, the Church of Christ in Congo, which operates solely in the Democratic Republic of Congo and is not active beyond that country's borders.

The Church of England, the Church of Christ in Congo, the Three-Self Patriotic Movement, the Assembleias de Deus, and the Protestant Church in Germany constitute the most numerous national bodies with approximately 20 million members each.

Name	Orientation	Foundation	Leadership	Headquarters	Region	Membership	Notes
Three-Self Patriotic Movement	State-regulated theology various Protestant denominations	1951	Chairperson; Fu Xianwei; Secretary General; Xu Xiaohong	Shanghai, China	China	38,000,000	It is the only Protestant denomination approved by the Chinese government. Its theology is regulated and controlled by the state.
Church of Christ in Congo	Methodists, Pentecostals, Baptists, Mennonites, Reformed, Evangelicals, United Protestants	1970	Bishop Pierre Marini Bodho	Kinshasa, Kinshasa Province, Democratic Republic of the Congo	Democratic Republic of the Congo	25,500,000	Federation of most Congolese Protestants. Largest United Protestant denomination worldwide.
Church of Nigeria	Anglican	1979	Primate of all Nigeria, Archbishop of Abuja Province Nicholas Okoh	Abuja, Federal Capital Territory, Nigeria	Nigeria	25,000,000	Local province of the Anglican Communion.
Assembléias de Deus	Pentecostal	1911	General Superintendent José Wellington Bezerra da Costa	São Paulo, State of São Paulo, Brazil	Brazil	22,500,000	Fragmented into smaller units which together gather the vast majority of Brazilian Pentecostals. The largest Pentecostal denomination in the world.
Church of England	Anglican	1534	Supreme Governor King Charles III; Archbishop of Canterbury	London, United Kingdom	England	21,755,000	The country's established church.
Born Again Movement	Evangelicals, Charismatics, Chinese house church	1968		Henan, China	China	20,000,000	House church, not recognized by the Chinese government.
Protestant Church in Germany	Prussian, United, Lutheran, Reformed	1948	Praeses of the Synod Irmgard Schwaetzer; Chairman of the Council of the EKD Heinrich Bedford-Strohm	Hanover, Lower Saxony, Germany	Germany	17,392,072	Federation of most German protestants.
Ethiopian Evangelical Church Mekane Yesus	Lutheran	1959	Bishop Dr. Wakseyoum Idossa	Addis Ababa, Chartered city of Addis Ababa, Ethiopia	Ethiopia	15,000,000	The world's largest Lutheran denomination.
Church of Uganda	Anglican	1897	Archbishop of Uganda and Bishop of Kampala Stanley Ntagali	Namirembe Hill, Kampala District, Uganda	Uganda	13,311,801	Local province of the Anglican Communion.
Southern Baptist Convention	Baptist	1845	President Willy Rice	Nashville, Tennessee, United States	United States	12,311,954	The world's largest Baptist denomination, and the largest Protestant denomination in the United States.
Fangcheng Fellowship	Evangelicals, Charismatics, Chinese house church	1971			China	10,000,000	House church, not recognised by the Chinese government.
Nigerian Baptist Convention	Baptist	1915	Rev. Dr. Samson Olasupo Adeniyi Ayokunle, President (and chief executive officer)	Ibadan	Nigeria	9,015,000	The world's second largest Baptist denomination.
Evangelical Lutheran Church in Tanzania	Lutheran	1963	Bishop Dr. Fredrick Onael Shoo	Arusha, Arusha Region, Tanzania	Tanzania	8,500,000	The world's second largest Lutheran denomination.
National Baptist Convention, USA, Inc.	Baptist	1880	President Dr. Jerry Young	Montgomery, Alabama, United States	United States	8,415,100	The third largest Baptist denomination in the world. It is considered a black church with its membership being largely African American.
China Gospel Fellowship	Evangelicals, Charismatics, Chinese house church	1980s			China	8,000,000	House church, not recognized by the Chinese government.
Church of Christ in Nations	Reformed	1906	Rev. Amos Musa Mohzo	Jos, Plateau, Nigeria	Nigeria	8,000,000	The world's largest Reformed denomination.
Batak Christian Protestant Church	Lutheran	1861		Hutatoruan V, Tarutung, North Sumatra, Indonesia	Indonesia	6,333,000	The world's third largest Lutheran denomination, and the third largest Protestant one in Asia.
Church of Jesus Christ in Madagascar	Reformed	1968	Pastor Ammi Irako Andriamahazosoa		Madagascar	6,000,000	The world's second-largest Reformed denomination.
Anglican Church of Kenya	Anglican	1970	Jackson Ole Sapit	Nairobi, Nairobi County, Kenya	Kenya	5,860,000	Local province of the Anglican Communion.
Presbyterian Church of Nigeria	Reformed	1846			Nigeria	5,800,000	The world's third-largest Reformed denomination.
Church of Sweden	Lutheran	1593	Archbishop of Uppsala Antje Jackelén	Uppsala, Uppsala County, Sweden	Sweden	5,484,000	The world's fourth largest Lutheran denomination, and the fourth largest Protestant one in Europe.
Province of the Episcopal Church of South Sudan	Anglican	2017	Justin Badi Arama	Juba, South Sudan	South Sudan	5,000,000	Local province of the Anglican Communion.
Church of South India	United Churches	1947	The Rt. Rev. K. Reuben Mark		India	5,000,000	

=== Non-national bodies ===
These denominations operate worldwide and cannot be considered alongside other national bodies.

Many sizeable non-national bodies happen to be Pentecostal. The list also includes the largest Adventist church (the Seventh-day Adventist Church), the largest Methodist church (the United Methodist Church) and the largest African initiated church (the Zion Christian Church) and the second largest Pentecostal denomination in the world, The Pentecostal Mission (TPM).

Name	Orientation	Foundation	Leadership	Headquarters	Region	Membership	Notes
Seventh-day Adventist Church	Adventist	1863	Erton Köhler	Silver Spring, Maryland, United States	Worldwide	23,684,237	The world's largest Adventist denomination. Brings together the vast majority of the world's Adventists.
The Apostolic Church	Pentecostal	1911/1916			Worldwide	15,000,000	Trinitarian Pentecostal denomination which emerged from the 1904-1905 Welsh Revival.
Zion Christian Church	African initiated			Zion City Moria, Limpopo, South Africa	Southern Africa	15,000,000	The world's largest African initiated church with Anglican, Pentecostal and evangelical influences.
United Methodist Church	Methodist	1968		None	Worldwide	9,984,925	The world's largest Methodist denomination.
New Apostolic Church International	Irvingian	1863	Chief Apostle Jean-Luc Schneider	Zürich, Switzerland	Worldwide	9,240,000	
Church of God (Cleveland, Tennessee)	Pentecostal	1886	Dr. Tim Hill	Cleveland, Tennessee, U.S.	Worldwide	9,200,000	
International Church of the Foursquare Gospel	Pentecostal			Los Angeles, California, U.S.	Worldwide	9,000,000	
Church of God in Christ	Pentecostal			Memphis, Tennessee, U.S.	Worldwide	6,500,000	

== See also ==
- Christianity and colonialism
  - European colonization of the Americas
  - History of the Puritans in North America
  - Political influence of Evangelicalism in Latin America
  - Protestant missions
    - List of Protestant missionary societies
    - List of Protestant mission societies in Africa
- Protestant Reformation
  - English Reformation
  - Great Awakenings
  - History of Christianity in the United Kingdom
  - History of Christianity in the United States
  - Protestantism by country
  - Protestantism in South America
- List of Christian denominations
  - List of Christian denominations by number of members
- List of megachurches in the United States
- List of religious organizations
- List of Unitarian, Universalist, and Unitarian Universalist churches

== Bibliography ==
- Barreto, Raimundo C. (2021). "Decoloniality and Interculturality in World Christianity: A Latin American Perspective". In Frederiks, Martha; Nagy, Dorottya (eds.). World Christianity: Methodological Considerations. Theology and Mission in World Christianity. Vol. 19. Leiden and Boston: Brill Publishers. pp. 65–91. doi:10.1163/9789004444867_005. ISBN 978-90-04-44486-7. ISSN 2452-2953. JSTOR 10.1163/j.ctv1sr6jvr.7. S2CID 234580589.
- Kim, Sebastian; Kim, Kirsteen (2008). "Christianity as a World Religion". Christianity as a World Religion. London and New York: Continuum International. pp. 1–22. doi:10.5040/9781472548894.ch-001. ISBN 978-1-4725-4889-4. S2CID 152998021.
- Ranger, Terence O. (2006). "Introduction: Evangelical Christianity and Democracy in Africa". In Ranger, Terence O. (ed.). Evangelical Christianity and Democracy in Africa. Oxford and New York: Oxford University Press. pp. 3–36. doi:10.1093/acprof:oso/9780195174779.003.0001. ISBN 9780199871858. LCCN 2005031888.
- Zurlo, Gina A.; Johnson, Todd M. (2024). "Methodology and Sources of Christian and Religious Affiliation". In Ross, Kenneth R.; Mayer, Annemarie C.; Johnson, Todd M. (eds.). Christianity in Western and Northern Europe. Edinburgh Companions to Global Christianity. Edinburgh, Scotland: Edinburgh University Press. pp. 484–501. ISBN 9781399528184. JSTOR 10.3366/jj.9941188.44.
