= Guanyin Famen =

School of Mahayana Buddhism founded in 1988 by Ching Hai

Guanyin Method 觀音法門
- Type: New religious movement
- Classification: Buddhist New religious movement
- Orientation: Mahayana
- Supreme Master: Ching Hai
- Origin: 1984; Neihu District, Taipei
- Other names: Meditation Society of ROC, Ching Hai World Society
- Official website: www.godsdirectcontact.org suprememastertv.com

Guanyin Famen or Quan Yin Buddhism (Chinese: 觀音法門), the teachings of Meditation Society of ROC (Chinese: 中華民國禪定學會) or Ching Hai World Society (Chinese: 清海世界會), is a new religious school of Mahayana Buddhism founded in 1988 by the ethnic-Chinese Vietnamese teacher Ching Hai.

Guanyin Famen is one of the religious organizations officially banned in the People's Republic of China due to its legal status as a "heterodox teaching" (Chinese: 邪教; pinyin: xiéjiào). This designation was first given to the organization in 1995 and was re-affirmed in 2014 and 2017. The China Anti-Cult Network xiéjiào website lists Guanyin Famen as one of eleven "dangerous" groups, a more serious designation than merely appearing on the list of twenty banned groups.

As such, it has made the leap to cyberspace and become a kind of cybersect.

Guanyin Famen advocates daily meditation and a vegetarian lifestyle.

== History ==
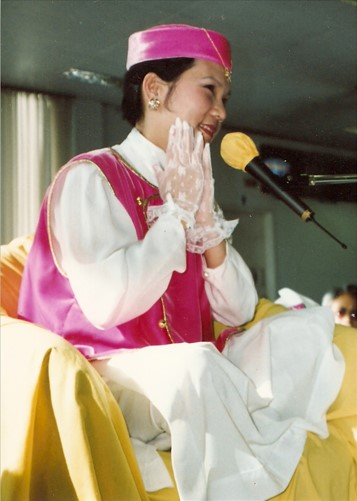
Supreme Master Ching Hai in Sydney, Australia in 1993.

In 1996, following the first Taiwanese presidential election, the government of Taiwan suppressed religious groups that did not support president Lee Teng-Hui during the election, including Guanyin Famen, through asset seizures and media manipulation. In that same year, several American followers donated $640,000 to Bill Clinton's Presidential Legal Defense Fund, which was eventually returned. Following the 1996 United States campaign finance controversy, the fund took caution to what it deemed "suspicious" funding sources.

=== Ban in China ===
The Quan Yin method and Ching Hai's group has been banned in China since 1995. A 2000 report entitled "Notice of the Ministry of Public Security on Several Issues Concerning the Identification and Banning of Cult Organizations" cites anti-communist political activity and the alleged defrauding of millions of dollars from Guanyin method followers as the reason for the ban. In 2017, the China Anti-Cult Network (a branch of the State Council) listed the Guanyin method as one of eleven "dangerous groups".

In 2002, the manager of the Wuhan Zhongzhi Electric Testing Equipment Company was accused by the Chinese authorities of using the business as a cover to "support cult teachings" associated with the Quan Yin method. The enterprise supported thirty practitioners who "masqueraded as employees and business associates." The manager was charged with using the company's offices and buildings as "retreat sites", organizing "initiations" and "screenings" to recruit members, and illegally printing and distributing more than 6,000 copies of cult texts.

=== Ban in Vietnam ===
According to an official statement by Vietnamese authorities:

“Activities spreading superstition affect the social fabric. They have the clearest and broadest influence on the population in places where these new religions (heresy, strange faiths) appear: Supreme Master Ching Hai, Long Hoa Maitreya, Treasured Temple of the Three Religions, Protestant Word of Life…”

== Quan Yin method ==
Ching Hai first demonstrated the "Immeasurable Light Meditation Center and the Way of Sound Contemplation", or Quan Yin method of meditation, in Miaoli, Taiwan. The Quan Yin method involves meditation on the "inner light and the inner sound" of God or the Buddha. Ching claims that the Bible acknowledges the existence of this method, and that it has been used by most major religions. She also preaches that enlightenment in Buddhism, as demonstrated by the Gautama and Guanyin Buddhas, is achieved through the method.

The Quan Yin method's full initiation involves a life-long commitment to a vegan diet, adherence to the Five Precepts of Buddhism, and at least two hours of meditation daily. A shorter form of initiation requires a half hour of meditation daily and abstinence from meat for ten days each month.

A 2015 Immigration and Refugee Board of Canada research report states that some consider the method to be a Buddhist movement. The World Religions and Spirituality Project has written: "Ching Hai’s teaching against violence towards animals is very similar to Sikhism, but her meditation teachings resemble Buddhism, and her Catholic background enables her to incorporate Christian Bible teachings as well." Religious studies scholar Jennifer Eichman notes that this particular meditation method is not part of the standard Buddhist repertoire. Ching's synthesis of the method uses a combination of jargon from Christianity, Buddhism, and Hinduism.

Religious studies scholars, including Michael York, include Ching Hai in the Indian contemporary Sant Mat movements which involve the initiation of a member from a lineage guru or master.

== See also ==
- Loving Hut
- Supreme Master Television
- Heterodox teachings (Chinese law)
