= True Buddha School =

Buddhist organization

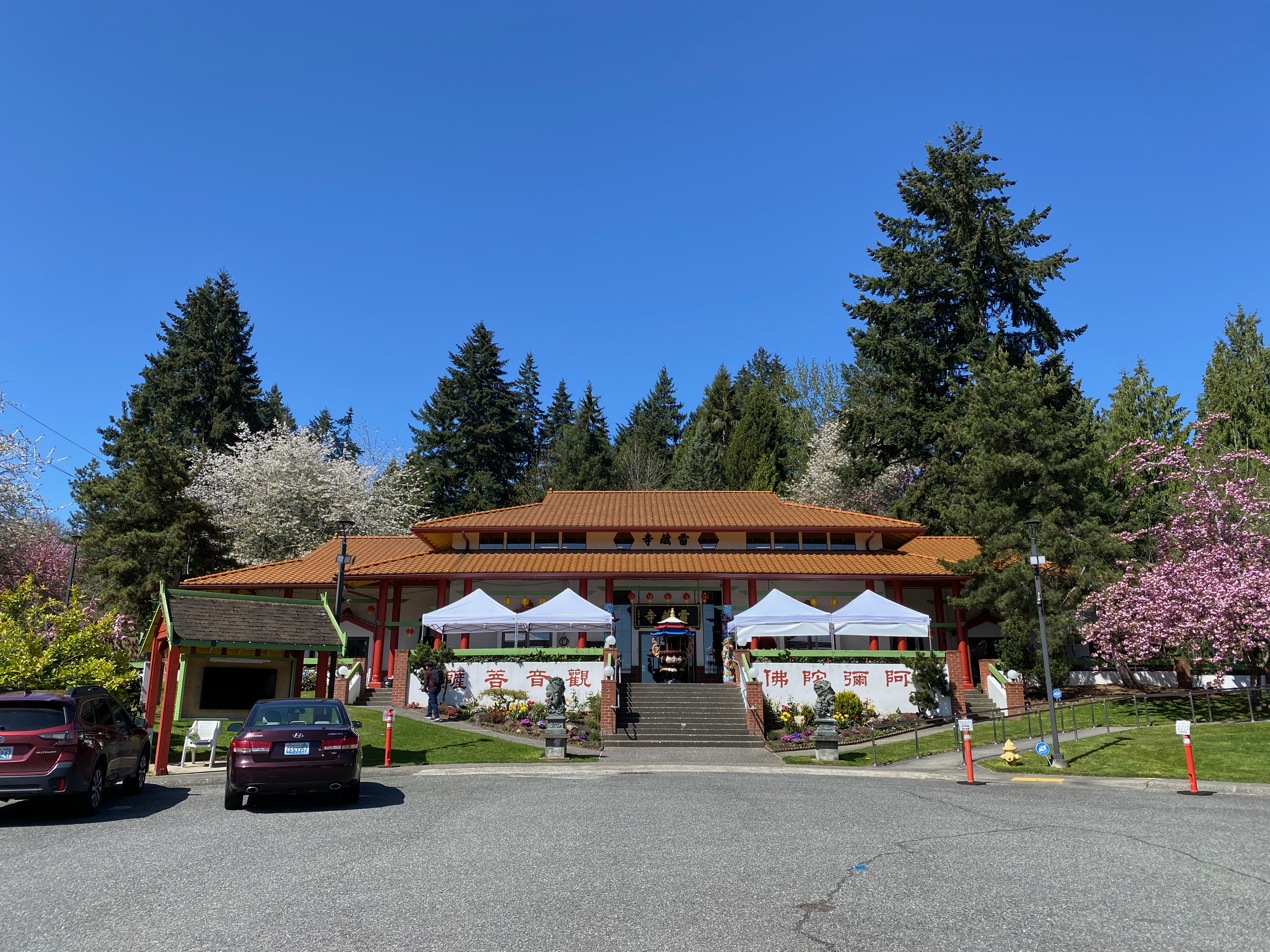
The school's main temple, the Ling Shen Ching Tze Temple in Redmond.

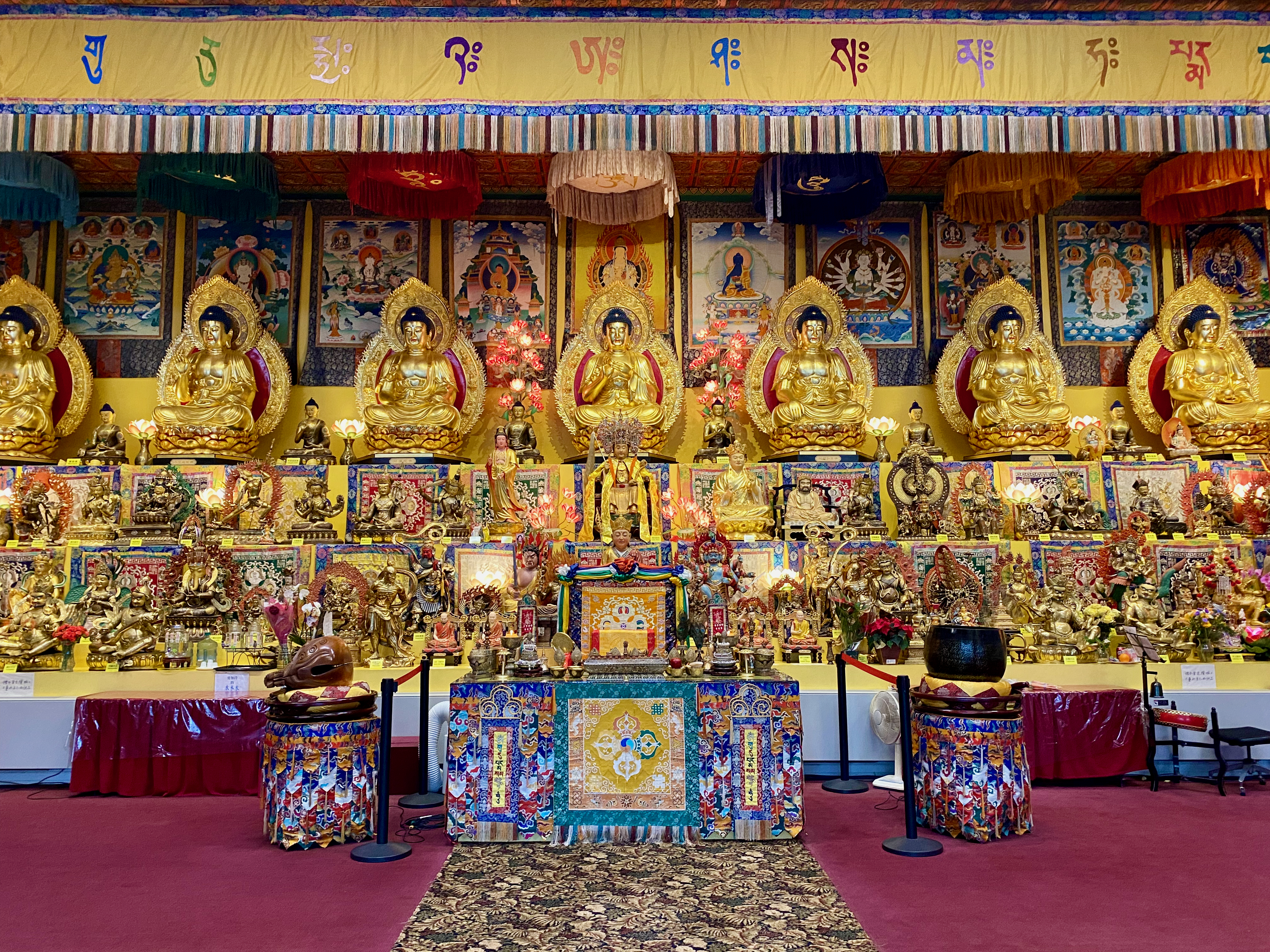
The main shrine in the main temple

The True Buddha School (Chinese: 真佛宗; pinyin: Zhēn Fó Zōng; Pe̍h-ōe-jī: Chin-hu̍t-chong) is a Mahayana Buddhist sect founded in the 1970s. While predominantly focused on Buddhist teachings and practices, it also includes practices and deities from Taoism. Its headquarters are in Redmond, Washington, USA, and the school has a large following in Taiwan and East Asia. There are also many temples and chapters worldwide. In China, the sect is reportedly on a list of banned religious organisations.

In 1975 Lu Sheng-yen established Ling Xian Zong (School of Efficacious Immortals) in Taiwan and he officially changed its name to True Buddha School in 1983. Lu's followers call him "His Holiness Living Buddha Lian Sheng." Lu has written 306 books [as of May 2025].

True Buddha School's funding relies heavily on donations, supplemented by the income from the publication from Lu's books. The money is distributed through the Sheng-Yen Lu Foundation and the Lotus Light Charity Society, which has branches in Vancouver and Singapore.

== Teachings ==
The True Buddha School teachings follow a specific sequence of spiritual cultivation. The first level involves 100,000 sessions of the outer practices of the four preliminaries, (known as Ngöndro in Tibetan Buddhism). These preliminaries include Vajrasattva yoga, a great repentance yoga to purify bad karma. This is followed by Guru Yoga and Personal Deity yoga.

The second level contains the inner energy practices, similar to those found in Tibetan Buddhism, such as Treasure Vase Energy Yoga, followed by the Inner Fire practice to open the central channel.

The third level (the "Secret Practices") is the opening of the five chakras, and the Heruka practices.

The final level (the "Most Secret Practices") is the Great Perfection of Dzogchen.

== Chapters ==
The school has chapters in North America, Europe, Asia, Australia, and Latin America. The main temple, the Ling Shen Ching Tze Temple, is located in Redmond, Washington, USA.

The majority of the school's followers are in Asia, and in North America, Australia, and Europe the majority of the students are Asian immigrants or of Asian descent.
