= Holy Spirit of Blood and Water Church =

Taiwanese Christian cult

- Chinese: 血水圣灵
Transcriptions

The Holy Spirit of Blood and Water Church was founded by Zokun in August 1988 in Taiwan. At the time of its establishment, the government of the Republic of China decided that it had cult-like tendencies and suppressed it. Taiwan's famous theological education website "Reformed Righteousness Network" characterizes the "Holy Spirit of Blood and Water" as a heresy. In 1987, it began its missionary activities in mainland China and was recognized as a cult by the Government of the People's Republic of China in 1995.
