= Kees W. Bolle =

Dutch historian

- Born: December 2, 1927; Dordrecht, Netherlands
- Died: October 14, 2012 (aged 84); Biddeford, Maine

Academic background
- Education: Leiden University; University of Chicago
- Doctoral advisor: Mircea Eliade

Academic work
- Discipline: History
- Sub-discipline: History of religion
- Institutions: University of California, Los Angeles
- Main interests: Indian religions

Cornelis Willem (Kees) Bolle (December 2, 1927 - October 14, 2012) was a Dutch historian who was Professor of the History of Religions at the University of California, Los Angeles.

== Biography ==
Kees W. Bolle was born in Dordrecht, Netherlands on 2 December 1927. He studied theology at Leiden University, and the history of religion and Sanskrit at the universities of Chicago and Madras. He received his PhD in the history of religion at the University of Chicago in 1961. Bolle wrote his thesis in India and was supervised by Mircea Eliade.

After gaining his PhD, Bolle lectured at Brown University. In the 1960s, Bolle was appointed Professor of the History of Religion at the University of California, Los Angeles (UCLA). Here he set up a nationally recognized undergraduate major in the interdisciplinary study of religion Bolle retired as Professor Emeritus in 1991, and subsequently moved to Portland, Oregon, and then moved to Maine in 2000 where he died on October 14, 2012.

== Selected works ==
- The Freedom of Man in Myth, 1968
- The Persistence of Religions, 1971
- The Enticement of Religion, 2002
- Religion Among People, 2017

== Sources ==
- "Cornelis Willem (Kees) Bol". Dutch Studies (in Dutch). 31 December 2016.
- "Kees W. Bolle". Portland Press Herald. October 26, 2012.
