= Zhong Gong =

Chinese organisation

- Simplified Chinese: 中华养生益智功
- Traditional Chinese: 中華養生益智功
Transcriptions
Standard Mandarin
- Hanyu Pinyin: Zhōnghuá Yǎngshēng Yì Zhì Gōng
- Wade–Giles: Chung^{1}hua^{2} Yang^{3}sheng^{1} I^{4} Chih^{4} Kung^{1}
- IPA: [ʈʂʊ́ŋ.xwǎ jàŋ.ʂə́ŋ î ʈʂî kʊ́ŋ]
Yue: Cantonese
- Yale Romanization: Jūng-wàh Yeúhng-sāang Yīk Ji Gūng
- Jyutping: zung1 waa4 joeng5 saang1 jik1 zi3 gung1
- IPA: [tsʊŋ˥ wa˧ jœŋ˩˧ saŋ˥ jɪk̚˥ tsi˧ kʊŋ˥]

Alternative Chinese name
- Chinese: 中功
Transcriptions
Standard Mandarin
- Hanyu Pinyin: Zhōng Gōng
- Wade–Giles: Chung^{1} Kung^{1}
- IPA: [ʈʂʊ́ŋ kʊ́ŋ]
Yue: Cantonese
- Yale Romanization: Jūng Gūng
- Jyutping: zung1 gung1
- IPA: [tsʊŋ˥ kʊŋ˥]

Zhong Gong (中功) is a spiritual movement based on qigong founded in 1987 by Zhang Hongbao. The full name (中华养生益智功) translates to "China Health Care and Wisdom Enhancement Practice." The system differentiated itself from other qigong practices through its structured organizational approach and commercial model, which aimed to establish a nationwide network of schools and healing centers in China during the 1990s.

Born in Harbin as a high school teacher and Chinese Communist Party member, Zhang developed Zhonggong in the late 1980s amid the 'qigong fever' that gripped China during the Deng Xiaoping era. The group attracting widespread attention through claims of supernatural abilities and a biography selling ten million copies. At its peak, Zhong Gong had an extensive network of schools, instructors, and practitioners, and its influence extended across various social and institutional levels, with the group claiming up to 38 million followers and 100,000 employees nationwide by the mid-1990.

In 1999, Chinese authorities declared Zhong Gong an illegal organization, citing concerns over its influence and structure. As a result, its assets—including those of the 3,000 entities that made up the Unicorn Group—were confiscated, and 600 key members were arrested. Following these events, the organization faced significant challenges in maintaining its activities. With an arrest warrant issued against him, Zhang Hongbao fled to the United States, where he applied for political asylum. He was granted protective resident status on June 13, 2001. Zhang died in July 2006 in a car accident.

After Zhang's death, his former secretary Zhang Xiao reportedly continued promoting Zhong Gong teachings and was described as having taken a leading role in overseas and fragmented continuation efforts. During the COVID-19 pandemic, associated practitioners introduced a set of anti-COVID-19 qigong exercises as a response to COVID-19.

== History and development ==
In the aftermath of the 1989 Tiananmen Square protests and massacre, Zhang relocated to a remote area in Sichuan, where he restructured his organization within a network of private enterprises under the Qilin Group. This allowed his followers to continue practicing and studying within an organized framework.

During the early 1990s, Zhong Gong became the most popular of the various qigong schools. Its commercial activities were incorporated in China as the Unicorn Group (麒麟集团), a collectively ownership enterprise. In Mainland China, it had numerous operations, branches, and staff. There were six subordinate divisions, including Qigong training, healthy living, travel, education, medical.

Political scientist Patricia M. Thornton at the University of Oxford lists Zhong Gong as an example of a cybersect, due to the group's reliance on the internet for text distribution, recruitment and information-sharing among adherents.

== Beliefs and teachings ==
Palmer, citing Ji Yi, said Zhang developed a style of Qigong which was based on automation, physics, relativity, bionics, and with distinctive use of mechanical engineering jargon, and founded Zhong Gong in 1987, launching it on the auspicious date of 8 August 1987.

Zhong Gong is based on the "qilin culture" (麒麟文化), created by Zhang in 1987 which, as he claimed in 2000, is "an obvious challenge to Marxism and the CCP's one-party rule". According to Zhang's 'spirit-matter dialectics', both spirit and matter have objective existence and can transform into the other under certain circumstances. In 1992, based on the ancient theories of yin and yang, Zhang extrapolated his universal law of motion according to which all objects or matter can subdivide into 'Yin' or 'Yang', predicting anything or act which contravened it would bring eventual disaster. He asserted Marxist property right theory and the derived Communist Party aim to eliminate private property were in conflict with his laws. In 1993, Zhang advanced his theories of 'promotion-restriction-inhibition-transformation'. In 1998, Zhang put forward a moral code which he referred to as "eight virtues and eight calls".

== Qilin culture ==
'Qilin Culture' philosophy was developed by Zhang Hongbao, the master of Zhong Gong, and proclaimed during public lectures in Beijing.

According to a well-known account by Ji Yi, a journalist and enthusiastic qigong practitioner himself, "the qilin combines in a single body the essence of different species of living beings: the dragon's head, the pig's nose, the serpent's scales, the deer's body, the tiger's back, the bear's thighs, the ox's hooves and the lion's tail."

According to Zhang, Qilin culture was composed of eight interconnected systems. The philosophical system was based on the traditional "Diagram of Ultimate Return," which explains the origin of all living beings, their functions, and ultimate destinies. The life sciences system focused on using qi to explore and understand the mysteries of biological systems. The special medicine system represented a unique approach to healing that differed significantly from both traditional Chinese and Western medicine. The art and aesthetics system encompassed Qigong-inspired art, architecture, dance, and music. The educational system provided a structured approach to learning and knowledge transmission. The industrial and political management system applied Qilin principles to governance and organizational structures. The daily life system established guidelines for personal conduct and social interactions. Finally, the health preservation and spiritual cultivation system focused on techniques for maintaining well-being and advancing spiritual growth.

== Organizational techniques ==
Zhang Hongbao established two organizations that laid the foundation for what eventually became a highly structured network of interrelated enterprises, powered by a Qigong practice, as noted by Patricia Thornton.

More than any other Qigong system, Zhong Gong developed a systematic training program with eight progressive levels, providing practitioners with a clear and structured path for advancement. Unlike other Qigong schools, which focused primarily on sitting meditation, movement practices, and inner alchemy, Zhong Gong's approach emphasized the acquisition of specific skills through targeted workshops. Each workshop was designed to ensure that participants could fully grasp and apply a new skill within a few days of training.

Stage one included basic techniques and posters; stage two covered organizational methods, certain qigong performance arts, and the 'secret of secrets' of Buddhist and Taoist techniques; stage three consisted of still meditation, qigong hypnosis, and spontaneous qigong; stage four included more advanced qigong techniques like electric qigong, hard qigong etc., while stage five covered Fengshui, massage, regulation of the emotions, and more. The sixth, seventh, and eighth levels were never disclosed to the public.

Zhong Gong attracted a large and dedicated following across China, elaborating a highly organized structure that led Chinese Communist Party authorities to suspect it may turn into an opposing political force.

The Qilin Culture management philosophy, rooted in traditional yin-yang and five-elements cosmology, served as the guiding framework for the Zhong Gong organization. According to David Palmer, this system was designed to be applicable to various aspects of life, including family, business, and governance. It aimed to integrate and harmonize key aspects of human social development, drawing insights from different historical models, including primitive society, slave society, feudal society, capitalist society, and communist society.

== Ban in China ==
The 12th session of the NPC Standing Committee passed a resolution allowing the government to take action against groups classified as "heretic cults." and which applied retroactively to Falun Gong, Zhong Gong and any other spiritual groups deemed a potential threat to the state.

However, Zhong Gong has been much more low key than Falun Gong, and the government crackdown on it is almost unknown in China. Palmer describes how Zhong Gong effectively ceased to exist once the organisation was no longer able to provide material and social benefits to its followers.

As a sign of Zhang's acumen, Thornton notes that when the Beijing daily reported that his Beijing-based International Qigong Service Enterprise had been shut down pending an investigation into possible criminal activities, Zhang hired the team of lawyers who had defended Mao's widow during the Gang of Four trial, and managed to gain a public apology from the paper. A five-year string of unsuccessful legal actions against the government followed, during which Zhang managed to elude arrest.

After Zhong Gong was officially declared illegal, the organization's assets and those of its 3,000 affiliated entities within the Unicorn Group were confiscated, and 600 key figures were detained. When an arrest warrant was issued for Zhang, he fled to the United States, where he applied for political asylum. While his request was not granted, he received Protective Resident Status on June 13, 2001. Zhang died in a motor accident on July 31, 2006, at the age of 52.

While Zhong Gong's public presence faded after his death, Zhong Gong continued to operate in reduced or fragmented form outside mainland China under leadership associated with Zhang Xiao, described as the late founder's former secretary. Zhang Xiao later introduced a set of anti-COVID-19 qigong exercises which were reportedly successful during the COVID-19 pandemic. According to a Chinese police report cited by Bitter Winter, a publication focused on religious liberty issues, authorities discovered a massage parlour in Fuyuan, Heilongjiang, which was allegedly selling Zhonggong teachings and artifacts described as being "blessed" by Zhang Xiao.
