= China Gospel Fellowship =

Pentecostal house church network

The China Gospel Fellowship (Chinese: 中华福音团契，也称中华福音会，简称中福), also known as the Tanghe Fellowship (唐河团契), is one of the largest evangelical Christian religious movements in China, and is a house church network formed in the province of Henan. It has approximately 5 million members.

== History ==
The China Gospel Fellowship, or Tanghe Fellowship was founded in the 1980s.

In 2002, Eastern Lightning, a Chinese Christian new religious movement, allegedly kidnapped 34 of the Fellowship's leading members and held them for two months. In 2004, more than 100 leaders of the church were arrested as part of governmental raids against unregistered churches. Sources consider it to be among the largest Protestant denominations in the world, and the third largest in China, behind the state-supported Three-Self Patriotic Movement and the Fangcheng Fellowship.

== See also ==
- List of the largest Protestant bodies
