= Fenggang Yang =

Chinese sociologist

Fenggang Yang (simplified Chinese: 杨凤岗; traditional Chinese: 楊鳳崗; born 1962) is professor of sociology and founding director of the Center on Religion and Chinese Society at Purdue University. He was elected and served as the president of the Society for the Scientific Study of Religion in 2014–15, the first Chinese American, nonwhite president since the founding of the association in 1949. He is also the founding president of the East Asian Society for the Scientific Study of Religion in 2018–2020. Fenggang Yang is openly Christian and has spoken critically and frequently in international media about China's lack of religious freedom. His theories based on the social scientific methods have been criticized as biased in favor of Christianity by many other scholars of Chinese religion who are in religious studies, anthropology or sinology. He is known for his theory of a triple "religious market" in China.

== Triple "religious market" theory ==
In 2006, Yang advanced the theory that, under heavy regulation, various religions are divided into three "markets": a "red market" of recognized religions, including the five officially approved religions of Buddhism, Daoism, Islam, Catholicism, and Protestant Christianity, a "gray market" of unrecognized and legally undefined religions, including folk religions and others, and a "black market" of illegal religions, including what the Chinese government has called xiejiao (evil cults). According to him, the more the red market is controlled and co-opted by the state, the more this leads to the growth of the black and the gray markets.

== "Shortage Economy" theory ==
In 2010, Yang further articulates a theory of "shortage economy," arguing that when religious supply was suppressed by the state, religious demand was reduced to some extent, but also expressed as forced substitution, semi-forced substitution, searching for alternatives, and searching for religion. He claims that he borrows the shortage economic concepts by economist Janos Kornai, but Kornai's economics focus on the supply-side. In contrast, Yang's theory focus on the demand side, claiming that the shortage economy of religion explains the churning of alternative spiritualities as well as conventional religions in Communist China. The supply-side theorists, such as sociologists Rodney Stark and Roger Finke, and economist Lawrence Iannoccone, strongly disagree on this theory.

== Criticism ==
The Center on Religion and Chinese Society (later renamed as the Center on Religion and the Global East) is funded by the Templeton Foundation, an American organization open to Christian-related research in the field of religious studies. Fenggang Yang was primarily funded by the Templeton Foundation to develop his projects along with other smaller grants.

Many scholars of Chinese religion, including Lu Yunfeng, Ji Zhe, Stephan Feuchtwang, Wang Mingming, Adam Chau, Yang Der-ruey, Qu Jingdong, Chen Jinguo, Liang Yongjia and Cao Nanlai, have been critical of Fenggang Yang's theories about religion in China. According to them, Yang's theories are modeled on Christianity, reduce religion to a mere social phenomenon (he defines religion as "a unified system of beliefs and practices about life and the world relative to the supernatural") and miss the Chinese and English anthropological research of the last century.

Ji Zhe has criticized them as "a projection of fantasy with a certain kind of Christian root". According to Liang Yongjia, Yang's "religious market" theory rests upon a distinction of "politics" and "religion" that is typical of liberal systems but not of Chinese culture. The theory also has an intrinsic idea of "competition" between religions that is typical of Abrahamic religions such as Christianity, but unknown to the nature of Chinese society, in which grassroots non-institutional religions prevail. Furthermore, Yang wrongly considers post-1949 China's governance of religion to be different from that of pre-1949 China. Another critique expressed by Liang is that Yang's theories imply that folk religions are an "inferior" form of religion, while his definition of "(true) religion" is a Biblical/Christian one. Ultimately, Yang's "religious market" theory is regarded as functional to the neoliberal construction of the market economy.

The limitations of Yang's theories have also been illustrated by Vincent Goossaert, a scholar of Chinese religion at the École pratique des hautes études in Paris. He speaks of a "total absence of historical reflexion", in Yang's studies, about Buddhism and Taoism, but especially Chinese folk religions. The latter, which comprise cultural communities devoted to local deities and individual spiritual techniques, are classified by Yang as the legally undefined "gray market" of "semi-, quasi- and pseudo-religions", standing between the fully legal "red market" of what Yang considers "true religions" (whose prototype is Christianity) and the illegal "black market" of religions forbidden by the Chinese government (such as Falun Gong and Eastern Lightning). Yang claims that contemporary China's policies on religion hamper the growth of the red and black markets while leaving free space for the gray market to develop, and if China will liberalize religion completely, the "religious consumers" would mostly turn to "true religions". Goossaert rebuts that folk religions are not inferior forms of religion, have deep historical roots and a history of negotiation with the government, and are the largest form of religion in contemporary China, far from being "consumer goods" ready to be replaced by better ones.

The Chinese scholar Mou Zhongjian advanced an alternative paradigm to that of the "religious market", actually preceding the latter in time. In 2006, Mou put forward the model of "religious ecology" for the study of religion in China, which has been welcomed ad developed by a number of other scholars, including Chen Xiaoyi and Li Xiangping. Mou's theory is based upon Julian Steward's idea of multilinear evolution and views Chinese religions as a self-contained and internally structured "social life system", which continuously develops through internal renewal and external interactions, with no distinction between the "religious" and the "secular" realm.

Debate over Chinese Christian population projections

In his 2016 presidential address to the Society for the Scientific Study of Religion, Yang projected that China's Protestant Christian population would grow at an annual rate of 7 to 10 percent, potentially making China the country with the largest Protestant population by 2030 and a Christian majority by 2050. This projection, based on extrapolating historical government statistics and Pew Research Center estimates from 1950 to 2010, has been challenged by subsequent scholarship. A 2025 study by Conrad Hackett and Yunping Tong, published in Socius, analyzed 19 nationally representative surveys conducted since the early 2000s—including the Chinese General Social Survey (CGSS), China Family Panel Studies, and the World Values Survey—and found no clear evidence that Christianity in China continues to grow as a share of the population, with self-identified Christians hovering around 2 percent in recent years. Hackett and Tong also found no empirical support for Yang's suggestion that survey data after 2013 might be unreliable due to increased government hostility toward religion, noting that longitudinal analysis showed Christian identification to be "relatively unresponsive" to increased government regulations. Despite these findings, Yang has continued to publicly question the credibility of post-2012 survey data without withdrawing his earlier projections. In March 2026, Yang appeared on The Narrative, the podcast of the Center for Christian Virtue (CCV), an Ohio-based Christian lobbying organization, where he reiterated that China's underground church is growing rapidly and that the country is on track to become the world's largest Christian nation. CCV has publicly characterized the separation of church and state as a misunderstood concept that has been weaponized to silence religious voices. In addition, Yang's position on survey data from China has drawn attention because of a distinction between his criticism of existing Chinese survey datasets and his own center's later survey work in China. While In 2023, Yang criticized Pew Research Center's reliance on China-based survey data, stating that the surveys were "sponsored and supervised by the Chinese Communist authorities" and that their quality was "unknown or in serious doubt" in the post-2012 political environment. In 2024, however, the Center on Religion and the Global East described the Global East Survey of Religion and Spirituality as having conducted survey research in "Manchuria and Guangdong of China", among other locations, of which Yang is the Principal Investigator. And the Chinese survey was partially funded by CCP's Ministry of Education, a branch of Chinese government.

- Yang, Fenggang; White, Chris, eds. (2021). Christian Social Activism and Rule of Law in Chinese Societies. Bethlehem: Lehigh University Press. ISBN 978-1-61146-323-1.
- Yang, Fenggang (2018). Atlas of Religion in China: Social and Geographical Contexts. Leiden: Brill. ISBN 978-90-04-36990-0.
- Yang, Fenggang (2012). Religion in China: Survival and Revival under Communist Rule. New York: Oxford University Press. ISBN 978-0-19-973564-8.
- Yang, Fenggang (1999). Chinese Christians in America: Conversion, Assimilation, and Adhesive Identities. Penn State University Press. ISBN 978-0-271-01917-8.
- Yang, Fenggang (2006). "The Red, Black and Gray Markets of Religion in China". The Sociological Quarterly. 47 (1): 93–122. doi:10.1111/j.1533-8525.2006.00039.x. S2CID 55371850.
