= Gong Shengliang =

Founder and leader of the South China Church

Pastor Gong Shengliang (龚圣亮) is the founder and leader of the South China Church, an evangelical house-church fellowship that claimed 50,000 members across several Chinese provinces including Hubei. In December 2001, he was convicted and sentenced to death under China's anti-cult legislation. Responding to international pressure, China commuted his sentence to life imprisonment for assault and rape charges. In 2006, his prison sentence was further reduced to 19 years. According to his relatives, Gong was tortured and beaten severely during his incarceration, also by fellow prisoners.

== Religious persecution ==
He was sentenced to death in 2001, but because of international pressure, the sentence was reduced to life. Some who testified against Gong later stated that they were tortured into doing so by Communist officials. Liu Xianzhi, a former leader in the South China Church, has sought asylum in the United States and gives extensive testimony on the details of Pastor Gong Shengliang's case. There are also reports that he has been beaten and mistreated in prison. Over several weeks in late May and early June 2003, it was reported that he lapsed in and out of a coma and was bleeding internally, and that he nearly died from a savage beating in prison in June 2003.

In 2013 Pastor Shengliang's daughter in an open letter to Xi Jinping, General Secretary of the Chinese Communist Party, asked for his help. According to her, her father had not received medical treatment over the past ten years. His condition is now life-threatening. A heart attack at the end of 2012 left him unable to walk or speak. His daughter is asking for his release to receive urgent medical treatment.

== See also ==
- List of China-related topics
- List of Chinese people
