= Beili Wang =

Christian new religious movement in China

The Anointed King / Beili Wang (被立王) (also known as The Established King) is a new religious movement of Christian origin in the People's Republic of China, which possibly had more than 100,000 members at its peak.

The group was founded in 1987 by Wu Yangming (吴扬明), formerly of The Shouters. Wu declared that he was Jesus Christ returned to Earth. He was executed on rape charges in 1995. Beili Wang has been banned in the People's Republic of China since 1995.

The group emphasizes eschatology and is in favor of a Christian empire. It has been present in Anhui, Hunan, Guangdong and possibly other areas (including Taiwan and Southeast Asia).

== See also ==
- Heterodox teachings (Chinese law)
- Protestantism in China
