= Fangcheng Fellowship =

The Fangcheng Fellowship (Chinese: 方城团契), also known as the China for Christ Church, is a Christian movement in the People's Republic of China.

Getting its name from the Fangcheng district of Henan Province, it was established in the early 1970s by Li Tianen and experienced major growth in the 1980s. It expanded to become one of the largest house church networks with, as of 2010, an estimated ten million members. If considered Protestant, it constitutes one of the largest Protestant denominations in the world, and the second largest in China, behind the state-supported Three-Self Patriotic Movement.

== See also ==
- List of the largest Protestant bodies
