= Eastern Lightning =

Chinese new religious movement

The Church of Almighty God 全能神教会
- Type: Non-Trinitarian Church
- Classification: Christian new religious movement
- Scripture: Christian Bible, The Word Appears in the Flesh
- Administrative leader: Zhao Weishan
- Region: People's Republic of China (original); Singapore, South Korea, Taiwan, United States, Canada, Australia, and other countries (claimed)
- Language: Standard Chinese
- Origin: 1991; China
- Branched from: The Shouters
- Members: 3–4 million (Chinese government estimate); 2 million (Holly Folk estimate)
- Other name: Eastern Lightning
- Official website: www.holyspiritspeaks.org

Eastern Lightning

Eastern Lightning
- Traditional Chinese: 東方閃電
- Simplified Chinese: 东方闪电
Transcriptions
Standard Mandarin
- Hanyu Pinyin: Dōngfāng Shǎndiàn
- IPA: [tʊ́ŋfáŋ ʂàntjɛ̂n]
Hakka
- Pha̍k-fa-sṳ: Tûng-fông Sám-thien
Yue: Cantonese
- Yale Romanization: Dūng-fōng Sím-dihn
- Jyutping: dung1 fong1 sim2 din6
- IPA: [tʊŋ˥ fɔŋ˥ sim˧˥ tin˨]
Southern Min
- Hokkien POJ: Tong-hong Siám-tiān

The Church of the Almighty God
- Traditional Chinese: 全能神教會
- Simplified Chinese: 全能神教会
Transcriptions
Standard Mandarin
- Hanyu Pinyin: Quánnéng Shén Jiàohuì
- IPA: [tɕʰwǎnnə̌ŋ ʂə̌n tɕjâʊxwêɪ]
Hakka
- Pha̍k-fa-sṳ: Chhiòn-nèn Sṳ̀n Kau-fi
Yue: Cantonese
- Yale Romanization: Chyùhn-nàhng Sàhn Gaau-wuih
- Jyutping: cyun4 nang4 san4 gaau3 wui6
- IPA: [tsʰyn˩ nɐŋ˩ sɐn˩ kaw˧ wuj˨]
Southern Min
- Hokkien POJ: Choân-lêng Sîn Kàu-hōe
Eastern Min
- Fuzhou BUC: Ciòng-nèng Sìng Gáu-huôi

The Church of Almighty God (Note: Always written with a capital T in "The") (simplified Chinese: 全能神教会; traditional Chinese: 全能神教會; pinyin: Quánnéng Shén Jiàohuì), also known as Eastern Lightning (simplified Chinese: 东方闪电; traditional Chinese: 東方閃電; pinyin: Dōngfāng Shǎndiàn), is a monotheistic new religious movement which was established in China in 1991. Government sources estimate the group has three to four million members.

The group was founded by a physics teacher and part-time preacher named Zhao Weishan who claimed that Jesus Christ has returned to earth and is presently living as a Chinese woman from central China known as "Lightning Deng". Lightning Deng is also reportedly known as Yang Xiangbin, Zhao's alleged mistress. The name "Eastern Lightning" alludes to the Gospel of Matthew 24:27: "For as the lightning cometh out of the east, and shineth even unto the west; so shall also the coming of the Son of man be."

The movement has been described by Chinese media as the nation's 'most dangerous xie jiao', and the group has been formally banned in China since 1995. In 2001, both Zhao and Yang were granted asylum in the United States, where the movement is now headquartered. Christian opponents and international media have in turn described it as a cult and even as a terrorist organization. In contrast, members of the group deny all accusations and argue they are victims of religious persecution at the hands of Chinese authorities.

== Sources ==
Scholars who have tried to study the group have complained that, due to its "secretive" nature and the fact that in China it operates underground, researching Eastern Lightning is difficult, and media coverage is only partially reliable.

Two books on the group were published by Western academic presses. Brill published Lightning from the East by Emily Dunn in 2015, and Oxford University Press published Inside The Church of Almighty God by Massimo Introvigne in 2020. Holly Folk, a professor at Western Washington University, reported in 2020 that she is observing Eastern Lightning through a participant observation study since 2016.

Due to the growing influx of refugees from Eastern Lightning who seek asylum abroad, some national authorities have published reports on the group. In 2019, the Immigration and Refugee Board of Canada published a compilation of its interviews with scholars about Eastern Lightning. In the same year, the National Commission for the Right of Asylum of the Italian Ministry of the Interior published and shared with the other European Union countries through the European Asylum Support Office a report on "Persecution for religious reasons in China: Church of Almighty God."

== History ==
Zhao Weishan

Administrative leader of The Church of Almighty God

Personal details
- Born: December 12, 1951 Acheng District, Harbin, Heilongjiang, China
- Profession: Teacher

In 1991, a woman began distributing mimeographed texts containing revelations that she claimed came from the Holy Spirit among Chinese house churches, many of which were affiliated with The Shouters. Her name was not given in the group's literature, but she is believed to have been Yang Xiangbin (b. 1973, simplified Chinese: 杨向彬; traditional Chinese: 楊向彬; pinyin: Yáng Xiàngbīn). Chinese authorities have claimed that Yang had a history of mental health problems.

Zhao Weishan (simplified Chinese: 赵维山; traditional Chinese: 趙維山; pinyin: Zhào Wéishān; born December 12, 1951), a former physics teacher, had been involved in several Christian new religious movements. In 1986, Zhao was a member of a Christian house church, and in 1987 he was baptized into a branch of The Shouters, a group targeted by the Chinese government as a xie jiao (cult). Zhao rose to a leadership position within the group and, according to Chinese governmental sources, preached that he was himself the "Lord of Ability."

In 1989, the Shouters were labeled a xie jiao by the Chinese government and officially banned. In 1991, Zhao met Yang Xiangbin and quickly became the main leader of her small group, where he was recognized as "the Man used by the Holy Spirit." According to one estimate, by 1991, the organization had more than a thousand members. In 1992, Yang's revelations propagated by Zhao announced that Yang herself was more than a prophetic voice; in fact, she was the second coming of Jesus Christ on earth and the incarnated Almighty God. Since then, Yang was referred to as "he" rather than "she," as she was in fact regarded as Jesus Christ. Chinese media started taking an interest in the religious community, and referred to Yang (sometimes also mentioned as "Deng"), as "the female Christ."

In 1995, the group was classified as a xie jiao by China's Ministry of Public Security. On September 6, 2000, both Zhao and Yang entered the United States; they were granted religiopolitical asylum the following year. Since then, they live in and direct the movement from New York.

== Beliefs ==
Eastern Lightning holds that Jesus has returned as a Chinese woman, worshiped by the religious group as Almighty God, hence its official name. The group is non-Trinitarian, and teaches a form of millennialism. The group publishes the revelations of its female Almighty God; most of them are collected in The Word Appears in the Flesh (simplified Chinese: 话在肉身显现; traditional Chinese: 話在肉身顯現; pinyin: Huà zài ròushēn xiǎnxiàn). The group is anti-Communist, identifying the Great Red Dragon of the Book of Revelation with the Chinese Communist Party. Radio Free Europe reports that the group considers resistance to the Community Party to be one of the "key tests of fitness for salvation".

The Church describes human history as "God's six-thousand year management plan," divided in three stages: the Age of Law, when God as Jehovah guided Israel; the Age of Grace, when God as Jesus Christ saved humanity, but did not eradicate its sinful nature; and the Age of Kingdom, inaugurated in 1991, when God in his present incarnation as Almighty God reveals the fullness of truth and works to free humans from their sinfulness. Also, the group mentions a future Age of Millennial Kingdom, in which the earth will enter after the death of the present divine incarnation, and will be transformed into a kingdom of peace and joy.

According to Holly Folk, an associate professor at Western Washington University that has been studying the Church, it does not view the Bible as God's word but as a human work with flaws.

== Organization ==
According to sociologist Fenggang Yang, Eastern Lighting is organized hierarchically, with "inspectors" overseeing regional and subregional leaders, who in turn oversee the leaders of the local congregations. At the local and regional levels, leaders are elected by the members.

Members get together weekly (but not on a fixed day of the week) in what they call "fellowship meetings," in private homes in China and in "community houses," sometimes called "churches," abroad. There, they pray, read and discuss the revelations of Almighty God, sing hymns, hear sermons, and sometimes present artistic performances.

Starting in 2001, the group began efforts to proselytize online by creating websites which host church scripture in various languages, links to group chats, and news about online events. The group is also present on social media. Holly Folk, an associate professor at Western Washington University, said that "a lot of their international ministry functions as an internet religion".

Eastern Lightning's mode of expansion in China is to proselytize among independent Protestant congregations (commonly termed house churches), and many leaders among these Protestant communities have criticized Eastern Lightning and assisted the state's efforts to suppress the group.

Itself originally an offshoot of The Shouters, Eastern Lightning has developed offshoot groups itself.

== Repression in China ==
Eastern Lightning is banned in China and proselyting or organizing meetings on its behalf is a crime prosecuted under Article 300 of the Chinese Criminal Code. The United States Department of State in its Report on International Religious Freedom for the year 2018, published on June 21, 2019, reported claims that in 2018, Chinese "authorities arrested 11,111 of its [Eastern Lightning] members," and "subjected 525 of its members to 'torture or forced indoctrination,'" mentioning that some were "tortured to death while in custody". In its Report on International Religious Freedom for the year 2019, published on June 10, 2020, the same U.S. Department of State mentioned claims that in 2019, "at least 32,815 Church members were directly persecuted by authorities, compared with 23,567 in 2018," and "at least 19 Church members died as a result of abuse (20 in 2018)." The United States Commission on International Religious Freedom reported that "in 2018, the Chinese government harassed and arrested thousands of followers of [...] the Church of Almighty God. Many of those detained during the year [2018] suffered torture and other abuses, in some cases resulting in deaths or unexplained disappearances while in custody."

== Controversies ==
Eastern Lightning has been described by Chinese media as the nation's "most dangerous xie jiao". The group has been tied to, and accused of condoning and supporting, acts of violence.

=== 1998 Nanyang attacks ===
From October 30 to November 10, 1998, two alleged members of Eastern Lightning, Liu Shunting and Zhao Fating, committed a series of assaults and robberies across Tanghe and Sheqi Counties in Nanyang, Henan. Liu and Zhao, using knives, steel poles, and lime powder, beat, stabbed, blinded, and robbed 9 people over a 12-day period, reportedly for refusing to join or provide funds to the church. Of the 9 victims, 6 had their legs broken and 2 had their right ears cut off. On March 7, 2000, the Nanyang Intermediate People's Court sentenced Liu and Zhao to 18 years' imprisonment and 17 years' imprisonment, respectively, on charges of intentional injury and robbery.

=== 2002 mass kidnapping ===
In 2002, The Church of Almighty God was accused of staging a campaign of simultaneous kidnappings across multiple cities to capture thirty-four leaders of the China Gospel Fellowship (CGF).

Scholar Emily Dunn concluded in her 2015 book that rogue members of the sect, acting without the approval of the leaders, might have been responsible for the incident, writing that, "While Eastern Lightning's leadership evidently does not condone the use of violence, it may be unable to impress this upon some followers." Massimo Introvigne in his book published in 2020 suggested that China Gospel Fellowship members described as "kidnapping" what was in fact "deception," as they were invited, and went (voluntarily, according to Introvigne), to training sessions without being told that they were organized by Eastern Lightning.

=== 2012 doomsday riots ===
Some members of Eastern Lightning embraced the so-called Mayan prophecy and predicted the end of the world for 2012. The authorities accused them of causing riots and even crimes around China. According to Emily Dunn, the 2012 predictions were accepted by some members "without sanctions from [Eastern Lightning] authorities," who pointed out that in their theology there is no end of the world, and reprimanded and even expelled members who insisted in spreading the Mayan prophecy. Immediately prior to the supposed doomsday date of December 21, 2012, the Chinese government arrested 400 members of Eastern Lightning in central China, and as many as 1000 from other provinces of China. Chinese authorities also claimed that a certain Min Yongjun, who stabbed an elderly woman and 23 students at a school in Henan province, was motivated by the 2012 prophecies, and after the incident occurred pointed out that Eastern Lightning members were among those propagating these prophecies.

=== 2014 murder of Wu Shuoyan ===
Wu Shuoyan (1977–2014), a 37-year-old woman from Zhaoyuan, Shandong, who worked as a salesperson in a mall clothing store, was waiting after work to meet her husband and seven-year-old son in a nearby McDonald's. While Wu was there, a group of six persons (including a 12-year-old), entered the restaurant. They announced that they were "missionaries." After presenting their religious message, they demanded that customers supply their cell phone numbers for future contacts. Wu was twice asked to provide her phone number. She refused.

Wu was then beaten by two of the "missionaries", who used mops the group had brought with them. A chair was thrown at Wu, and her head and face were stomped. One attacker screamed "Go die! Evil spirit!" while another shouted at customers: "Whoever interferes will die!". The attack was captured on camera, with footage widely shared online. Wu died from her injuries at the scene.

The attackers were arrested and identified by the government as members of Eastern Lightning. Representatives from Eastern Lightning had publicly condemned the murder, claiming it had been committed by "psychopaths" who had nothing to do with them. In the wake of the murder, authorities in China engaged in widespread arrests of Eastern Lightning's members. The five adult attackers were found guilty at trial, with two of the murderers being executed for their role in 2015.

Covering the trial and the confessions of the accused assassins, reporters for the Chinese daily The Beijing News wrote that the perpetrators were in fact not members of Eastern Lightning at the time of the murder: they recognized as the living incarnation of God, rather than Yang Xiangbin, their own two female leaders, regarded as one divine soul in two bodies, and claimed that Eastern Lightning was a cult while theirs was a legitimate religious group. Some Western scholars who wrote about Eastern Lightning also concluded that the perpetrators at the time of the murder were members of a group different from Eastern Lightning. In 2017, Chinese authorities announced that two of the assassins had been successfully "re-educated" in jail. Although they maintained that theirs was a group based on the belief that the two female leaders of their movement, not Yang Xiangbin, were the real Almighty God, they also blamed books and Web sites of Eastern Lightning for having "ideologically corrupted" them in their youth.

=== 2019 Israeli election ===
In weeks before the 2019 Israeli election, as reported by BuzzFeed News, Twitter suspended dozens of Hebrew-language accounts run in The Church of Almighty God's name that were amplifying right-wing religious and political messages. The BuzzFeed article reported the opinion of Holly Folk, that the political activity was "outside the pattern of CAG's [Church of Almighty God's] typical behavior," and the accounts might have been created by Chinese agencies to discredit Eastern Lightning.

== See also ==
- Heterodox teachings (Chinese law)
- Christianity in China
- God complex
- Taiping Heavenly Kingdom
