= The Shouters =

Offshoot Chinese Christian sect

The Shouters, or more properly the Shouters sect (呼喊派), is a label attached by the People's Republic of China (PRC) to an amorphous group within China that was targeted by the government first as counterrevolutionaries and subsequently as a criminal cult after incidents in Dongyang and Yiwu counties in Zhejiang province in February 1982. "The Shouters sect" became the object of waves of arrests in 1983 and again in 1995. Several 1983 publications with ties to the Three-Self Patriotic Movement (TSPM) accused the late expatriate Chinese Christian teacher Witness Lee (Li Changshou) of being the leader of "the Shouters sect" and of instigating the disorders. In practice, however, the appellation "the Shouters sect" has been applied far more broadly to many groups that pray openly and audibly and/or do not register or otherwise cooperate with the TSPM. There is considerable reason to doubt the veracity of the reports which led to the condemnation of "the Shouters sect" and the association of them with Witness Lee or the local churches, and the local churches distance themselves from the Shouters.

== Background ==
During the Cultural Revolution of 1966–76, all public practice of religion in the People's Republic of China was suppressed as part of the attempt to eliminate the "Four Olds"—"old customs, old culture, old habits, and old ideas." Red Guard brigades assailed Christians in various parts of China. Religion was condemned as a corrupting factor in Chinese society, and many Christians were sent to labor camps and subjected to "re-education." Religious books, including Bibles and Christian literature, were destroyed. From 1973 the Christian faith began to spread rapidly in some parts of China. Because the TSPM had itself been disbanded in 1966, this spread took place entirely underground, that is, without government interference. Many "house churches" sprang up, as well as many home meetings associated with local churches organized along the lines of the teachings of Watchman Nee. However, in the absence of Bibles and other Christian literature, parts of China, especially more rural areas, became breeding grounds for the development of novel belief systems mixing elements of Christianity with Confucianism, Taoism, Buddhism, and local folk beliefs and practices.

Following the death of Mao Zedong and the defeat of the Gang of Four, Deng Xiaoping became the de facto leader of the Chinese Communist Party (CCP) and of the government of the PRC. In 1978 the Fifth National People's Congress of the People's Republic of China adopted a new constitution, the third in the history of the PRC. As far back as the 1954 constitution, Article 88 guaranteed that "Citizens of the People's Republic of China enjoy freedom of religious belief." Nevertheless, after the excesses of the Cultural Revolution, the affirmation in Article 46 of the new constitution that "citizens enjoy freedom to believe in religion and freedom not to believe in religion and to propagate atheism" led many to believe that a new era of religious freedom was dawning. (Note: This freedom had been a part of Article 88 of the first constitution of the PRC, adopted in 1954.) However, the PRC has historically regulated the practice of religion.

=== The TSPM and the PRC's regulation of religion ===
In 1950 Zhou Enlai worked with Y. T. Wu to craft "The Christian Manifesto" declaring that Protestants in China would support the new government and reject foreign imperialism. Such initiatives led to the establishment of the TSPM which promoted the "three-self principles" of self-government, self-support, and self-propagation. Shortly afterwards a widespread accusation/denouncement campaign began which led to the expulsion of foreign missionaries and to the arrest and imprisonment of many indigenous Chinese Christians as counterrevolutionaries, including prominent Christian teachers such as Watchman Nee and Wang Mingdao. The CCP had a deep mistrust of any leader or movement with a significant following, including religious ones, partly due to the prominent place of the religiously motivated Taiping Rebellion in China's relatively recent past. The CCP itself had first gained traction in China by mobilizing small groups of peasants in rural areas and had grown in strength until it was able to topple the Kuomintang from power.

The TSPM was disbanded in 1966, near the outset of the Cultural Revolution. When the TSPM was reinstituted in 1979, its influence was initially confined to major metropolitan areas such as Beijing and Shanghai, whereas the rapid proliferation of the Christian faith was in provinces such as Henan, Zhejiang, Fujian, and Anhui. Many Christians in China viewed the TSPM with suspicion because in its earlier incarnation in the 1950s, the TSPM had promoted modernist theology and had collaborated with the CCP to repress and persecute more biblical teachers. These Christians saw the reestablishment of the TSPM in 1979 as the government's attempt to reassert control over them and to slow the spread of the Christian gospel.

== Development ==
In 1962, Witness Lee (an acolyte of Watchman Nee) moved from Taiwan to the United States and founded Living Stream Ministry. Witness Lee sought to expand the Local Church movement internationally.

In the late 1970s, teachings and practices advocated by Witness Lee and his followers entered China. These practices included congregation members exclaiming "Lord!" "Amen!" and "Halleluiah!" during services. Critics of these congregations began describing them as "The Shouters", intending the term with a negative connotation. The Chinese government and the Three-Self churches are among these critics.

Over time, the Shouters developed offshoot or splinter groups, such as Established King and Eastern Lightning.

== Dongyang/Yiwu incidents ==
In February 1982 conflicts broke out between Christians in Dongyang and Yiwu counties in Zhejiang province and representatives of the TSPM and the Public Security Bureau. The first report of these events outside of China appeared in a magazine called The Lord in China. In its inaugural issue it printed the full text of a mimeographed prayer letter dated April 3, 1982, which had circulated in central and south China after the incident at Dongyang. It stated that on February 14–16, two representatives of the TSPM had visited Dongyang to set up a TSPM chapter there. However, thousands of Christians of multiple affiliations did not agree and held a three-day open air prayer meeting in front of the place where the TSPM representatives were conducting meetings. Then on February 28 TSPM representatives instigated a group of commune members to conduct a surprise raid on one of the Christian meeting places in Dongyang. Some of the Christians were beaten or had lime thrown in their eyes. According to the circular letter, a similar raid occurred in Yiwu county, the main difference being that TSPM personnel instructed Public Security Bureau members to disrupt a meeting, which they did, using electric batons.

This report was also picked up by the Chinese Church Research Centre (CCRC), a Christian China watching organization based in Hong Kong. Part of the circular prayer letter was translated and printed in the June 1982 issue of the China Prayer Letter. The prayer letter was also mentioned in the June 1982 issue of The People, a Chinese magazine also based in Hong Kong. The CCRC reprinted the circular letter in the July/August 1982 issue of China and the Church Today. The July 1982 issue of CCRC News reported that

Due to their unyielding resistance, the church at Dongyang, Zhejiang, has gone through severe persecution at the hands of the TSPM and the United Front Department. They are told that if they refuse to join the TSPM they are unpatriotic, and that to hold a meeting without approval is to engage in unlawful gatherings. The covering of their heads is a sign of anti-revolution; and the calling of the Lord's name is a reactionary slogan.

Meanwhile, another group representing various mainline Christian constituencies, the Ecumenical China Study Liaison Group (ECSLG), had been pursuing a policy of rapprochement and collaboration with the TSPM. The group included the Tao Fong Shan Ecumenical Centre, Hong Kong Christian Council, Lutheran World Federation, China Study Project (Anglican), and Pro Mundi Vita (Roman Catholic), among others. Participants included Philip Wickeri, Edmond Tang, Arne Sovik, and Bob Whyte. The members of this group published several periodicals, including Bridge, Religion in the People's Republic of China, and Ching Feng, which reprinted TSPM documents and statements and generally followed an editorial policy sympathetic to the TSPM's viewpoint.

After news of the incidents and the ensuing repression spread, representatives of some ECSLG member organizations traveled into China and met with TSPM officials. Among the visitors were Cheung Hui Kwan (張喣羣) of the Hong Kong Christian Council and Lin Ru-Sheng (林汝升) of the Hong Kong-based periodical Ching Feng (景風). Upon their return Lin Ru-Sheng contributed an article to the September 1982 issue of Ching Feng, published by the Christian Study Centre on Chinese Religion and Culture of the Tao Fong Shan Ecumenical Centre. This was the first publication outside of China to use the derogatory term "the Shouters sect," which the TSPM had created, and also the first to present an alternative history blaming Witness Lee and "the Shouters sect" for the civil disturbances at Dongyang and Yiwu. (Lin Ru-sheng's article wrongly stated that Witness Lee, who never returned to China after his departure in 1949, had personally visited China in 1980.) Cheung Hui Kwan and Mok Shu-en (莫樹恩), executives of the Hong Kong Christian Council, co-wrote an article titled "Another Side of the Dongyang/Yiwu Incident" that was published in both the October 1982 issue of Xinxi (信息) and the November 1982 issue of The Seventies (七十年代). The Seventies article was subtitled "Heresy Spreading over Mainland China." This article echoed Lin Ru-Sheng's Ching Feng article.

These reports transmuted the depiction of the believers who practiced calling on the name of the Lord from being law-abiding citizens to being a dangerous sect that was violently anti-government. Such a characterization seems to have been without justification. In any case, both disturbing civil order and participating in anti-government activities are contrary to the ministry of both Watchman Nee and Witness Lee. Witness Lee's speaking about calling on the Lord never sanctioned the type of disorderly behavior attributed to "the Shouters sect," and the more extreme characterizations of Watchman Nee and Witness Lee as counterrevolutionary are contradicted by statements of both men that the church should have no participation in politics and Christians should submit to whatever government rules their country.

In response to the revisionist reports, Tony Lambert, a former British diplomat to China who joined the Overseas Missionary Fellowship (formerly the China Inland Mission), translated a paper titled "The Lord in China: The Dongyang Yiwu Persecution: Another View." The paper said, "In reality, we have sufficient evidence to show that the persecuted underground church at Dongyang & Yiwu does not belong to the ‘Local Church’ of Li Changshou or to the ‘screamers sect’." This account was repeated and confirmed by the CCRC in Don't Forget About China in December 1982 and in the January/February issue of China and the Church.

In the ensuing months conflicting accounts went back and forth. The February 1983 issue of Tian Feng, the official TSPM magazine, contained an article by Deng Fucun, one of the TSPM participants involved in seeking to expand TSPM influence in Zhejiang, called "The Truth of the ‘Dongyang-Yiwu’ Incident." This article blamed "the Shouters sect." Most contemporaneous accounts from overseas took the opposite view. "A letter to all the members of the Lord's Body (from the saints in Dongyang)" was published in the April 10, 1983, issue of The Gospel. It said that the TSPM "persecuted many believers who did not side with them, by creating conflicts, fabricating facts, and putting the labels ‘heretical and cultic group’, ‘unpatriotic’, and ‘counterrevolutionary’. They cracked down on the believers on these unfounded charges of political crimes." Thus, the term "the Shouters sect" was broadened to include many who did not register with TSPM.

Most recent Western sources follow the version of events reported by the members of the Ecumenical China Study Liaison Group, which echoed the TSPM's portrayal of "the Shouters sect" as a cultic offshoot of the local churches. This may be due, in part, to the book-length treatments of the history of the church in China written by former Ecumenical China Study Liaison Group participants Bob Whyte, Edmond Tang, and Philip Wickeri. However, Tony Lambert later reported that TSPM Chairman Ding Guangxun, who had initially blamed "the Shouters sect" for inciting the unrest, admitted in 1987 that "local TSPM strong-arm tactics had been responsible for the incidents" at Dongyang and Yiwu.

== Suppression of "the Shouters" (1983–1984) ==
The Chinese government and the Three-Self churches contended that the Shouters were creating civil disturbances, disrupting Three-Self church activities and organizing protests against the government.

Jiang Ping, Vice Minister of the United Front Work Department (UFWD) of the CPC Central Committee, was assigned to form a team to investigate the problem of "the Shouters sect." The team was composed of members of the Public Security Bureau, the Religious Affairs Bureau (now the State Administration for Religious Affairs), and the Ethnic Groups Affairs Bureau. Its first stop was in Shanghai on January 15, 1983, where they met with Tang Shou-lin and Ren Zhong-xiang.

After all of Watchman Nee's close co-workers were arrested on January 29, 1956, Tang and Ren were elected as elders, not by the congregation of the church in Shanghai, but by the "Believers’ Political Re-education Committee," which had been formed to oversee the political indoctrination of the church's members. Tang and Ren cooperated in the PRC's campaign to denounce Watchman Nee as a counterrevolutionary. Tang had earlier been a member of the Three-Self Standing Committee but withdrew from this position due to criticism by church members that he had betrayed the church in Shanghai. After his cooperation in denouncing Watchman Nee, Tang was reinstated and made a TSPM Vice Chairman. Under the leadership of Tang and Ren the Nanyang Road meeting hall built under Watchman Nee's oversight for the church in Shanghai was given to the TSPM in 1958 and any semblance of the church in Shanghai's meetings ceased. After undergoing re-education in a reform-through-labor (laogai) camp during the Cultural Revolution, Tang was reinstated as a Vice Chairman in the newly re-established TSPM and made a member of the standing committee of the China Christian Council, which was established by the TSPM in 1980. In July 1981 Tang issued a statement titled "Pouring Out My Heart to the Party," in which he said, "I made a decision: anything that was expedient to the Party and our country, as long as I could do it, I would do it and would do it well."

When Tang and Ren met with the PRC officials in January 1983, they shared a common interest in suppressing those in the local churches who were aggressively spreading the gospel in China. The CCP viewed any widespread social movement as a political threat, and the TSPM saw any activity outside of its purview as undermining the legitimacy of its claim to be the sole representative of the Christian faith in China. On January 16, a TSPM panel, including Tang and Ren, decided that "the Shouters sect" was counterrevolutionary in politics and heretical in religion and should be dealt with swiftly. Tang and Ren were commissioned to write a refutation of "the Shouters sect."

In April 1983 a forty-page book by Tang and Ren titled Firmly Resist the Heretical Opinions of Li Changshou [Witness Lee] was published by the Nanjing Union Theological Seminary as teaching material. Copies were sent to Public Security Bureau offices throughout China, as well as to state-approved churches and other Christian organizations. Many of the accusations in Tang and Ren's book were based on The God-Men, a book which was published in the United States by the Spiritual Counterfeits Project and was sent to Tang. The God-Men was subsequently ruled to be false and libelous in 1985. The entire text of Tang and Ren's book was reproduced in the September 1983 issue of Ching Feng, a publication of the Tao Fong Shan Christian Centre in Hong Kong. An interview with Tang and Ren was published by Tao Fong Shan in the November 1983 issue of its Bridge magazine. This article included a picture of the cover of The God-Men on its second page. A second, expanded edition of Tang and Ren's book specifically cited The God-Men as a source.

Following the publication of the first edition of Tang and Ren's book, a nationwide campaign to suppress "the Shouters sect" and to attack the teaching of Witness Lee was initiated. TSPM seminars were held throughout the country to denounce Witness Lee and the "Shouters sect." The July and September issues of Tian Feng published several articles echoing Tang and Ren's accusations.

The Dongyang/Yiwu incidents had occurred against a backdrop of widespread civil unrest in the PRC. Crime had become a serious problem, something of a residue of the Cultural Revolution. The economic reforms implemented by Deng Xiaoping reduced duplication of workers, resulting in a substantial number of workers being displaced. When an Anti-Crime Campaign began in August 1983, the wave of persecutions that had already begun after the Dongyang/Yiwu incidents was quickly subsumed under it. Government entities at various levels issued proclamations outlawing "the Shouters sect" as a criminal cult. Leaders of the local churches using publications of Witness Lee were targeted for arrest, but many unregistered house church leaders were also incarcerated. Several sources have noted that "the Shouters sect" was applied broadly to any Christian group which refused to join TSPM. Jonathan Chao of the CCRC speculated that Tang and Ren's book "may be TSPM's way of isolating Li's group from other Christians, and it will probably be effective since evangelical house church leaders in China will not support Li against the TSPM."

After news of the persecution against "the Shouters" reached the United States, members of the U. S. Congress took note. On November 17, 1983, U. S. House of Representatives members Don Sundquist, Mark D. Siljander, Christopher H. Smith, and Thomas J. Tauke wrote to Zhang Wenjin, the PRC ambassador to the U.S. expressing concern for two Christians scheduled to be executed the following month and asking for information on the imprisonment of "Shouters." On November 23 Senator Mark Hatfield also wrote to Zhang, echoing the concerns in the Representatives’ letter. On December 7 Zhang responded that the Chinese government was engaged in a crackdown on crime in order to maintain social stability and that the arrests were not because of religious beliefs but because of criminal activities. In May 1984, concurrent resolutions were introduced in both houses of the U. S. Congress expressing America's continuing concern for religious freedom and strongly urging the PRC to release several imprisoned Roman Catholic priests and Protestant pastors and lay workers.

== Continued repression ==
"The Shouters sect" has been a target of repression in China since that time. In March 1995, the CCP reaffirmed its determination to exterminate "evil cults" (Chinese: 邪教; pinyin: xiéjiào). A circular titled "Notice by the Ministry of Public Security Concerning the Banning of the ‘Shouter Sect’ and Other Cult Organizations and Opinions on their Situation and Operations" was endorsed by the State Council and CCP Central Committee in November 1995. This led to a new wave of persecution against "the Shouters sect." In 1998 house church leaders in Henan province issued a statement calling on the government "to release unconditionally all House Church Christians presently serving in Labor Reform Camps." This appeal also noted that the "Local Church" had been incorrectly labeled the "Shouters’ Sect." Author David Aikman reported that no "Local Church" representatives were involved in drafting or issuing this statement.

In the Christian Research Institute's reversal of earlier criticisms of the local churches, Christian Research Journal Editor-in-Chief Elliot Miller summarized the confusion as to the identity of "the Shouters" and their relationship to the local churches as follows:

The epithet Shouters was introduced in the early 1980s by the Three Self Patriotic Movement in Jeijing Province to suppress LC activity (as they sought to do with all Christian groups who refused to join their movement). Over time the name Shouters has morphed in its usage by many Chinese to refer to all members of unregistered house churches, while still others use it to identify a small renegade group of people who claim to be followers of Witness Lee but have broken fellowship with the LC and distort the Bible and Lee's teachings in numerous cultic ways. The misidentification of the LC with this latter group of "Shouters" has plagued the LC in its dealings with the authorities.

Nevertheless, on September 9, 1999, the U. S. Department of State issued a report in which it was stated that the PRC was continuing efforts to "close down an underground evangelical group called ‘the Shouters’" and commenting that "since the early 1980s, authorities repeatedly have detained, fined, or imprisoned its members." On October 30, 1999, the Standing Committee of the National People's Congress adopted a legislative resolution banning cult organizations and establishing policies for punishing cult activities. A 2006 Department of State report said, "The Government continued its repression of groups that it categorized as ‘cults’ in general and of small Christian-based groups... in particular." A 2011 Department of State report notes that the PRC still lists "the Shouters" as an "evil cult" (Chinese: 邪教; pinyin: xiéjiào) and notes that "there are no public criteria for determining, or procedures for challenging, such a designation."

== Other responses ==
Mainstream Protestant groups in China and internationally typically deem the Shouters as heretical.

== See also ==
- Chinese Independent Churches
- Christianity in China
- House church (China)
- Brethren (religious group)

== Bibliography ==
- Lyall, Leslie (1985), God Reigns in China, London: Hodder & Stoughton.
- Zhang, Xikang [張錫康] (2012), 張錫康回憶錄 [The Memoirs of Zhang Xikang], Hong Kong: Guang Rong Press.
