= Protestant missions in China =

Christian missions in China

China Inland Mission missionaries in native dress

In the early 19th century, Western colonial expansion occurred at the same time as an evangelical revival – the Second Great Awakening – throughout the English-speaking world, leading to more overseas missionary activity. The nineteenth century became known as the Great Century of modern religious missions.

Beginning with the English missionary Robert Morrison in 1807, thousands of Protestant men, their wives and children, and unmarried female missionaries would live and work in China in an extended encounter between Chinese and Western culture. Most missionaries represented and were supported by Protestant organizations or denominations in their home countries. They entered China at a time of growing power by the British East India Company, but were initially restricted from living and traveling in China except for the limited area of the Thirteen Factories in Canton, now known as Guangzhou, and Macau. In the 1842 treaty ending the First Opium War missionaries were granted the right to live and work in five coastal cities. In 1860, the treaties ending the Second Opium War with the French and British opened up the entire country to missionary activity.

Protestant missionary activity exploded during the next few decades. From 50 missionaries in China in 1860, the number grew to 2,500 (counting spouses and children) in 1900. 1,400 of the missionaries were British, 1,000 were Americans, and 100 were from continental Europe, mostly Scandinavia. Protestant missionary activity peaked in the 1920s and thereafter declined due to war and unrest in China. By 1953, all Protestant missionaries had been expelled by the communist government of China. It is difficult to determine an exact number, but historian Kathleen Lodwick estimates that some 50,000 foreigners served in mission work in China between 1807 and 1949, including both Protestants and Catholics.

== Missionary activity (1807–1842) ==
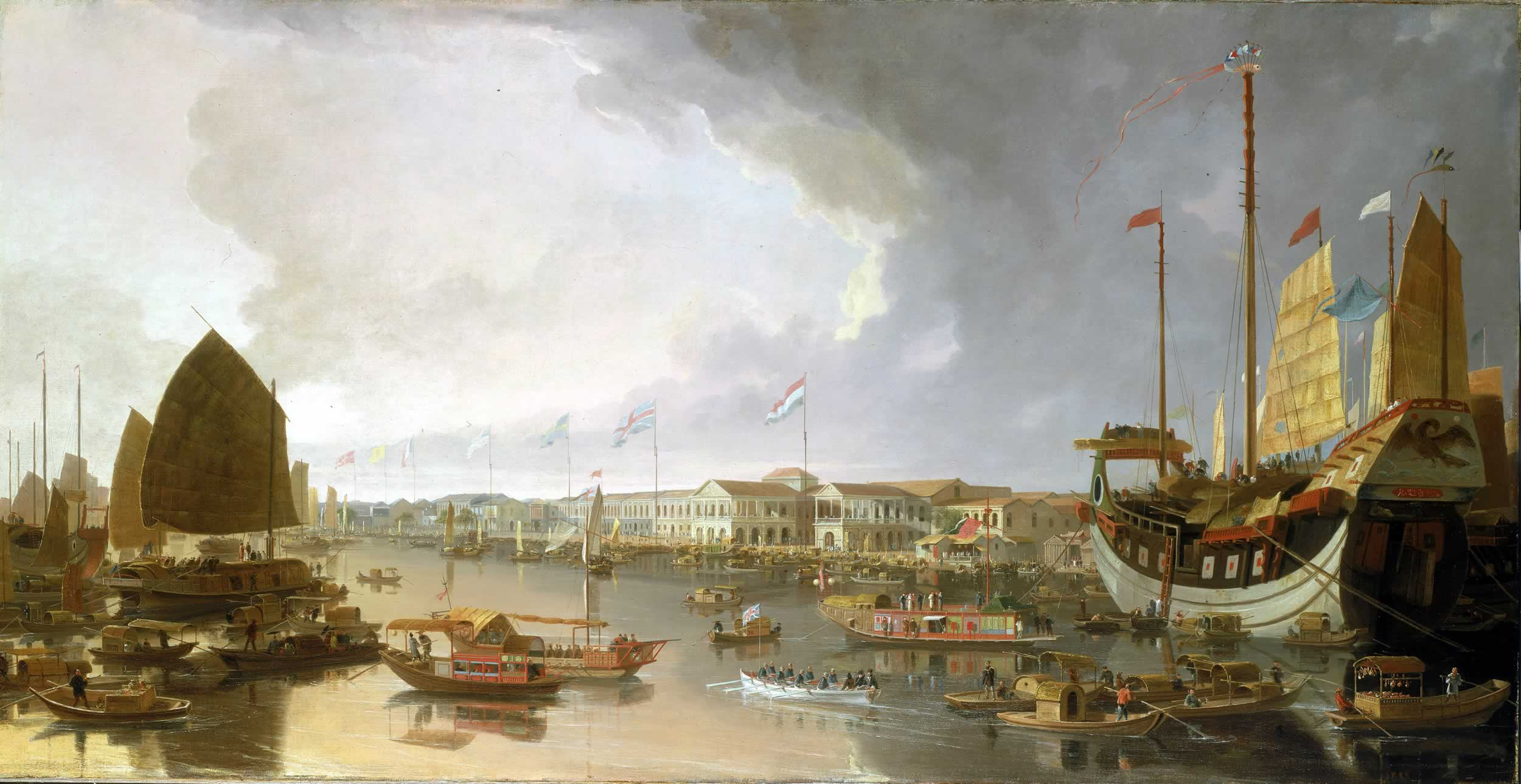
William Daniell's c. 1805 View of the Canton Factories: Until 1842, foreigners "from the Southern Sea" were required to live in Macao or the ships of the Pazhou ("Whampoa") anchorage; even bonded traders were restricted to the Thirteen Factories trading ghetto in Guangzhou (then romanized as "Canton"). Travel outside these areas was forbidden. Foreign women were permitted only on Macao.

For Robert Morrison and the first missionaries who followed him, life in China consisted of being confined to Portuguese Macao and the Thirteen Factories trading ghetto in Guangzhou (then known as "Canton") with only the reluctant support of the East India Company and confronting opposition from the Chinese government and from the Jesuits who had been established in China for more than a century. Morrison's early work mostly consisted of learning Classical Chinese, Cantonese, and Nanjing Mandarin; compiling a bidirectional dictionary based on the 1714 Kangxi Dictionary; and translating the Bible. He was forced to take work with the East India Company in order to fund these activities and remain at Guangzhou. In such conditions, his proselytizing was limited to his employees, whom he compelled to attend Sunday services and daily meetings including prayer, Scriptural readings, and the singing of hymns. It took years before Cai Gao was interested in baptism. Nonetheless, as Morrison's first converts—Cai Gao, Liang Fa, Qu Ya'ang—were literate men who also became the first Chinese trained in western printing and lithography, they began to express his message in more effective terms and to print hundreds, then thousands, of tracts.

Though Morrison and his fellows largely escaped punishment, his converts were much less lucky. Morrison's earliest efforts—even before his first convert—saw Christianity added (in 1812) to the list of banned religions under the Qing Empire's statue against "Wizards, Witches, and All Superstitions". Existing statutes against Chinese travel abroad (as to the London Missionary Society's station at Malacca) and against teaching foreigners to speak or read the Chinese language provided additional avenues for persecution. Upon his first attempt to print tracts for his village kinsmen, Liang Fa was arrested, beaten on the soles of his feet with bamboo, and released only to pay a massive fine which Morrison on principle refused to help him with; instead, he used the savings he had laid aside for new houses for his wife and father. On the occasion, Morrison sanguinely noted that the conversion of China may well require many such martyrs.

In 1826, the Daoguang Emperor revised the law against superstitions to provide for sentencing Europeans to death for spreading Christianity among Han Chinese and Manchus ("Tartars"). Christian converts who would not repent their conversion were to be sent to Muslim cities in Xinjiang and given as slaves to Muslim leaders and beys.

People of the Western Ocean [Europeans], should they propagate in the country the religion of Heaven's Lord, [name given to Christianity by the Catholics] or clandestinely print books, or collect congregations to be preached to, and thereby deceive many people, or should any Tartars or Chinese, in their turn, propagate the doctrines and clandestinely give names (as in baptism), inflaming and misleading many, if proved by authentic testimony, the head or leader shall be sentenced to immediate death by strangulation: he who propagates the religion, inflaming and deceiving the people, if the number be not large, and no names be given, shall be sentenced to strangulation after a period of imprisonment. Those who are merely hearers or followers of the doctrine, if they will not repent and recant, shall be transported to the Mohammedan cities (in Turkistan) and given to be slaves to the beys and other powerful Mohammedans who are able to coerce them. ... All civil and military officers who may fail to detect Europeans clandestinely residing in the country within their jurisdiction, and propagating their religion, thereby deceiving the multitude, shall be delivered over to the Supreme Board and be subjected to a court of inquiry.

The first American missionary to China, Elijah Coleman Bridgman arrived in Guangzhou in 1830. He established a printing press for Christian literature. The first medical missionary to China was American Peter Parker who arrived in Guangzhou in 1835. He established a hospital which gained support from the Chinese, treating thousands of patients.

Following the appeal of Karl Gützlaff, who started work in China in 1831, German, Scandinavian, and American Lutheran mission societies followed with Lutheran missions to China.

== Expanding missionary influence (1842–1900) ==
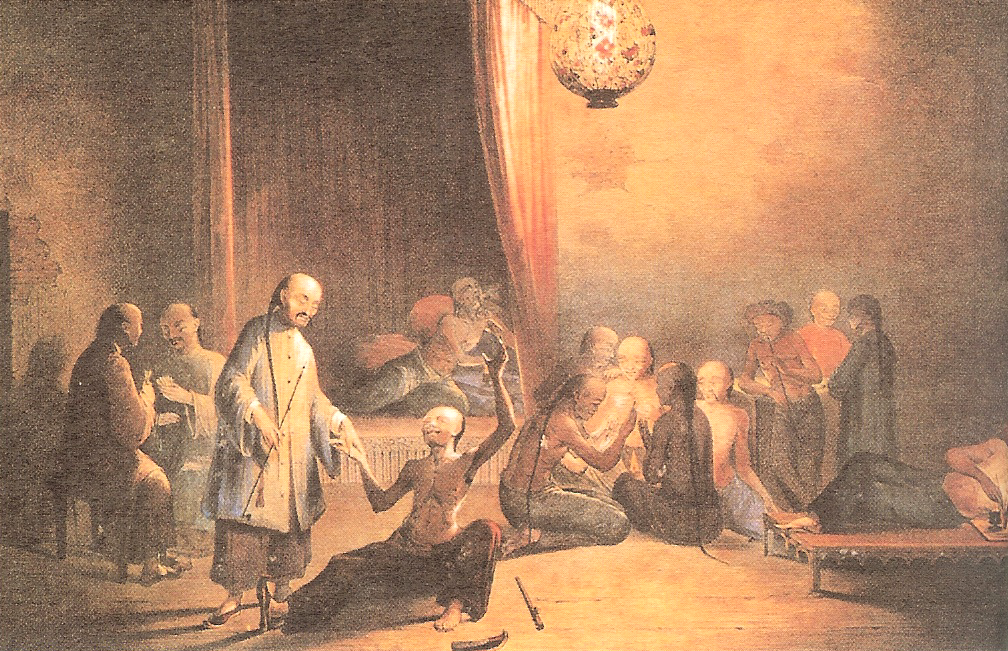
An opium den in 18th-century China through the eyes of a Western artist

The defeat of China by Great Britain in the First Opium War resulted in the Treaty of Nanjing in 1842 which opened to trade, residence by foreigners, and missionary activity five Chinese port cities: Guangzhou ("Canton"), Xiamen ("Amoy"), Fuzhou ("Foochow"), Ningbo ("Ningpo"), and Shanghai. Protestant missionary organizations established themselves in the open cities.

In the Second Opium War (1856–1860) Great Britain and France defeated China. The Convention of Peking in 1860 opened up the entire country to travel by foreigners and provided for freedom of religion in China. Protestant missionary activity increased quickly after this treaty and within two decades missionaries were present in nearly every major city and province of China.

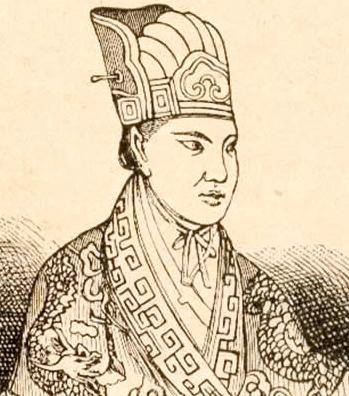
Hong Xiuquan

Protestant missionaries were indirectly responsible for the Taiping Rebellion, which convulsed southern and central China from 1850 to 1864. Experiencing a severe mental disturbance after a series of failed imperial examinations, the scholar Hong Xiuquan had a dream which he interpreted in light of the 500-page Liang Fa tract given to him years before. (Liang and other Protestants targeted Guangdong's prefectural and provincial examinations as massive gatherings of literate, potentially influential young men.) Forbidden baptism by the American Baptist Issachar Jacox Roberts, Hong grew more heterodox. Although he used the Protestant Bible and tracts as his movement's holy books and attached great importance to his version of the Ten Commandments, he preached his own form of Christianity, including the belief that he was Jesus's younger brother. Roberts became an advisor to the Taipings but fell out with them in 1862, fleeing for his life and denounced them.

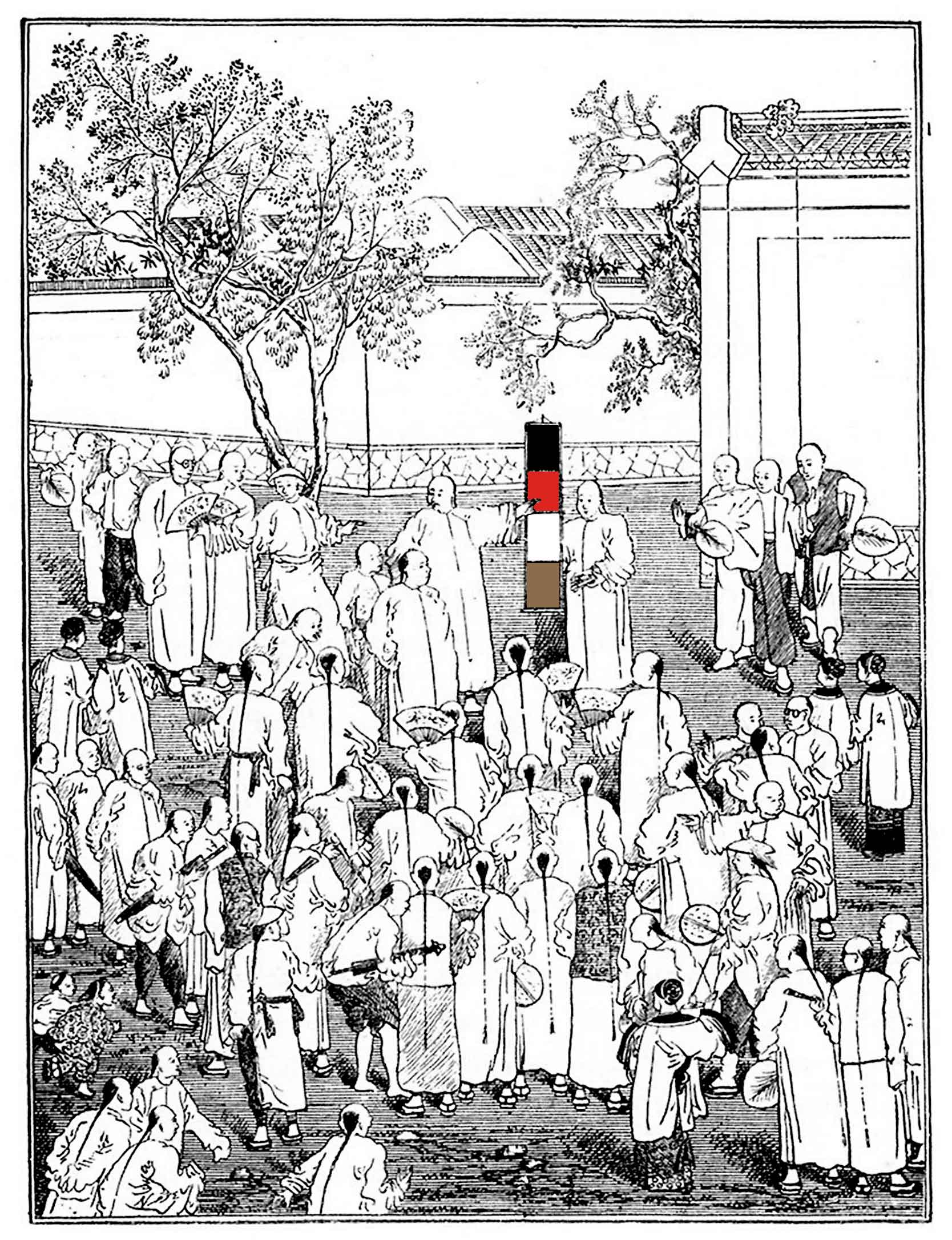
Missionary preaching in China using The Wordless Book

The 1859 Awakening in Britain and the work of J. Hudson Taylor (1832–1905) helped increase the number of missionaries in China. By 1865 when Taylor created the China Inland Mission (CIM) there were 30 different Protestant groups at work in China. But in the seven provinces in which Protestant missionaries were working, there were an estimated 204 million people with only 91 workers. Eleven other provinces with a population estimated at 197 million, had no missionaries. Taylor and others aroused the West put more people and resources into the effort make China a Christian country. Missionary societies and denominations on both sides of the Atlantic responded. Many new societies were formed and hundreds of missionaries were recruited, many from university students influenced by the ministry of D. L. Moody. The most prominent of the missionary organisations were the CIM and the London Missionary Society, and the American Board of Commissioners for Foreign Missions. Other missionaries were affiliated with Baptists, Southern Baptists, Presbyterians, American Reformed Mission, Methodists, Episcopalians, and Wesleyans.

The Protestant missionary movement distributed numerous copies of the Bible, as well as other printed works of history and science. They established and developed schools and hospitals practicing Western medicine. Traditional Chinese teachers viewed the mission schools with suspicion and it was often difficult for the Christian schools to attract pupils. The schools offered basic education to poor Chinese, both boys and girls. Before the time of the Chinese Republic, they would have otherwise received no formal schooling.

Influential Protestant missionaries arriving in China in the nineteenth century included the Americans William Ament, Justus Doolittle, Chester Holcombe, Henry W. Luce, William Alexander Parsons Martin, Calvin Wilson Mateer, Lottie Moon, John Livingstone Nevius, and Arthur Henderson Smith. Prominent British missionaries included James Legge, Walter Henry Medhurst, Fred Charles Roberts, and William Edward Soothill. Prominent among the China missionaries were idealistic and well-educated young men and women who were members of the Oberlin Band, the Cambridge Seven, and the Student Volunteer Movement.

The slogan of the missionary movement was "The evangelization of the world". Later, to give urgency, the slogan was expanded to be: "The evangelization of the world in this generation". China, resistant to missionary efforts and the most populous country in the world, received a large share of the attention of the burgeoning worldwide missionary movement.

== Missionary life in China ==
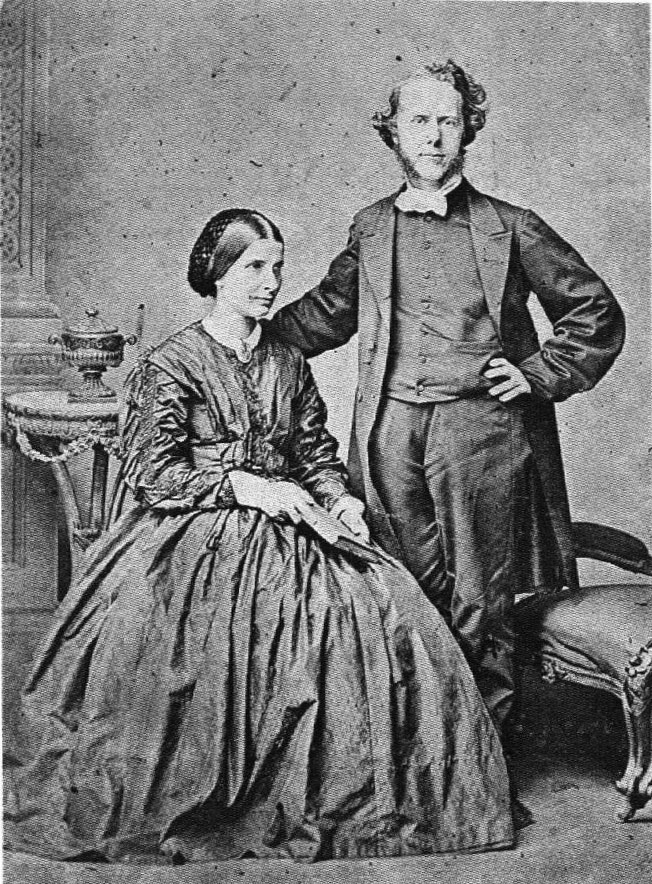
Hudson and Maria Taylor in 1865

The China missionary lived an arduous life, especially in the 19th century. Attrition was high because of health problems and mental breakdowns. Learning the Chinese language was a long-term and difficult endeavor. A majority of missionaries proved to be ineffective. "Of the first fifty-three missionaries sent out....by the China Inland Mission, only twenty-two adults remained in the mission, and of these only four or five men and three or four women were much good. It took about five years of language study and work for a missionary to function in China—and many fledgling missionaries resigned or died before completing their tutelage. Overall, in the 19th century, although missionaries arriving in China were usually young and healthy, about one-half of missionaries resigned or died after less than 10 years of service. Health reasons were the principal reason for resignation. Mortality among children born to missionary couples was estimated to be three times that of infant mortality in rural England. In the late 19th century, health and living conditions began to improve as missionary organizations became more knowledgeable and the number of missionary doctors increased.

A blow to the morale of China missionaries was their low rate of success in the achievement of their primary objective: the conversion of Chinese to Christianity. Robert Morrison in 27 years of missionary effort could only report 25 converts and other early missionaries had similar experiences. The pace of conversions picked up with time but by 1900 there were still only 100,000 Chinese Protestant Christians after nearly a century of endeavor by thousands of missionaries. Moreover, critics charged that many of the Chinese were "Rice Christians", accepting Christianity only for the material benefits of becoming a Christian. Missionaries turned towards establishing hospitals and schools as more effective in attracting Chinese to Christianity than proselytizing.

In Chinese eyes, Christianity was associated with opium, the Taiping Rebellion with its millions of dead, imperialism, and the special privileges granted foreigners and Christian converts under the Unequal Treaties. A Chinese nobleman said of the European and American presence in China: "Take away your missionaries and your opium and you will be welcome."

Xinjiang was proselytized by Swedish missionaries to preach and convert Uyghurs (Turki Muslims).

Christian missionaries such as British missionary George W. Hunter, Johannes Avetaranian, and Swedish missionaries like Magnus Bäcklund, Nils Fredrik Höijer, Father Hendricks, Josef Mässrur, Anna Mässrur, Albert Andersson, Gustaf Ahlbert, Stina Mårtensson, John Törnquist, Gösta Raquette, Oskar Hermannson and the Uyghur converted Christian Nur Luke studied the Uyghur language and wrote works on it. A Turkish convert to Christianity, Johannes Avetaranian went to China to spread Christianity to the Uyghurs. Yaqup Istipan, Wu'erkaixi, and Alimujiang Yimiti are other Uyghurs who converted to Christianity.

The Bible was translated into the Kashgari dialect of Turki (Uyghur).

An anti-Christian mobs was broke out among the Muslims in Kashgar directed against the Swedish missionaries in 1923.

In the name of Islam, the Uyghur leader Abdullah Bughra violently physically assaulted the Yarkand-based Swedish missionaries and would have executed them except they were only banished due to the British Aqsaqal's intercession in their favor.

George W. Hunter noted that while Tungan Muslims (Chinese Muslims) would almost never prostitute their daughters, Turki Muslims (Uyghurs) would prostitute their daughters, which was why Turki prostitutes were common around the country.

Swedish Christian missionary J. E. Lundahl wrote in 1917 that the local Muslim women in Xinjiang married Chinese men because of a lack of Chinese women, the relatives of the woman and other Muslims reviled the women for their marriages.

—A number of British and German friends are subscribing to support a new mission with headquarters in Kashgar and Yarkand, two cities of Chinese Turkestan, and the work is to be carried on not among the Chinese, but among the Mohammedans, who are in a large majority in that district. The new mission is interesting, in that it is an attack upon China from the west. Two German missionaries, accompanied by a doctor and a native Christian, will arive [sic] in Kashgar next spring and begin work. It may be added that the British and Foreign Bible Society is at present printing the four Gospels in the dialect of Chinese Turkestan, and that in all probability they will be ready before the new mission is settled at Kashgar.

== Women missionaries ==
Missionary societies initially sent out only married couples and a few single men as missionaries. Wives served as unpaid "assistant missionaries". The opinion of male-dominated missionary societies was that unmarried women should not live unprotected and alone in a foreign country and that the spiritual work of missionaries could only be undertaken by ordained men. Over time, as it became clear that Christian schools were necessary to attract and educate potential Christians and leaders and change foreign cultures that were unreceptive to the Christian message as proclaimed by male missionary preachers. The first unmarried female missionary in China was Mary Ann Aldersey, an eccentric British woman, who opened a school for girls in Ningpo in 1844.

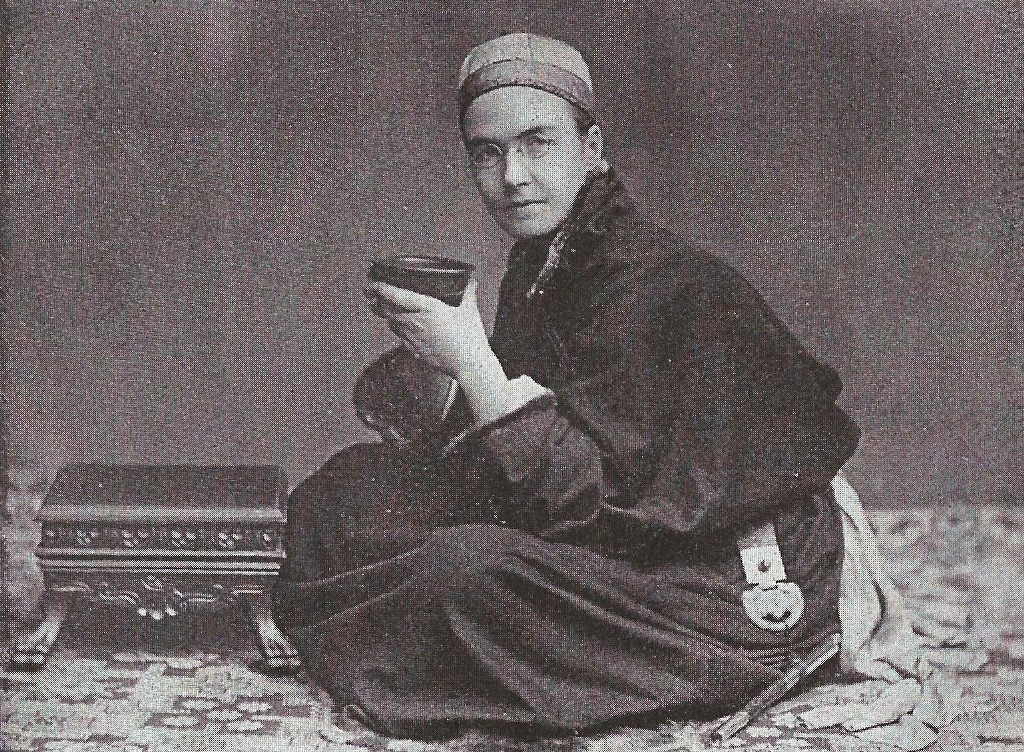
Susie Carson Rijnhart was a missionary, a medical doctor, and an explorer of Tibet.

In the 1860s women's missionary organizations, especially the Woman's Foreign Missionary Society of the Methodist Episcopal Church in the United States and women began to become missionaries around the world in sizable numbers. Women missionaries, married and unmarried, would soon outnumber men. By 1919, American Methodist and Congregationalist (ABCFM) women missionaries numbered more than twice the number of male missionaries in China. The rise of female missionaries to prominence was not without friction with men. An 1888 Baptist conference affirmed that "women's work in the foreign field must be careful to recognize the headship of men" and "the head of woman is the man."

In China, due to cultural norms, male missionaries could not interact with Chinese women and thus the evangelical work among women was the responsibility of missionary women. Female missionary doctors treated Chinese women and female missionaries managed girl's schools. Women missionaries were customarily paid less than men. The Methodists in the 1850s paid a male missionary to China a salary of 500 dollars per year, but the first two unmarried female missionaries the Methodists sent to China, Beulah and Sarah Woolston, received an annual salary of only 300 dollars each. The early unmarried female missionaries were required to live with missionary families. Later, unmarried women missionaries often shared a home. Despite their preponderance in numbers, female missionaries, married and unmarried, were often excluded from participation in policy decisions within missionary organizations which were usually dominated by men. Only in the 1920s, for example, were women given a full voice and vote in the missionary meetings in China of the American Board.

Women missionaries had a "civilizing mission" of introducing Protestant middle-class culture to China, educating Chinese women and "elevating their gender". They played a major role in campaigns against opium and foot binding. The widespread view in Europe and America in the late 19th century was that "Civilization cannot exist apart from Christianity."

Nineteenth-century women missionaries to China included two early explorers of Tibet, Englishwoman Annie Royle Taylor and Canadian Susanna Carson Rijnhart, both of whom undertook much more dangerous expeditions than famous explorers of the day such as Sven Hedin and Aurel Stein.

== Boxer Rebellion (1900) ==
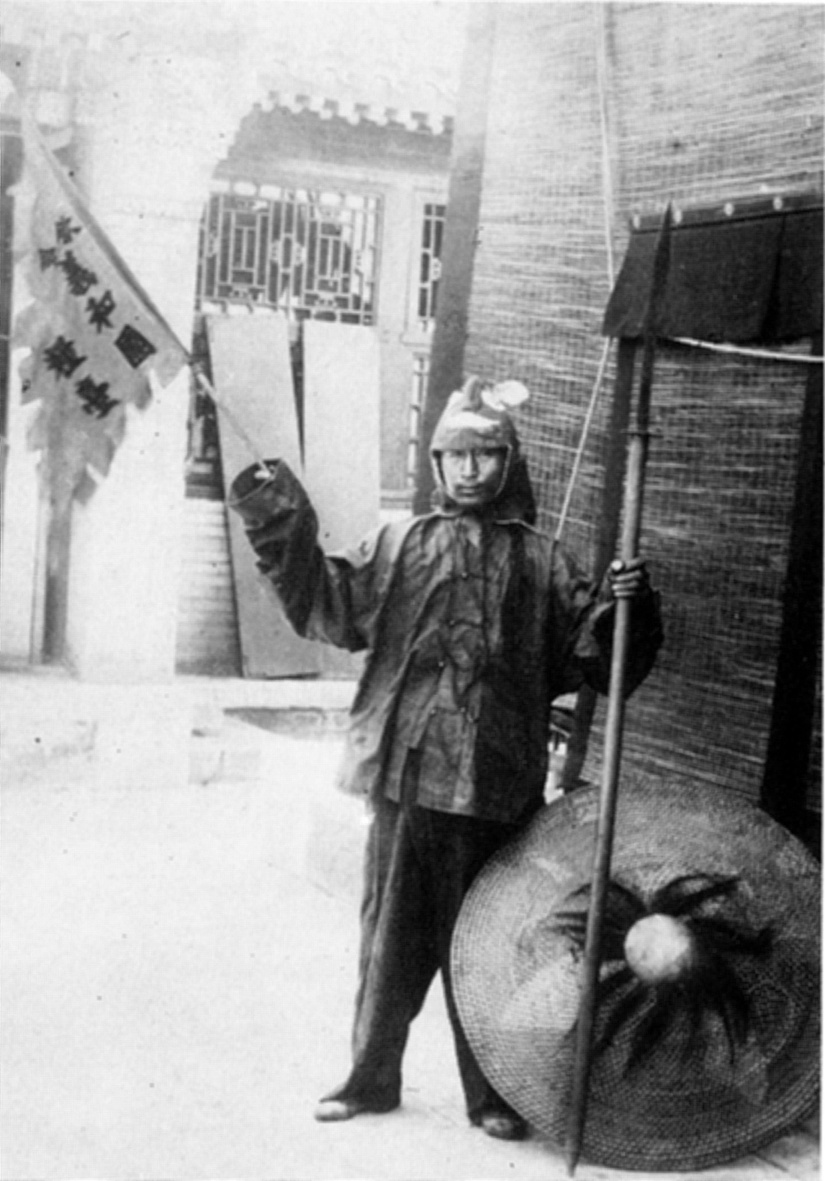
A Boxer during the revolt

The Boxer Rebellion in 1900 was the worst disaster in missionary history. One hundred and eighty-nine Protestant missionaries, including 53 children, (and many Roman Catholic priests and nuns) were killed by Boxers and Chinese soldiers in northern China. An estimated 2,000 Protestant Chinese Christians also were killed. The China Inland Mission lost more members than any other organization: 58 adults and 20 children were killed.

The Chinese had recognized the rights of the missionaries only because of the superiority of Western naval and military power. Many Chinese associated the missionaries with Western imperialism and resented them, especially the educated classes who feared changes that might threaten their position. As the foreign and missionary presence in China grew, so also did Chinese resentment of foreigners. The Boxers were a peasant mass movement, stimulated by drought and floods in the north China countryside. The Qing dynasty took the side of the Boxers, besieged the foreigners in Beijing in the Siege of the International Legations and was invaded by a coalition of foreign armies, the Eight Nation Alliance. The greatest loss of missionary lives was in Shanxi where, among others, all 15 members of the Oberlin Band were executed.

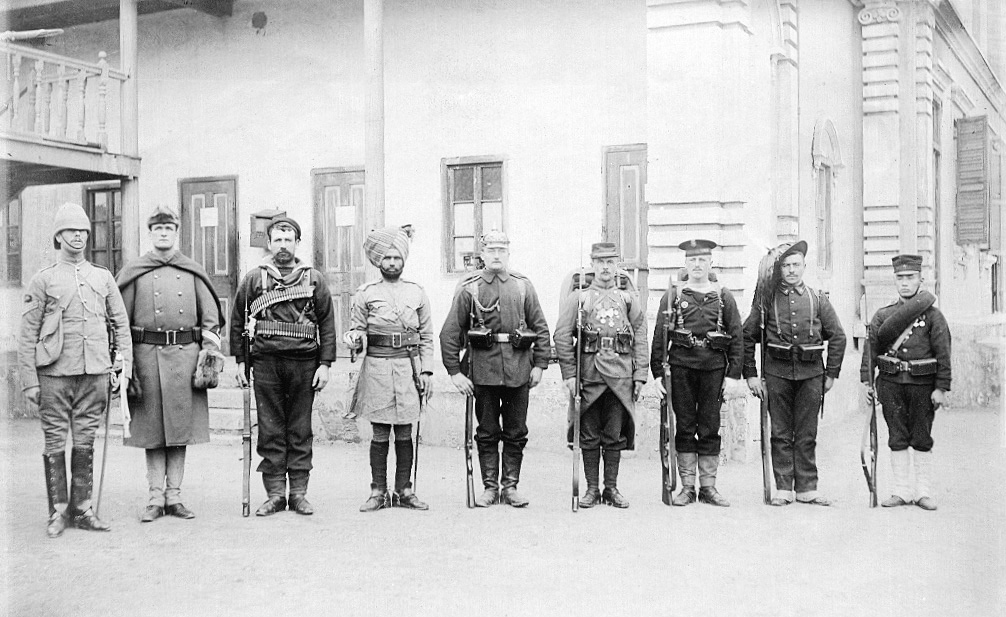
Troops of the Eight Nations Alliance

The Eight Nation Alliance imposed a heavy indemnity on China which Hudson Taylor of the CIM refused to accept. He wanted to demonstrate "the meekness and gentleness of Christ" to the Chinese. In the aftermath of the Boxer Rebellion, the foreign residents in northern China, especially the missionaries, came under attack in their home countries for looting. Missionaries, such as William Ament, utilized United States Army troops to confiscate goods and property from Boxers and alleged Boxers to compensate Christian families for their losses. Critics of such actions included the writer Mark Twain, who called Ament and his colleagues the "reverend bandits of the American Board".

The Boxer Rebellion had a profound impact on both China and the West. The Qing government attempted reform and missionaries found the Chinese more receptive to both their evangelical and their "civilizing" message, but the West lost the certainty of its conviction that it had the right to impose its culture and religion on China. The China Centenary Missionary Conference in 1907 affirmed that education and health were of equal importance with evangelism although traditionalists complained that "education and health are no substitute for preaching." Missionary activities after the Boxer Rebellion became increasingly secular.

== Abolition of the opium trade ==
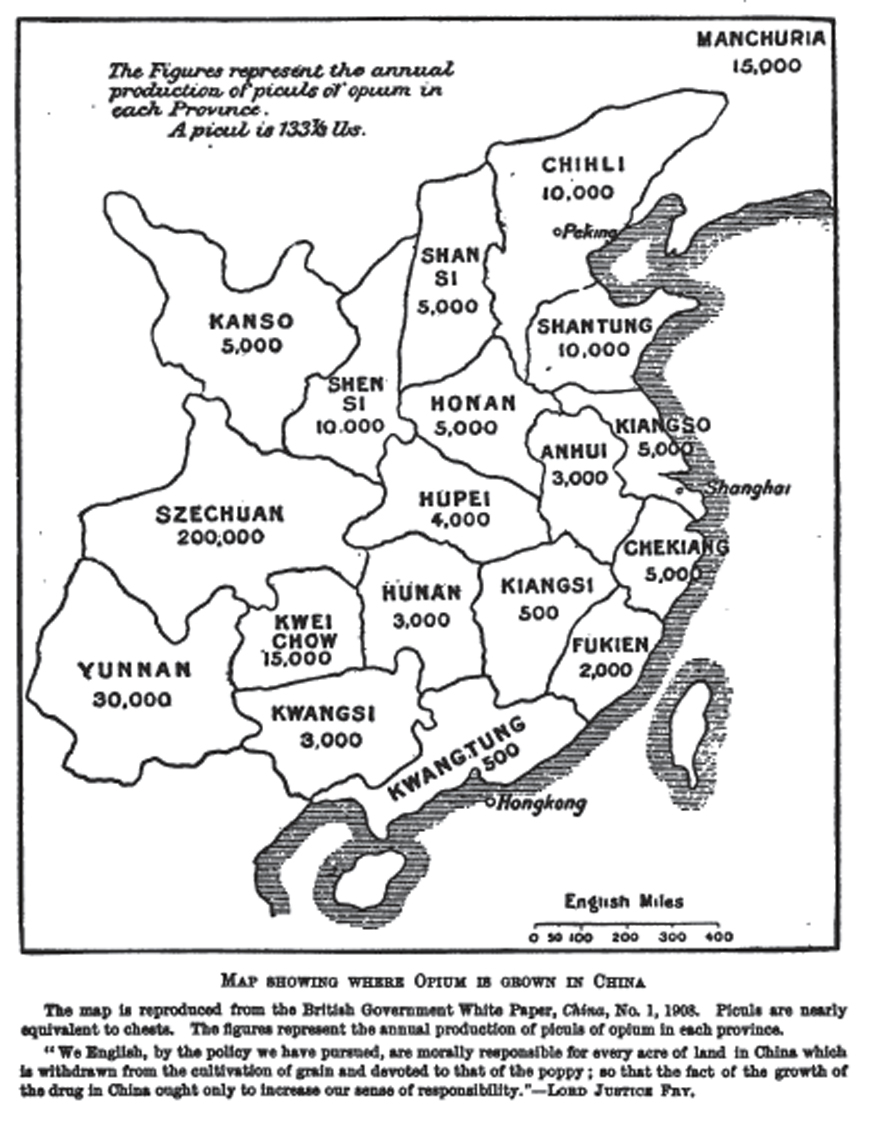
Map showing the amount of opium produced in China in 1908

Opium was Britain's most profitable export to China during the 19th century. Early missionaries, such as Bridgman, criticized the opium trade—but missionaries were equivocal. The treaties ending the two opium wars opened up China to missionary endeavor and some missionaries believed that the opium wars might be part of God's plan to make China a Christian nation. Later, as the social message of the missionaries began to compete with evangelism as a priority, the missionaries became more forthright in opposing the opium trade.

In the 1890s, the effects of opium use were still largely undocumented by science. Protestant missionaries in China compiled data to demonstrate the harm of the drug, which they had observed. They were outraged that the British Royal Commission on Opium visited India but not China. They created the Anti-Opium League in China among their colleagues in every mission station, for which the American missionary Hampden Coit DuBose served as the first president. This organization was instrumental in gathering data from Western-trained medical doctors in China, most of whom were missionaries. They published their data and conclusions in 1899 as Opinions of Over 100 Physicians on the Use of Opium in China. The survey included doctors in private practices, particularly in Shanghai and Hong Kong, as well as Chinese who had been trained in medical schools in Western countries.

In Britain, the home director of the China Inland Mission, Benjamin Broomhall, was an active opponent of the opium trade; he wrote two books to promote banning opium smoking: Truth about Opium Smoking and The Chinese Opium Smoker. In 1888 Broomhall formed and became secretary of the "Christian Union for the Severance of the British Empire with the Opium Traffic" and editor of its periodical, National Righteousness. He lobbied the British Parliament to stop the opium trade. He and James Laidlaw Maxwell appealed to the London Missionary Conference of 1888 and the Edinburgh Missionary Conference of 1910 to condemn the trade. As he lay dying, the government signed an agreement to end the opium trade within two years.

== Footbinding ==
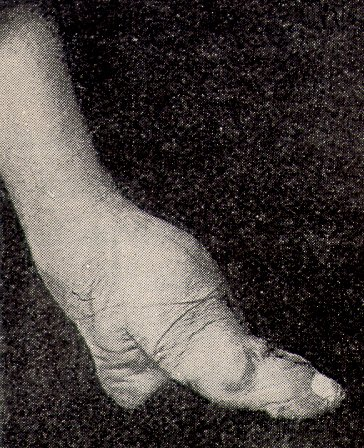
A bound foot

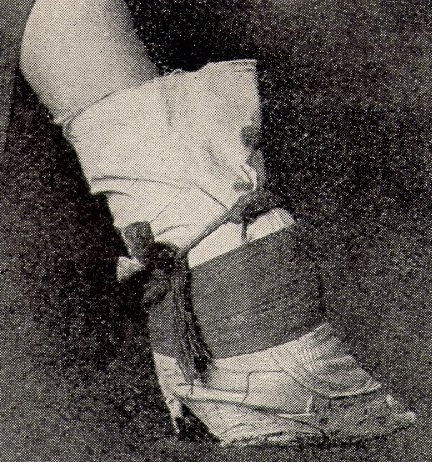
A bandaged bound foot

The rise to prominence of women missionaries also gave rise to missionary opposition to Chinese foot binding. Although male missionaries often considered footbinding as a matter of conscience rather than a sin against God, female missionaries vehemently opposed the custom. In the 1860s, American Presbyterian Helen Nevius and others combated foot binding by matchmaking, finding Christian husbands for young women with unbound feet. In 1872 in Beijing, American Methodist Mary Porter, who became the wife of Boxer Rebellion hero Frank Gamewell, banned girls with bound feet in her school and in 1874 an anti-footbinding organization was founded in Xiamen. By 1908 the majority of the Chinese elite had spoken out against footbinding and in 1911 the practice was prohibited, although the prohibition was not completely effective in remote areas.

== Physical education, sport, and "muscular Christianity" ==
Missionaries affected Chinese body culture not only through discouraging footbinding. Since the late 19th century, the YMCA in particular played a very prominent role in spreading scientific approaches to physical education and amateur sports as a form of Protestant citizenship training (Muscular Christianity) in China and other Asian countries. Among the results was the increasing integration of Western physical education practices into school curricular, the hosting of National Games since 1910, and the promotion of China's participation in and hosting of the Far Eastern Championship Games since 1913. Moreover, the International YMCA College (now Springfield College) became a central institution for training a first generation of Chinese physical educators in physical education and muscular Christian ideals.

== Expansion: 1901 to 1920s ==
The Boxer Uprising discredited xenophobia and opened the way for a period of growth in Protestant missionaries and missionary institutions, numbers of Christians, and acceptance by non-Christians. The period from 1900 until 1925 has been called the "Golden Age" for Christian missionaries in China. By 1919, there were 3,300 missionaries in China (not counting their children) divided about equally among married men, married women, and unmarried women and reached a high of 8,000, including children, in 1925. In 1926, civil war, political unrest, competition from ideologies such as Marxism, and the Great Depression saw the missionary enterprise begin to decline.

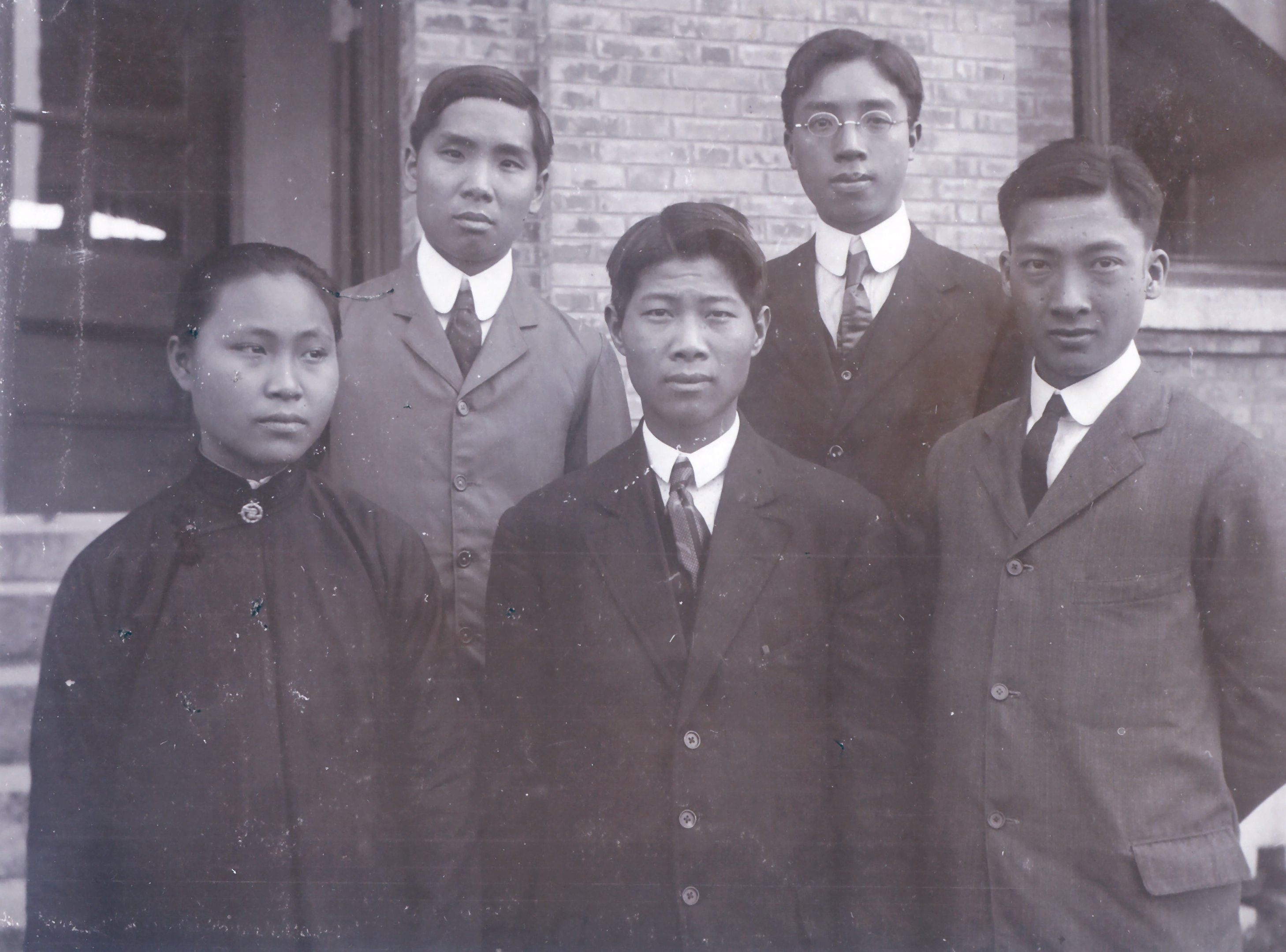
First graduating class of University Medical School in Canton, 1911

Example of missionary activity during this period include the following. Due to social custom, the women of China were reluctant to be treated by male doctors of Western medicine. This resulted in a demand for female doctors of Western medicine in China. Thus, female medical missionary Dr. Mary H. Fulton (1854–1927) was sent by the Foreign Missions Board of the Presbyterian Church (U.S.A.) to found the first medical college for women in China. Known as the Hackett Medical College for Women (夏葛女子醫學院), it was located in Guangzhou, China, and was enabled by a large donation from Mr. Edward A.K. Hackett (1851–1916) of Indiana, US. The college was dedicated in 1902 and offered a four-year curriculum. By 1915, there were more than 60 students, mostly in residence. Most students became Christians, due to the influence of Dr. Fulton. The college was officially recognized, with its diplomas marked with the official stamp of the Guangdong provincial government. The college was aimed at the spreading of Christianity and modern medicine and the elevation of Chinese women's social status. The David Gregg Hospital for Women and Children (also known as Yuji Hospital 柔濟醫院) was affiliated with this college. The graduates of this college included CHAU Lee-sun (周理信, 1890–1979) and WONG Yuen-hing (黃婉卿), both of whom graduated in the late 1910s and then practiced medicine in the hospitals in Guangdong province.

Dr. Fred P. Manget (1880–1979) went from Georgia, US, to Shanghai as a medical missionary in 1909. In 1912, he rented a building in Houzhou to establish a hospital that could hold about 30 beds. At the end of World War I, Dr. Manget returned to Shanghai and discussed with the representative of the Rockefeller Foundation in China about the Foundation's intention to spread the practice of Western medicine in China. After much negotiation, the Chinese Government agreed to provide 9 acres of land, while the Foundation provided US$30,000 to build a hospital in Huzhou. The Rockefeller Foundation also funded a hospital in Suzhou, China, after a request from missionary John Abner Snell. The remaining needed funds were provided by the Southern Methodist Church and the Northern Baptist Church in the US. Thus, the small hospital with a small rented building and one doctor was transformed into Huzhou General Hospital (湖州醫院), which had 9 acres of land, over 100 nurses and 100 other personnel, in addition to the most modern medical facilities in China. The facilities included a chemistry laboratory, an X-ray facility and a Nursing School. Later, Japanese troops occupied Huzhou General Hospital. The family members of Dr. Manget were able to leave China for the US. However, Dr. Manget was not willing to leave China. When he saw how the Japanese troops treated the Chinese people, he pointed out their wrongdoing. As a consequence, he was arrested by the Japanese troops, who accused him of espionage. Later, the Japanese troops released him. Under the strict control of the Japanese troops, Huzhou General Hospital reopened and Dr. Manget worked there for three and a half years.

Christian missions were especially successful among ethnic groups on the frontiers. For them Christianity offered not only spiritual attraction but resistance to Han Chinese. The British missionary Samuel Pollard, for instance, devised the Pollard Script for writing the Miao language in order to translate the Bible. A musician and an engineer named James O. Fraser was the first to work with the Lisu people of Yunnan in southwest China. This resulted in phenomenal church growth among the various ethnic groups in the area that endured into the 21st century.

A 2022 study found that the Protestant missionary activities led to a nationalist backlash in China, as local elites saw the missionary activities as a political threat and organized anti-foreign protests.

== Setbacks, questioning, and war (1919–1945) ==
By the 1920s, the mainline Protestant churches realized that conversions were not happening, despite all the schools and hospitals. Furthermore, they had come to appreciate the ethical and cultural values of a different civilization, and began to doubt their own superiority. The mainline Protestant denomination missionary work declined rapidly. In their place Chinese Christians increasingly took control. Furthermore, there was a rapid growth of fundamentalist, Pentecostal and Jehovah Witness missionaries who remained committed to the conversion process.

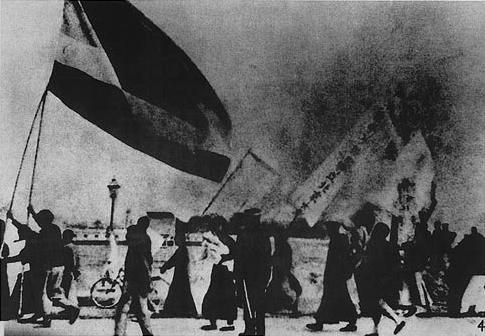
Beijing students protesting during the May Fourth Movement

The May Fourth Movement criticized all traditional beliefs and religions. The 1922 study The Christian Occupation of China presented view of the liberal wing of the missionary establishment that control should be turned over to Chinese, but the unfortunate title made matters worse. The Anti-Christian campaigns of the early 1920s, and the Northern Expedition of 1925–1927 led to the unification of China under the Nationalist Party. Liberal missionaries welcomed the opportunity to participate in the development of the Chinese nation, but the mission enterprise was attacked. As anti-imperialism grew, Christian schools were subjected to government regulation which required that all organizations have Chinese leadership. Many missionaries left China and support in home countries waned, partly because of economic problems during the Great Depression.

Criticism and calls for reform came from within the missionary community. Partly as a result of the Fundamentalist–Modernist Controversy missions came under questioning. Novelist and missionary Pearl S. Buck for example, returned to the United States in 1932 to ask "Is There a Case for Foreign Missionaries?". Buck's twin biographies of her parents, Fighting Angel and The Exile, dramatized the charges that foreign missions were a form of imperialism. Another skeptical note was sounded by the massive study commissioned by John D. Rockefeller Jr. entitled "Rethinking Missions" which cast doubt on a wide range of missionary activities.

In 1934 John and Betty Stam were murdered by Communist soldiers. Their biography The Triumph of John and Betty Stam (Philadelphia: China Inland Mission, 1935) was written by Mrs. Howard Taylor, a fellow missionary with the China Inland Mission. It inspired a new generation of missionaries to seek to work in China despite civil war and the anti-missionary views of many Chinese.

When the Japanese invaded China in World War II in 1937, the China Inland Mission and many other missionary organizations moved their headquarters up the Yangzi River to Chongqing. After Japan went to war with the Western countries in 1941, the Japanese interned Western civilians, including about 1,000 Protestant missionaries, in camps until the end the war in 1945, mostly at the Weihsien Compound in Shandong and the Stanley Internment Camp in Hong Kong. The entire staff and student body of the Chefoo School for missionary children, grades one to twelve, numbering 239 children and adults, were among those interned at Weihsien. Eric Liddell, the 1924 Olympic gold medalist and afterwards a missionary, was also interned at Weihsien and died of a cerebral hemorrhage during the war.

== Final exodus 1945–1953 ==
After the victory of the Chinese Communist armies in 1949 and suppression of Christian missionary efforts, the members of all missionary societies departed or were expelled from China. Missionaries Arthur Matthews (an American) and Dr. Rupert Clark (British) were placed under house arrest but were finally allowed to leave in 1953. Their wives, Wilda Matthews and Jeannette Clark, had been forced to leave with other missionaries before this. The China Inland Mission was the last Protestant missionary society to leave China.

In 1900 there were an estimated 100,000 Protestants in China. By 1950 the number had increased to 700,000, but still far less than one percent of the total Chinese population. Helped by strong leaders such as John Sung, Wang Ming-Dao, and Andrew Gih, the Chinese Protestant Christian churches became an indigenous movement.

== Impact on the United States ==
American missionaries had an audience at home who listen closely to their first-hand accounts. Around 1900 there were on average about 300 China missionaries on furlough back home, and they presented their case to church groups perhaps 30,000 times a year, reaching several million churchgoers. They were suffused with optimism that sooner or later China would be converted to Christianity.

Novelist Pearl S. Buck (1892–1973) was raised in a bilingual environment in China by her missionary parents. China was the setting for many of her best-selling novels and stories, which explored the hardships, and the depth of humanity of the people she loved, and considered fully equal. After college in the United States, she returned to China as a Presbyterian missionary 1914 to 1932. She taught English at the college level. The Good Earth (1931) was her best-selling novel, and a popular movie. Along with numerous other books and articles she reached a large middle-class American audience with a highly sympathetic view of China. The Nobel Prize committee for literature hailed her, "for the notable works which pave the way to a human sympathy passing over widely separated racial boundaries and for the studies of human ideals which are a great and living art of portraiture."

No one had more influence on American political thinking about foreign policy than Henry R. Luce (1898–1967), founder and publisher of TIME, LIFE and FORTUNE magazines from the 1920s to his death. He was born to missionary parents in China, and educated there until age 15. His Chinese experience made a deep impression, and his publications always gave large scale favorable attention to China. He gave some very strong support to Chiang Kai-shek in his battles against Mao Zedong.

The politically most influential returning missionary was Walter Judd (1898–1994) who served 10 years as a medical missionary in Fujian 1925-1931 and 1934–1938. On his return to Minnesota, he became an articulate spokesman denouncing the Japanese aggression against China, explaining it in terms of Japan's scarcity of raw materials and markets, population pressure, and the disorder and civil war in China. According to biographer Yanli Gao:

Judd was both a Wilsonian moralist and a Jacksonian protectionist, whose efforts were driven by a general Christian understanding of human beings, as well as a missionary complex. As he appealed simultaneously to American national interests and a popular Christian moral conscience, the Judd experience demonstrated that determined courageous advocacy by missionaries did in fact help to shape an American foreign policy needing to be awakened from its isolationist slumbers." Judd served two decades in Congress 1943-1962 as a Republican, where he was a highly influential spokesman on Asian affairs generally and especially China. He was a liberal missionary but a conservative anti-Communist congressman who defined the extent of American support for the Chiang Kai-shek regime.

== See also ==
- East Asia-United States relations#Missionaries in China
- Protestantism in China
- Che Kam Kong
- Christianity in China
- Chinese house church
- Chinese Union Version of the Bible
- Chinese New Hymnal
- China Christian Council
- Bible translations into Chinese
- Timeline of Christian missions
- List of Protestant missionary societies in China (1807–1953)

== Bibliography ==
- Austin, Alvyn (2007), China's Millions: The China Inland Mission and Late Qing Society, 1832–1905, Grand Rapids, Michigan: Eerdman's
- Broomhall, Marshall (1901), Martyred Missionaries of the China Inland Mission with a record of the Perils and Sufferings of Some Who Escaped, London: Morgan & Scott.
- Lodwick, Kathleen L. (2016). How Christianity Came to China: A Brief History. Minneapolis, Minnesota: Fortress Press. ISBN 9781451472301.
- Latourette, Kenneth Scott (1929), A History of Christian Missions in China, New York: Macmillan. Detailed survey, with quotes from many documents but not so much analysis.
- Maclay, Robert Samuel (1861), Life among the Chinese: with characteristic sketches and incidents of missionary operations and prospects in China, Carlton & Porter, p. 337
- Spence, Jonathan D (1991), The Search for Modern China, WW Norton & Company, ISBN 0-393-30780-8
