= Christianity in Xinjiang =

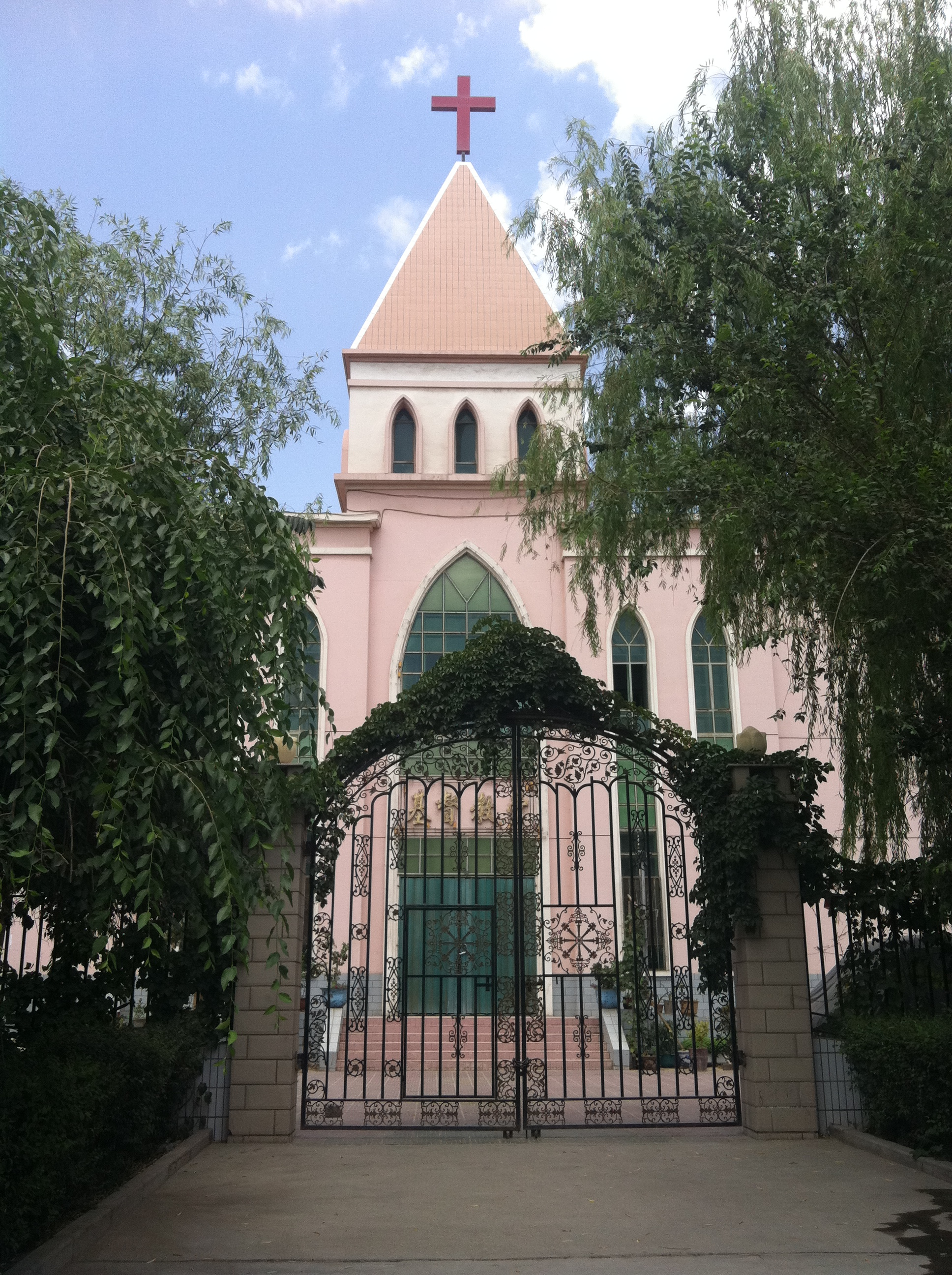
Christian Church in Hami

Christianity in Xinjiang, China, is a minority religion. The two dominant ethnic groups, the Uyghurs (44.96%) and Han Chinese (42.24%), predominantly follow Islam and Chinese folk religion, respectively, and very few people from either group are known to be Christian.

== Demographics ==
According to the Chinese General Social Survey of 2009, Christians in Xinjiang accounted of 1% of the population. According to Asia Harvest, estimates from 2020 suggest that of the entire population (24,992,119) about 3.77% is Christian (942,897).

In 2016, the white book Current Status of Xinjiang Freedom of Religion by Chinese government stated has Protestant church for 227, Catholic church for 26, Eastern Orthodox churches for 3.

== History ==
The Church of the East, reached Central Asia, Mongolia and China by the seventh century. The Turpan texts dating to the ninth and tenth centuries include translations of Christian sacred texts into several languages, including Christian Old Turkic. The tribe of the Keraites was known to be predominantly Christian from the 11th century and to the time of Genghis Khan. Likewise the Naiman and Ongud tribes were evangelised from the 11th century. The Uighur people were later Islamised.

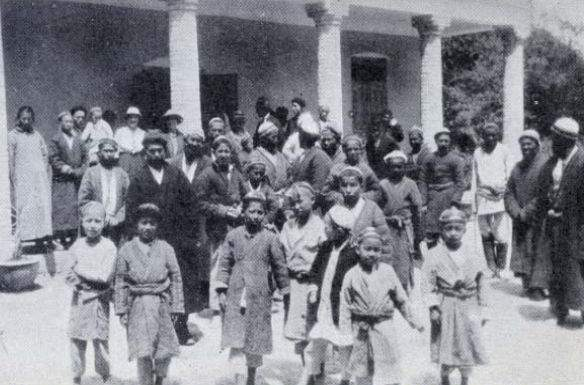
Christians outside the church at Kashgar in the early 1930s

In 1904, George W. Hunter with the China Inland Mission opened the first mission station for CIM in Xinjiang. But already in 1892, the Mission Covenant Church of Sweden started missions in the area around Kashgar, and later built mission stations, churches, hospitals and schools in Yarkant and Yengisar. In the 1930s there were several hundreds of Christians among this people, but because of persecution during the first East Turkestan Republic the churches were destroyed and the believers were scattered. The missionaries were expelled by the pro-Soviet regime of the Chinese warlord Sheng Shicai who, with the help of the Soviet Union, crushed the Kumul Rebellion.

Christian missionaries, such as British missionary Hunter, Turkish missionary Johannes Avetaranian, and Swedish missionaries Magnus Bäcklund, Nils Fredrik Höijer, Father Hendricks, Josef Mässrur, Anna Mässrur, Albert Andersson, Gustaf Ahlbert, Stina Mårtensson, John Törnquist, Gösta Raquette, Oskar Hermannson, and Nur Luke studied the Uyghur language and wrote works on it.

There were several hundred Uyghur Muslims converted to Christianity by the Swedes. Imprisonment and execution were inflicted on Uyghur Christian converts and after refusing to give up his Christian religion, and the Uyghur convert Habil was executed in 1933. Ultimately in 1938, Sheng Shicai's pro-Soviet regime banished the Swedish missionaries after Sheng's regime tortured and jailed Christian converts, who were made out of Kirghiz and Uyghurs. The Khotan Government subjected former Muslim Christian converts like Joseph Johannes Khan to jail, torture and abuse after he refused to give up Christianity in favor of Islam. After the British intervened to free Khan he was forced to leave his land and in November 1933 he came to Peshawar.

== Missionary history ==
=== Notable Christians ===
Alimjan Yimit (Alimujiang Yimiti) is one of several Uyghurs who have more recently converted to Christianity, who was arrested in 2009 and is serving a 15-year prison sentence for being a pastor. Wu'erkaixi (Örkesh Dölet) may also be a Christian, but this has not been publicly confirmed by him. According to ChinaAid, six more Christians were arrested in 2019 for preaching.

Yaqup Istipan fled to Sweden to escape persecution, sometimes using the Europeanised name "Jacob Stephen". He published an autobiography in 1947.

Doctor Nur Luke who was involved in early Bible translations into Uyghur.

=== Work with women ===
The Swedish missionaries observed the conditions of Uyghur Muslim women in Xinjiang during their stay there. The lack of Han Chinese women led to Uyghur Muslim women marrying Han Chinese men, These women were hated by their families and people. Unmarried Muslim Uyghur women who married non-Muslims like Chinese, Hindus, Armenians, Jews, and Russians if they could not find a Muslim husband while they were calling to Allah to grant them marriage by the shrines of saints. The Muslims also attacked the Swedish Christian mission and Hindus resident in the city. Lobbying by the Swedish Christian missionaries led to child marriage for under 15-year-old girls to be banned by the Chinese Governor in Ürümqi. Uyghur women converts to Christianity did not wear the veil. Uyghur Muslims rioted against Indian Hindu traders when the Hindus attempted to practice their religious affairs in public and also rose up against the Swedish Christian mission in 1907.

=== Persecution ===
Mullahs directed violence against the missionaries from Sweden since 1894 and it was only due to action taken by Chinese officials that a Uyghur Muslim apostate who became a Christian named Omar was saved from execution at the hands of mullahs. In 1899, the headquarters of the Swedish missionaries was violently obliterated by a mass of rioters. This anti-Christian riot was incited by the landlord of the property who argued with his Swedish renters. The Swedish missionaries welfare was one of the concerns by the British during the Xinhai Revolution. The residences of the Swedish missionaries were attacked by mobs and violent outbreaks resulted in a garden becoming their home since nobody would rent to them.

An anti-Christian mob broke out among the Muslims in Kashgar against the Swedish missionaries in 1923. Violence and tensions brewed by Muslims who were stirred by Muslim apostates becoming Christian due to the Swedes in Ramadan of 1923. Orders to stop rioting were given to the Muslim Qazis and merchants by the Chinese Tao Tai after British diplomats contacted him.

The Bughras applied Shari'a while ejecting the Khotan-based Swedish missionaries. They demanded the withdrawal of the Swedish missionaries while enacting Shariah on March 16, 1933.

=== Other governments ===
Werner Otto von Hentig during the Niedermayer–Hentig Expedition was assisted by a tip off from a Swedish missionary. Along with British diplomats, the Kashgar-based missionaries from Sweden were prominent among European expatriates in the area. Eleanor Holgate Lattimore met the Swedish missionaries and British diplomats in Kashgar.

The Swedish Mission Society ran a printing operation. Life of East Turkestan was the state run media of the rebel First East Turkestan Republic in the Kumul Rebellion. The Sabit Damolla lead government used the Swedish Mission Press to print and distribute the media.

== See also ==
- Apostolic Prefecture of Xinjiang-Urumqi
- China Inland Mission
- George W. Hunter
- Mission Covenant Church of Sweden
- Uerkesh Davlet
- Alimjan Yimit
- Nur Luke
- Christianity in China
- Christianity in Xinjiang's neighbouring provinces
  - Christianity in Qinghai
  - Christianity in Tibet
