= Julia Brown =

Julia Brown may refer to:

- Julia Brown (actress) (born 1997), Scottish actress
- Julia Brown (organist), Brazilian classical organist
- Julia Brown (prostitute), American 19th-century madam and prostitute
- Julia Brown (artist) (born 1978), American artist
- Julia Brown Mateer (died 1898), American educator and Presbyterian missionary
- Julia Brown (band), an American indie pop band

== See also ==
- Julie Brown (disambiguation)
