= Raquette =

Raquette, Rackete, or Rakete may refer to:

== Places ==
- Raquette Lake, the source of the Raquette River
- Raquette Lake, New York, a community in the Town of Long Lake in Hamilton County
- Raquette River, a tributary of the Saint Lawrence River located entirely in New York state

== People ==
- Gösta Raquette or Gustaf Rikard Raquette (also spelled Gustav) (1871–1945), missionary with the Mission Covenant Church of Sweden
- Carola Rackete, a German sea captain and human rights activist
- Jim Rakete, a German photographer
