= RCUV =

RCUV may refer to:

- Regional Council of Unrecognized Villages, a democratic representative body for the residents of the Bedouin unrecognized villages of the Negev Desert
- Revised Chinese Union Version, an updated Chinese translation of the Bible
