= CUNP =

CUNP may refer to:

- Certified Urologic Nurse Practitioner, see Nursing credentials and certifications
- Chinese Union Version with New Punctuation, an updated Chinese translation of Bible
