= Muhammad Shukri =

Muhammad Shukri may refer to:

- Muhammad Shukri (author) (1935-2003), Moroccan writer
- Mohammad Shukri (cricketer), Malaysian cricketer
- Muhammad Shukri Effendi, or Johannes Avetaranian, Turkish descendant of Muhammad, Christian convert and missionary
