= Hong Kong Bible Society =

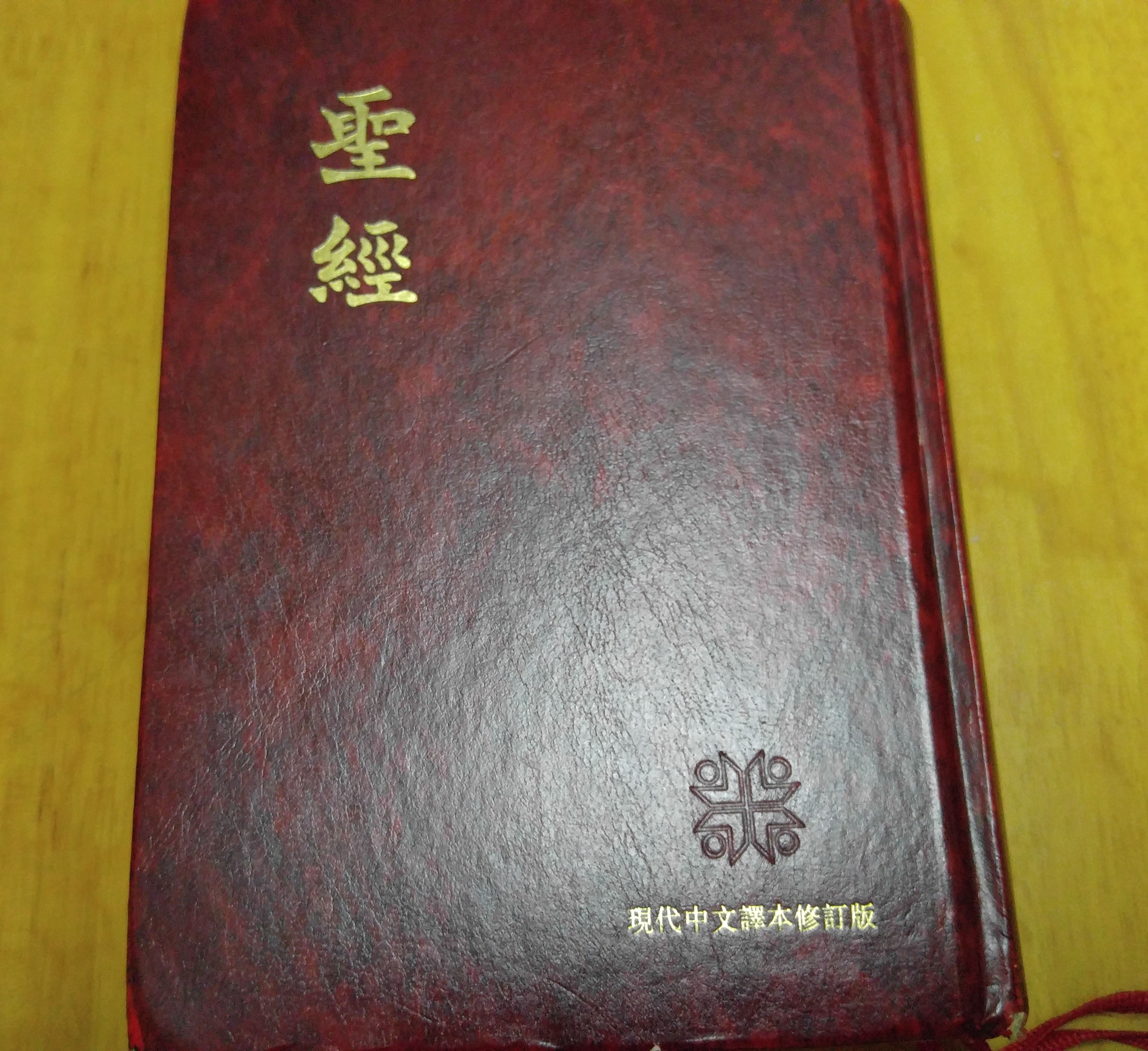
"Today's Chinese Version Bible" published by the Bible Society of Hong Kong

The Hong Kong Bible Society (Chinese: 香港聖經公會) is a Christian organization for translating, printing, distributing, and promoting the Bible in Hong Kong and Macau. Established in 1950, the society soon made Hong Kong a global center for Chinese Protestant Bible publishing and distribution. Their Bible translation includes the Chinese Union Version with New Punctuation, the Revised Chinese Union Version and the Today's Chinese Version Bible.

== History ==
In 1937, the China Bible House was established in Shanghai, China.

In 1948, due to the unfavorable situation during the Chinese Civil War, the Bible house (the then national Bible society of China) relocated to Hong Kong. And Hong Kong started to develop into a world Chinese Bible publishing center.

In 1950, the Hong Kong Bible Society was established based on the bible house, in a humble rented office at a corner partitioned within a balcony. At the same time, Hong Kong Bible Society became a member of the United Bible Societies. It was the first organization to publish Bibles in Hong Kong. Its principles were to “Deliver a Bible that people can understand at a price that they can afford.”

In 1965, the United Bible Societies invested HK$700,000 in building a printing center in Hong Kong, further consolidating the city's status as a global Bible publishing center.

The United Bible Societies began work on revising the Chinese Union Version in 1985 and handed it over to the Bible Society of Hong Kong in 2000. With the participation of Bible scholars from Hong Kong, Taiwan, China mainland, Malaysia and Singapore, the New Testament was published in 2006, and the entire Old and New Testaments were published in 2010, representing a total of over 30 years of work.

In 1986, the United Bible Societies and the Amity Foundation established the Nanjing Amity Press. Over two hundred million copies of Bibles have been published by the press so far. And, during this process, the Bible Society of Hong Kong was committed to revising, promoting and distributing Bibles, especially the Chinese Union Version, as well as making donations to the course.

== Publication ==
The Bible Society of Hong Kong has participated in the translation and publication of the following Bible versions:

- Lu’s Translation (published in 1970),
- Today’s Chinese Version (TCV, published in 1979),
- Chinese Union Version with New Punctuation (CUNP) (published in 1988),
- New Cantonese Bible (published in 1997),
- New Cantonese Bible (revised edition, 2006)
- Revised Chinese Union Version (RCUV) (published in 2010),

In addition, there are the CHINESE Children’s Bible and the Mongolian Bible, etc.

== See also ==
- United Bible Societies
- Chinese Union Version
