= Höijer =

Höijer or Hoijer is a surname. Notable people with the surname include:

== Höijer ==
- Björn-Erik Höijer (1907–1996), Swedish writer
- Theodor Höijer (1843–1910),
- Nils Fredrik Höijer (1857–1925), Swedish missionary

== Hoijer ==
- Harry Hoijer (1904–1976), linguist and anthropologist
