= Chester Holcombe =

American diplomat (1842–1912)

Chester Holcombe (1842 in Winfield, New York – 1912) was an American missionary to China, diplomat, and author.

Holcombe graduated from Union College, where he was selected to Phi Beta Kappa. Ordained as a Presbyterian minister, he performed missionary work in China. In 1884, S. Wells Williams, the distinguished missionary who had become secretary to the American legation in Beijing, asked Holcombe to be his replacement. As a diplomat, he filled various posts in US diplomatic service in China, helping in the negotiations of two treaties between the United States and China. He was the author of The Real Chinaman (1895) and The Real Chinese Question (1900), which attempted to expose myths concerning China, Chinese culture, and the issue of Chinese immigration to the United States. In September, 1906, he published "The Missionary Enterprise," in The Atlantic Monthly, a defense from the accusations following the Boxer Uprising.

== Bibliography ==
- The Real Chinaman Dodd, Mead & Company, New York, 1895.
- The Real Chinese Question Dodd, Mead & Company, New York, 1900
- China's Past & Future Morgan and Scott, London, 1904.
