= Chinese Union Bible with New Punctuation =

Chinese Union Version with New Punctuation
- Full name: Chinese Union Version of the Bible with New Punctuation
- Language: Chinese
- OT published: 1988
- NT published: 1988
- Complete Bible published: 1988
- Authorship: United Bible Societies
- Translation type: Literal translation
- Publisher: United Bible Societies
- Genesis 1:1–3 起初，神創造天地。地是空虛混沌，淵面黑暗；神的靈運行在水面上。神說：「要有光」，就有了光。 John 3:16 神愛世人，甚至將他的獨生子賜給他們，叫一切信他的，不致滅亡，反得永生。

Chinese Union Bible with New Punctuation
- Traditional Chinese: 新標點聖經和合本
- Simplified Chinese: 新标点圣经和合本
Transcriptions
Standard Mandarin
- Hanyu Pinyin: Xīnbiāodiǎn Shèngjīng Héhéběn
Yue: Cantonese
- Jyutping: san1 biu1 dim2 sing3 ging1 wo4 hap6 bun2

The Chinese Union Bible with New Punctuation, commonly referred to as Chinese Union Version with New Punctuation (CUNP or CUVNP) in the Christian circles, is a Protestant bible with modern punctuation for the Chinese Union Version, a bible translation for Chinese believers. It was revised in word choice, paragraph division, and punctuation by a team of Bible scholars, translation consultants and editors and published by the United Bible Societies in 1988, in both Simplified and Traditional Chinese.

== Features and Overview ==
Mainly, modern punctuation marks are used to replace the old punctuation marks in the Chinese Union Version.

If the original text is in poetic style, poetic arrangement is used.

The wording of the Old and New Testaments is unified as much as possible, and modern common words are used, such as using "夠 (enough)" instead of "彀"; "才 (only, talent)" instead of "纔".

More appropriate names of people and place are used, such as "呂便" (Reuben) instead of "流便", "該撒 (Caesar) was changed to "凱撒". In Romans 15:23, "士班雅" (Spain) was changed to "西班牙". In Genesis 15:18, "伯拉大河" (the Euphrates River) was changed to "幼發拉底河" etc.

The third person pronouns are divided into "他" (he) for male, "她" (she) for female, "牠 " (it) for animals, and "它" (it) for things, according to the situation, so that readers can distinguish them more easily;

For subordinate place names or personal names in the text, "的" is added in a few places to avoid confusion. For example, "猶大伯利恆" (Bethlehem, Judah) was changed to "猶大的伯利恆".

The subheadings have parallel verses for readers' reference.

The Taiwan Bible Society has published a series of "New Punctuation Union Version Bible Study Books" that provides information on the history, customs, and culture of each book of the Bible in concise text and color pictures, and explains the development of literature and ideas therein.

The Chinese Union Version with New Punctuation was published by the United Bible Societies in 1988. In 1989, the China Christian Council published the Union Version with Simplified Chinese Characters and Modern Punctuation. This version had similar changes to the Union Version with New Punctuation, except that it was printed in simplified Chinese characters.

== Difference examples ==
The New Punctuation Union Version is basically not changed from the original Union Version in terms of wording and style. The relationship between the 1988 New Punctuation Union Version and the 1919 Union Version is like the relationship between the 1769 King James Version and the 1611 King James Version. The former has updated spelling and punctuation to make it consistent with modern times.

=== Genesis 15:18 ===
- (KJV 1611) saying; Unto thy seed haue I giuen this land from the river of Egypt to the great river, the river Euphrates:
- (KJV 1769) saying, Unto thy seed have I given this land, from the river of Egypt to the great river, the river Euphrates:
- (Union Version) 說、我已賜給你的後裔、從埃及河直到伯拉大河之地.
- (Union Version with New Punctuation) 說：「我已賜給你的後裔，從埃及河直到幼發拉底大河之地，

=== Isaiah 11:1 ===
- (Union Version) 從耶西的本(原文作𣎴 (Note: "𣎴", pinyin: dǔn, the shape is similar to but not the same as character “不” (bù).))必發一條、從他根生的枝子必結果實。
- (New Punctuation Union Version) 從耶西的本(原文是墩)必發一條；從他根生的枝子必結果實。

== Controversy ==
=== Translation name modification ===
1. "流便" (Reuben): The "New Union Version" publication notes mentioned that indecent translation names, such as "流便", would be replaced by "呂便". However, it did not consider that "流便" also means "fluent writing without stagnation". Moreover, if the word "便" is inconvenient, it should be changed to "本".

2. “推羅” (Tyre): The 1988 Union Version with New Punctuation changed "推羅" to “泰爾”, but the 1989 Union Version with Simplified Chinese Characters and Modern Punctuation published by the China Christian Council did not change it to “泰爾” because “推羅” is closer to the pronunciation of the original text. The 2010 Revised Union Version changed it back to “推羅”.

=== Version Issues ===
Since the 1988 Union Version with New Punctuation changed the punctuation, paragraph divisions, and place names of the Union Version, and the copyright of the 1919 Union Version had expired, many publishers followed suit and published their own Union Versions with new punctuation. There are also many electronic versions of the Union Version with new punctuation available for download on the Internet. These “new punctuation” versions that are not authorized by the United Bible Societies may have problems with typographical errors.

== See also ==
- United Bible Societies
- Chinese Union Version
- Revised Chinese Union Version of the Bible
- Chinese Bible Translations
- List of Chinese Bible translations
