= Warichū =

Warichū (割注 or 割註, sometimes 割り注, literally "split annotation") is the Japanese word for the traditional East Asian typographic device of typesetting in small double lines editorial comments, notes, parenthetical comments, and other annotations that may or may not belong to the text proper. It is used for the same kind of text which in English would be placed between parentheses or brackets, or in footnotes. The word "warichū" itself is used in some computer programs that deal with "CJK" typesetting, and in discussions about CJK typography.

== Visual appearance ==
The warichū is typeset by setting the annotation using small type that is about half size, cutting it into two equal parts, stacking them on top of each other, and then putting the resulting stacked lines into the space of a normal line of text.

Because Han characters are typically typeset with equal width and height, the two halves of a warichū annotation should contain exactly the same number of characters if the annotation itself contains an even number of characters. If the annotation contains an odd number of characters, the first half should have exactly one character more than the second half.

If the annotation is too long, line wrapping may occur. In that case, the warichū itself will behave like two or more tiny pages, wrapping the annotation inside several parts of the line-wrapped warichū.

== Modern use ==
Example in parentheses
分 注
︵
入 さ れ た 註	本 文 中 に 挿
︶
は

In Japanese typography, warichū is still sometimes used, in dictionaries for example. However, it has fallen into disuse in Chinese typography to such an extent that Chinese people will most likely either find it archaic, or will not know what it is when they see it.

- In Japanese dictionaries, warichū may be used as an alternative to ruby, sometimes providing several alternative pronunciations in the same warichū. When multiple pronunciation keys are given in the same annotation, the annotation can be cut into unequal halves.
- In the Chinese Union Version of the Bible, warichū is used for editorial comments and other annotations which do not belong to the text proper. This is probably the only widely-encountered Chinese book commonly in use today that still uses warichū to typeset its annotations.

Warichū tend to be used only in vertical writing.

== Warichū in computing ==
Some of the typesetting programs and word processors support typesetting warichū if support for "Asian" typography is turned on. In Adobe Illustrator and Adobe InDesign, it is called "warichu"; some other programs (for example, OpenOffice.org) avoid the word by calling it "writing in double lines", describing the visual appearance of warichū.

Some programs claim to support warichū but fail to do it correctly. For example, some programs cannot split the annotation into equal halves.

Adobe Illustrator allows one to create warichū which consists of more than two lines, though warichū is traditionally always split into only two lines.

There is also a macro for typesetting warichū in LaTeX, called Gezhu (simplified Chinese: 割注; traditional Chinese: 割註; pinyin: gēzhù).
