= John Törnquist =

Swedish missionary

- Missionary to East Turkestan
- Born: 17 November 1876; Lima Parish, Kopparberg County, Sweden
- Died: 1937 (aged 60–61)
- Spouse: Ellen Törnquist née Rosén

John Törnquist (17 November 1876 – 1937) was a Swedish missionary. He served with the Swedish Missionary Society in Chinese Turkestan (present day Xinjiang).

Törnquist first arrived in Eastern Turkestan on 24 September 1904 and married Ellen Rosén on 15 May 1906. Their daughter, Ester Karin, died age 1, in Kashgar on 6 January 1911.

Törnquist was the longest serving missionary of the Swedish Missionary Society in Chinese Turkestan. For long periods he was the only one in the field working specifically among the Chinese. The Xinjiang missionaries from Sweden who worked among Chinese weren't very many. Most of them worked among the Uyghurs. Albert Andersson and his wife worked among the Chinese from 1903 to 1912, Carl Persson in the 1920s, Ellen Törnquist from 1905 to 1923, Sigrid Larsson during the late 1920s. John Törnquist served from 1904 to 1937.

In 1924 John Törnquist wrote the following to Mr. Nyren, the Mission Director: "Of the 35 missionaries that have been working here so far, only three men and one woman have been fluent in the Chinese language. Out of the 22 years that the Chinese Mission has been in existence, I have been the only missionary to the Chinese for ten years."

Missionary life was not easy, but Törnquist was completely devoted to serving God, he is quoted as saying in 1919 to a group of young people in Sweden: "If I were to start my life all over again, I would have no greater ambition than to be a missionary."

And in 1935, two years before his death, he writes in his diary on the way out to East Turkestan: "If God the Father suddenly spoke to me in a human voice and said, 'You have 30 years to live on earth, provided you stay in Europe. If, however, you prefer to go to Asia, you will only have ten years', I would then gladly accept the ten years and continue on my journey to the field."

Tornquist also wrote many pieces of poetry. He documented his work in photography, some of that can be found at Etnografiska museet in Sweden. There are also video recordings from his time in East Turkestan at Lund university.

== Bibliography ==
- John Törnquist, Från Kaschgar till Jerusalem, Svenska Missionsförbundets, Förlag, Stokcholm.
- John Törnquist, Genom vildmarker och sagoländer, Stockholm, 1928
- John Törnquist, Kashgar, Stockholm: Svenska Missionsförbundets Förlag, 1926
- John Törnquist, Missionen i Ostturkestan
