= Julia Brown Mateer =

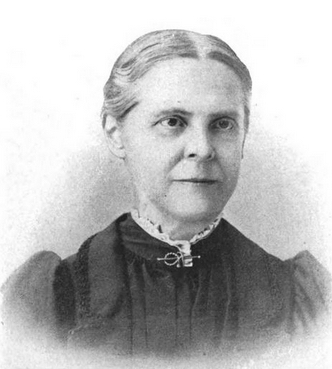
Julia Brown Mateer, from a 1912 publication

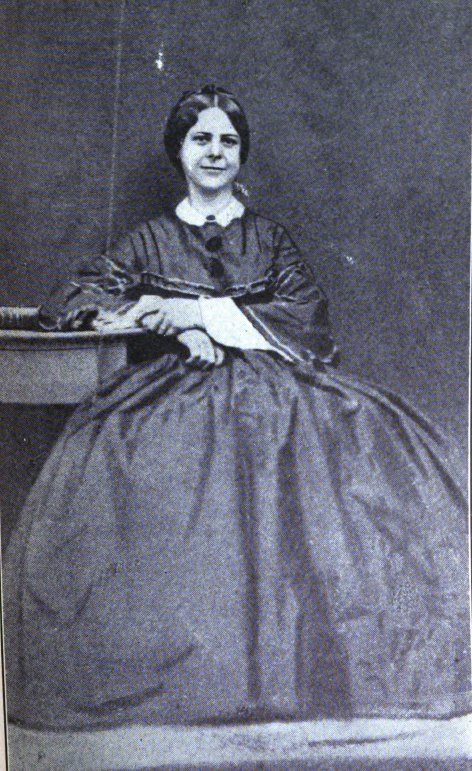
Julia Brown Mateer after arrival in China

Julia Brown Mateer (before 1840 – February 18, 1898) was an American teacher, school matron, and Presbyterian missionary in China, working there with her husband Calvin Wilson Mateer for thirty-four years.

== Early life ==
Julia Brown was born on her family's farm in Delaware, Ohio, the daughter of Robert Brown and Hannah Cunningham Brown. Her father was a cabinetmaker. She was educated in Granville, Ohio.

== Career ==
Julia Brown taught school in Mt. Gilead, Ohio as a young woman. Soon after marrying, she and her new husband sailed from New York, as Presbyterian missionaries to Shantung in China. They joined the missionaries at Tengchow in early 1864. Both Mateers learned to speak and write Mandarin for their work, and compiled a manual for other missionaries learning the language. They began and ran a boys' boarding school, which grew into the first Christian college in China, into Cheeloo University, and eventually into Shandong University. She taught younger children, tended to student health, ran study groups, and was especially interested to teach music. "The school had been Julia's idea, and for ten years, or up to 1873, she did almost all the work of running it," according to one later historian's assessment. "More are ready to preach the Gospel than are willing to settle down to the persistent, steady, hard pull of educational work," she explained of the educational emphasis of their mission. Her sister Margaret Brown Capp came to teach with her for a few years, before opening a girls' school of her own.

The Mateers took their first furlough in 1880. By then, their school had grown to employ a faculty of Chinese educators, and they spent their furlough raising funds for the school to grow further. Julia Mateer only had one more furlough, in 1892-1893, this time to raise funds and talk about her work at the college in Tenghchow. She traveled by donkey to visit pupils, former pupils, and Chinese Christian communities. She hosted new missionaries to the region in her home, often for months, providing practical training and advice.

== Personal life ==
Julia Brown married Rev. Calvin W. Mateer in 1862. She died in China in 1898, after a long illness.
