= Julie Brown (disambiguation) =

Julie Brown (born 1958) is an American comedic actress, singer and songwriter.

Julie Brown may also refer to:

- Julie Brown (runner) (born 1955), American long-distance runner
- Downtown Julie Brown (born 1963), English television personality
- Julie Caitlin Brown (born 1961), American television actress who starred in Babylon 5
- Julie K. Brown (born 1961), American journalist
