= Calvin Wilson Mateer =

American missionary and educator in China

Calvin Wilson Mateer (狄考文)
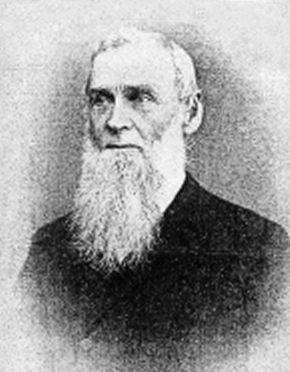
- Calvin Wilson Mateer
- Born: January 9, 1836; Cumberland County, Pennsylvania, United States
- Died: September 28, 1908 (aged 72); Qingdao, China
- Occupation: Missionary
- Years active: 45 Years
- Known for: Educational Mission in China
- Spouse: Julia Brown

Calvin Wilson Mateer (Chinese: 狄考文; pinyin: Dí Kǎowén, sometimes misspelt "Matteer") (9 January 1836 – 28 September 1908) was a missionary to China with the American Presbyterian Mission. He was of Scottish-Irish descent and a native of Cumberland County, Pennsylvania. He graduated from Western Theological Seminary, Pittsburgh. After serving with the Presbyterian church of Delaware, Ohio, for two years, he arrived in Dengzhou (today part of Penglai City, Shandong) with his wife Julia Brown Mateer in early January 1864 and continued to work as a missionary in China for 45 years.

He was the chairman of the committee for Bible translation and presided over the translation of the widely circulated Chinese translation of the Holy Bible, The Chinese Union Version.

In 1882, Mateer founded Tengchow College as the first modern institution of higher education in China. Tengchow College became a predecessor of Cheeloo University, and finally of Shandong University.

His Course of Mandarin Lessons, based on idiom, first published in 1892, was a popular text for learners, garnering four further editions by 1922.

He died in 1908 in Qingdao, China.

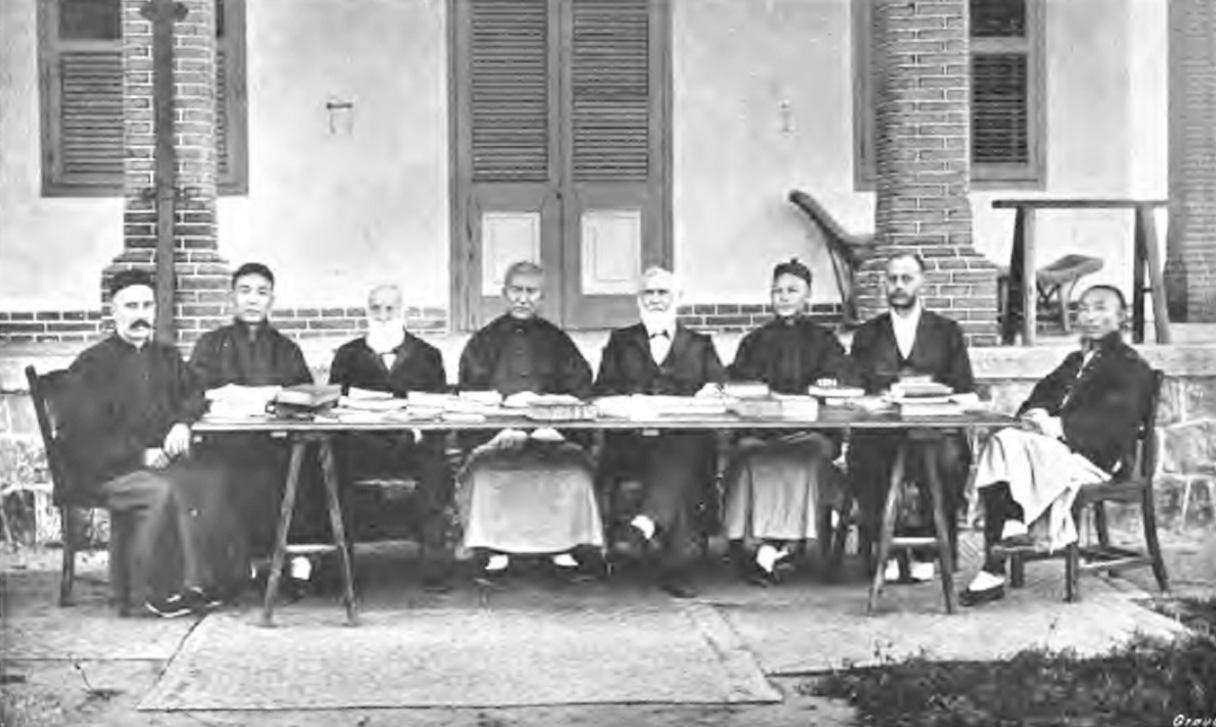
Frederick W. Baller, Chauncey Goodrich, Calvin Wilson Mateer, and Spencer Lewis, their respective Chinese language assistants on their left
