= Julia Brown (organist) =

Brazilian classical organist

Julia Brown is a Brazilian classical organist.

== Biography and career ==
Julia Brown was born in Rio de Janeiro, Brazil and grew up in Campinas, in São Paulo State. She graduated from Unicamp State University with a degree in piano performance, then received a scholarship from the Brazilian government to study organ at Northwestern University in Evanston, Illinois. After earning a Master's degree and Doctorate with Wolfgang Rübsam, she returned to Brazil, between 1996 and 1999, where she was president of the Brazilian Association of Organists. She helped organize the Fifth Convention of Latin American Organists, the Third Festival of Sacred Music in São Paulo, and began a concert series on the historic Cavaillé-Coll organ in the Metropolitan Cathedral of Campinas.

Brown has performed in North and South America, as well as in Europe, and has played at the Oregon Bach Festival, the International Organ Festival in Uruguay, and the 2008 National Convention of the American Guild of Organists in Minneapolis, Minnesota. Brown has attended master classes in many locations to further her interest in historical performance practice. She also plays harpsichord, with the early music ensemble Cascade Consort, which she co-founded.

Julia Brown has recorded a number of CDs for the Amadis, Paulus and Naxos labels, notably including works by Buxtehude, Scheidemann and Wilhelm Friedemann Bach.

She currently serves as Director of Music and Organist at Mayflower Congregational Church in Grand Rapids, Michigan.
