= Julia Brown (artist) =

American artist (born 1978)

- Born: 1978 (age 47–48); Ypsilanti, Michigan, United States
- Website: http://cargocollective.com/juliabrown

Julia Brown (born 1978) is an American-born artist who works in photography, installation and video. Her work is largely concerned with subject formation, visibility, invisibility and the political power of representation. Brown is an assistant professor of painting in the Department of Fine Arts and Art History at George Washington University.

== Education & awards ==
Brown received a BA in studio art from Williams College in 2000, and an MFA from CalArts in 2006. Brown has participated in a number of residencies, including VIR Viafarini-in-Residence, the Fondazione Ratti Corso Superiore di Arti Visive, Skowhegan School of Painting and Sculpture, and was a Visual Arts Fellow at the Fine Arts Work Center in 2008-2009 and 2010–2011. Brown was a studio fellow at the Whitney Independent Study Program in 2010, a Smithsonian Awards 2013 Artist Research Fellowship, and is currently a 2013–2014 Artist-in-Residency at the Museum of Fine Arts, Houston CORE Program.

== Exhibitions ==
Julia Brown has been exhibited in New York at Art in General, The Kitchen, BronxArtSpace Scaramouche Gallery, Harvestworks Media Festival, Talman + Monroe, LMAK Projects, and the Artists Space Project Room, The Brucennial; in Los Angeles at LACE and Supersonic at Barnsdall Gallery; Real Art Ways Houston; Blaffer Art Museum Wichita; Ulrich Museum of Art, Hartford; Provincetown Art Association Museum (PAAM); Via Farini, Milan; Kunsthalle Düsseldorf; Form Video, London; Blank Projects, Cape Town, and at The Gallery Apart, Italy.

== Selected bibliography ==
2017 Atallah, Lara, “Critics’ Picks: New York ‘The Intricacies of Love’” Artforum

2016 Tennant, Donna, “Editor’s Picks: Julia Brown,” Visual Art Source, April 2016.

2014 Lewis, Abigail, “Interview with Mike Watson – The Gallery Apart,” NERO Magazine. January 2014.

2012 Hope, Eric, “East City Art Reviews” ’19 Ways of Looking at a Painting’ at Porch Projects.”

2009 Parsons, Laura, “Body of Work: Brown Offers an Object-ive View,” The Hook.

2009 Genocchio, Benjamin, “Collective Strangeness in Hartford,” New York Times, 21 Dec., 2009.

2008 Hoffman, Hank. Blog. "Diverse 'Archaeology of Wonder' show at Real Art Ways," Connecticut Art Scene. 10 Dec., 2008.

2008 Caruth, Nicole, “Near Sighted Far Out; Julia Brown,” Harvestworks Digital Media Arts Center. 26 Sept., 2008.

2006 Fette. Blog. “CalArts MFA Open Studios,” The Flog. 12 April 2006.

== Selected publications ==
2016 Frater, Sally, The Swim, Catalogue, Ulrich Museum of Art, Wichita, KS

2015 LeClere, Mary, Core 2015, Catalogue, The Core Program, Museum of Fine Arts Houston. 5, 6–9, 78.

2014 Leclere, Mary, 2013-4 Core Program, The Core Program, Museum of Fine Arts Houston. 7, 8–9, 35.

2010 Brown, Julia, Abbey Dubin, Till Gathmann, Elaine Reynolds, “A Survey for the Art Affiliated” in Anna Danera and Hans Haacke eds., Give and Take, Catalogue, Milan, Italy: Mousse Publishing

2006 “Coco Fusco at MC,” Afterall Journal. Ed. Thomas Lawson. 18 Oct. 2006.
