= Johannes Avetaranian =

Turkish sayyid, mullah, and Protestant missionary (1861–1919)

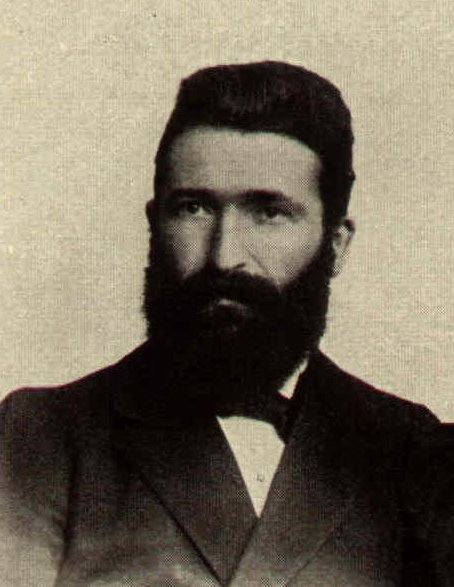
- Born: 30 June 1861; Erzurum, Ottoman Empire
- Died: 11 December 1919 (aged 58); Wiesbaden, Weimar Republic

Johannes Avetaranian, born Mehmet Şükri (Erzurum, Ottoman Empire, 30 June 1861 – Wiesbaden, Germany, 11 December 1919) was originally a mullah in Turkey who converted from Islam to Christianity, and later became a missionary for the Swedish Mission Covenant Church in Southern Xinjiang (1892–1938). He translated the New Testament into the Uyghur language. He preached Christianity in Xinjiang and at a Swedish Protestant mission. He died in 1919, aged 58, in Wiesbaden.

According to his autobiography, he claimed that he was a sayyid, meaning a direct descendant of the Islamic prophet Muhammad.

== Biography ==
Avetaranian was born in Erzurum, in 1861, to a Muslim family. His mother was deaf, blind, and mute, and died when Avetaranian was only two years old. His father was a dervish. According to his autobiography, he would have been allowed to wear the green turban reserved for sayyids by a mullah after his aunt showed him their family genealogy. It appears that he received a rather good education, allowing him to speak multiple languages. Apart from Turkish, other Turkic languages, and Arabic, he also spoke German, English, and possibly French and Swedish.

Avetaranian initially became a mullah in the Ottoman Empire but gradually turned towards Christianity after reading the Gospels, he was particularly shocked after the drowning execution of twelve Turkish students who had converted to Christianity in the 1880s in Constantinople. He then came into contact with Pastor Amirkhaniantz and some priests of the Armenian Apostolic Church.

He took the Armenian name of Johannes (John) Avetaranian (Avetaran means 'Gospel') and was baptised either in Tiflis, Russia (modern-day Tbilisi, Georgia) or in Tabriz, Iran, on 28 February 1885.

He was the first person from the Mission Union of Sweden to stay in Kashgar (in 1892). He translated the New Testament into the Uyghur language. Avetaranian was significant in the understanding of the Uyghur language and stands as one of the pioneers in the study of this language. His knowledge of Turkish enabled him to be a proficient translator of Christian religious texts in both Turkish and other Turkic languages, unlike his missionary colleagues, most of whom were proficient only in Greek and Hebrew. He also translated in Uyghur some books of the Old Testament, such as Job, Genesis, the Psalms and in Turkish The Pilgrim's Progress of John Bunyan.

He left Kashgar in 1897, thinking that he would soon return, but that did not work out. Instead he worked with the German Orient Mission (DOM) in Bulgaria, where he started a Christian newspaper, Gunesh, in Turkish. The newspaper was circulated in Turkey proper.

Gösta Raquette came to Philipopol, now Plovdiv, Bulgaria, where he worked with Avetaranian on revision of the Bible translation.

He died in 1919, aged 58, in Wiesbaden.
