= Josef Mässrur =

Christian Persian missionary

Josef Mässrur (Ghäsim Khan)
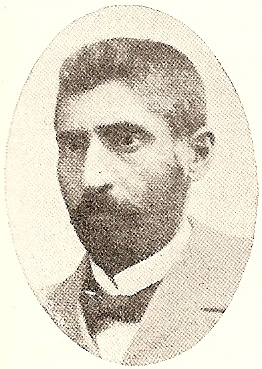
- Missionary to East Turkestan
- Born: Tehran, Persia
- Died: March 31, 1913
- Spouse: Anna Nyström

Josef Mässrur (born Ghäsim Khan) (also sometimes spelled Josef Messrur) was a Christian Persian missionary to Chinese Turkestan with the Mission Union of Sweden.

Mässrur was born in Tehran, Persia, of Persian parents. He studied medicine and French from a French doctor in Tehran. Afterwards, he set up an independent practice. While he was practising as a doctor a Lutheran Swedish missionary gave him a New Testament, and he soon made the decision to give his life to Jesus. He was baptised and took the name Josef.

In 1894 he joined the Mission Union of Sweden, and went to Xinjiang with Anna Nystrom to operate within the Covenant Church Östturkestanmission. On 5 May 1895, after arriving in Kashgar, he married Anna Nyström, whom he had met in Persia. They worked in Yarkand, where they founded the Mission League's mission station, and later built a hospital. Mässrur also trained to be a dentist.

In 1900 the Mässrurs travelled to Anna's homeland of Sweden. In 1901 they returned to Persia, an area where the Swedish Mission Covenant really had no mission. They were not officially missionaries of the Swedish Missionary Society, but Anna had a small contribution until 1908, when it was withdrawn. They never returned to Chinese Turkestan, but worked in Rasht and Tehran till his death.

Mässrur died on March 31, 1913. Anna Nystrom Mässrur returned to Stockholm, Sweden on 15 December 1913 but was so ill from the effects of a previous cholera epidemic that she was hospitalized upon her arrival. She died later that month.

== Bibliography ==
- J. Lundahl (editor), På obanade stigar: Tjugofem år i Ost-Turkestan. Stockholm, Svenska Missionsförbundet Förlag, 1917
- Nyström, Lennart, Anna och Mischa Josef - en missionshistoria
