= Gustaf Ahlbert =

Swedish missionary and linguist

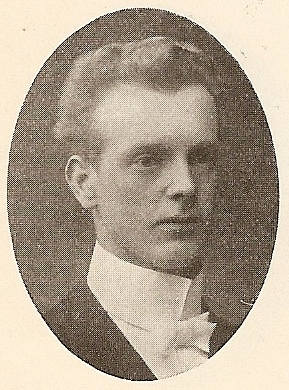
- Missionary to East Turkestan
- Born: 26 January 1884; Vetlanda, Småland, Sweden
- Died: 1943 (aged 58–59); Bombay, India

Gustaf Albert Ahlbert (26 January 1884 – 1943) was a Swedish missionary and linguist. He served with the Mission Union of Sweden in Chinese Turkestan (present day Xinjiang).

Ahlbert had a competent knowledge of Hebrew, Greek, Arabic and Uyghur.

He was one of the last three missionaries to be expelled from Kashgar in 1939. After he was expelled, he worked among Muslims in India, and worked together with Oskar Hermansson and Dr. Nur Luke on the Uyghur Bible translation, until his death in Bombay in 1943.

== Bibliography ==
- Gustaf Ahlbert, Bachta Chan eller Lyckobarnet, Stockholm, 1934
- Gustaf Ahlbert, Habil: En Kristen Martyr i Östturkestan, Stockholm,. (1934)
- Gustaf Ahlbert, Letter specimens. The manner of writing letters and documents in the six cities, Kashghar: Svenska Missionstryckeriet (1920)
- Gustaf Ahlbert, Spelling-book for the language of the Six Cities, Kashghar: Swedish Mission Press, (1929)
- Gustaf Ahlbert, östtur-kestansk flickas historia
- John Hultvall, Mission och revolution i Centralasien: Svenska Missionsförbundets mission i Östturkestan 1892 - 1938, Stockholm: Gummesson 1981.
- Rachel O. Wingate, The Steep Ascent: The Story of the Christian Church in Turkestan, British and Foreign Bible Society (1948?)

== See also ==
- Mission and Change in Eastern Turkestan (English Translation of select chapters of Mission och revolution i Centralasien)
