= Nils Fredrik Höijer =

Swedish Protestant missionary (1857–1925)

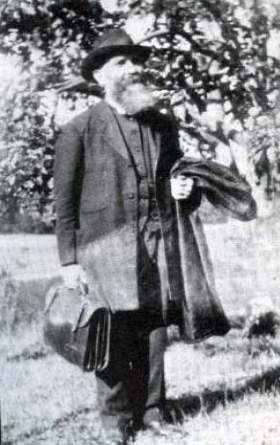
- Born: 1857; Svanskog, Värmland, Sweden
- Died: 20 November 1925 (aged 67–68); Seattle, Washington, United States

Nils Fredrik Höijer (1857 – 20 November 1925) was a Swedish missionary to Central Asia. In 1892 he accompanied Johannes Avetaranian to Kashgar. He did not however, stay in Kashgar.

In 1903, he founded Swedish Slavic Mission (today known as Ljus i Öster Light for the Peoples), a missionary organization that today has missionaries in works in the CIS, Eastern Europe, Turkey, Mongolia, and China.

== Bibliography ==
- Avateranian, Johannes & Bechard, John (tr); A Muslim Who Became A Christian (Hertford: Authors Online Ltd.)
- Ann-Charlotte Fritzon, Passion för det omöjliga Om pionjären Nils Fredrik Höijer Slaviska Missionen – Bromma Malmö 1993
- Ann-Charlotte Fritzon, Passion for the Impossible
