= Chinese Union Version =

Chinese translation of the Bible

- Full name: Chinese Union Version
- Other names: 和合本
- Abbreviation: CUV
- Language: Chinese
- OT published: 1919
- NT published: 1906
- Complete Bible published: 1919
- Authorship: Calvin Mateer et al.
- Derived from: English Revised Version
- Version revision: 1988 (CUVNP), 2006 (RCUV NT), 2010 (RCUV OT+NT)
- Publisher: China Christian Council or Hong Kong Bible Society (current)
- Copyright: Public domain (copyright expired)
- Religious affiliation: Protestant
- Genesis 1:1–3 起初，神創造天地。地是空虛混沌，淵面黑暗；神的靈運行在水面上。神說：「要有光」，就有了光。 John 3:16 神愛世人，甚至將他的獨生子賜給他們，叫一切信他的，不至滅亡，反得永生。

Chinese Union Version
- Chinese: 和合本
Transcriptions
Standard Mandarin
- Hanyu Pinyin: héhéběn
- Wade–Giles: ho^{2}-ho^{2}-pen^{3}
Yue: Cantonese
- Jyutping: wo4 hap6 bun2

The Chinese Union Version (CUV) (Chinese: 和合本; pinyin: héhéběn; lit. 'harmonized/united version') is the predominant translation of the Bible into Chinese used by Chinese Protestants, first published in 1919.

The CUV is currently available in both traditional (CUVT) and simplifed (CUVS) written Chinese, and is published in Hong Kong by the Hong Kong Bible Society, a Bible society affiliated with the United Bible Societies; in Taiwan by the Bible Society in Taiwan, also associated with the United Bible Societies; and in China by Amity Printing Co., Ltd., of the Amity Foundation in Nanjing, related to the China Christian Council and also affiliated with the United Bible Societies.

A revision for the CUV, the Revised Chinese Union Version (RCUV, 和合本修訂版; héhéběn xiūdìngbǎn), was completed for the New Testament in 2006, and for the entire Bible in 2010.

== History ==
The CUV was translated by a panel with members from many different Protestant denominations, using the English Revised Version as a basis and original-language manuscripts for crosschecking. Work on the CUV began in 1890 and originally, three versions of the CUV were planned—two classical Chinese versions and a vernacular Mandarin Chinese version. The CUV was completed in 1919, with one amalgamated classical Chinese translation and one vernacular Mandarin translation. With the onset of May Fourth Movement, and the associated New Culture Movement, the CUV is the second translated work to be published in Vernacular Mandarin Chinese, after the first vernacular Chinese Bible, the Peking Committee Bible.

The CUV in use today is the vernacular Mandarin Chinese version, published in two slightly different editions—the "Shen" Edition (神版) and the "Shangti" Edition (上帝版)—differing in the way the word "God" is translated. The vernacular Chinese language in the CUV has changed a lot since 1919 and its language is stilted for modern readers. Furthermore, many Chinese characters used in the CUV have fallen into disuse.

John 3:16. 神愛世人，甚至將他的獨生子賜給他們，叫一切信他的，不至滅亡，反得永生。(CUV 1919)

Work towards the revision for the CUV, the Revised Chinese Union Version (RCUV), started in the early 1980s. Its goal was to update the language of the CUV while keeping as much of the original translation as intact as possible, ultimately resulting in an update of 15% of the New Testament and 20% of the Old Testament. The revision to the New Testament was completed in 2006 (新約全書─和合本修訂版), and to the entire Bible in 2010. This version was consecrated on 27 September 2010 at St. John's Cathedral in Hong Kong.

== Typography ==
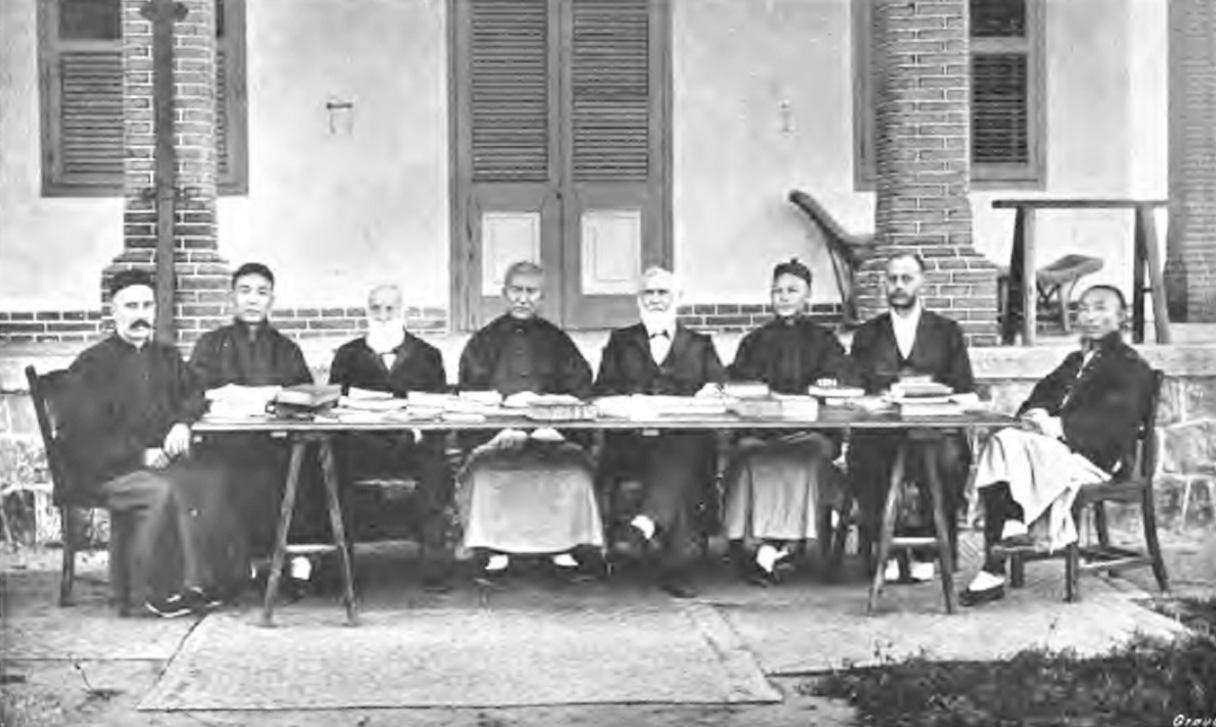
Frederick W. Baller, C. Goodrich, Calvin Wilson Mateer, Spencer Lewis, and George Sydney Owen each with expert Chinese language assistants

Text in the Chinese Union Version is typeset generally vertically from right to left, with some captions for illustrations typeset horizontally from left to right.

- The CUV employs old-style punctuation, setting most punctuation marks as if they were ruby. It uses the currently standard proper name mark only for personal names, but a punctuation mark that can be described as a "double proper name mark" is used for geographical names; both of these are typeset on the right-hand side, instead of the currently standard left. The book title mark is not used, and book titles are not marked in the CUV in any way. Chapter and section headings are typeset in sans serif type.
- Verse numbers are typeset on the right-hand side of the first word of each verse as ruby. They are also repeated in the margins.
- New paragraphs start after chapter and section headings. Within each section, however, paragraph breaks are indicated by the traditional Chinese pilcrow, a thin, sans-serif circle about the size of a Chinese character.
- In the Shen Edition of the CUV, a full-width space is added before each word "God" so that the paging between the Shen and Shangti editions are identical; this extra space is interpreted as the traditional honorific marker.
- Comments and notes are typeset as warichu. Additionally, an ad hoc punctuation mark that looks like a dashed underline is used to mark editorially inserted words; like the two varieties of the proper name mark, this mark is also typeset on the right-hand side.
- Typesetting the proper name mark on the right would have caused clashes with verse numbers and most punctuation marks. However, when clashes occur, the proper name and similar punctuation marks that cause the clash are partially truncated to avoid omitting any punctuation marks.

== Chinese Union Version with New Punctuation ==
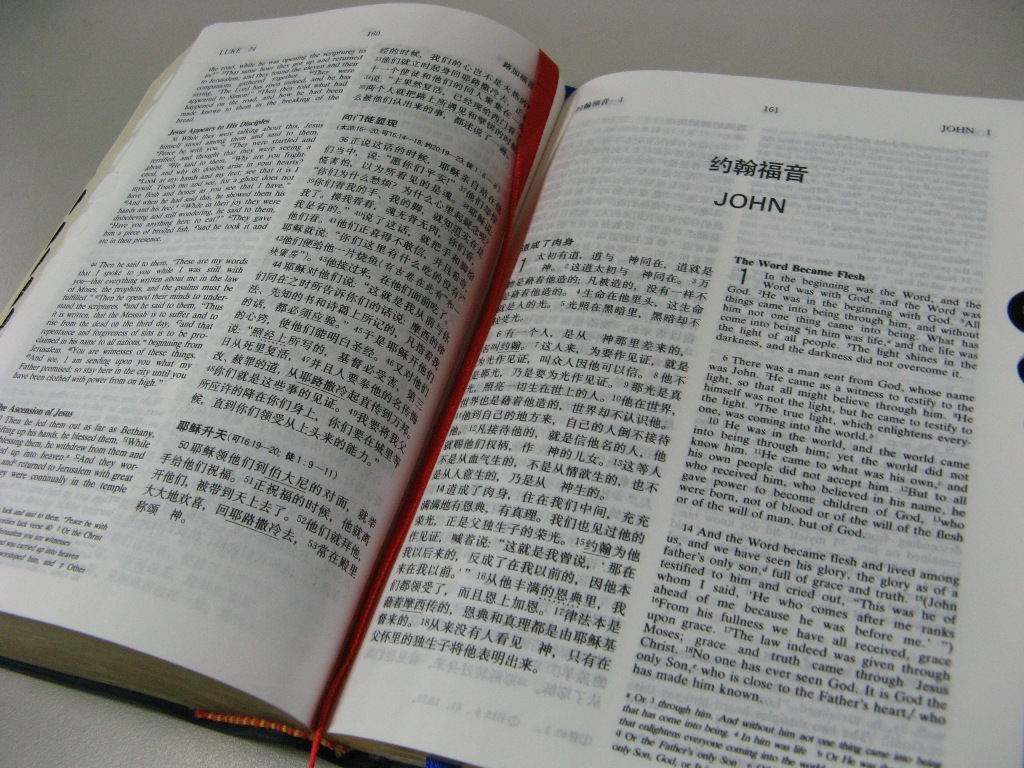
The English-Chinese Bible: New Revised Standard Version and Chinese Union Version with simplified Chinese characters (printed by Amity Printing Company and published by China Christian Council)

Because of the old-style and ad hoc punctuation, the CUV looks archaic and somewhat strange to the modern reader. The result of updating the CUV's punctuation in line with modern usage is the Chinese Union Version with New Punctuation (CUVNP or CUNP; simplified Chinese: 新标点和合本; traditional Chinese: 新標點和合本; pinyin: xīnbiāodiǎn héhéběn) which was published in 1988.

This edition with the Chinese characters written horizontally, printed by Amity Printing Company in Nanjing, and published by China Christian Council in Shanghai, constitutes the largest number of the Bibles in present-day China. Some wording and proper nouns (people's names and place names) have been changed from the 1919 version in order to adapt to the modern use of the Chinese language. A bilingual Chinese-English edition, the Chinese Union Version combined with the New Revised Standard Version, is also published by China Christian Council.

== See also ==
- Chinese Bible Translations
- Delegates' Version
- New Chinese Version
- Studium Biblicum Version
- Hong Kong Bible Society
- Revised Chinese Union Version of the Bible
- Chinese Union Version with New Punctuation
