= Anna Mässrur =

Swedish missionary

Anna Nyström-Mässrur
- Missionary to East Turkestan
- Born: 9 December 1849; Gåsinge, Södermanland, Sweden
- Died: December 1913 (aged 63–64)
- Spouse: Josef Mässrur

Anna Nyström-Mässrur (9 December 1849 – December 1913) was a Swedish missionary. She served in the Caucasus and in Persia, and in 1894 moved to the Xinjiang region of China.

She married Persian-born doctor Josef Mässrur in Kashgar in May 1895, and they worked together in Yarkand. They made many Uyghur friends, and Raquette writes that fifteen years later that they were well remembered by many Uyghurs.

The couple left in 1900 for a visit to Sweden, arriving there on 2 November of that year. In the autumn of 1901 they left Sweden, and returned to Persia, Josef's homeland, where Anna lived until just before her death, when she returned to Sweden. Her health had been weakened during a cholera epidemic in Persia in 1892. On arriving back in Sweden in December 1913, she was so weakened by her illness that she was immediately hospitalized, and died soon after.

== Bibliography ==
- J. Lundahl (editor), På obanade stigar: Tjugofem år i Ost-Turkestan. Stockholm, Svenska Missionsförbundet Förlag, 1917
