= Magnus Bäcklund =

Swedish missionary

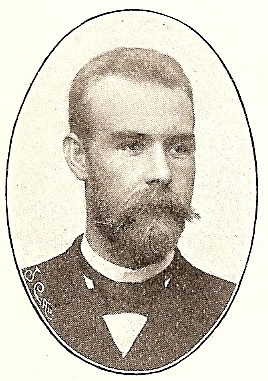
- Born: 12 December 1866; Alstakan, Värmland, Sweden
- Died: 26 June 1903 (aged 36); Kashgar, Great Qing

Magnus Bäcklund (12 December 1866 – 26 June 1903) was a Swedish missionary to Chinese Turkestan with the Mission Covenant Church of Sweden.

Magnus was born in Alstakan, Gunnarskog parish, Värmland. He grew up in a poor family and had to work hard. He found employment at Östlund & Almqvist in Arvika. He studied German, French, and Greek during this time.

In 1895, he travelled to Kashgar, but being delayed, he studied Uyghur in Bukhara, and only arrived in Kashgar June the following year, 1897. In Xinjiang, he worked at the Mission hospital.

On 26 June 1903 he died of typhoid fever, and was buried in Kashgar. He was 36 years old.

== Bibliography ==
- J. Lundahl (editor), På obanade stigar: Tjugofem år i Ost-Turkestan. Stockholm, Svenska Missionsförbundet Förlag, 1917
- E. John Larsson, Magnus Bäcklund: ett Guds sändebud i Centralasien, Kristinehamn: Värmland, 1914.
