= Nur Luke =

Uyghur Bible translator

Dr. Nur Luke
- نۇر لۇك
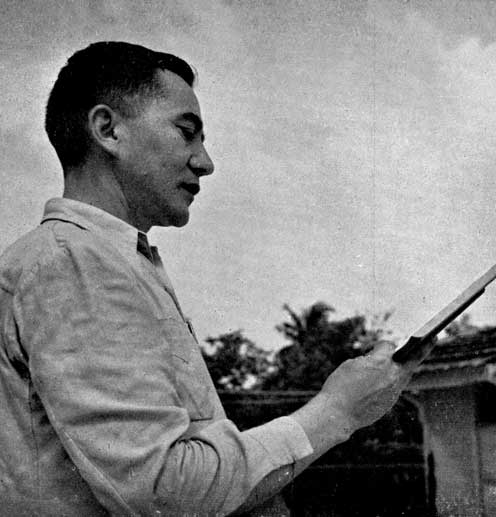
- Luke in 1953
- Born: Nur Muhammad; Khotan
- Years active: 1930s to 1950s
- Notable work: Translating the Bible to the Uyghur language

Nur Luke (Uyghur: نۇر لۇك) was a Uyghur scholar from Khotan who converted to Christianity and translated the Bible to his native Uyghur language.

A devout Protestant and believer in the Protestant work ethic, Luke vehemently opposed traditional marriage customs, arranged marriages, and child marriages, believing them to be the primary cause of gender inequality and high divorce rates amongst the local populace.

Luke fled Xinjiang and became a refugee in India sometime in the 1930s. He settled in Bombay where he In India he studied Persian, Arabic and Urdu as well as Islamic Theology. Afterwards he was also able to complete his lifelong dream of studying medicine and became a doctor.

His friend from Xinjiang introduced him to some of the Swedish missionaries who were now in Bombay and after conversations with them he converted to Christianity. He was baptised in 1941, when he changed his name to Nur Luke. He also began to work on a Uyghur translation of the Bible, together with the Swedish missionaries Gustaf Ahlbert and Oskar Hermannson. The first Uyghur-language Bible, authored by the trio, was published by the British and Foreign Bible Society in 1946.
