= Alimjan Yimit =

Uyghur clergyman

Alimjan Yimit (Chinese: 阿里木江 · 依米提; pinyin: Ālǐmùjiāng Yīmǐtí) is a Uyghur house church clergyman.

== History ==
The Kashi Municipal Bureau for Ethnic Religious Affairs ordered that Alimujiang's license to operate his business, Xinjiang Jiaerhao Foodstuff Company, be revoked on 13 September 2007 for "[using the business] as a cover to preach Christianity among people of Uyghur ethnicity".

Alimujiang was arrested on 12 January 2008 and sentenced to 15 years incarceration for allegedly instigating separatism and stealing, penetrating, purchasing and illegally providing state secrets to overseas organizations and individuals.

Those close to Alimujiang claim that there is no proof of wrongdoing and that agricultural workers such as Alimujiang do not have access to state secrets.

== Summary of events ==
The following train of events is chronicled by Open Doors, a non-denominational Christian organization dedicated to raising awareness of global persecution of Christians.

1. Alimjan had a business, the Xinjiang Jiaerhao Foodstuff Company Ltd. Because of Alimjan's association with two foreign-owned companies, officials from the State Security Bureau often called him in for interrogations. His house began to be searched and his personal computer was seized. Alimjan also complained that he had been physically abused to the bureau's headquarters in Ürümqi. His complaint was not addressed.
2. On 13 September 2007, the authorities closed down Alimjan's business and accused him of using it as a front for "preaching Christianity among people of Uyghur."
3. On 12 January 2008, Alimjan was arrested on a so-called national security issue, and held at Kashgar Detention Centre.
4. Alimjan was threatened with a range possible sentences, from six years in prison to execution.
5. According to his lawyer, conditions in detention have been so harsh that it has affected Alimjan's health. It has also been reported that he was much respected in the Detention Centre.
6. On 20 February 2008, charges against Alimjan were changed to 'inciting secessionist sentiment to split the country', and 'collecting and selling intelligence for overseas organizations'. The question of how an agricultural worker such as Alimjan could have had access to classified information has still not been addressed.
7. At a hearing on 27 May 2008, the Xinjiang Court cited 'insufficient evidence' as reason for returning the case to state prosecutors.
8. On 12 September 2008, the UN Working Group on Arbitrary Detention, in its Opinion 29/2008, ruled that the arrest and detention of Alimjan was arbitrary and in violation of international law. The Working Group concluded that Alimjan was detained because of his faith and requested that the government correct the situation.
9. In September 2008 Public Security Bureau officials returned the case to State prosecutors.
10. In October 2008 State Prosecutors sent the case back to the court.
11. On 28 July 2009, Alimjan was tried secretly at Kashi District Intermediate People's Court in Xinjiang for 'collecting and selling intelligence for overseas organisations'. This was Alimjan's first hearing since being detained for a year and a half and is contrary to China criminal law.
12. On 27 October 2009, according to CAA, Alimjan was read his verdict. He was sentenced to 15 years in prison. Mr. Li Dunyong, one of Alimjan's lawyers, subsequently lodged an appeal.
13. On 16 March 2010 the People's High Court upheld the original verdict. According to CAA, Alimjan's lawyers, Li Baiguang and Liu Peifu, appealed to the Beijing Supreme Court, but after reconsidering his case, they ruled to uphold the sentence of 15 years of imprisonment.
14. Dunyong was among the lawyers who did not get the annual renewal of his bar registration in May 2009. Another lawyer who defended Alimjan also lost his license when Chinese authorities turned down his annual application for renewal. Dunyong said that "The key for this case was the flawed Certificate for the Evidence," verified by the Bureau of Conservative Secrets. According to Dunyong, in both form and content the certificate was questionable. Furthermore, it had no signature by the verifier at the Bureau, contrary to Chinese law.
15. Dunyong confirmed that "religion lies at the heart of this case." Friends of Alimjan also said they believe the true reason for his arrest is his faith.

== See also ==
- Freedom of religion in China
