= Revised Chinese Union Version of the Bible =

Chinese translation of the Bible

- Language: Chinese
- OT published: 2010
- NT published: 2006
- Complete Bible published: 2010
- Derived from: Chinese Union Version
- Translation type: Literal translation
- Publisher: Hong Kong Bible Society
- Genesis 1:1–3 起初，神創造天地。地是空虛混沌，深淵上面一片黑暗；神的靈運行在水面上。神說：「要有光」，就有了光。 John 3:16 神愛世人，甚至將他獨一的兒子賜給他們，叫一切信他的人不致滅亡，反得永生。

Revised Chinese Union Version of the Bible
- Traditional Chinese: 聖經和合本修訂版
- Simplified Chinese: 圣经和合本修订版
Transcriptions
Standard Mandarin
- Hanyu Pinyin: Shèngjīng Héhéběn Xiūdìngbǎn
Yue: Cantonese
- Jyutping: sing3 ging1 wo4 hap6 bun2 sau1 ding3 baan2

The Revised Chinese Union Version of the Bible, or the Revised Chinese Union Version (RCUV) in shorter forms, is a modern update of the Chinese Union Version published in 1919. The revision was completed by more than 30 Chinese Bible scholars from China mainland, Hong Kong, Taiwan, Malaysia, and Singapore over a period of about 30 years. And the entire Old and New Testaments were published in 2010. This revision adheres to the principles of being faithful to the original texts and maintaining the style of the Union Version, as well as using modern Chinese expressions.

== Background ==
The Chinese Union Version of the Bible was published by the United Bible Societies in 1919. After nearly a hundred years, it has become the most widely used Bible translation in Chinese Christian churches. However, with the changes of the times, some Chinese vocabulary and grammar have undergone great changes. Some words used in the Union Version are now rare words, and the meanings of some words have also changed. Some terms that were smooth at that time are now difficult to understand. Furthermore, biblical archaeology has seen numerous advances in recent decades, such as the discovery of the Dead Sea Scrolls and the research of the Septuagint. This has led to new advances in the interpretation of biblical variant texts and the understanding of ancient manuscripts and translations. Therefore, retranslating the Bible or revising existing translations is particularly necessary.

However, considering that the Union Version adheres to the principles of faithfulness, expressiveness, and elegance, its elegant and graceful translation has been widely circulated and has had a profound influence in the Chinese church. Since its publication, many new Chinese translations have appeared, but none have been able to dislodge its prestige. Therefore the United Bible Societies considered revising the Union Version with modern Chinese language, making as few changes as possible and striving to retain the advantages of the original translation.

== Revision principles and examples ==
This revision followed the following principles:

(1) Be faithful to the original text: For example, in the Union Version of Matthew 5:3, "虛心的人有福了，因為天國是他們的 (Blessed are the poor in spirit, for theirs is the kingdom of heaven)," the sentence was originally accompanied by a double-line footnote at the end in early versions (such as a New Testament published in 1913): "虛心，原文作心裏貧窮 (Poor in spirit, originally meant poor in heart)" . This footnote was deleted in the final version. In the revised Union Version, this verse is changed to "心靈貧窮的人有福了！因為天國是他們的 (Blessed are the poor in heart, for theirs is the kingdom of heaven)."

(2) Make minimal changes. Not to make amendments for the sake of changes: For example, During the revision of the Union Version, the Nestle-Aland (Note: The revision of the New Testament in the Revised Union Version is based on the text of The Greek New Testament (4th edition, 1993) (published by the German Bible Society on behalf of the United Bible Societies).) (Note: Currently popular Greek versions, such as The Greek New Testament, fourth edition, published by the United Bible Societies, are based on the Nestle-Aland Greek New Testament (Novum Testamentum Graece), edited by Kurt Aland and Barbara Aland of the Institute for New Testament Textual Research in Germany and published by the Deutsche Bibelgesellschaft.) Greek New Testament, which it uses, did not include Mark 16:9-20 and John 7:53 to 8:11. Therefore, the revised version retained these two passages, but informed the reader in the text or in a footnote that they were derived from later ancient manuscripts. Revisions were only made where the text clearly deviated from the original. For example, in John 3:16, the famous phrase "獨生子" (the only begotten Son) was changed to "獨一的兒子" (the only Son). This was because the original text meant "unique and only" and did not contain the word "begotten." Even the original text of the Union Version did not contain the word "begotten," so the revision was necessary.

(3) Strives to maintain the style of the Union Version, preserves as many golden sentences as possible, so that parents can share their favorite scriptures with their children and grandchildren. For example, the Lord's Prayer in Matthew 6:13, "For thine is the kingdom, and the power, and the glory, forever. Amen!", is not found in ancient manuscripts and may have been copied in later times. However, since this verse is familiar and memorized by believers, and since the revised version is a revision of the old translation, it was not appropriate to make significant changes, so it was retained.

(4) Use expressions of modern Chinese language: For example, the term "教訓" (teaching), often used in the Union Version, now has a distinctly negative connotation. The revised version uses "教導" (teaching), which is more in line with modern usage. The word "遊行" (parade) has also evolved in meaning, now mostly referring to protesters walking in the streets, which carries a negative connotation. The revised version uses "周遊" (wandering) or "散步" (walking) as a more appropriate term. Furthermore, some terms in the Union Version are from other religions, such as "作孽" (do evil), a Buddhist term. Therefore, the revised version changed it to "作惡" (do evil).

== Original versions used in the revision ==
The revised version makes reference to the following original versions:

- Old Testament: the Hebrew version of Masoretic Text, or the Biblia Hebraica Stuttgartensia, 5th Edition, published by the German Bible Society in 1997.
- New Testament: Greek New Testament, 4th Revised Edition, published by the United Bible Societies in 1993.
- During the revision process, references were also made to the Dead Sea Scrolls, the Septuagint, the Samaritan Pentateuch, the Vulgate, the Syriac Version, the Targum, etc.

== Publication Work ==
=== Publishing Process ===
In 1983, the United Bible Societies held seminars in Hong Kong, Taiwan, Singapore and other places on the revision of the Union Version. Most of the participants believed that it was necessary to carry out the revision work. And there was strong support from the China Christian Council (TSPM/CCC).

In 1984, the United Bible Society established a Union Version Revision Committee to begin the revision work. In 1985, the revision project was formally started. The revision team include scholars from China mainland (with scholars from the China Christian Council), Hong Kong, Taiwan, Malaysia, the Philippines, Singapore, Australia, Europe and the Americas.

In 2000, the revision project was handed over to Hong Kong Bible Society.

In 2006, the entire revised New Testament was published.

In 2010, the entire Bible, including the Old and New Testaments. was published.

On 27 September 2010, the Hong Kong Bible Society held a dedication ceremony for the Revised Union Version of the Holy Bible. The then Chief Executive of the Hong Kong Special Administrative Region, Donald Tsang, and Archbishop Paul Kwong of the Hong Kong Sheng Kung Hui presided over the ceremony.

=== Layout Features ===
Each chapter has subsections and paragraph headings; if there are other scriptures for reference in the paragraph, a footnote is added. For poetic scriptures, the sentences are accurately punctuated and arranged in lines according to the poetic style. For scriptures with critical comments, they are noted in square brackets in the text and the critical comments are stated in the footnotes.

There is an introduction before each volume, which describes the writing background, author and summary of the scriptures in that volume.

The book is accompanied by colour maps provided by the German Bible Society, including "Palestine in the Old Testament," "Palestine in the New Testament," "Ancient Near East (Old Testament)," and "Paul's Ministry and Journey to Rome," all of which are marked with topography and coordinate lines and come with indexes. The black and white maps include "The Ancient World," "Egypt and Sinai," "The Divisions of Canaan," "The United Kingdom of Israel," "Jerusalem in the Old Testament," "The Assyrian Empire," "Palestine in the Time of Jesus," "Palestine and Syria," "Paul's First Missionary Journey," "Paul's Second Missionary Journey", "Paul's Third Missionary Journey," and "Jerusalem in the New Testament," to help readers understand the geographical overview.

The revised chapters account for about 15% to 20% of the entire Bible. There are 496 footnotes in the revised New Testament, an increase of 60% from the CUV; 2014 footnotes in the Old Testament, almost threefold of the number in the CUV. There are appendices at the end of the book, including "Revised Table of Names of People and Places," "Table of Weights and Measures," and "Glossary Notes."

== See also ==
- Hong Kong Bible Society
- Chinese Union Version
- Chinese Bible Translations
- List of Chinese Bible translations
