= Stina Mårtensson =

- Born: 3 June 1882; Ovanåker, Hälsingland, Sweden
- Died: 1962 (aged 79–80); Sweden

Stina Mårtensson (3 June 1882 – 1962) was a Swedish missionary. She served with the Swedish Missionary Society in Chinese Turkestan (present day Xinjiang) and India.

Mårtensson was born in Ovanåker in Hälsingland, Sweden. She worked as a nurse midwife in Yarkand and Kashgar for more than 22 years in various periods during the years 1907–1936. In the 1930s, she worked with other missionaries to offer vocational training in farmwork.

From 1939 until 1946 she worked in India. She died in Sweden in 1962 at the age of 80.

== See also ==
- Mission and Change in Eastern Turkestan (English Translation of select chapters of Mission och revolution i Centralasien)
- Margareta Hook Homepage (archived ~2012) has some pictures.
- Missionskyrkan 2003 contains article that mentions her
