= Albert Andersson (missionary) =

Swedish missionary (1865–1915)

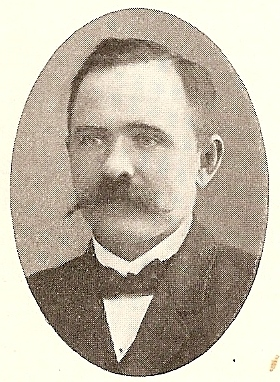
- Missionary to East Turkestan
- Born: February 8, 1865; Rasberg Parish, Skaraborg County
- Died: March 11, 1915 (aged 50)
- Spouse: Maria Lovisa Andersson nee Mattsson

Albert Andersson (8 February 1865 – 11 March 1915) was a Swedish missionary to Chinese Turkestan (modern day Xinjiang) with the Mission Covenant Church of Sweden. He also worked in Northern China with the Fransonska Mission.

== Early life ==
He was born in Rasberg Parish, Skaraborg County, Sweden. After studying from 1887-88 at the Mission Covenant Church of Sweden's school in Kristinehamn. He then preached at Sköfde, till he got an invitation from the Fransonska Mission to work in Northern China, where he went on January 12, 1893. In 1895 he married Maria Lovisa Mattsson. He returned to Sweden on October 10, 1898.

== Mission in China ==
At this time the Swedish missionaries in Xinjiang, who worked mainly with the Muslim Uyghur people, were looking for somebody who had already been in China proper, and who knew some Chinese to join the team and work with the Chinese people.

Andersson resigned from the Fransonska Mission, and joined to Mission Covenant Church of Sweden. On his way to Xinjiang he and his party were delayed for a time in Russian Turkestan because of the Boxer Rebellion. In Kashgar, in 1902 he and Maria lost their ten-month-old daughter, Mia. After three years he returned to Sweden for rest on May 24, 1906.

His poor health was already noticeable on September 24, 1907, but he returned to Xinjiang, nobody thinking that this was the beginning of the end. In Kashgar, in 1910 Maria and Albert lost their six-year-old son, Göte.

== Later life ==
In September 1911 his health forced him to return to Sweden, where after various doctors checked him out it became certain that his days were numbered.

He lived, however, another 4 years, and died on March 11, 1915.

== Bibliography ==
- J. Lundahl (editor), På obanade stigar: Tjugofem år i Ost-Turkestan. Stockholm, Svenska Missionsförbundet Förlag, 1917
