= Gösta Raquette =

Gustaf Rikard Raquette
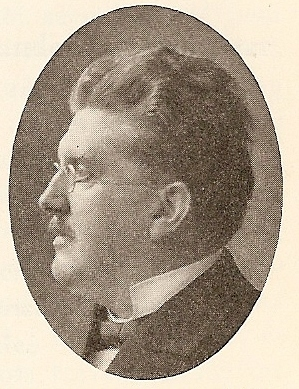
- Missionary to East Turkestan
- Born: 7 February 1871
- Died: 1945 (aged 73–74)
- Spouse: Evelina Elisabet Björkgren

Gustaf Rikard Raquette (Note: also spelled Gustav) (7 February 1871 – 1945) was a missionary with the Mission Covenant Church of Sweden to Central Asia.

Raquette was born on 7 February 1871 in Tolfta Parish, Uppsala County.

He served as a medical missionary in Baku and Buchara from 1895 to 1896, Kashgar from 1896 to 1901, Yarkand from 1904 to 1911 and once more in Kashgar from 1913 to 1921, then he returned to Sweden via Tibet and India.

Raquette married Evelina Elisabet Björkgren on 16 May 1896.

After he returned to Sweden, and took up a lectureship at the University of Lund. Gunnar Jarring is one of his most well known pupils from his time teaching at the university.

== Bibliography ==
- Raquette, Gustaf, A contribution to the existing knowledge of the Eastern-Turkestan dialect as it is spoken and written at the present time in the districts of Yarkand and Kashgar, Helsingfors 1909.
- Raquette, Gustaf, Eastern Turki grammar: practical and theoretical with vocabulary Part I and II, Stockholm, 1912–1914.
- Raquette, Gustaf, Eastern Turki grammar: practical and theoretical with vocabulary Part I and II, Stockholm, 1912–1914.
- Raquette, Gustaf, Eastern Turki grammar: practical and theoretical with vocabulary Part III, Stockholm, 1912–1914.
- Raquette, G., The accent problem in Turkish, Lund, 1927.
- Raquette, Gustaf, English-Turki dictionary based on the dialects of Kaschgar and Yarkand, Lund 1927.
- Raquette, Gustaf, Täji bilä Zohra: Eine osttürkische Variante der Sage von Tahir und Zohra, Lund 1930.
- Raquette, G., "Collection of Manuscripts from Eastern Turkestan. An Account of the Contents", särtryck ur C. G. Mannerheim, Across Asia from West to East 1906-08, Helsingfors 1940.
- Raquette, Gustaf, Kaschgarische wakf-urkunde aus der Khodscha-zeit Ost-Turkestans, 1930.
- Raquette, G., Simplified Christian Doctrines for Muslims, Kashgar.
- Raquette, G., Gustaf Raquette and Qasim Akhun's letters to Kamil efendi: ethnological and folkloristic materials from southern Sinkiang.
