= Foot Emancipation Society =

Chinese organization opposed to foot binding

The Foot Emancipation Society (Chinese: 不缠足会; pinyin: Bù chánzú huì), or Anti-footbinding Society (戒缠足会; Jiè chánzú huì), was a civil organization which opposed foot binding in late Qing dynasty China. It was affected by the Hundred Days' Reform of 1898, and this organization advanced the feminist movement in China.

== Background ==
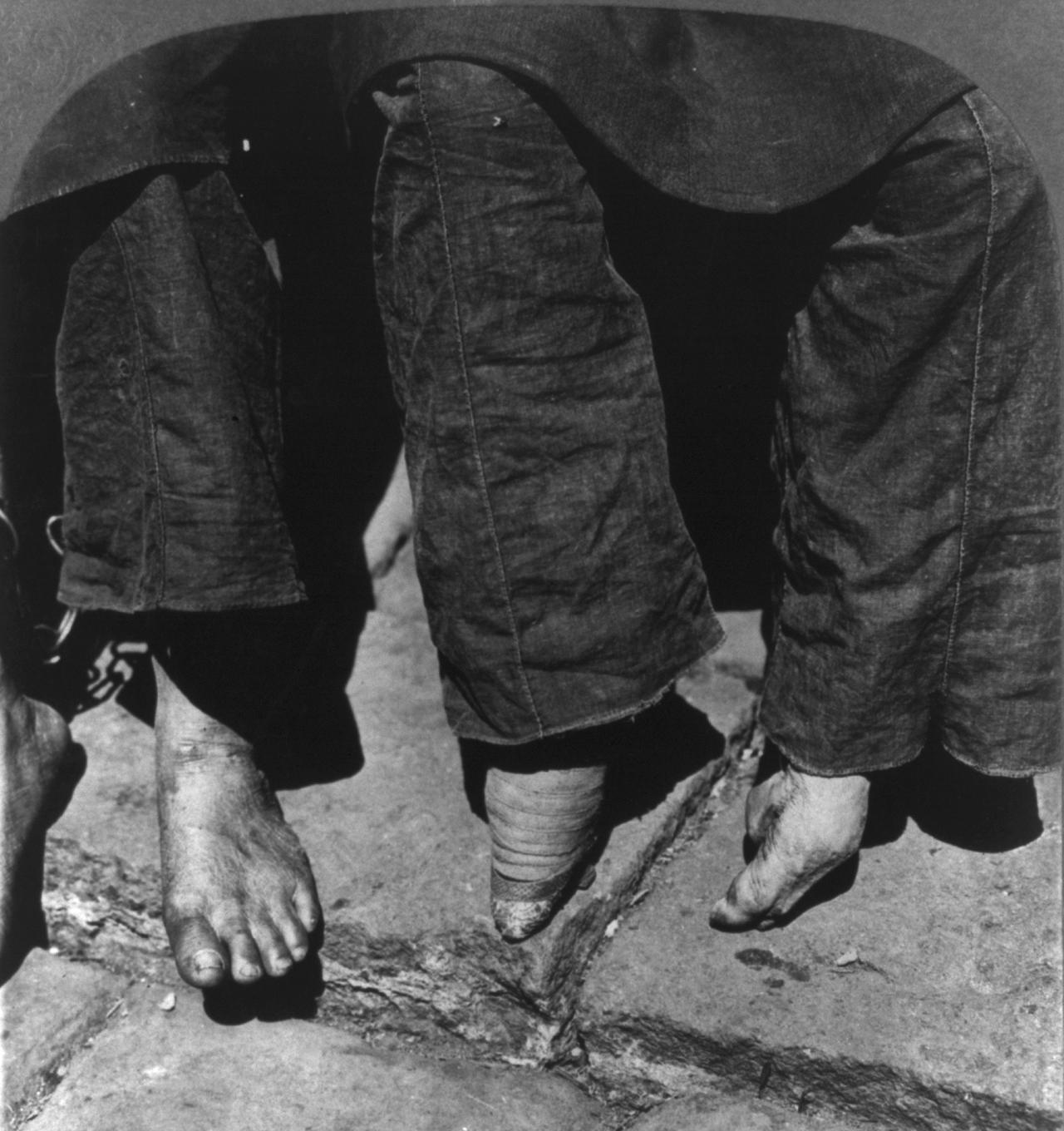
A comparison between a woman with normal feet (left) and a woman with bound feet in 1902

Foot binding was a custom practiced on young girls and women for approximately one thousand years in China, beginning in the 10th century. In Chinese society, bound feet were considered beautiful and erotic. The practice also limited women's mobility and was sometimes seen as a mark of status (the woman did not have to work) or a mark of male ownership (the woman's mobility was limited and she was intensely dependent on the males in her household).

In 1842, after the First Opium War, China signed the Treaty of Nanking with Britain, which forced the Qing government to open the five ports. More Christians came to China and began to oppose foot binding, because they thought it was discriminatory against women. In 1875, 60-70 Christian women in Xiamen attended a meeting presided by a missionary John MacGowan formed the Natural Foot Society (Tianzu Hui, literally Heavenly Foot Society), and it was championed by the Woman's Christian Temperance Movement founded in 1883 and advocated by missionaries including Timothy Richard, who thought that Christianity could promote equality between the sexes. The writings of Richard would influence Chinese reformers Kang Youwei and Liang Qichao who then challenged the practice of footbinding.

== Founding ==
The Hundred Days' Reform of 1898 stimulated many social reform activities. The widest-ranging movement was the "anti-footbinding movement", which generated the founding of the Foot Emancipation Society.

In 1887, Kang Youwei and Qu Eliang established the Foot Emancipation Society in the Nanhai District, of Foshan City; however, it was abandoned due to public opposition. In 1895, Kang Youwei and his brother Kang Guangrou (康广仁) established the Canton Foot Emancipation Society. He asked his daughters Kang Tongwei and Kang Tongbi to release their feet as examples. This movement began to impact the culture in Guangdong. In late 1896, Wu Xinggang (吴性刚) founded the Anti-Footbinding Society in Hunan province.

After 1897, the anti-footbinding movement developed rapidly. In the Shunde District of Foshan City, more than one hundred people attended the anti-footbinding movement. Liang Qichao (梁启超) wrote an article called "Report of Anti-footbinding" (《戒缠足会叙》). On June 30, the Shanghai Foot Emancipation Society was established. It impacted related organizations in Fuzhou, Tianjin, and Macau. In 1897, Chen Baoyi (陈保彝) announced the establishment of the Foot Emancipation Society in Changsha. The next year, Tan Sitong and Tang Caichang began the Hunan Foot Emancipation Society. The membership of anti-footbinding societies was claimed to have reached 300,000.

These activities may have been restricted by the districts during this period. The movement was also limited to the more knowledgeable citizens. After the failure of the Hundred Days' Reform, the anti-foot binding movement ended and foot binding continued to be widely practiced.

== Second phase ==
During the Gengzi Reform (清末新政, 庚子新政), anti-footbinding activities resumed. In 1902, Empress Dowager Cixi announced a ban on foot-binding to appease foreigners, but it was rescinded a short time later. In 1905, the Natural Feet Society (天足会) was established and largely impacted this movement. This movement gained the support of a number of provincial governors. Sichuan Governor Cen Chunxuan printed 50,000 books in support of the movement; Zhili Governor Cen Chunxuan, Huguang Governor Duanfang also wrote anti-footbinding articles. In 1904, foot binding was outlawed in many provinces, and some governmental officers asked their wives or daughters to release their bound feet.

In 1912, after the fall of the Qing dynasty, the new Republic of China government banned foot binding. Women were told to unwrap their feet lest they be killed. Societies were founded to support the abolition of foot-binding, with contractual agreements made between families who would promise an infant son in marriage to an infant daughter who did not have bound feet. When the Communists took power in 1949, they were able to enforce a strict prohibition on foot-binding, including in isolated areas deep in the countryside where the Nationalist prohibition had been ignored. The prohibition on foot-binding remains in effect today.
