= Kang Tongbi =

Chinese reformer and political figure (1887–1969)

- Chinese: 康同璧
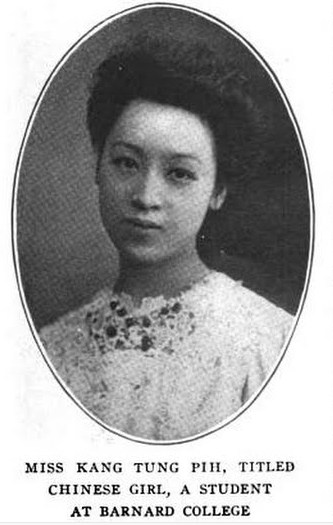
- Born: 1887; Qing Dynasty
- Died: 17 August 1969 (aged 86); Beijing, People's Republic of China
- Other name: Kang Tung Pih
- Education: Barnard College
- Occupations: Women's rights and reform activist
- Known for: Elimination of foot-binding for women in China
- Spouse: Lo Chang 罗昌
- Children: Lo Jung-pang 罗荣邦; Lo Yi-feng 罗仪凤
- Parents: Kang Youwei (father); Zhang Yunchu (mother)

Kang Tongbi (Chinese: 康同璧; pinyin: Kāng Tóngbì; 1887–1969), also romanized as Kang Tung Pih, was the daughter of Kang Youwei, a Chinese reformer and political figure of the late Qing dynasty and early Republican era.

== Early life ==
In 1880, Kang was born in Southern China. Official documents in the US indicate that her birth was on February 5, 1888, using the Gregorian calendar.

Kang's father was Kang Youwei. Kang was the second daughter of Zhang Yunchu, Kang Youwei's first wife. Kang's family was relatively wealthy in traditional China, and Kang's father kept several wives and concubines.

Kang Youwei, along with his disciple Liang Qichao, was one of the major intellectual figures behind the launching of China's political reform by the Guangxu Emperor in 1898, but political infighting at the Qing court caused the reform movement to be summarily aborted within 103 days of its start and a death warrant to be issued against Kang Youwei. He hastily left the country with his family and would spend the next 14 years travelling the world. As a result, much of Kang Tongbi's youth was spent abroad.

Kang's father was a noted calligrapher who taught her traditional Chinese painting and calligraphy. A few of Kang Tongbi's own paintings survive.

In 1903, Kang lived in Japan. In August 1903, Kang lived in the United States.

Kang graduated from Hartford Public High School, the second oldest public secondary school in the United States.

== Education ==
Kang attended Radcliffe College in Cambridge, Massachusetts and then Trinity College in Hartford, Connecticut. In 1907, Kang became the first Asian student to be enrolled at Barnard College. In 1909, Kang earned an associate degree in Journalism from Barnard College in Manhattan.

== Activities in China ==
Little information is available in English on Kang's life after she left Barnard College, but it is known that after the fall of the Qing dynasty in 1911, she returned to China, where she continued to agitate for feminist causes. She was deeply involved in the women's movement in Shanghai, advocating women's rights through meetings and speeches.

Kang was an editor and major contributor to Nüxuebao (Women's Education), one of the first women's journals in China. After the journal folded, Kang continued to crusade for women's rights. Like her father, she took a stand against the practice of foot-binding, establishing and co-leading a Tianzuhui (Natural Feet Society) with other Chinese feminists that served as a base of operations for their activities. She was part of the effort to organize the various Shanghai women's groups into a united Shanghai Women's Association, which petitioned the Nationalist government in Nanjing for a new constitution under the slogan, "Down with the warlords and up with equality between men and women". Kang Tongbi is also remembered for her biography of Kang Youwei, published in 1958.

== Personal life ==
Kang's husband was Luo Chang, a young staffer at the Chinese embassy in Tokyo, Japan.

There is no indication of the match having been arranged by their respective families, as was usually the case among upper-class Chinese at the time. Tongbi followed her husband when the latter was assigned to the Chinese consulate in Denmark, and later moved on to the United States where her father was already residing.

In 1909, at age twenty-one, Kang gave birth to a daughter, Luo Yifeng. Kang had two children.

In 1911, Kang returned to China. Kang lived in mainland China after the communist revolution in China in 1949. Kang was humiliated by the red guards and her daughter Luo Yifeng jailed during the Cultural Revolution. On August 17, 1969, Kang died in China.

== Gallery ==
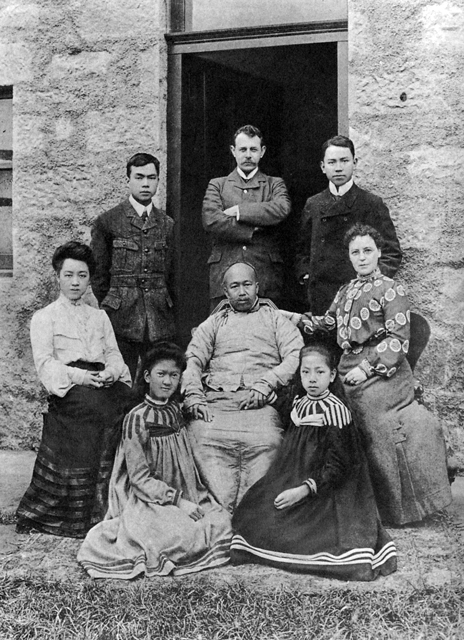
1907 Kang in group picture with her father and others

== In popular culture ==
Science-fiction writer Kim Stanley Robinson depicted a character named Kang Tongbi in his counterfactual novel The Years of Rice and Salt, a speculation on how world history might have turned out if Western Civilization had been wiped out by the plague epidemic of the 14th century, but it is not known whether the reference is deliberate.

== Additional sources ==
- Lo, Jung-Pang. K’ang Yu-Wei: A Biography and a Symposium. Tucson, AZ: The University of Arizona Press, 1967.
