= Gongche Shangshu movement =

1895 Qing scholars' reform petition

- Traditional Chinese: 公車上書
- Simplified Chinese: 公车上书
Transcriptions
Standard Mandarin
- Hanyu Pinyin: Gōngchē Shàngshū
- Wade–Giles: Kung1-ch'e1 Shang4-shu1

The Gongche Shangshu movement (traditional Chinese: 公車上書; simplified Chinese: 公车上书; pinyin: Gōngchē Shàngshū), or Petition of the Examination Candidates, also known as the Scholar's Petition to the Throne, was a political movement in China during the late Qing dynasty, seeking reforms and expressing opposition to the Treaty of Shimonoseki in 1895. It is considered the first modern political movement in China. Leaders of the movement later became leaders of the Hundred Days' Reform.

== Events ==
In 1895, China was defeated by Japan in the First Sino-Japanese War and was forced to sign the Treaty of Shimonoseki, which ceded Taiwan and Liaodong to Japan in perpetuity, and imposed reparation obligations of 200 million taels of silver on China. At the time, the imperial civil service examination was in progress in Beijing. When news reached the candidates, they became agitated, especially candidates from Taiwan whose province was about to become Japanese.

Five days after the signature of the treaty, on April 22, civil examination candidates led by Kang Youwei signed a ten-thousand-word petition to the Emperor, against the Treaty of Shimonoseki. The petition had 5 main points:

- Cancellation of the Treaty of Shimonoseki
- Refusal of peace talks with Japan
- Movement of the capital to Xi'an
- Modernization of Qing Imperial Army
- Implementation of Reforms

After the Qing Government refused, on May 2, thousands of Beijing scholars and citizens protested against the Treaty of Shimonoseki in front of the Ducha Yuan.

== Name ==
The name of this incident, Gongche Shangshu, literally means "Public Vehicle Petition". Gongche, or "Public Vehicle", was a poetic name for civil service candidates from various provinces, and is an allusion to the practice in the Han dynasty where candidates would be transported to the capital by publicly funded transport.

== Legacy ==
Although the movement was unsuccessful in asking the Qing Government to start reforms, many people in the traditional Chinese community began to realise the importance of reforms. Leaders of the movement such as Kang Youwei, Liang Qichao, Tan Sitong and Yan Fu started publishing newspapers in Beijing, Shanghai, and other cities, thus raising the attention of the emperor, who later invited them to enter the government to implement reforms. Although both the movement and later the reforms in 1898 failed, many scholars in big cities turned from supporting the traditional thinking to support reforms or revolution.
