= Alicia Little =

Writer and campaigner against the practice of foot binding

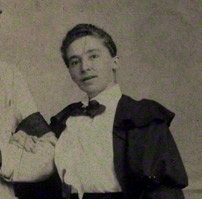
- Alicia Little
- Born: Alicia Ellen Neve Bewicke; 1845; Madeira, Portugal
- Died: 31 July 1926 (aged 80–81); Kensington, London, England

Alicia Little or Mrs Archibald Little (1845 – 31 July 1926) was a British writer and a campaigner for women's rights and later against foot binding in China.

== Life ==
Little was born as Alicia Ellen Neve Bewicke in the Madeira islands of Portugal in 1845 to Calverley and Amelia Jane Bewicke. Her parents owned Hallaton Hall in Leicestershire but she was brought up in Madeira. She returned to England and successfully published her first tranche of books. She travelled abroad but she was based in England until 1886.

She campaigned in 1885 when she published a novel called Mother Darling, which highlighted the poor status of women's rights in British marital law. At the time a man might not only exclude an estranged wife not only from "his" property but also access to their children. This was alleviated by the Married Women's Property Act 1893.

She married Archibald John Little and called herself "Mrs Archibald Little" in 1887. They went to live in Chongqing where she was seen as an oddity. Women did not go out in public as she wanted to so she had to spend time challenging expectations. The couple had been refused permission to build a holiday home by a magistrate who feared a public backlash. The magistrate arranged for them to stay at a farm in the hills near the Yangtze River as they avoided the summer heat at their home in Chongqing. Whilst they were there they were robbed and Little explains how she had to cope without a mirror, tablecloths and the time - as their watches had been stolen. Both of them travelled around China, although Little had to dress as a male to avoid attracting attention, which had on occasion resulted in items being thrown.

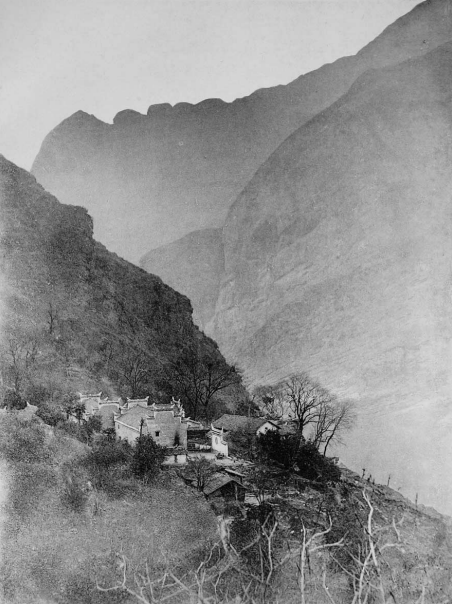
Country House on the Yangtze by Kazumasa Ogawa, as it appears in Little's book

Little kept a diary during 1893–1894 which she prepared for publication. In 1894, she met the photographic printer Kazumasa Ogawa whilst they were visiting Japan. The diary became the basis of a well bound book. Ogawa supplied photographs and it was published as My Diary in a Chinese Farm. The book described her stay on the farm near the Yangtze River.

Little was one of the most active campaigners in the anti-foot binding movement. She was the leading European campaigner from 1896 to 1906 against this practice. In 1898 she founded Tien Tsu Hui (Natural Foot Society) which campaigned against the Chinese custom of binding the feet of girls and women. The organisation initially took expats as members and Little realised that she needed to not confuse her message with religion. In 1899, she published a 600-page book called Intimate China, which was amply illustrated by over 100 of her photographs. The book covered a variety of subjects but foot binding again got attention. Little with the support of her husband organised a campaign of postcards and Little set out to deliver talks in leading cities in China, Hong Kong and Macau. Little delivered these talks using X-rays of the deformed feet and with quotes from Confucius. She had seen and written about the effects of this custom where children's feet and toes were broken before they were bound to prevent normal growth. Women with bound feet had to work in the fields on their knees because they could not stand and women killed themselves during wars because they knew that they could not run.

Little criticized what she viewed as Western arrogance in attempting to change China to be more Western-like. She also cited China's experiences in her feminist discourses and other critiques of Western civilization. For example, writing on fengshui, Little said, "it often strikes me that far more foolish than the Chinese belief is the absolute disregard of climactic influences shown in England" and that "surely consideration of aspects of soild, waters, etc., is wiser than our disregard of all such potent forces of nature?"

Her 1902 book Out in China was reviewed at the time as a "political pamphlet". The story involves the wrong woman being sent from Britain to marry a man in China. The story ends with the wedding party being murdered by Boxers.

In 1908, her husband died and she took time to complete the publication of his book which was published in 1910 as a joint effort. It was one of the first in English to describe the province of Yunnan.

Little died in Kensington.

== Legacy ==
Little is unusual in being one of the few women who outshone their husband in the ODNB. Her work on foot binding was well received but has now been seen as expressing British cultural superiority. Her work has been compared with some external approaches to the custom of female genital mutilation in Africa in the 21st century.

== Selected publications ==
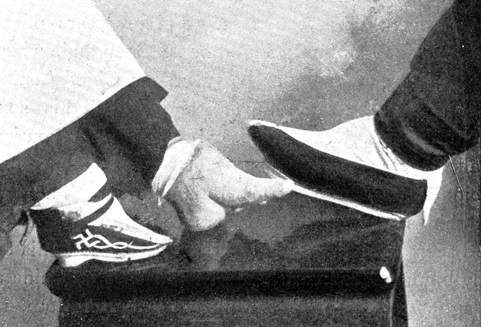
A woman's natural foot and another bound to 6 inches by Dr Garner from Alicia Little's book Intimate China

- Flirts and Flirts: or, A Season at Ryde (1868)
- One Foot on Shore: A Novel (1869)
- Love me for my Love (1869)
- Last of the Jerninghames (1873)
- Lonely Carlotta: "a crimson bud of a rose" (1874)
- Onwards! But Whither?: A Life Study (1875)
- Margery Travers (1878)
- Miss Standish, and By the Bay of Naples (1883)
- Mother Darling (1885)
- A Marriage in China (1896)
- My Diary in a Chinese Farm (1896)
- Intimate China (1899)
- Li Hung-Chang: His Life and Times (1903)
- Across Yunnan: A Journey of Surprises (1908) on behalf of her late husband
