= Foot binding =

Former Chinese custom

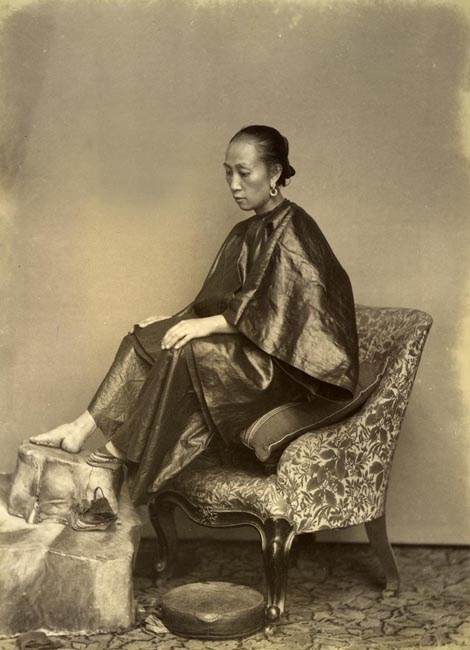
- A Chinese woman showing her foot, image by Lai Afong, c. 1870s
- Traditional Chinese: 纏足
- Simplified Chinese: 缠足
Transcriptions
Standard Mandarin
- Hanyu Pinyin: chánzú
- Wade–Giles: ch'an^{2}-tsu^{2}
- IPA: [ʈʂʰǎn.tsǔ]

Alternative Cantonese name
- Traditional Chinese: 紮腳
- Simplified Chinese: 扎脚
Transcriptions
Yue: Cantonese
- Yale Romanization: jaat-geuk
- Jyutping: zaat3-goek3
- IPA: [tsat̚˧.kœk̚˧]
other Yue
- Taishanese: zat1 giak1

Alternative Wu name
- Traditional Chinese: 繞小腳
- Simplified Chinese: 绕小脚
Transcriptions
Wu
- Romanization: ^{6}gniau ^{5}shiau-ciaq

Alternative Southern Min name
- Traditional Chinese: 縛跤
- Simplified Chinese: 缚跤
Transcriptions
Southern Min
- Hokkien POJ: pa̍k-kha

Alternative Northern Min name
- Traditional Chinese: 紮跤
- Simplified Chinese: 扎跤
Transcriptions
Northern Min
- Jian'ou Romanized: cuŏi-káu

Foot binding (simplified Chinese: 缠足; traditional Chinese: 纏足; pinyin: chánzú), or footbinding, was the Chinese custom of breaking and tightly binding the feet of young girls to change their shape and size. Feet altered by foot binding were known as lotus feet and the shoes made for them were known as lotus shoes. In late imperial China, bound feet were considered a status symbol and a mark of feminine beauty. Foot binding was a painful practice that limited the mobility of women and resulted in lifelong disabilities.

The prevalence and practice of foot binding varied over time, by region, and by social class. The practice may have originated among court dancers during the Five Dynasties and Ten Kingdoms period in 10th-century China and gradually became popular among the elite during the Song dynasty, later spreading to lower social classes by the Qing dynasty (1644–1912). Manchu emperors attempted to ban the practice in the 17th century but failed. In some areas, foot binding raised marriage prospects. It has been estimated that by the 19th century 40–50% of all Chinese women may have had bound feet, rising to almost 100% among upper-class Han Chinese women. Frontier ethnic groups such as Uyghurs, Manchus, Mongols, and Tibetans generally did not practice footbinding. In some regions, Han Chinese influence spread the practice to non-Han women, such as the Hui people.

Chinese reformers as well as Christian missionaries challenged the practice in the late 19th century, and the practice began to die out in the early 20th century, following the efforts of anti-foot binding campaigns. Upper-class and urban women dropped the practice sooner than poorer rural women. By 2007, only a handful of elderly Chinese women whose feet had been bound were still alive.

== History ==
=== Origin ===
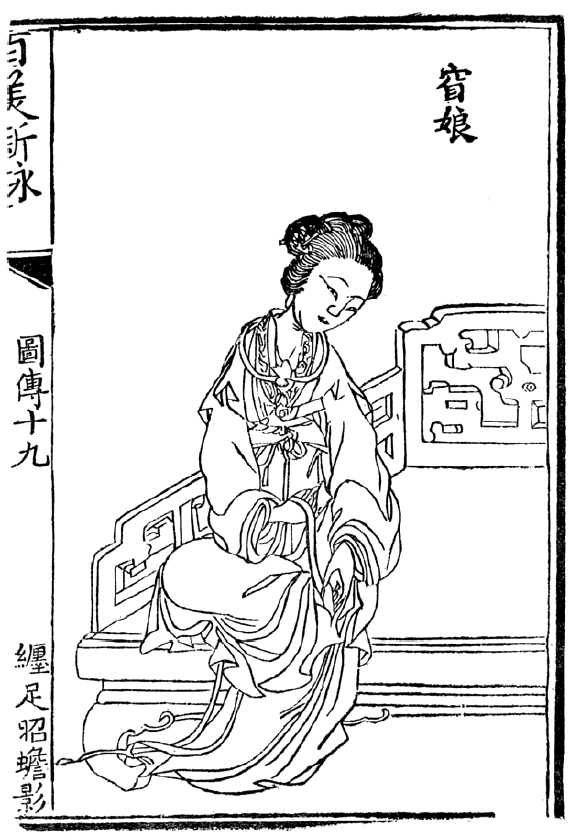
18th-century illustration showing Yao Niang binding her own feet

There are a number of stories about the origin of foot binding before its establishment during the Song dynasty. One of these accounts is of Pan Yunu, a favourite consort of the Southern Qi Emperor Xiao Baojuan. In the story, Pan Yunu, renowned for having delicate feet, performed a dance barefoot on a floor decorated with the design of a golden lotus. The Emperor, expressing admiration, said that "lotus springs from her every step!" (bù bù shēng lián 歩歩生蓮), a reference to the Buddhist legend of Padmavati, under whose feet lotus springs forth. This story may have given rise to the terms 'golden lotus' or 'lotus feet' used to describe bound feet; there is no evidence, however, that Consort Pan ever bound her feet.

An early story of foot binding suggests it was used in a dance similar to ballet. This story indicates that footbinding may have originated during the reign of the 10th-century Emperor Li Yu of the Southern Tang, just before the Song dynasty. Li Yu created a 1.8-meter-tall (6 ft) golden lotus decorated with precious stones and pearls and asked his concubine Yao Niang (窅娘) to bind her feet in white silk into the shape of the crescent moon. She wraps silken ribbons around her feet, like a modern ballet dancer, then dances on her toes. Yao Niang's dance was said to be so graceful that others sought to imitate her. The binding of feet was then replicated by other upper-class women and the practice spread.

Some of the earliest possible references to foot binding appear around 1100, when a couple of poems seemed to allude to the practice. Soon after 1148, in the earliest extant discourse on the practice of foot binding, scholar Zhang Bangji wrote that a bound foot should be arch-shaped and small. He observed that "women's foot binding began in recent times; it was not mentioned in any books from previous eras." In the 13th century, scholar Che Ruoshui wrote the first known criticism of the practice: "Little girls not yet four or five years old, who have done nothing wrong, nevertheless are made to suffer unlimited pain to bind [their feet] small. I do not know what use this is."

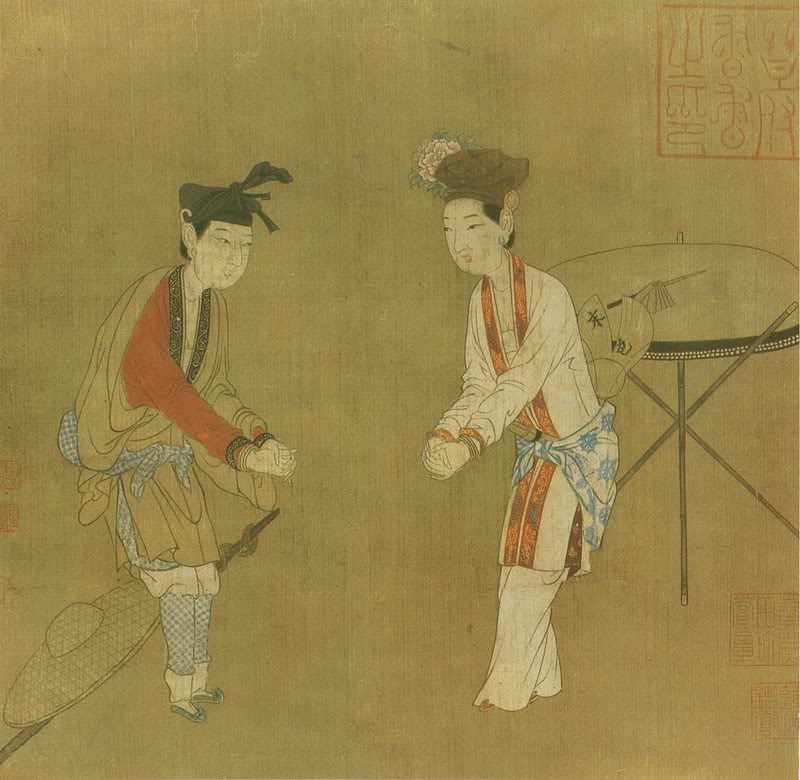
Southern Song zaju actresses with a form of footbinding of the period

The earliest archeological evidence for foot binding dates to the tombs of Huang Sheng, who died in 1243 at the age of 17, and Madame Zhou, who died in 1274. Each woman's remains showed feet bound with gauze strips measuring 1.8 m (6 ft) in length. Zhou's skeleton, particularly well preserved, showed that her feet fit into the narrow, pointed slippers that were buried with her. The style of bound feet found in Song dynasty tombs, where the big toe was bent upwards, appears to be different from the 'three-inch golden lotus' of later eras.

=== Later eras ===
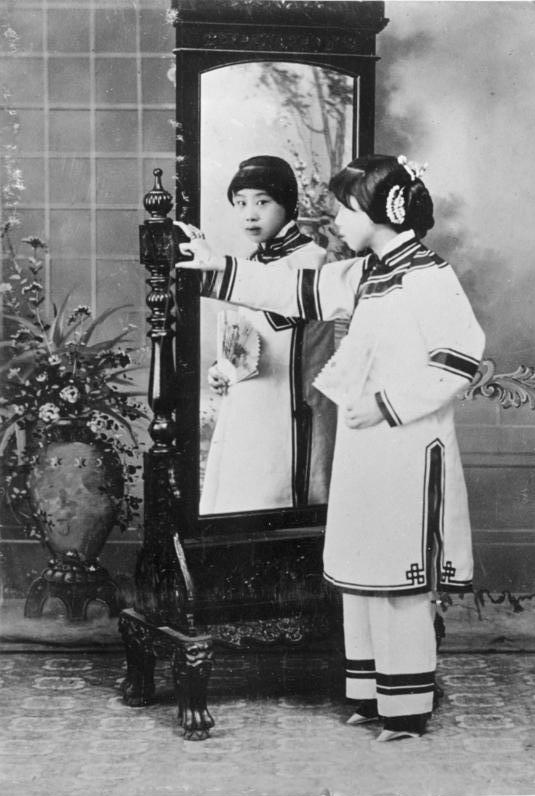
Small bound feet were once considered beautiful while large unbound feet were judged as crude.

At the end of the Song dynasty, men would drink from a special shoe, the heel of which contained a small cup. During the Yuan dynasty some would also drink directly from the shoe itself. This practice was called 'toast to the golden lotus' and lasted until the late Qing dynasty.

The first European to mention foot binding was the Italian missionary Odoric of Pordenone in the 14th century, during the Yuan dynasty. However no other foreign visitors to Yuan China mentioned the practice, including Ibn Battuta and Marco Polo (who nevertheless noted the dainty walk of Chinese women, who took very small steps), perhaps an indication that it was not a widespread or extreme practice at that time. The Mongols themselves did not practice footbinding but it was permitted for their Chinese subjects. The practice became increasingly common among the gentry families, later spreading to the general populace, as commoners and theatre actors alike adopted foot binding. By the Ming period the practice was no longer the preserve of the gentry but it was considered a status symbol. As foot binding restricted the movement of a woman, one side effect of its rising popularity was the corresponding decline of the art of women's dance in China, and it became increasingly rare to hear about beauties and courtesans who were also great dancers after the Song era.

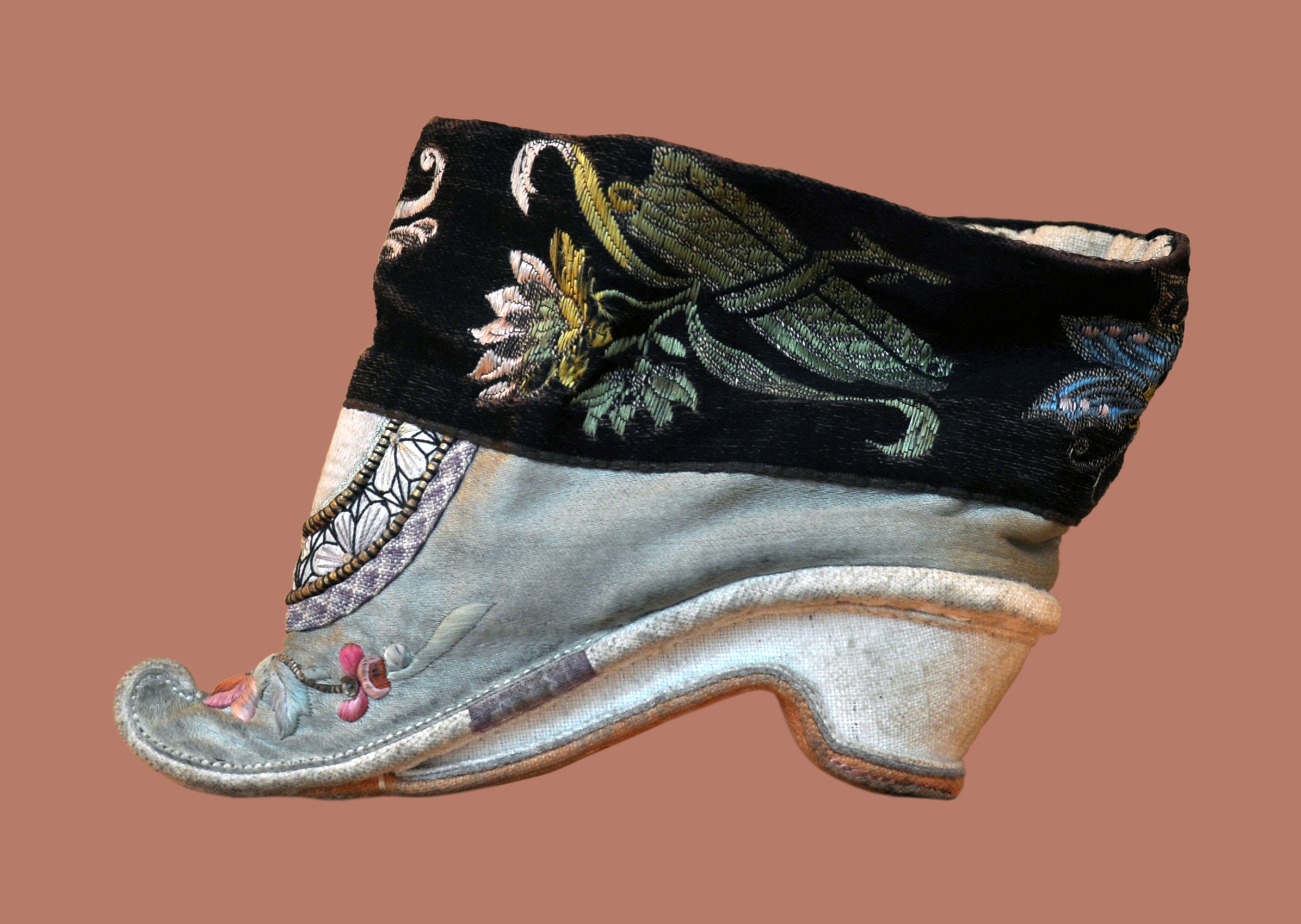
A lotus shoe for bound feet, Louise Weiss collection, Saverne

Archeological evidence suggests that footbinding became more popular in the late Ming, and the form of footbinding also changed. Analyses of women's remains in some Ming dynasty tombs found only mild forms of footbinding or no footbinding at all, while in other tombs the debilitating practice of altering the shape of foot bones had appeared by the late Ming period. The idea of three-inch bound feet is also believed to have originated during the Ming dynasty, suggesting that the more severe form of footbinding started in this period.

The Manchus issued a number of edicts to ban the practice, first in 1636 when the Manchu leader Hong Taiji declared the founding of the new Qing dynasty, then in 1638, and another in 1664 by the Kangxi Emperor. Few Han Chinese complied with the edicts, and Kangxi eventually abandoned the effort in 1668. By the 19th century, it was estimated that 40–50% of Chinese women had bound feet. Among upper class Han Chinese women, the figure was almost 100%. Bound feet became a mark of beauty and were also a prerequisite for finding a husband. They also became an avenue for poorer women to marry up in some areas, such as Sichuan. In late 19th century Guangdong it was customary to bind the feet of the eldest daughter of a lower-class family who was intended to be brought up as a lady. Her younger sisters would grow up to be bond-servants or domestic slaves and be able to work in the fields, but the eldest daughter would be assumed never to have the need to work. Women, their families and their husbands took great pride in tiny feet, with the ideal length, called the 'Golden Lotus', being about three Chinese inches (寸) long—around 11 cm (4.3 in). This pride was reflected in the elegantly embroidered silk slippers and wrappings girls and women wore to cover their feet. Handmade shoes served to exhibit the embroidery skill of the wearer as well. These shoes also served as support, as some women with bound feet might not have been able to walk without the support of their shoes and would have been severely limited in their mobility. Contrary to missionary writings, many women with bound feet were able to walk and work in the fields, albeit with greater limitations than their non-bound counterparts.

In the 19th and early 20th centuries, there were dancers with bound feet as well as circus performers who stood on prancing or running horses. Women with bound feet in one village in Yunnan Province formed a regional dance troupe to perform for tourists in the late 20th century, though age has since forced the group to retire. In other areas, women in their 70s and 80s assisted in the rice fields (albeit in a limited capacity) even into the early 21st century.

=== Decline ===
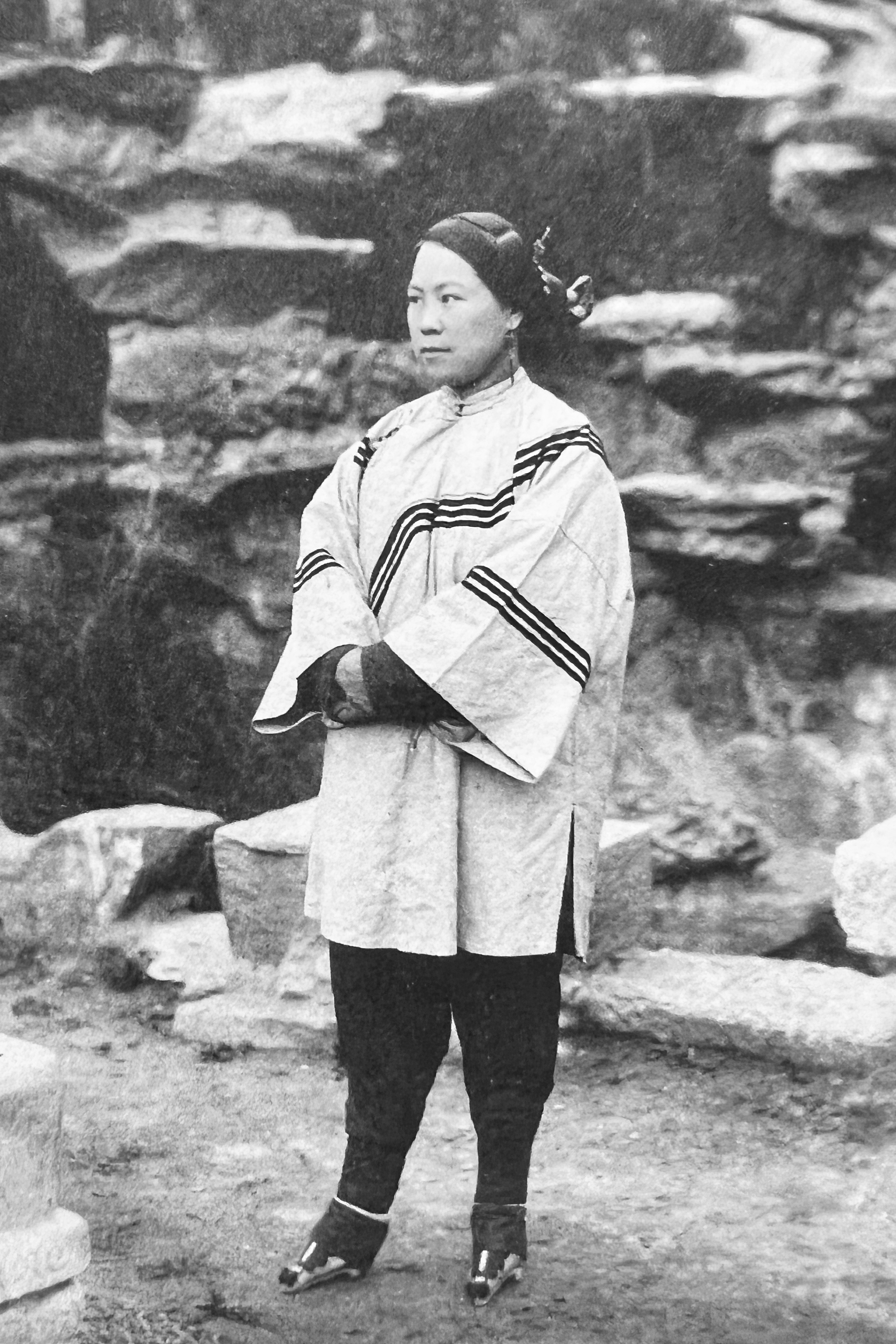
A woman with bound feet in the 1900s, shortly before the practice was banned

"Chinese Women's Feet"
Scientific American 1880
Read by Availle for LibriVox
Audio 00:04:29 (full text)

Opposition to foot binding had been raised by some Chinese writers in the 18th century. In the mid-19th century, many of the leaders of the Taiping Rebellion were men of Hakka background whose women did not bind their feet, and they outlawed foot binding in areas under their control. However the rebellion failed and Christian missionaries, who had provided education for girls and actively discouraged what they considered a barbaric practice that had deleterious social effect on women, then played a part in changing elite opinion on foot binding through education, pamphleteering and lobbying of the Qing court, as no other culture in the world practised the custom of foot binding.

The earliest-known Western anti-foot binding society was formed in Amoy (Xiamen) in 1874. 60–70 Christian women in Xiamen attended a meeting presided over by a missionary, John MacGowan, and formed the Natural Foot Society (Tianzu Hui (天足会), literally Heavenly Foot Society). MacGowan held the view that foot binding was a serious problem that called into doubt the whole of Chinese civilization; he felt that "the nefarious civilization interferes with Divine Nature." Members of the Heavenly Foot Society vowed not to bind their daughters' feet. In 1895, Christian women in Shanghai led by Alicia Little, also formed a Natural Foot Society. Little had once sought help from Han Chinese officials of the Qing dynasty, but with little success. The Qing official Li Hongzhang told her meaningfully:"If women's feet are liberated, they will become strong, men are already strong, if that happens, they will join forces and overthrow the Qing dynasty." It was also championed by the Woman's Christian Temperance Movement founded in 1883 and advocated by missionaries including Timothy Richard, who thought that Christianity could promote equality between the sexes. This missionary-led opposition had stronger impacts than earlier Han or Manchu opposition. Western missionaries established the first schools for girls, and encouraged women to end the practice of foot binding. Christian missionaries did not conceal their shock and disgust either when explaining the process of foot binding to Western peers and their descriptions shocked their audience back home.

Reform-minded Chinese intellectuals began to consider foot binding to be an aspect of their culture that needed to be eliminated. In 1883, Kang Youwei founded the Anti-footbinding Society near Canton to combat the practice, and anti-foot binding societies appeared across the country, with membership for the movement claimed to reach 300,000. The anti-foot binding movement stressed pragmatic and patriotic reasons rather than feminist ones, arguing that abolition of foot binding would lead to better health and more efficient labour. Kang Youwei submitted a petition to the throne commenting on the fact that China had become a joke to foreigners and that "footbinding was the primary object of such ridicule."

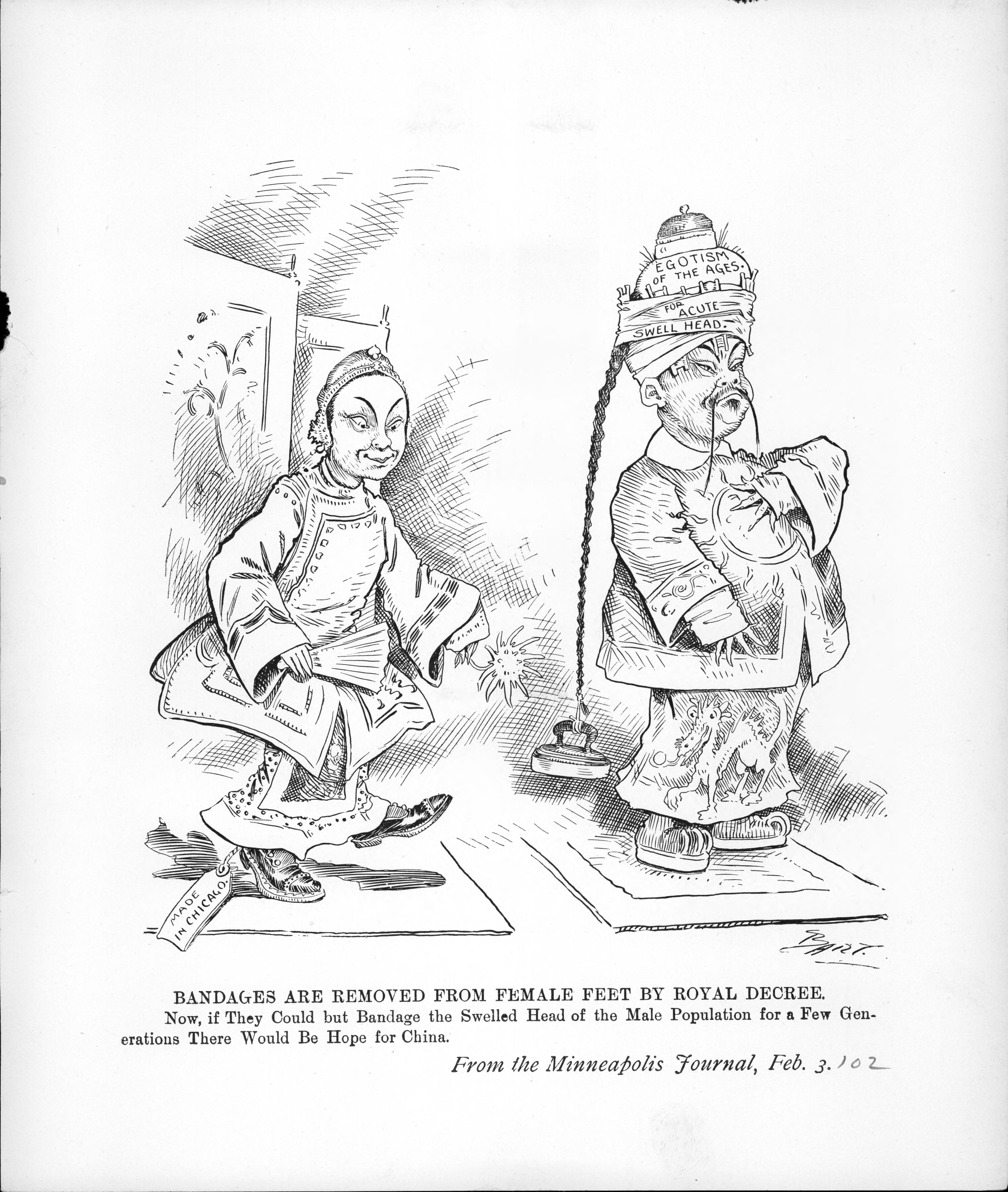
A western cartoon mocking the perceived backwardness and sexism of footbinding

Reformers such as Liang Qichao, influenced by Social Darwinism, also argued that it weakened the nation, since enfeebled women supposedly produced weak sons. In his "On Women's Education", Liang Qichao asserts that the root cause of national weakness inevitably lies in the lack of education for women. Qichao connected education for women and foot binding: "As long as foot binding remains in practice, women's education can never flourish." Qichao was also disappointed that foreigners had opened the first schools as he thought that the Chinese should be teaching Chinese women. At the turn of the 20th century, early feminists, such as Qiu Jin, called for the end of foot binding. In 1906, Zhao Zhiqian wrote in Beijing Women's News to blame women with bound feet for being a national weakness in the eyes of other nations. Many members of anti-foot binding groups pledged to not bind their daughters' feet nor to allow their sons to marry women with bound feet. In 1902, Empress Dowager Cixi issued an anti-foot binding edict, but it was soon rescinded.

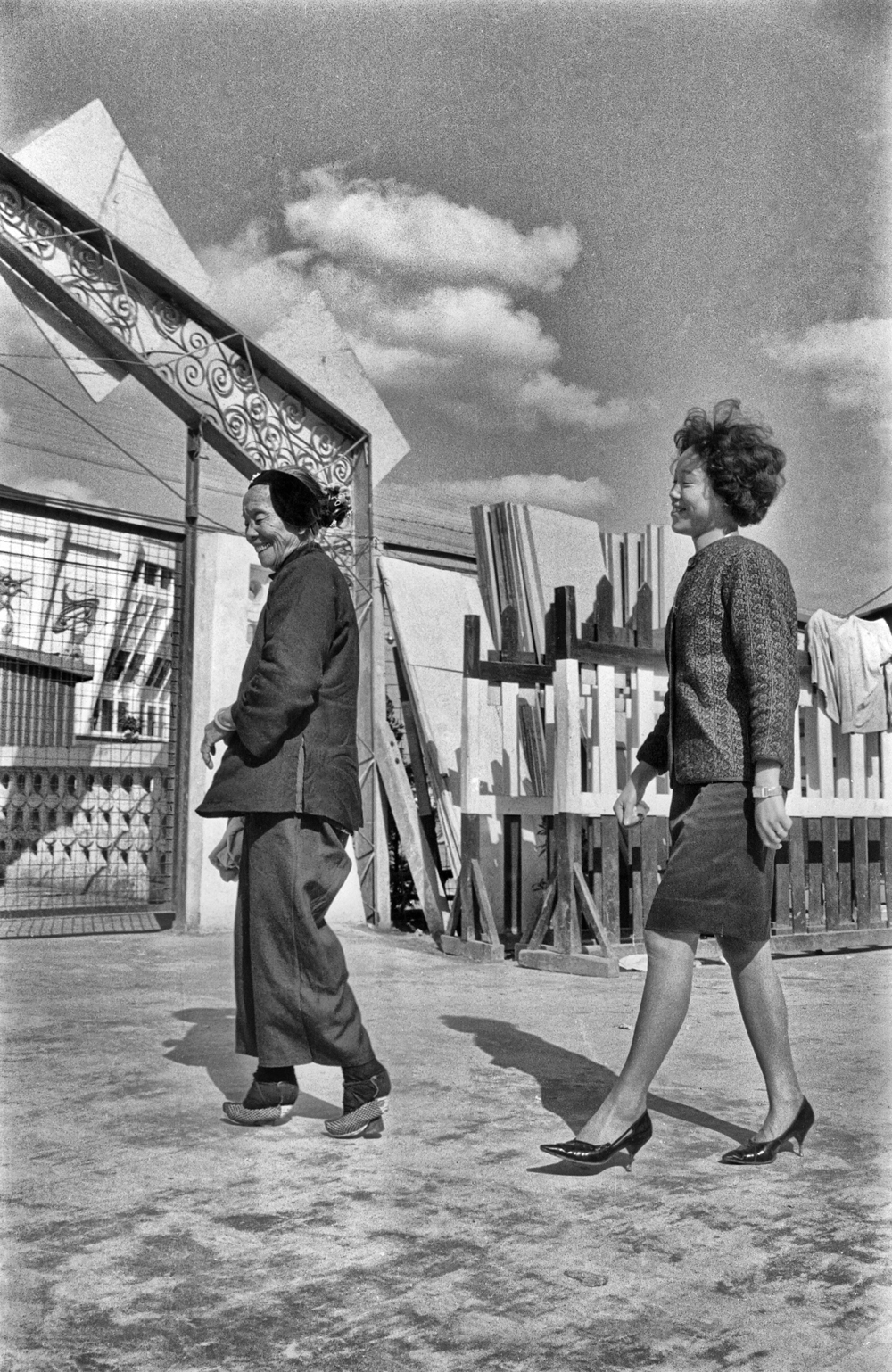
An elderly woman with bound feet and a young woman with normal feet in 1960s Taiwan

In 1912 the new Republic of China government banned foot binding, though the ban was not actively implemented, and leading intellectuals of the May Fourth Movement saw foot binding as a major symbol of China's backwardness. Provincial leaders, such as Yan Xishan in Shanxi, engaged in their own sustained campaign against foot binding with foot inspectors and fines for those who continued the practice, while regional governments of the later Nanjing regime also enforced the ban. The campaign against foot binding was successful in some regions. In one province, a 1929 survey showed that, while only 2.3% of girls born before 1910 had unbound feet, 95% of those born after were not bound. In a region south of Beijing, Dingxian, where over 99% of women once had bound feet, no new cases were found among those born after 1919. In Taiwan, the practice was also discouraged by the ruling Japanese from the beginning of Japanese rule, and from 1911 to 1915 it was gradually made illegal. The practice lingered on in some regions in China. In 1928, a census in rural Shanxi found that 18% of women had bound feet, while in some remote rural areas, such as Yunnan Province, it continued to be practiced until the 1950s. In most parts of China the practice had virtually disappeared by 1949. The practice was also stigmatized in Communist China, and the last vestiges of foot binding were stamped out, with the last new case of foot binding reported in 1957. By the 21st century, only a few elderly women in China still had bound feet. In 1999, the last shoe factory making lotus shoes, the Zhiqian Shoe Factory in Harbin, closed.

== Practice ==
=== Variations and prevalence ===
Foot binding was practised in various forms and its prevalence varied in different regions. Early forms of footbinding were milder, but more severe forms appeared by the late Ming period. There were two distinct regional styles in the early 17th century: the Northern and Southern styles. The Northern style (found in Hebei, Shanxi, Shandong, and Shaanxi) had a big heel with a small forefoot with four toes tucked under the big toe, while the Southern style of footbinding (found in Guangdong, Guangxi, Hunan, Hubei, Yunnan, Fujian, and Guizhou and Taiwan) pulled the forefoot towards the heel, forming a cleft between the forefoot and heel. A less severe form in Sichuan, called "cucumber foot" (huángguā jiǎo 黃瓜腳) due to its slender shape, folded the four toes under but did not distort the heel or taper the ankle. Some working women in Jiangsu made a pretence of binding while keeping their feet natural. Not all women were always bound—some women once bound remained bound throughout their lives, some were only briefly bound and some were bound until marriage. Foot binding was most common among women whose work involved domestic crafts and those in urban areas; it was also more common in northern China, where it was widely practised by women of all social classes, but less so in parts of southern China such as Guangdong and Guangxi, where it was largely a practice of women in the provincial capitals or among the gentry. Feet were bound to their smallest in the northern provinces of Hebei, Shandong, Shanxi and Shaanxi, but the binding was less extreme and less common in the southern provinces of Guangdong, Guangxi, Yunnan and Guizhou, where not all daughters of the wealthy had bound feet. Foot binding limited the mobility of girls, so they became engaged in handwork from childhood. It is thought that the necessity for female labour in the fields owing to a longer growing season in the South and the impracticability of bound feet working in wet rice fields limited the spread of the practice in the countryside of the South. However some farming women bound their daughter's feet, but "the process began later than in elite families, and feet were bound more loosely among the poor."

Scholarly estimates of the number of women with bound feet at the height of the practice range widely, but most modern historians place the figure between 10 and 20 million. Historian John R. Shepherd, drawing on Qing dynasty and early Republican census records, argues that footbinding reached its demographic peak in the mid- to late-19th century, particularly among Han women in the central and eastern provinces. Based on Taiwan's 1905 census, Shepherd found that over two-thirds of Hoklo women had bound feet, while Hakka and indigenous groups had binding rates below 1 percent. Laurel Bossen and Hill Gates, drawing on interviews with thousands of elderly rural Chinese women, conclude that footbinding was nearly universal among inland Han women born before 1910, although its prevalence declined rapidly after 1915.

The practice transcended social class, though its function varied. While gentry families bound their daughters' feet to conform to elite aesthetics and reinforce chastity, some rural households bound only one daughter's feet to improve marriage prospects while leaving others unbound for agricultural labor. In textile-producing areas, footbinding was often linked to a household labor strategy: bound girls were confined indoors and tasked with spinning and weaving, while unbound girls performed fieldwork. Scholar C. Fred Blake argued that footbinding in these contexts "appropriated" female labor by enforcing immobility within the domestic sphere.

Urban–rural differences in prevalence became especially stark in the early 20th century. In port cities such as Xiamen and Shanghai, anti-footbinding societies successfully curbed the practice by the 1910s. A 1937 survey in Xiamen found that only 4.5 percent of women still had bound feet, almost all of them born before 1905. In contrast, rural surveys from the 1920s show lingering adherence: in villages of Hebei Province, 99.2 percent of women born before 1890 had bound feet, and as late as 1915, 60 percent of young girls were still being bound. These disparities suggest that urban elites abandoned footbinding first, while the practice persisted in the countryside into the 1930s.

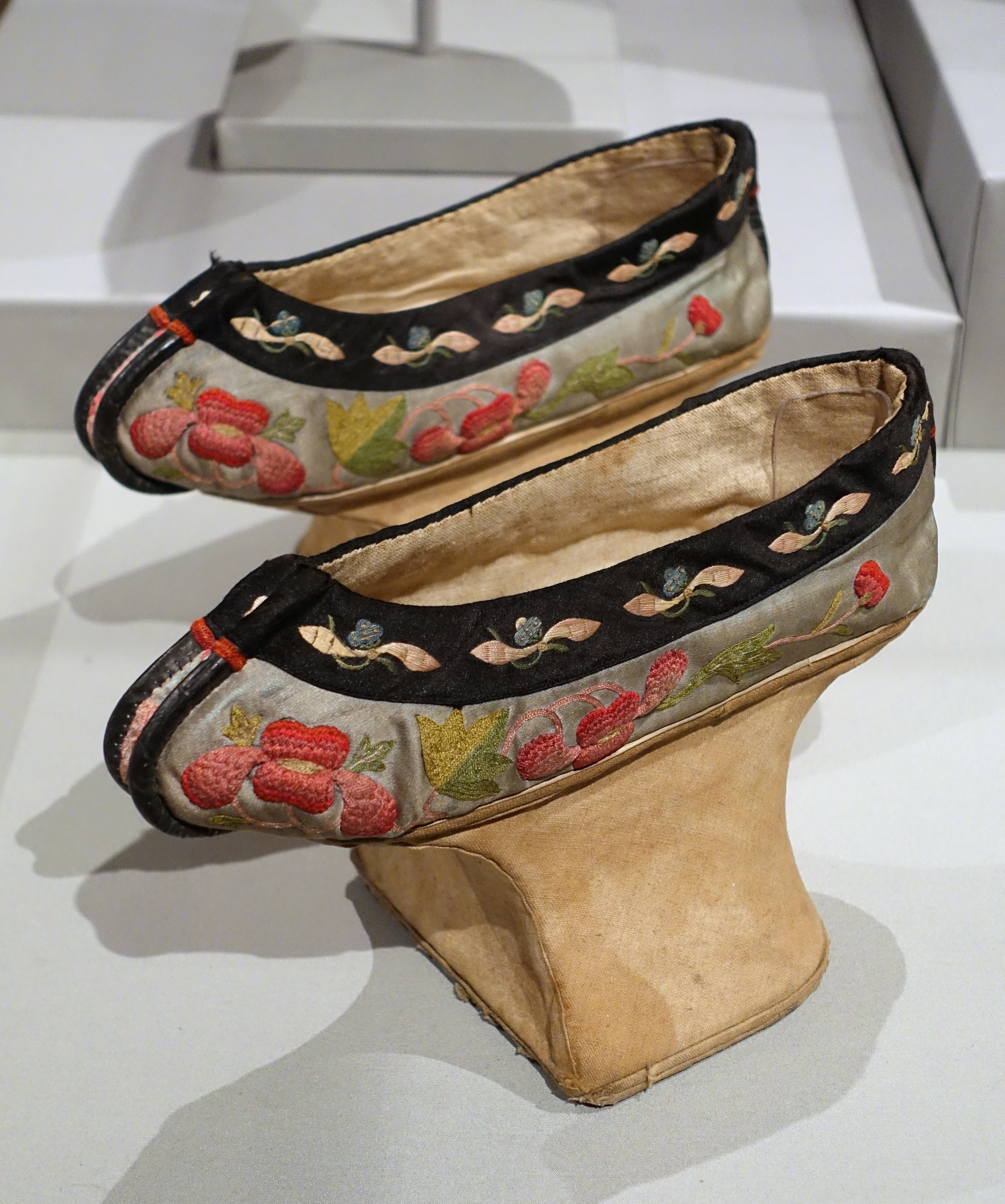
The Manchu "flower bowl" shoes designed to imitate bound feet, mid-1880s

Ethnic variation played a significant role in footbinding's distribution. Manchu women, who were officially prohibited from binding their feet, did not bind their feet. The most a Manchu woman might do was to wrap the feet tightly to give them a slender appearance. The Manchus, wanting to emulate the particular gait that bound feet necessitated, adapted their own form of platform shoes to cause them to walk in a similar swaying manner. These Manchu platform shoes were known as "flower bowl" shoes (Chinese: 花盆鞋; pinyin: Huāpénxié) or "horse-hoof" shoes (Chinese: 馬蹄鞋; pinyin: Mǎtíxié); they have a platform generally made of wood 5–20 cm (2–6 in) in height and fitted to the middle of the sole, or they have a small central tapered pedestal. Other non-Han groups, including Mongols and Tibetans, generally rejected the custom. Women in the Eight Banners, and many Han Chinese in the Inner City of Beijing also did not bind their feet. It was reported in the mid-1800s that around 50–60% of non-banner women had unbound feet. Han immigrant women to the Northeast came under Manchu influence and abandoned foot binding. Bound feet nevertheless became a significant differentiating marker between Han women and Manchu or other banner women. Assimilation occurred in some regions: Hui Muslim women in Gansu and Dungan communities in Central Asia retained footbinding into the 20th century, influenced by neighboring Han populations. In multiethnic areas, bound feet became a visible marker of Han female identity and distinction from non-Han groups.

The Hakka people were unusual among Han Chinese in not practising foot binding. Most non-Han Chinese people, such as the Manchus, Mongols and Tibetans, did not bind their feet. Some non-Han ethnic groups did. Foot binding was practised by the Hui Muslims in Gansu Province. The Dungan Muslims, descendants of Hui from northwestern China who fled to central Asia, were also practising foot binding up to 1948. In southern China, in Canton (Guangzhou), 19th-century Scottish scholar James Legge noted a mosque that had a placard denouncing foot binding, saying Islam did not allow it since it constituted violating the creation of God.

=== Process ===
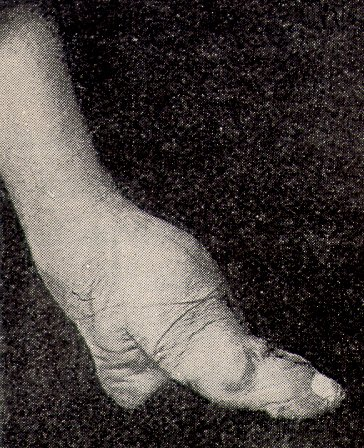
A bound foot

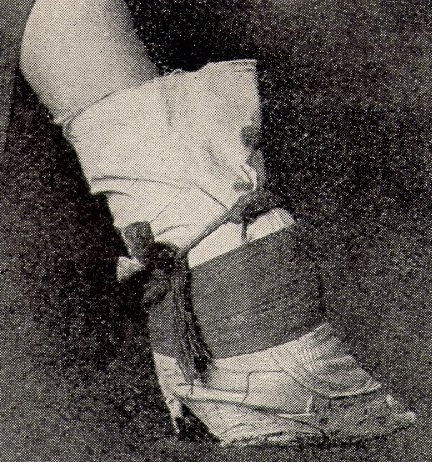
A bandaged bound foot

The process was started before the arch of the foot had a chance to develop fully, usually between the ages of four and nine. Binding usually started during the winter months since the feet were more likely to be numb and the pain would not be as extreme.

First, each foot would be soaked in a warm mixture of herbs and animal blood. This was intended to soften the foot and aid the binding. Then the toenails were cut back as far as possible to prevent in-growth and subsequent infections, since the toes were to be pressed tightly into the sole of the foot. Cotton bandages, 3 m (10 ft) long and 5 cm (2 in) wide, were prepared by soaking them in the blood and herb mixture. To enable the size of the feet to be reduced, the toes on each foot were curled under, then pressed with great force downwards and squeezed into the sole of the foot until the toes broke.

The bandages were repeatedly wound in a figure-eight movement, starting at the inside of the foot at the instep, then carried over the toes, under the foot and around the heel, the broken toes being pressed tightly into the sole of the foot. The foot was drawn down straight with the leg and the arch of the foot forcibly broken. At each pass around the foot, the binding cloth was tightened, pulling the ball of the foot and the heel together, causing the broken foot to fold at the arch, pressing the toes beneath the sole. The binding was pulled so tightly that the girl could not move her toes at all and the ends of the binding cloth were then sewn so that the girl could not loosen it.

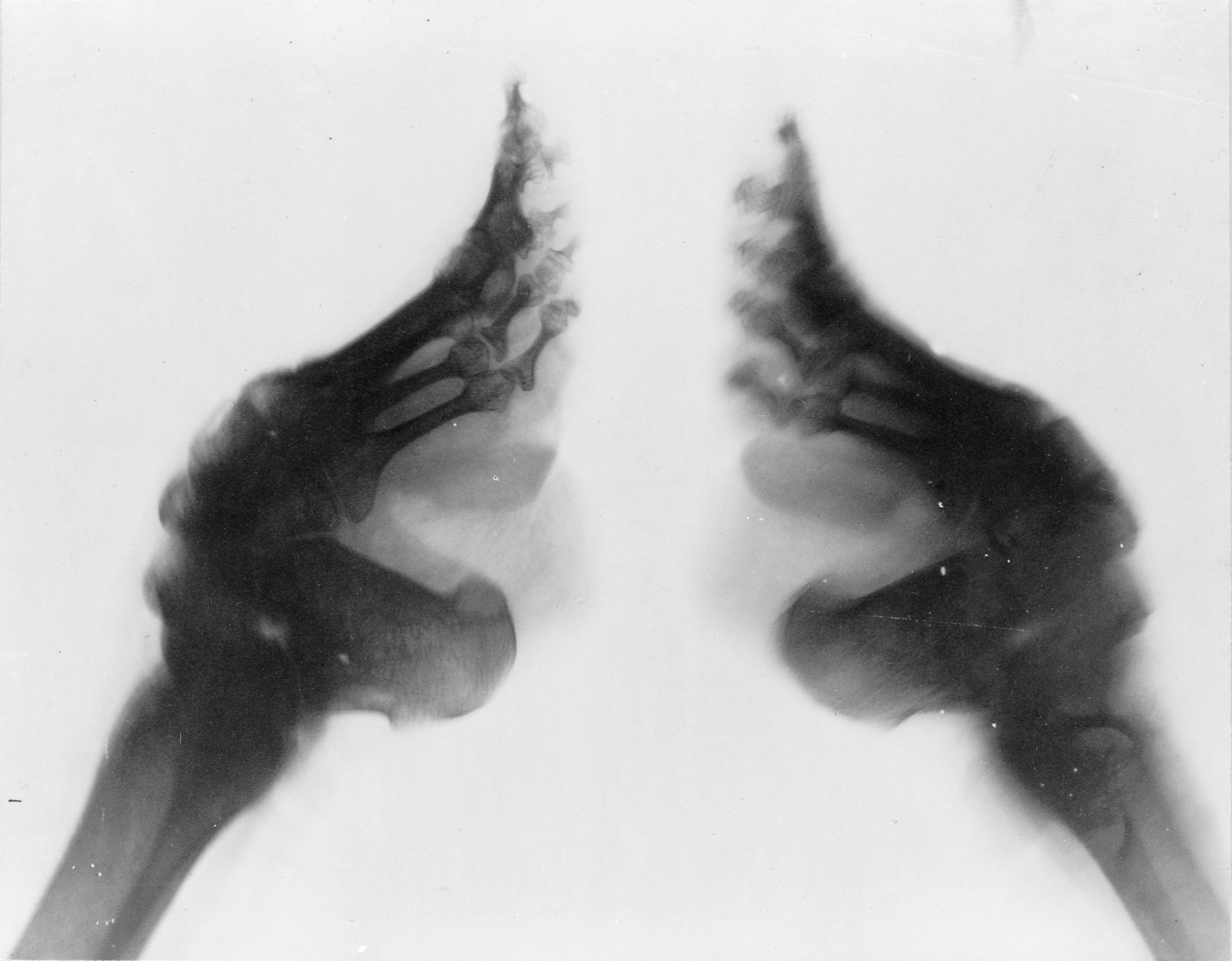
An X-ray of two bound feet

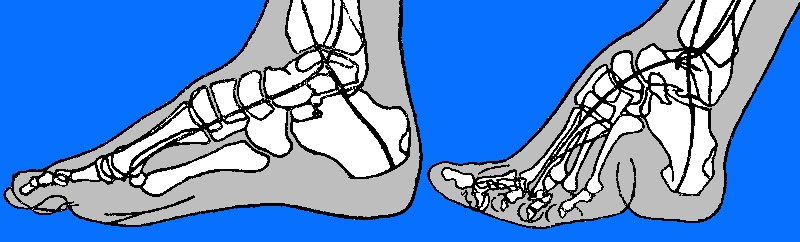
Schema of an X-ray comparison between an unbound and bound foot

The girl's broken feet required a great deal of care and attention and they would be unbound regularly. Each time the feet were unbound they were washed, the toes checked for injury, and the nails trimmed. When unbound, the broken feet were also kneaded to soften them and the soles of the girl's feet were often beaten to make the joints and broken bones more flexible. The feet were also soaked in a concoction that caused necrotic flesh to fall off.

Immediately after this procedure, the girl's broken toes were folded back under and the feet were rebound. The bindings were pulled even tighter each time the girl's feet were rebound. This unbinding and rebinding ritual was repeated as often as possible (for the rich at least once daily, for poor peasants two or three times a week), with fresh bindings. It was generally an elder female member of the girl's family or a professional footbinder who carried out the initial breaking and ongoing binding of the feet. It was considered preferable to have someone other than the mother do it, as she might have been sympathetic to her daughter's pain and less willing to keep the bindings tight.

Once a girl's foot had been crushed and bound, attempting to reverse the process by unbinding was painful, and the shape could not be reversed without a woman undergoing the same pain again. The timing and degree of foot binding varied among communities.

=== Health problems ===
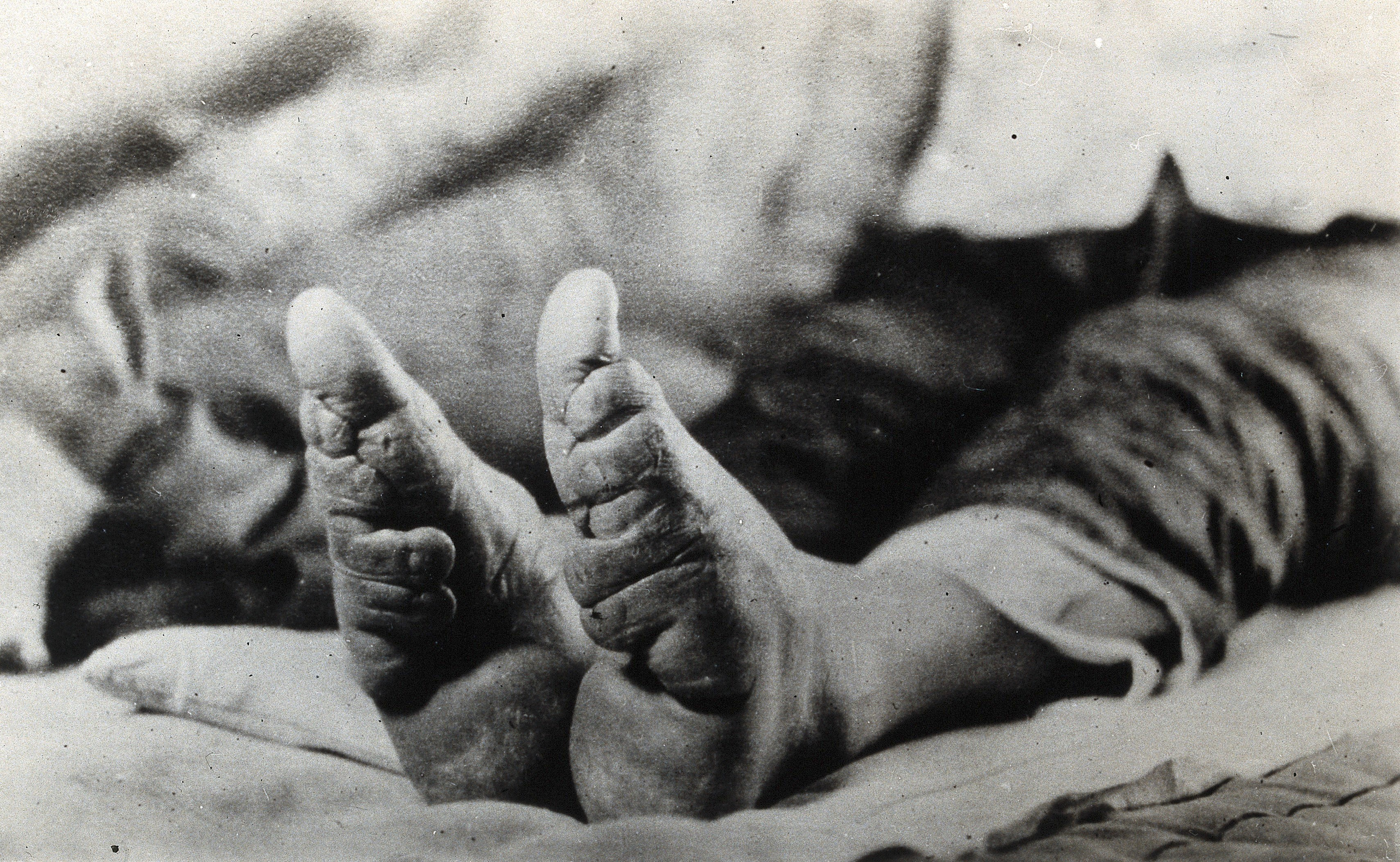
Feet of a Chinese woman, showing the effect of foot-binding

The most common problem with bound feet was infection. Despite the amount of care taken in regularly trimming the toenails, they would often in-grow, becoming infected and causing injuries to the toes. Sometimes, for this reason, the girl's toenails would be peeled back and removed altogether. The tightness of the binding meant that the circulation in the feet was faulty, and the circulation to the toes was almost cut off, so injuries to the toes were unlikely to heal and were likely to gradually worsen and lead to infected toes and rotting flesh. The necrosis of the flesh would initially give off a foul odour. Later, the smell may have come from various microorganisms that colonized the folds. Most of the women receiving treatment did not go out often and were disabled.

If the infection in the feet and toes entered the bones, it could cause them to soften, which could result in toes dropping off. This was seen as a benefit because the feet could then be bound even more tightly. Girls whose toes were more fleshy would sometimes have shards of glass or pieces of broken tiles inserted within the binding next to her feet and between her toes to cause injury and introduce infection deliberately. Disease inevitably followed infection, meaning that death from septic shock could result from foot binding, and a surviving girl was more at risk of medical problems as she grew older. It is thought that as many as 10% of girls may have died from gangrene and other infections owing to foot binding.

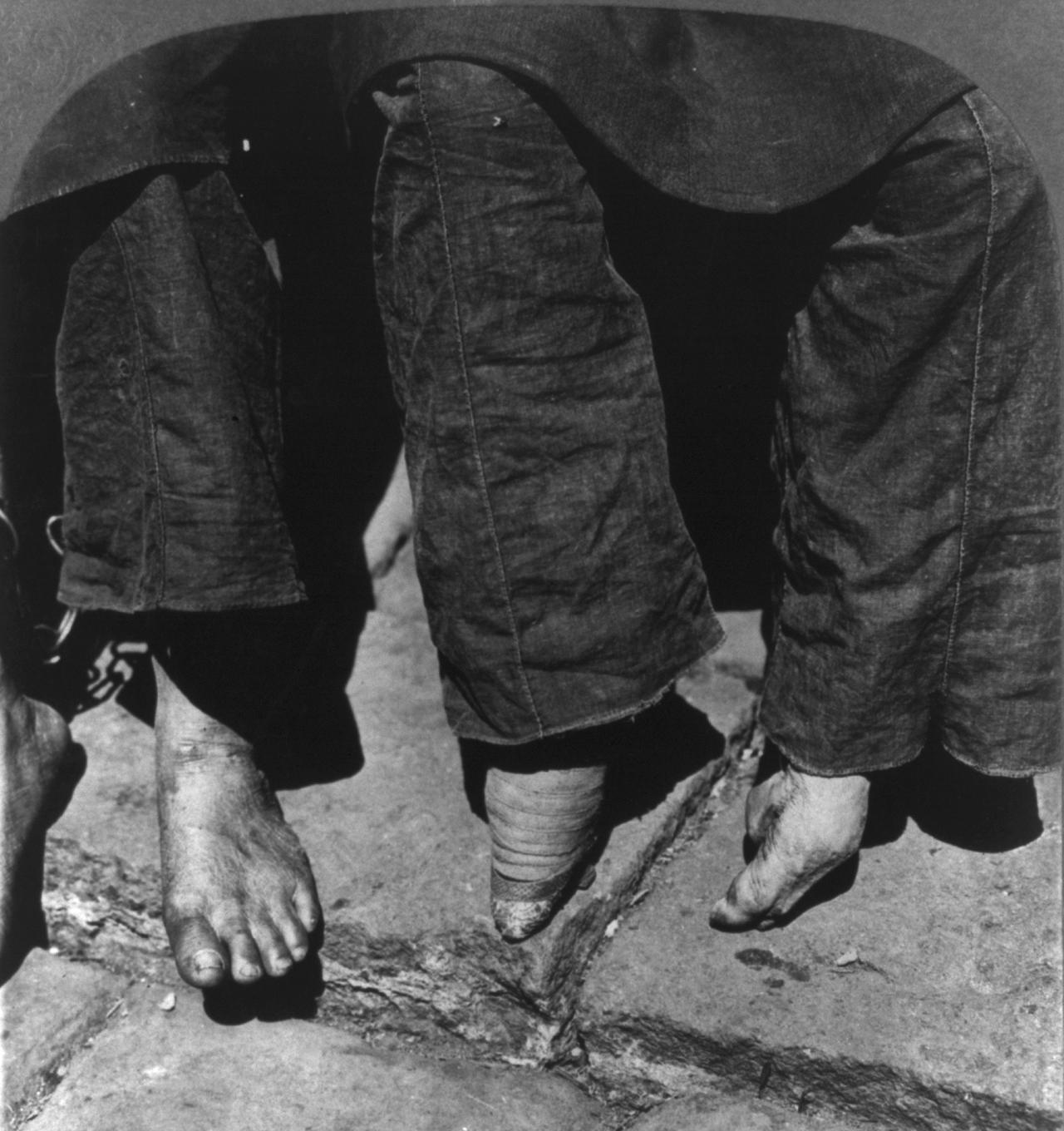
A comparison between a woman with unbound feet (left) and a woman with bound feet (right) in 1902.

At the beginning of the binding, many of the foot bones would remain broken, often for years. However as the girl grew older the bones would begin to heal. Even after the foot bones had healed, they were prone to rebreaking repeatedly, especially when the girl was in her teenage years and her feet were still soft. Bones in the girls' feet would often be deliberately broken again to further change the size or shape of the feet. This was especially the case with the girl's toes, which were broken several times since small toes were especially desirable. Older women were more likely to break hips and other bones in falls, since they could not balance properly on their feet, and were less able to rise to their feet from a sitting position. Other issues that may have arisen from foot binding included paralysis and muscular atrophy. By the turn of the century, foot binding had been exposed in photographs, X-rays and detailed textual descriptions. These scientific investigations detailed how foot binding deformed the leg, covered the skin with cracks and sores and altered the posture. There is also some evidence that points to some older women in select rural areas experiencing higher levels of osteoporosis morbidities.

== Views and interpretations ==
There are many interpretations to the practice of foot binding. The interpretive models used include fashion (with the Chinese customs somewhat comparable to the more extreme examples of Western women's fashion such as the wasp waist), seclusion (sometimes evaluated as morally superior to the gender mingling in the West), perversion (the practice imposed by men with sexual perversions), inexplicable deformation, child abuse and extreme cultural traditionalism. Western interpretations of footbinding were shaped by changing assumptions about gender, aesthetics, and social order, and do not fully capture the range of meanings the practice held within Chinese society. Chinese studies compare foot binding to European corset to illustrate the customs of bodily deformation developed in different countries. In the late 20th century some feminists introduced positive overtones, reporting that it gave some women a sense of mastery over their bodies and pride in their beauty.

=== Beauty and erotic appeal ===
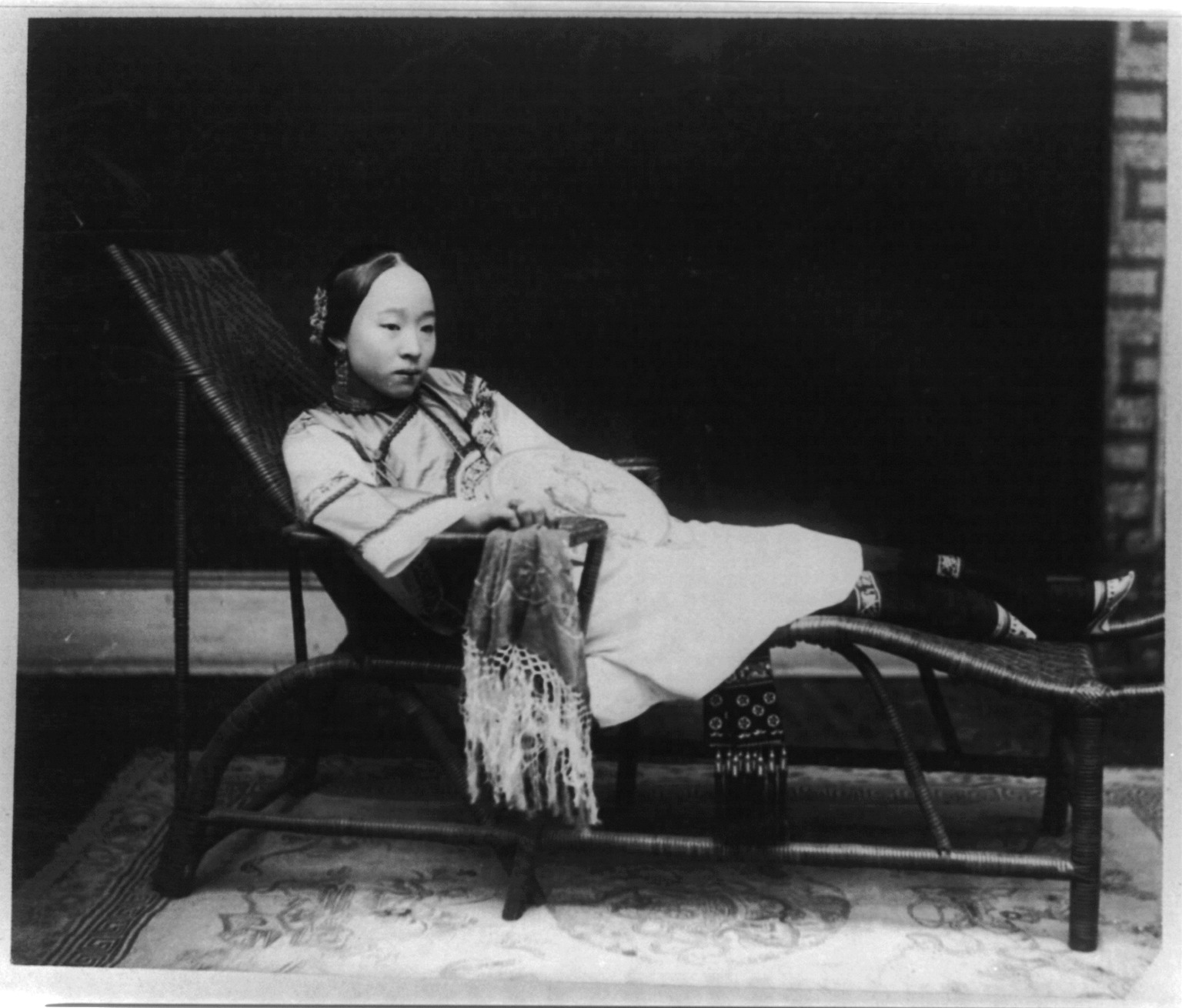
Bound feet were considered beautiful and even erotic.

Before foot binding was practised in China, admiration for small feet already existed as demonstrated by the Tang dynasty tale of Ye Xian written around 850 by Duan Chengshi. This tale of a girl who lost her shoe and then married a king who sought the owner of the shoe as only her foot was small enough to fit the shoe contains elements of the European story of Cinderella and is thought to be one of its antecedents. For many, the bound feet were an enhancement to a woman's beauty and made her movement more dainty, and a woman with perfect lotus feet was likely to make a more prestigious marriage. Foot binding was also connected to ideas of ideal femininity and morality. Wang Ping explains that cultural stories and images surrounding bound feet helped turn tiny-footed women into symbols of femininity, morality, and desire. Even while not much was written on the subject of foot binding prior to the latter half of the 19th century, the writings that were done on this topic, particularly by educated men, frequently alluded to the erotic nature and appeal of bound feet in their poetry. The desirability varies with the size of the feet—the perfect bound feet and the most desirable (called 'golden lotuses') would be around 3 Chinese inches (around 10 cm or 4 in) or smaller, while those larger were called 'silver lotuses' (4 Chinese inches—around 13 cm or 5.1 in) or 'iron lotuses' (5 Chinese inches—around 17 cm or 6.7 in—or larger, and thus the least desirable for marriage). Therefore people had greater expectations for foot binding brides. The belief that foot binding made women more desirable to men is widely used as an explanation for the spread and persistence of foot binding.

Some also considered bound feet to be intensely erotic. Some men preferred never to see a woman's bound feet, so they were always concealed within tiny 'lotus shoes' and wrappings. According to Robert van Gulik, the bound feet were also considered the most intimate part of a woman's body. In erotic art of the Qing period where the genitalia may be shown, the bound feet were never depicted uncovered. Howard Levy, however, suggests that the barely revealed bound foot may also only function as an initial tease.

An effect of the bound feet was the lotus gait, the tiny steps and swaying walk of a woman whose feet had been bound. Women with such deformed feet avoided placing weight on the front of the foot and tended to walk predominantly on their heels. Walking on bound feet necessitated bending the knees slightly and swaying to maintain proper movement and balance, a dainty walk that was also considered to be erotically attractive to some men. Some men found the smell of the bound feet attractive and some also apparently believed that bound feet would cause layers of folds to develop in the vagina, and that the thighs would become sensuously heavier and the vagina tighter. The psychoanalyst Sigmund Freud considered foot binding to be a "perversion that corresponds to foot fetishism", and that it appeased male castration anxiety.

=== Role of Confucianism ===
During the Song dynasty, the status of women declined. A common argument is that it was the result of the revival of Confucianism as neo-Confucianism and that, in addition to promoting the seclusion of women and the cult of widow chastity, it also contributed to the development of foot binding. According to Robert van Gulik, the prominent Song Confucian scholar Zhu Xi stressed the inferiority of women as well as the need to keep men and women strictly separate. It was claimed by Lin Yutang among others, probably based on an oral tradition, that Zhu Xi also promoted foot binding in Fujian as a way of encouraging chastity among women; that by restricting their movement, it would help keep men and women separate. However, historian Patricia Ebrey suggests that this story might be fictitious, and argued that the practice arose so as to emphasize the gender distinction during a period of societal change in the Song dynasty.

Some Confucian moralists in fact disapproved of the erotic associations of foot binding, and unbound women were also praised. The Neo-Confucian Cheng Yi was said to be against foot binding and his family and descendants did not bind their feet. Modern Confucian scholars such as Tu Weiming also dispute any causal link between neo-Confucianism and foot binding, as Confucian doctrine prohibits mutilation of the body as people should not "injure even the hair and skin of the body received from mother and father". It is argued that such injunction applies less to women, rather it is meant to emphasize the sacred link between sons and their parents. Furthermore, it is argued that Confucianism institutionalized the family system in which women are called upon to sacrifice themselves for the good of the family, a system that fostered such practice.

Historian Dorothy Ko proposed that foot binding may be an expression of the Confucian ideals of civility and culture in the form of correct attire or bodily adornment, and that foot binding was seen as a necessary part of being feminine as well as being civilized. Foot binding was often classified in Chinese encyclopaedias as clothing or a form of bodily embellishment rather than mutilation. One from 1591, for example, placed foot binding in a section on "Female Adornments" that included hairstyles, powders, and ear piercings. According to Ko, the perception of foot binding as a civilized practice may be evinced from a Ming dynasty account that mentioned a proposal to "entice [the barbarians] to civilize their customs" by encouraging foot binding among their womenfolk. The practice was carried out only by women on girls, and it served to emphasize the distinction between male and female, an emphasis that began from an early age. Anthropologist Fred Blake argued that the practice of foot binding was a form of discipline undertaken by women themselves, and perpetuated by women on their daughters, so as to inform their daughters of their role and position in society, and to support and participate in the neo-Confucian way of being civilized.

=== Feminist perspective ===
Foot binding is considered an oppressive practice against women who were victims of a sexist culture. It is also widely seen as a form of violence against women. Bound feet rendered women dependent on their families, particularly the men, as they became largely restricted to their homes. Thus, the practice ensured that women were much more reliant on their husbands. The early Chinese feminist Qiu Jin, who underwent the painful process of unbinding her own bound feet, denounced foot binding and other traditional practices. She argued that women, by retaining their small bound feet, made themselves subservient by imprisoning themselves indoors. She believed that women should emancipate themselves from oppression, that girls could ensure their independence through education, and that they should develop new mental and physical qualities fitting for the new era. The end of the practice of foot binding is seen as a significant event in the process of female emancipation in China, and a major event in the history of Chinese feminism.

In the late 20th century, some feminists have pushed back against the prevailing Western critiques of foot binding, arguing that the presumption that foot binding was done solely for the sexual pleasure of men denies the agency and cultural influence of women. In many parts of late imperial China, women themselves played a central role in maintaining the practice and often viewed bound feet as a symbol of status and a means to secure advantageous marriages. Historical evidence, including women's poetry and personal writings, particularly those produced by women from elite families, suggests that some women expressed pride in their bound feet and incorporated the practice into prevailing ideals of femininity and self-worth. Historians have also emphasized the role of mothers in sustaining the practice. Rather than acting solely under male coercion, mothers often made pragmatic decisions to bind their daughters' feet in response to economic realities and social expectations. In certain regions, foot binding was associated with indoor labor such as spinning and weaving, allowing daughters to contribute economically to the household while conforming to ideals of respectability.

=== Other interpretations ===
Some scholars such as Laurel Bossen and Hill Gates reject the notion that bound feet in China were considered more beautiful, or that it was a means of male control over women, a sign of class status, or a chance for women to marry well (in general, bound women did not improve their class position by marriage). Foot binding is believed to have spread from elite women to civilian women and there were large differences in each region. The body and labor of unmarried daughters belonged to their parents, thereby the boundaries between work and kinship for women were blurred. They argued that foot binding was an instrumental means to reserve women to handwork, and can be seen as a way by mothers to tie their daughters down, train them in handwork, and keep them close at hand. This argument has been challenged by John Shepherd in his book Footbinding as Fashion, and shows there was no connection between handicraft industries and the proportion of women bound in Hebei.

Foot binding was common when women could do light industry, but where women were required to do heavy farm work they often did not bind their feet because it hindered physical work. Bossen and Gates argued that the coming of the mechanized industry at the end of the 19th century and the beginning of the 20th century, such as the introduction of industrial textile processes, resulted in a loss of light handwork for women, removing a reason to maintain the practice. Mechanization resulted in women who worked at home facing a crisis once machine-made yarn displaced home production. Coupled with changes in politics and people's consciousness, the practice of foot binding disappeared in China forever after two generations. More specifically, the 1842 Treaty of Nanjing (after the First Opium War) opened five cities as treaty ports where foreigners could live and trade. This led to foreign citizens residing in the area, where many proselytized as Christian missionaries. These foreigners condemned many long-standing Chinese cultural practices like foot binding as "uncivilized" – marking the beginning of the end for the centuries-long practice.

It has been argued that while the practice started out as a fashion, it persisted because it became an expression of Han identity after the Mongols invaded China in 1279, and later the Manchus' conquest in 1644, as it was then practised only by Han women. During the Qing dynasty, attempts were made by the Manchus to ban the practice but failed, and it has been argued the attempts at banning may have in fact led to a spread of the practice among Han Chinese in the 17th and 18th centuries. John Shepherd provides a critical review of the evidence cited for the notion that foot binding was an expression of "Han identity" and rejects this interpretation.

== In popular culture ==
The bound foot has played a prominent part in many media works, both Chinese and non-Chinese, modern and traditional. These depictions are sometimes based on observation or research and sometimes on rumors or supposition. Sometimes, as in the case of Pearl Buck's The Good Earth (1931), the accounts are relatively neutral or empirical, implying respect for Chinese culture. (Note: Though The Good Earth features neutral or empirical accounts of foot binding, Buck's previous novel, East Wind: West Wind, explored the unbinding of a woman's feet, experienced as frightening and painful yet finally empowering, as part of her transition into a new, more modern and more individualistic persona under her doctor husband's tutelage.) Sometimes, the accounts seem intended to rouse like-minded Chinese and foreign opinion to abolish the custom, and sometimes the accounts imply condescension or contempt for China.

- Quoted in the Jin Ping Mei (c. 1610): "displaying her exquisite feet, three inches long and no wider than a thumb, very pointed and with high insteps."
- Anna Bunina mentions the custom in her 1810 fable "Пекинское ристалище" ("The Peking Stadium"), which describes a Chinese woman attempting to run a race and barely finishing the boys' course, yet still getting applause for the effort. Bunina used the custom as an allegory to her own difficulties in getting recognition as a poet.
- Flowers in the Mirror (1837) by Ju-Chen Li includes chapters set in the "Country of Women", where men bear children and have bound feet.
- The Three-Inch Golden Lotus (1994) by Feng Jicai presents a satirical picture of the movement to abolish the practice, which is seen as part of Chinese culture.
- In the film The Inn of the Sixth Happiness (1958), Ingrid Bergman portrays Gladys Aylward, a British missionary to China who is assigned as a foreigner the task by a local Mandarin to unbind the feet of young women, an unpopular order that the civil government had failed to fulfill. Later, the children are able to escape troops by walking miles to safety.
- Ruthanne Lum McCunn wrote a biographical novel, Thousand Pieces of Gold (1981, adapted into a 1991 film), about Polly Bemis, a Chinese American pioneer woman. It describes her feet being bound and later unbound when she needed to help her family with farm labor.
- Emily Prager's short story "A Visit from the Footbinder", from her collection of short stories of the same name (1982), describes the last few hours of a young Chinese girl's childhood before the professional footbinder arrives to initiate her into the adult woman's life of beauty and pain.
- Jung Chang's family autobiography Wild Swans presents the story of Yu-Fang, the grandmother, who had bound feet from the age of two.
- Lisa Loomer's play The Waiting Room (1994) deals with themes of body modification. One of the three main characters is an 18th-century Chinese woman who arrives in a modern hospital waiting room, seeking medical help for complications resulting from her bound feet. She describes the foot-binding process, as well as the physical and psychological harm her bound feet have caused.
- Lensey Namioka's novel Ties That Bind, Ties That Break (1999) follows a girl named Ailin in China who refuses to have her feet bound, which comes to affect her future.
- Lisa See's novel Snow Flower and the Secret Fan (2005) is about two Chinese girls who are destined to be friends. The novel is based upon the sacrifices women make to be married and includes the two girls being forced into getting their feet bound. The book was adapted into a 2011 film directed by Wayne Wang.
- The Filipino horror film Feng Shui and its sequel Feng Shui 2 feature a ghost of a foot-bound woman inhabits a bagua and cursed those who holds the item.
- Sieglinde Sullivan in the manga series Black Butler had her feet bound when she was young as part of the "Emerald Witch" hoax invented by the German military.
- Lisa See's novel China Dolls (2014) describes Chinese family traditions including foot binding.
- Xiran Jay Zhao's novel Iron Widow (2021) is set in a futuristic world inspired by medieval China that still practices foot binding. The main character, Wu Zetian, had her feet bound in childhood and suffers from chronic pain due to it.
- Edward Rutherfurd's novel China: An Epic Novel, is set in late Qing Dynasty China, when foot binding was still common practice among Han Chinese in the north. Bright Moon, the daughter of a main character Mei-Ling, has her feet bound to increase her chances of a good marriage, and the practice is described in detail. The character soon resents that she has her feet bound, as it causes her severe pain, and stops her from participating in many activities.
- In episode 9 of the anime series The Apothecary Diaries, a servant girl is found dead in a moat. After an autopsy, it is found that she had her feet bound.
- Lisa See's novel Lady Tan's Circle of Women (2023) inspired by the life of Tan Yunxian also describes the tradition of foot binding for young girls.

== See also ==
- Artificial cranial deformation
- Body modification
- Corset controversy
- Foot Emancipation Society
- Hobble skirt
- High heels
- Women in ancient and imperial China

== References and further reading ==
- Berg, Eugene E. "Chinese Footbinding". Radiology Review – Orthopaedic Nursing. 24 (5): 66–67.
- Berger, Elizabeth; Yang, Liping; Ye, Wa (2019). "Foot binding in a Ming dynasty cemetery near Xi'an, China". International Journal of Paleopathology. 24: 79–88. Bibcode:2019IJPal..24...79B. doi:10.1016/j.ijpp.2018.09.005. PMID 30300764.
- Bossen, Laurel; Gates, Hill (2017). Bound Feet, Young Hands: Tracking the Demise of Footbinding in Village China. Stanford University Press. ISBN 978-0-8047-9955-3.
- Brown, Melissa J.; Satterthwaite-Phillips, Damian (2018). "Economic correlates of footbinding: Implications for the importance of Chinese daughters' labor". PLOS ONE. 13 (9) e0201337. Bibcode:2018PLoSO..1301337B. doi:10.1371/journal.pone.0201337. PMC 6147408. PMID 30235217.
- Brown, Melissa J.; Bossen, Laurel; Gates, Hill; Satterthwaite-Phillips, Damian (2012). "Marriage Mobility and Footbinding in Pre-1949 Rural China: A Reconsideration of Gender, Economics, and Meaning in Social Causation". The Journal of Asian Studies. 71 (4): 1035–1067. doi:10.1017/S0021911812001271. JSTOR 23357433.
- Brown, Melissa J. (2020). "Footbinding in Economic Context: Rethinking the Problems of Affect and the Prurient Gaze". Harvard Journal of Asiatic Studies. 80 (1): 179–214. doi:10.1353/jas.2020.0007.
- Cassel, Susie Lan (2007). "'...the Binding Altered Not only My Feet but My Whole Character': Footbinding and First-World Feminism in Chinese American Literature". Journal of Asian American Studies. 10 (1): 31–58. doi:10.1353/jaas.2007.0001.
- Gates, Hill (2014). Footbinding and Women's Labor in Sichuan. Routledge. ISBN 978-0-415-52592-3.
- Hong, Fan (1997). Footbinding, Feminism and Freedom. London: Frank Cass. ISBN 0-7146-4633-4.
- Hershatter, Gail (2018). Women and China's Revolutions. Rowman & Littlefield Publishers. ISBN 978-1-4422-1570-2.
- Hughes, Roxane (2017). Ambivalent Orientalism: Footbinding in Chinese American History, Culture and Literature (PDF) (PhD thesis). Université de Lausanne.
- Ko, Dorothy (2002). Every Step a Lotus: Shoes for Bound Feet. University of California Press. ISBN 978-0-520-23284-6.
- Ko, Dorothy (12 December 2005). Cinderella's Sisters: A Revisionist History of Footbinding. University of California Press. ISBN 978-0-520-94140-3.
- Ko, Dorothy (2008). "Perspectives on Foot-binding" (PDF). ASIANetwork Exchange. 15 (3). Archived from the original (PDF) on 3 December 2011.
- Rossabi, Morris (2014). A History of China (1st ed.). John Wiley & Sons.
- Shepherd, John R. (2016). "The Qing, the Manchus, and Footbinding: Sources and Assumptions Under Scrutiny". Frontiers of History in China. 11 (2): 279–322.
- Shepherd, John R. (2018). Footbinding as Fashion. Seattle: University of Washington Press. ISBN 978-0-295-74440-7.
- van Gulik, Robert Hans (1961). Sexual life in ancient China: A Preliminary Survey of Chinese Sex and Society from Ca. 1500 B.C. Till 1644 A.D. Brill. ISBN 90-04-03917-1.
- Wang, Ping (2002). Aching for Beauty: Footbinding in China. New York: Anchor Books.
- "Chinese Foot Binding – Lotus Shoes". The Museum of the City of San Francisco.

Attributution

- This article incorporates text from Encyclopædia of religion and ethics, Volume 8, by James Hastings, John Alexander Selbie, Louis Herbert Gray, a publication from 1916, now in the public domain in the United States.
- This article incorporates text from The religions of China: Confucianism and Tâoism described and compared with Christianity, by James Legge, a publication from 1880, now in the public domain in the United States.
