= Heavenly Foot Society =

Organization against foot binding in China

The Heavenly Foot Society was a Chinese organization against foot binding, founded in 1874. It was the first organization against foot binding in China.

It was founded by John Macgowan and his wife, missionaries from the London Missionary Society. It was followed by other Western Christian missionary societies, who incorporated the work against foot binding in to their missionary work. The Christian missionaries condemned foot binding as a barbaric custom oppressive of women. They banned foot binding among Christian Chinese, and banned women with bound feet to study or work in their missionary schools.

The Heavenly Foot Society and the other missionary societes against foot binding had limited effect because it associated the abolition of foot binding with religious missionary work. The first Chinese society against foot binding, the Foot Emancipation Society of 1887, and the first secular Western society, the Tian Zu Hui of 1895, had substantionally more success.
