= A Study of Confucius as a Reformer of Institutions =

Book written by Kang Youwei

- Author: Kang Youwei
- Language: Traditional Chinese
- Publication date: 1897
- Publication place: Qing dynasty

A Study of Confucius as a Reformer of Institutions or On Confucius as a Reformer (Chinese: 孔子改制考), also translated as A Study of Kongzi as a Reformer, A Study of Confucius as Reformist, is a book written by Kang Youwei that preaches the idea of "changing the institutions based on the teachings of the old times" (托古改制). The book was started in 1886 and first published in 1897 to suggest substantial changes to the imperial system of Qing dynasty.

The book dresses up the otherwise conservative Confucius as someone who is full of enterprising spirit and advocating democratic ideas and a notion of equality. According to Kang, Confucius was a visionary of institutional change who articulated a concept of progress that had been obscured by Old Text scholars.

After the publication of A Study of Confucius as a Reformer of Institutions, it yielded a tremendous social influence. Finally, the book was banned by the Qing government in 1898 and again in 1900 for political reasons.
