= A Study of the Forged Classics of the Xin Period =

- Author: Kang Youwei
- Language: Traditional Chinese
- Publication date: 1891
- Publication place: Qing dynasty

A Study of the Forged Classics of the Xin Period (Note: Also translated as A Treatise on Forged Classics, An Inquiry into the Classics Forged During the Xin Period, and Forged Classics of the Wang Mang Period.) (simplified Chinese: 新学伪经考; traditional Chinese: 新學偽經考; pinyin: Xinxue weijing kao) is a book written by Kang Youwei that critiques the Confucian Old Text School based on the authenticity of the Classics. The book argues that the subset of the Classics favored by Kang and the New Text School and produced during the Han dynasty are more authentic than the Old Text School believes due to the incompleteness of Qin-era censorship. Furthermore, the subset favored by the Old Text School are later Xin-era works written by Liu Xin with the goal of legitimizing the Xin dynasty. The book proposes that the Old Text School be renamed "New Learning" (pinyin: Xinxue).

Kang wrote the book to attack conservative political opponents in the Qing dynasty and support the case for reforms. The Old Text School was the orthodox Confucian interpretation in government, and used by conservatives to justify resistance to reforms. Kang was accused of misrepresenting the Old Text School, and plagiarizing Liao Ping.

The book was published in Guangzhou in August 1891 and was controversial. The Qing suppressed it in 1894, and again after the failure of the Hundred Days' Reform.
