= Kang Youwei =

Chinese political thinker and reformer (1858–1927)

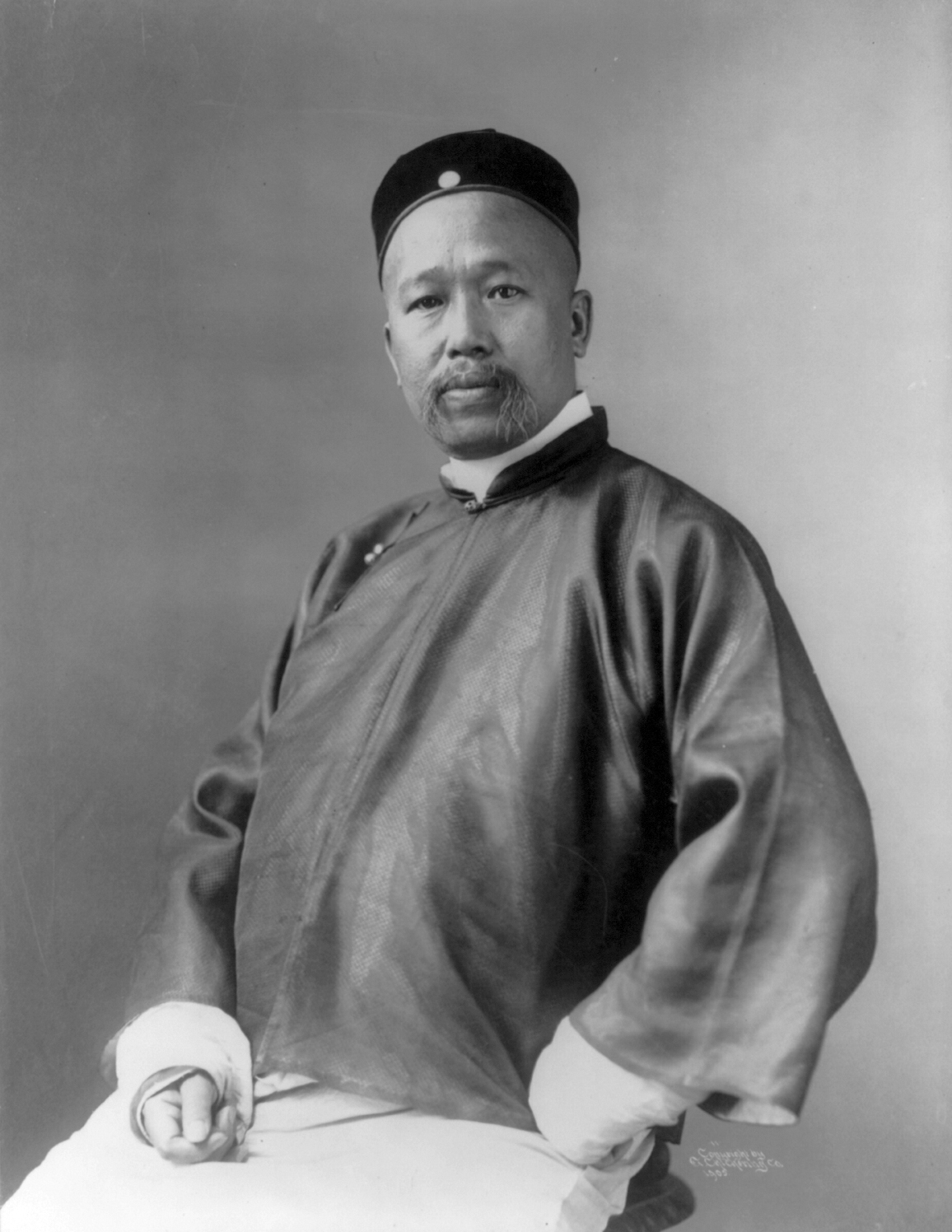
- Kang in 1905
- Born: 19 March 1858; Nanhai, Guangdong, Qing China
- Died: 31 March 1927 (aged 69); Qingdao, Shandong, Republic of China
- Education: Jinshi degree in the Imperial Examination
- Known for: Leader in the Gongche Shangshu movement Leader in the Hundred Days' Reform
- Notable work: The Reformations of Emperor Meiji (日本明治變政考), The Reformations of Peter the Great (俄大彼得變政記)
- Spouses: Zhang Yunzhu; Liang Xujiao; He Zhanli; Liao Dingzhen; Zhang Guang
- Children: 15 children, including Kang Tongbi
- Relatives: Kang Youpu (brother)

Chinese name
- Traditional Chinese: 康有為
- Simplified Chinese: 康有为
Transcriptions
Standard Mandarin
- Hanyu Pinyin: Kāng Yǒuwéi
- Wade–Giles: K‘ang^{1} Yu^{3}-wei^{2}
- IPA: [kʰáŋ jòʊ.wěɪ]
Yue: Cantonese
- Yale Romanization: Hōng Yáuh-wàih
- Jyutping: Hong^{1} Jau^{5} Wai^{4}
- Hong Kong Romanisation: Hong Yau-wai
- IPA: [hɔŋ˥ jɐw˩˧.wɐj˩]

- Other names

Courtesy name (zi)
- Traditional Chinese: 廣廈
- Hanyu Pinyin: Guǎngshà¹
- Jyutping: Gwong2 Haa6

Art name (hao)
- Traditional Chinese: 長素
- Hanyu Pinyin: Chángsù
- Jyutping: Coeng4 Sou3

Chinese name
- Traditional Chinese: 明夷
- Hanyu Pinyin: Míngyí
- Jyutping: Ming4 Ji4

Chinese name
- Traditional Chinese: 更生 or 更甡
- Hanyu Pinyin: Gēngshēng
- Jyutping: Gang1 Sang1

Chinese name
- Traditional Chinese: 西樵山人
- Hanyu Pinyin: Xīqiáo Shānrén
- Jyutping: Sai1 Ciu4 Saan1 Jan4

Chinese name
- Traditional Chinese: 游存叟
- Hanyu Pinyin: Yóucúnsǒu
- Jyutping: Jau4 Cyun4 Sau2

Chinese name
- Traditional Chinese: 天游化人
- Hanyu Pinyin: Tiānyóu Huàrén
- Jyutping: Tin1 Jau4 Faa3 Jan4
- ¹ K'ang Yu-wei: A Biography and a Symposium gives Guǎngxià 廣夏

Kang Youwei (19 March 1858 – 31 March 1927) was a Chinese political thinker and reformer in the late Qing dynasty. His increasing closeness to and influence over the young Guangxu Emperor sparked conflict between the emperor and his adoptive mother, the regent Empress Dowager Cixi. His ideas were influential in the abortive Hundred Days' Reform. Following the coup by Cixi that ended the reform, Kang was forced to flee. He continued to advocate for a Chinese constitutional monarchy after the founding of the Republic of China.

== Early life ==
Kang was born on 19 March 1858 in Su Village, Danzao Town, Nanhai County, Guangdong province (now the Nanhai District of Foshan City). His family had produced scholars for thirteen consecutive generations. His great-great-grandfather, Kang Bingtang, was recognized as a master of Neo-Confucianism in Guangdong. His grandfather, Kang Zanxiu, served as an educational official in Lianzhou, and his father, Kang Dachu, was an acting magistrate in Jiangxi. Furthermore, his grand-uncle, Kang Guoqi, held the high-ranking position of acting governor of Guangxi. Kang was raised in an environment saturated with Confucian values and literary appreciation. His family home, "Yan Xiang Lao Wu," was built by his great-grandfather and filled with books and historical records. Kang took great pride in this heritage, later writing poems to commemorate his family's long history of scholarship.

According to his autobiography, his intellectual gifts were recognized in his childhood by his uncle. By the age of five, he was already able to recite hundreds of Tang Dynasty poems. At age six, he began formal study of the core Confucian classics. After his father passed away when Kang was eleven, his grandfather, Kang Zanxiu, took charge of his upbringing. He subjected Kang to a rigorous and traditional education. Under this guidance, Kang expanded his studies beyond the classics to include history and administrative records. The suppression of the Taiping Rebellion and the careers of prominent statesmen like Zeng Guofan, Luo Bingzhang, and Zuo Zongtang deeply inspired him. However, as a teenager, he was dissatisfied with the scholastic system of his time, especially its emphasis on preparing for the eight-legged essays, which were artificial literary exercises required as part of the examinations.

Studying for exams was an extraordinarily rigorous activity, so he engaged in Buddhist meditation as a form of relaxation, an unusual leisure activity for a Chinese scholar of his time. It was during one of these meditations that he had a mystical vision that became the theme for his intellectual pursuits throughout his life. Believing that it was possible to read every book and "become a sage", he embarked on a quasi-messianic pursuit to save humanity.

== Biography ==
Kang called for an end to property and the family in the interest of an idealized future cosmopolitan utopia and cited Confucius as an example of a reformer and not as a reactionary, as many of his contemporaries did. In his work A Study of Confucius as a Reformer of Institutions, he discussed the latter point in great detail. He argued, to bolster his claims, that the rediscovered versions of the Confucian classics were forged; he expounded this idea in detail in A Study of the Forged Classics of the Xin Period.

In 1879, he met Zhang Dinghua, a scholar-official from Beijing whose deep knowledge of contemporary affairs and "new books" exposed Kang to early reformist trends. In the same year, Kang traveled to Hong Kong and was shocked by the prosperity there, which started his interest in Western culture and thoughts. These observations also shattered his traditional view of Westerners as "barbarians," convincing him that Western nations possessed systematic methods of governance that were superior to the stagnant practices of the Qing dynasty. In 1882, Kang went to Beijing to take the imperial examination. While returning home, he stopped over in Shanghai and bought many Western books there, and started developing his ideology based on these writings. He was influenced by Protestant Christianity in his quest for reform.

In 1883, Kang founded the Anti-Footbinding Society near Canton. Following the outbreak of the Sino-French War in 1884, Kang returned to his hometown in Su Village to escape the unrest. Influenced by the national crisis and his burgeoning interest in Western natural sciences, he began drafting his earliest philosophical treatises. In 1885, he started writing Renlei Gongli, a work that utilized geometric methods to argue for universal human equality. By 1887, he had expanded these ideas into the Neiwai Pian (Inner and Outer Chapters), which envisioned an egalitarian society free from the constraints of absolute monarchy and gender inequality. He also authored Jiaoxue Tongyi in 1886, which advocated for a practical educational system designed to serve statecraft rather than abstract academic debates.

In 1888, alarmed by the foreign encroachment on China's southwestern frontier that followed the Sino-French War, Kang used a trip to the capital for the Shuntian provincial examination to submit his First Memorial to Emperor Guangxu. In this document, Kang proposed three major reforms: "Changing Ancestral Laws" to modernize the state, "Communicating the People's Feelings" to bridge the gap between the ruler and the ruled, and "Prudence in Choosing Advisors". However, the memorial was blocked by conservative officials, such as Xu Tong, and never reached the Emperor’s hands.

Kang realized that to convince the scholar-official class of the need for reform, he required a more powerful theoretical framework based on the Confucian classics themselves. He subsequently abandoned his lifelong devotion to the "Old Text" scholarship, such as the Zhou Li, which he began to view as stagnant and irrelevant to the national crisis. He turned instead to the New Text (Jinwen) school, specifically the Gongyang commentary. To vent his political frustrations during this time, he also authored Guang Yizhou Shuangji (廣藝舟雙楫, a highly influential work on calligraphy and stele inscriptions.

In the spring of 1890, Kang moved to Guangzhou. His growing reputation for innovative scholarship attracted Chen Qianqiu (also known as Chen Tongfu), a student from the Xuehai Academy, who visited Kang and was immediately won over by his ideas. In the autumn of that year, Chen introduced his friend Liang Qichao to Kang. Liang, who had achieved the juren degree at a young age, arrived with a "sense of pride" in his mastery of traditional philology and literature. However, during the encounter, Kang systematically dismantled and criticized the traditional academic styles that Liang had been pursuing. Liang Qichao later described the experience as feeling like "cold water being poured down his back". The very next day, Liang formally requested to become Kang’s student and was accepted.

At the request of his students, Kang opened the Wanmu Caotang academy, which served as a training ground for the "backbone" of the future reform movement. To provide a theoretical justification for radical change, Kang published Xinxue Weijing Kao (Study of the Forged Classics of the Xin Period) in 1891 and began drafting Kongzi Gaizhi Kao (Study of Confucius as a Reformer). These works argued that the conservative "Old Text" classics were forgeries and that Confucius himself was a reformer who mended ancient traditions to improve the present.

Kang Youwei launched the Qiangxue hui ("Society for the Study of National Strengthening") in Beijing. It was the first political group established by reformists in China. Through it, Kang became acquainted with Governor-General Zhang Zhidong and received his financial support to inaugurate the Qiangxue bao ("Journal of the Society for the Study of the National Strengthening") in January 1896. In the same month, the society was dissolved and the journal had to cease publication.

Kang was a strong believer in constitutional monarchy and wanted to remodel the country after Meiji Japan. These ideas angered his colleagues in the scholarly class who regarded him as a heretic.

In 1895, China was defeated by Japan in the First Sino-Japanese War. In protest against the Treaty of Shimonoseki, Kang Youwei, Liang Qichao, and over 600 civil examination candidates signed a petition to the Guangxu Emperor, known to history as the Gongche Shangshu movement. This movement is taken as the sign of the appearance of reformists and the start of Chinese mass political movements. In Kang's view, China "would not have been willing to reform some wholeheartedly if it had not experienced the 1895 war, which hurt it so badly and caused such nerve-wracking pain."

Kang and his noted student, Liang Qichao, were important participants in a 1898 campaign to modernize China now known as the Hundred Days' Reform. The reforms introduced radical change into the Chinese government. In July 1898, Kang Youwei persuaded the Emperor to issue an edict confiscating folk religion temples which were not performing state sacrifices and turn them into schools. The temple confiscations were shortly reversed. The policy set a precedent for future campaigns in China.

Empress Dowager Cixi staged a coup that put an end to the Hundred Days' Reforms, put the Guangxu Emperor under house arrest, and ordered Kang's arrest and execution on the basis that he had tried to have her assassinated. Kang fled the country, but also organized the Protect the Emperor Society which promoted the cause of the Guangxu Emperor, mainly in Chinese diaspora communities, and advocated the removal of Cixi. Kang relied on his principal American military advisor, General Homer Lea, to head the military branch of the Protect the Emperor Society. Kang traveled throughout the world to promote his ideas. He competed with the revolutionary leader Sun Yat-sen's Revive China Society and Revolutionary Alliance for funds and followers among overseas Chinese.

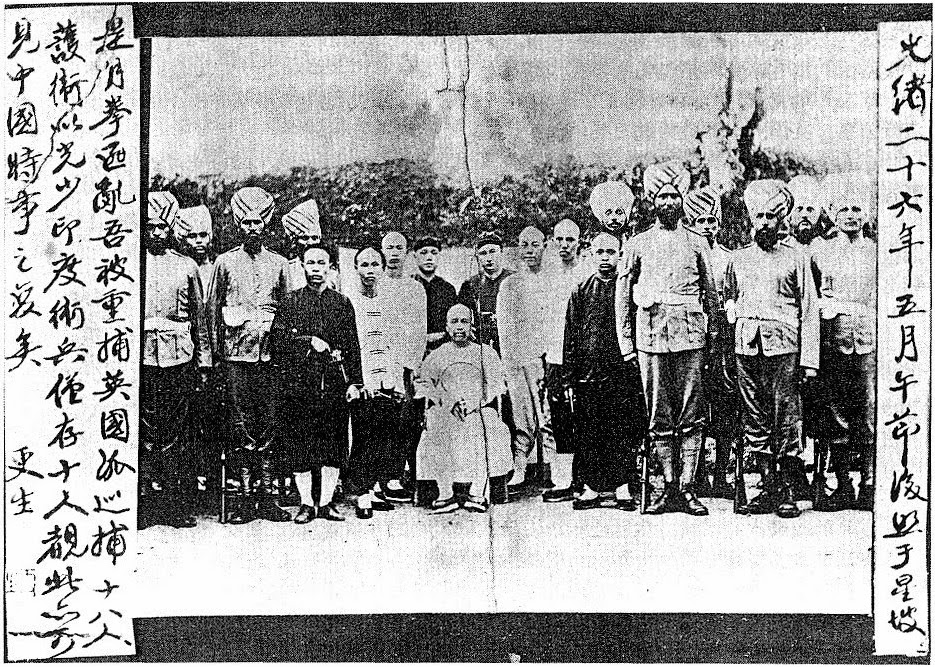
Kang Youwei photographed with his Sikh guards in Singapore

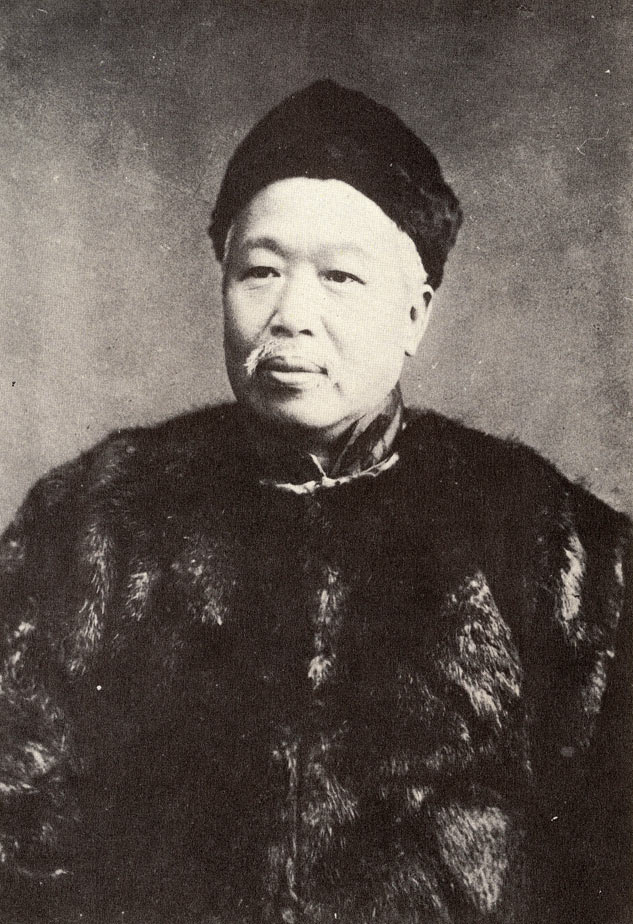
Kang Youwei, circa unknown

Kang visited India twice, first in 1901–1903 and then again in October 1909, in part to study India, which he regarded as comparable to China. Although his information about Indian history was derived from English authors, he observed that India's plight as a colonised country was due to the disunity among the different regions of India.

The Xinhai Revolution led to the abdication of the Qing dynasty and the establishment of a republic under Sun Yat-sen in 1912. Kang opposed the creation of a republic.

Some advocated that a Han be installed as Emperor: either the current Duke Yansheng (the recognized descendant of Confucius) – which Kang briefly endorsed before dropping the idea and returning to the idea of a Qing monarch; or the Marquis of Extended Grace (the recognized Ming dynasty descendant).

Kang remained an advocate of constitutional monarchy and launched a failed coup d'état in 1917. General Zhang Xun and his queue-wearing soldiers occupied Beijing, declaring a restoration of Emperor Puyi on 1 July.

The incident was a major miscalculation. The nation was highly anti-monarchist. Kang became suspicious of Zhang's insincere constitutionalism and feared he was merely using the restoration to become the power behind the throne. He abandoned his mission and fled to the American legation. On 12 July, Duan Qirui easily occupied the city.

Kang's reputation serves as an important barometer for the political attitudes of his time. In the span of less than twenty years, he went from being regarded as an iconoclastic radical to an anachronistic pariah.

Chinese-British biographer Jung Chang gave Kang Youwei unfavorable criticism due to his role in spreading numerous stories vilifying the Empress Dowager. These included accusations that Cixi murdered Empress Dowager Ci'an, drove her own son (the Tongzhi Emperor) to death, and misappropriated naval funds. Chang asserted that Kang Youwei was a "master propagandist" who also intended to become Emperor by posing as the reincarnation of Confucius, but later abandoned that plan.

== Datong Shu ==
Kang's best-known and probably most controversial work is Datong Shu (大同書). The title of the book derives from the name of a society modeled on the period of "three dynasties" as imagined by Confucius, but it literally means "The Book of Great Unity". The ideas of this book appeared in his lecture notes from 1884. Encouraged by his students, he worked on this book for the next two decades, but it was not until his exile in India that he finished the first draft. The first two chapters of the book were published in Japan in the 1900s, but the book was not published in its entirety until 1935, about seven years after his death.

Kang drew a historical theory of world order which, projected into future, outlines world unification, and combined a future unified world with his utopian ideas. His historical theory points to a millennia-long trend towards ever-larger empires.

Finally, the present powers of the world were formed. This process [of coalescing and forming fewer, larger units] has all taken place among the 10,000 countries over several thousand years. The progression from dispersion to union among men, and the principle [whereby] the world is [gradually] proceeding from being partitioned off to being opened up, is a spontaneous [working] of the Way of Heaven (or Nature) and human affairs.

Kang also made predictions about future trends towards world unification.

"The trend of imperial expansions will culminate with the contest between Germany and the United States."

The author of a more famous One World, the 1940 presidential candidate, Wendell Willkie, similarly stated that either Berlin will be capital of the world, or Washington. Contrary to his Western contemporaries, commented Historian Max Ostrovsky, Kang belonged to a civilization which experienced millennia-long universal unity. He knew how it was unified and several times reunified. Naturally, his theory of the world unification is more sound than the abstract ideas of the "Federation of the world" by his Western contemporary colleagues. Kang divided history on three basic periods — prehistory, history till the moment of unification which is still to come, and future period of One World — and designed a table on several pages of features corresponding to each period. His later German colleague, Karl Jaspers, independently designed three perfectly corresponding stages of history which he called prehistory, history and world or planetary history.

The future unified world, in Kang's utopian design, would be democratically ruled by one central government. In his scheme, the world would be split into rectangular administrative districts, which would be self-governing under a direct democracy but loyal to a central world government. There would also be the dissolution of racial boundaries. Kang outlines an immensely ambitious, and equally inhumane, eugenics program that would eliminate the "brown and black" racial phenotype after a millennium and lead to the emergence of a fair-skinned homogeneous human race whose members would "be the same color, the same appearance, the same size, and the same intelligence." Some of the methods envisioned for achieving this end included forced relocation to colder regions inhabited by whites coupled with sterilization of those suffering from diseases or whose mental and/or physical attributes were deemed exceptionally grotesque. One of the more humane tactics involved giving distinctive honors to white and yellow people who were willing to "improve humanity" by procreating with their brown and black counterparts. It is worth noting that although Kang felt that the white and yellow phenotype could coexist in his ideal scheme, he ultimately felt that white was nonetheless superior to yellow, and that the latter under ideal circumstances could be eliminated within the span of a century (prior to the advent of the "Great Unity").

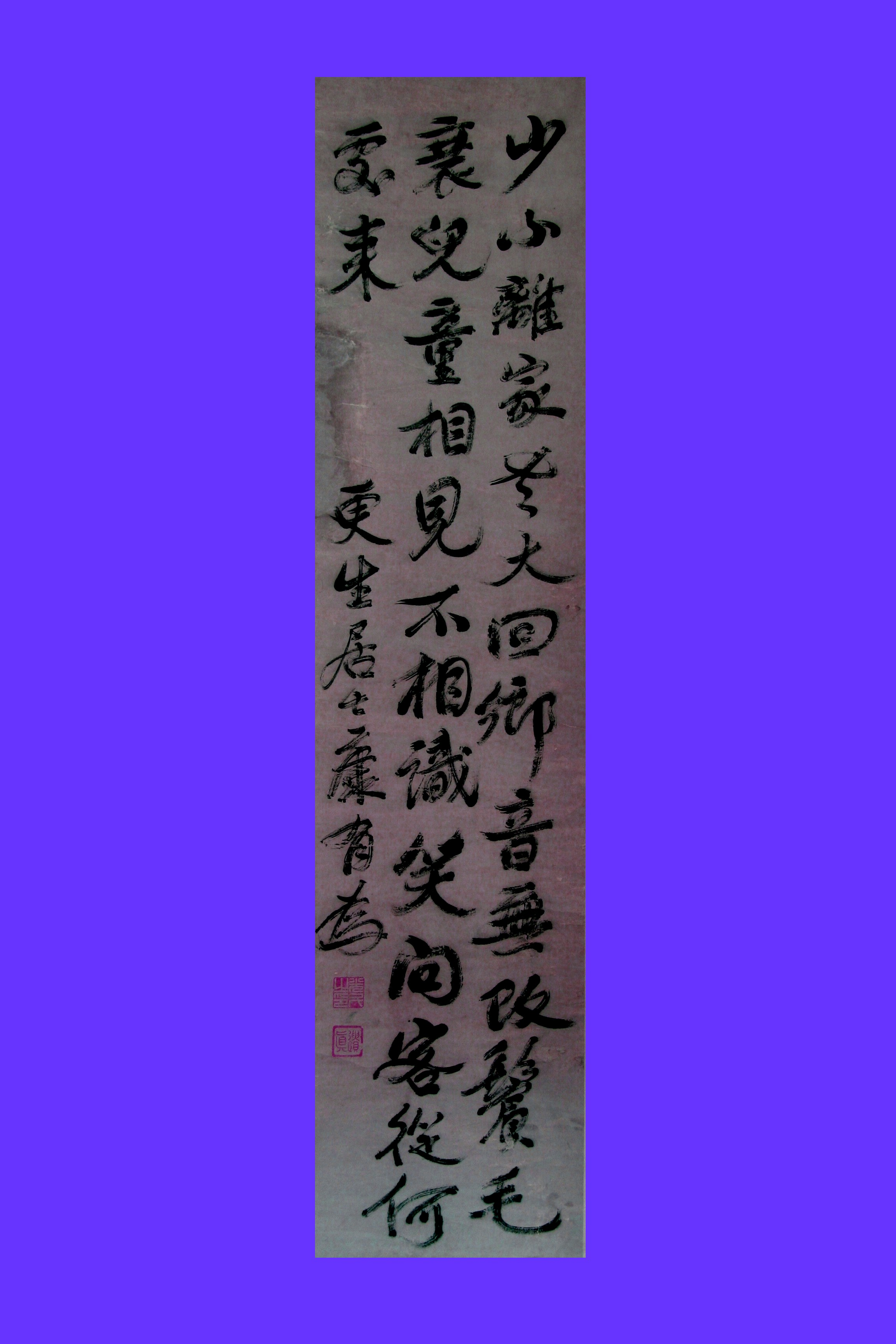
Tang Poem: Returning Home As An Unrecognized Old Man, Nantoyōsō Collection, Japan

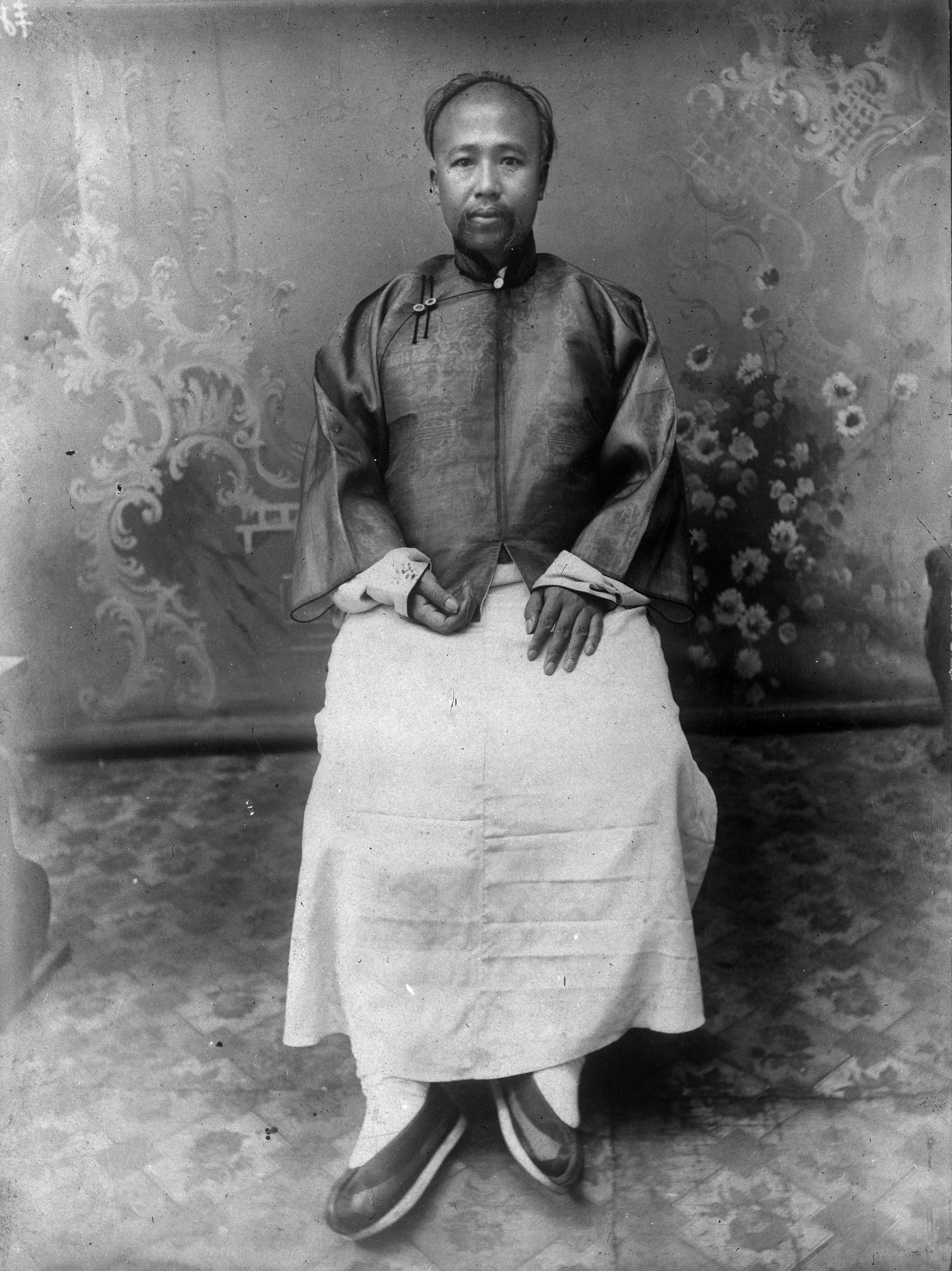
Kang Youwei, circa 1920

Kang wrote that the traditional family structure should be abolished and that women and men should sign one year marriage contracts, thereby allowing for flexible and voluntary relationships. His desire to end the traditional Chinese family structure defines him as an early advocate of women's independence in China. He reasoned that the institution of the family practiced by society since the beginning of time was a great cause of strife.

The family would be replaced by state-run institutions, such as womb-teaching institutions, nurseries and schools. Marriage would be replaced by one-year contracts between a woman and a man. Kang considered the contemporary form of marriage, in which a woman was trapped for a lifetime, to be too oppressive. Kang believed in equality between men and women and that there should be no social barrier barring women from doing whatever men can do.

Kang saw capitalism as an inherently evil system. He believed that government should establish socialist institutions to overlook the welfare of each individual. At one point, he even advocated that government should adopt the methods of "communism" although it is debated what Kang meant by this term.

In this spirit, in addition to establishing government nurseries and schools to replace the institution of the family, he also envisioned government-run retirement homes for the elderly. It is debated whether Kang's socialist ideas were inspired more by Western thought or by traditional Confucian ideals.

Laurence G. Thompsom believes that his socialism was based on traditional Chinese ideals. His work is permeated with the Confucian ideal of ren (仁), or humanity. However, Thompson also noted a reference by Kang to Fourier. Thus, some Chinese scholars believe that Kang's socialist ideals were influenced by Western intellectuals after his exile in 1898.

Notable in Kang's Datong Shu were his enthusiasm for and his belief in bettering humanity through technology, unusual for a Confucian scholar during his time. He believed that Western technological progress had a central role in saving humanity. While many scholars of his time continued to maintain the belief that Western technology should be adopted only to defend China against the West, he seemed to whole-heartedly embrace the modern idea that technology is integral for advancing mankind. Before anything of modern scale had been built, he foresaw a global telegraphic and telephone network. He also believed that as a result of technological advances, each individual would only need to work three or four hours per day, a prediction that would be repeated by the most optimistic futurists later in the 20th century.

When the book was first published, it was received with mixed reactions. Kang's support for the Guangxu Emperor was seen as reactionary by many Chinese intellectuals, who believed that Kang's book was an elaborate joke and that he was merely acting as an apologist for the emperor as to how a utopian paradise could have developed if the Qing dynasty had been maintained. Others believe that Kang was a bold and daring protocommunist, who advocated modern Western socialism and communism. Amongst the latter was Mao Zedong, who admired Kang and his socialist ideals in the Datong Shu.

Modern Chinese scholars now often take the view that Kang was an important advocate of Chinese socialism. Despite the controversy, Datong Shu still remains popular. A Beijing publisher included it on the list of 100 most influential books in Chinese history.

== Philosophical views ==
Kang enumerated sources of human suffering in a way similar to that of Buddhism.

The sufferings associated with man's physical life are: being implanted in the womb, premature death, loss of a limb, being a barbarian, living outside China, being a slave, and being a woman.

The sufferings associated with natural disasters are: famine resulting from flood or drought, epidemic, conflagration, flood, volcanic eruptions, collapse of buildings, shipwreck, and locust plagues.

The sufferings associated with the human relationship are: being a widow, being orphaned or childless, being ill with no one to provide medical care, suffering poverty, and having a low and mean station in life.

The sufferings associated with society are: corporal punishment and imprisonment, taxation, military conscription, social stratification, oppressive political institutions, the existence of the state, and the existence of the family.

The human feelings which cause suffering are: stupidity, hatred, fatigue, lust, attachment to things, and desire.

The things that cause suffering because of the esteem in which they are held are: wealth, eminent position, longevity, being a ruler, and being a spiritual leader.

Kang also visualised a hierarchy of various religions, in which Christianity and Islam were considered the lowest, above them being Confucianism, Taoism and Buddhism. He predicted that the lower religions would eventually disappear in the future.

== Calligraphy ==
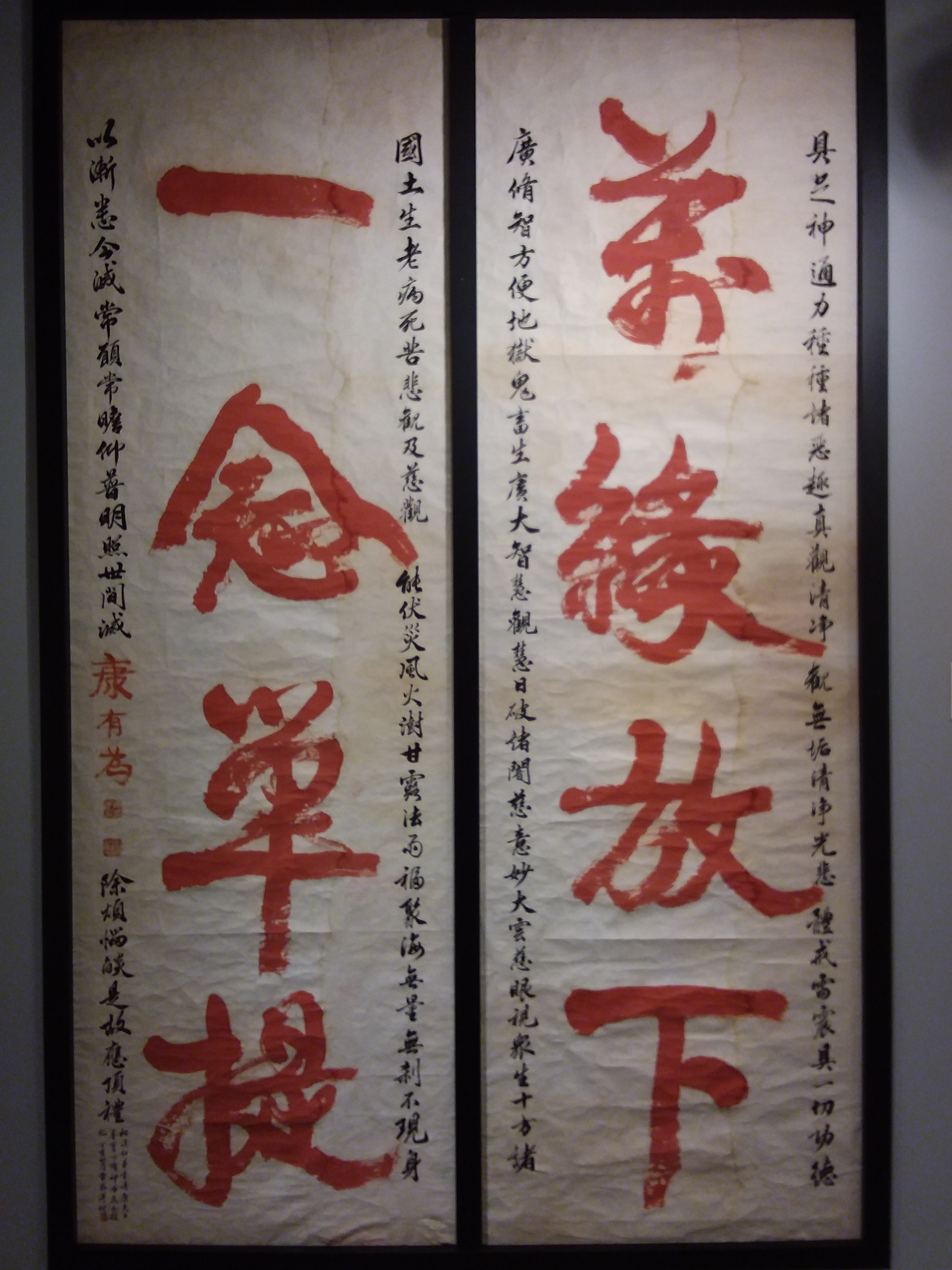
Kang Youwei's calligraphy work.

Kang was an accomplished calligrapher, responsible for the creation of Kang Typeface (Bad Model; 破体). He commended tablet calligraphy and depreciated model calligraphy. In his early years, he learned from Ouyang Xun by imitation. In his work Guang yizhoushuangji (广艺舟双楫), he did comprehensive and systematic research and introduction about tablet calligraphy. In Kang's later years, selling calligraphy became his most reliable source of income.

== Kang Youwei Island ==
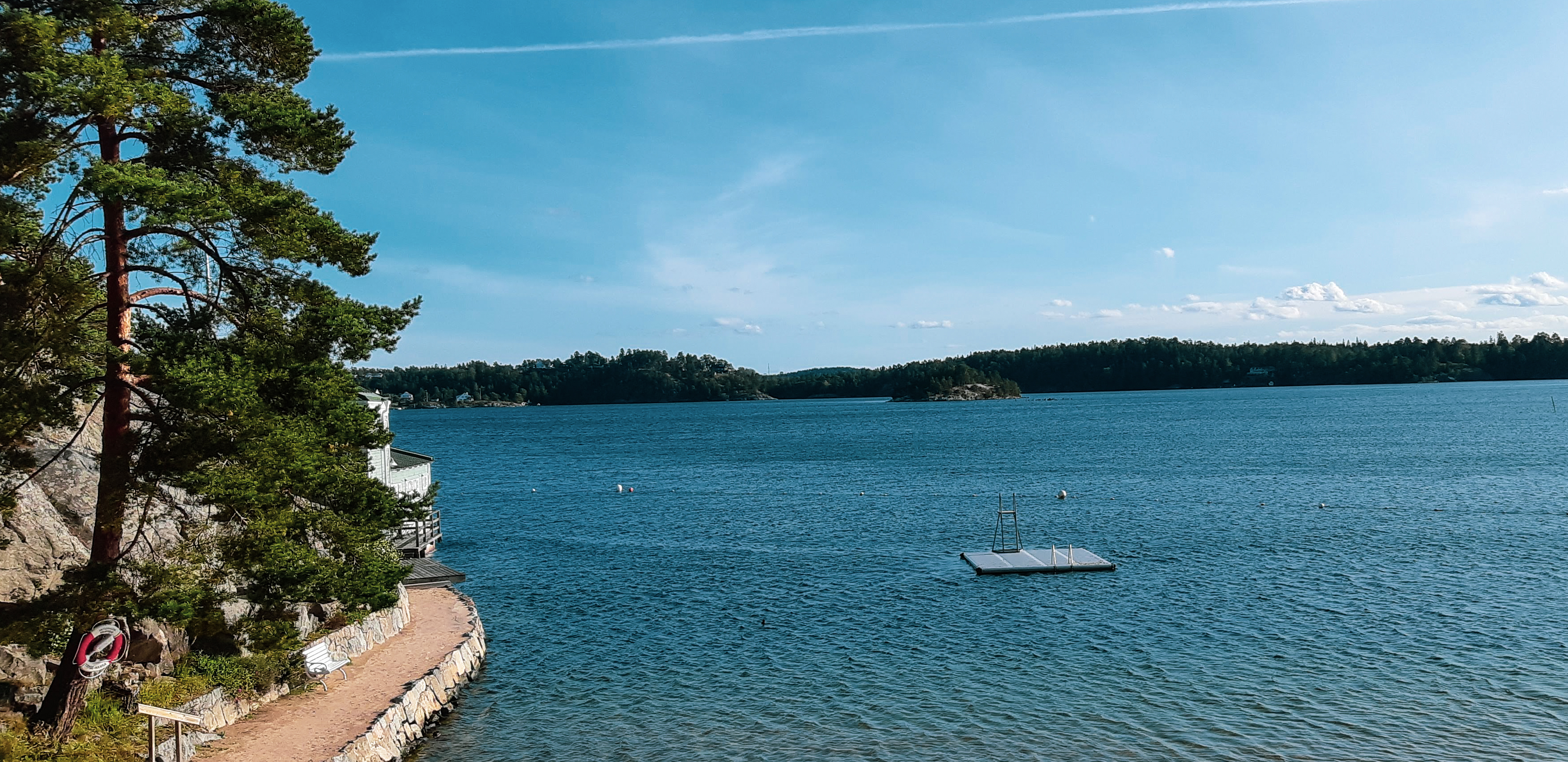
Korsholmen, also named Kang Youwei Island in Chinese.

After the failure of the Hundred Days' Reform, Kang fled China. In 1898, he arrived in Japan via Hong Kong. Kang reached Sweden in 1904 and was deeply attracted to the landscape. He bought an islet off Saltsjöbaden and built a Chinese style garden and building named "Beihai Caotang" (北海草堂). This island is still known as Kang Youwei Island by many Chinese.

== Death ==
Kang died at his home in the city of Qingdao, Shandong in 1927. He was 69.

== In other languages ==
- Chi Wen-shun, K'ang Yu-wei (1858–1927) (in Die Söhne des Drachen. Chinas Weg vom Konfuzianismus zum Kommunismus, ed. P. J. Opitz, Mchn. 1974, S. 83–109).
- Franke, W. Die staatspolitischen Reformversuche K'ang Yu-weis u. seiner Schule. Ein Beitrag zur geistigen Auseinandersetzung Chinas mit dem Abendlande (in Mitt. des Seminars für Orientalische Sprachen, Bln. 38, 1935, Nr. 1, S. 1–83).
- Kuang Bailin, Kang Youwei di zhexue sixiang, Peking 1980.
- G. Sattler-v. Sivers, Die Reformbewegung von 1898 (in Chinas große Wandlung. Revolutionäre Bewegungen im 19. u. 20. Jh., ed. P. J. Opitz, Mchn. 1972, S. 55–81).
- Tang Zhijun, Kang Youwei yu wuxu bianfa, Peking 1984. – Ders., Wuxu bianfa shi, Peking 1984.
- Wuxu weixin yundong shi lunji, ed. Hu Shengwu, Changsha 1983.

== See also ==
- Gongche Shangshu movement
- Lawrence M. Kaplan. Homer Lea: American Soldier of Fortune. University Press of Kentucky, 2010. ISBN 978-0813126166.
