= Tian Zu Hui =

Chinese anti-foot binding organization

The Tian Zu Hui (Natural Foot Society) was a Chinese organization against foot binding, founded in 1895. It was the first secular mass organization against foot binding in China.

It was founded by ten women of different nationalities under the leadership of Alicia Little in Shanghai in 1895. There had been many anti-foot binding societies since the foundation of the Heavenly Foot Society in 1874, but with the exception of the Chinese Foot Emancipation Society, they mainly functioned within Christian missionary societies, focused on Christian converts, and were not successful. The Natural Foot Society was strictly secular, and welcomed members of all religions and nationalities.

The Natural Foot Society campaigned by way of lecture tours, information, pamphlets and name lists. They focused on the non-Christian Chinese upper class elite and engaged Chinese upper-class women, which was a new method. In contrast to previous societies which had condemned foot binding in connection to religion, it spoke of the health issues connected to foot binding. It wrote a petition to the Regent Dowager Empress Cixi, said to be signed by all Western women in Asia. Cixi did introduce a ban on foot binding in 1902, but it could not be enforced.

The Natural Foot Society achieved considerable success. It was an umbrella organization which founded and included local branches, and became a significant national organization. Gradually more and more Chinese women joined the movement, and in 1907, the originally Western leadership transformed the leadership of the Natural Foot Society to Chinese women and acknowledge this to be a success of their campaign. Through the campaign of the movement, the foot binding custom diminished in many of the provinces in which the society campaigned, a success noted by the society. They continued with the campaign until the custom was finally banned in 1911–1912.
