= Daisy Kwok =

Chinese-Australian author

Daisy Alma Kwok (née Bew) (Chinese: 郭婉莹) (2 April 1909 - 25 September 1998) was a second generation Chinese-Australian woman and daughter of successful businessman George Kwok Bew. Her family moved to Shanghai following an increase of xenophobia in Australia following the introduction of the White Australia policy.

Kwok remained in China following the Chinese Communist Revolution and, from the 1950s to the 1970s, was impoverished and forced to work in low paid conditions to repay the accused debts of her family.

Following her death Kwok's memoirs were compiled and published as: Shanghai princess: her survival with pride & dignity (2010).

== Life in Australia ==
Kwok was the daughter of George Kwok Bew who, at the time of her birth, ran a highly successful fruit and vegetable wholesaler Wing Sang and Co. (Chinese: 永生果阑) which was based in Sydney. Kwok's mother was Darling Bew (née Tin Young) (who was also from a Cantonese background) and she was their seventh child. Kwok spent the early years of her life in the Sydney suburb of Petersham where she lived with her family in a luxurious home described as sprawling. Later, Kwok would recall eating Western style food and having Australian maids. Despite the wealth of the family Kwok was not protected from racism and, throughout her childhood, was called many names and that, for this reason, she refused to attend Sunday School.

As a businessman her father held considerable influence and was heavily involved in petitioning against the Immigration Restriction Act 1901 (which was unsuccessful) and, as a part of this activism, he founded the Australian chapter of the Chinese Empire Reform Association in 1901. Despite this Bew later switched his support to Sun Yat-sen, a Chinese republican revolutionary, and in 1917, on his invitation, relocated his family to Shanghai (China).

Many other Chinese-Australians also moved to Shanghai in this period and, before the move, Kwok could not understand Chinese languages as it had been banned in the family home.

== Life in Shanghai ==
In Shanghai Bew opened a Wing On department store as well as becoming the managing director of the company and, for a period of time, the family lived in a luxurious hotel there before moving into a mansion on the outskirts of the International Settlement. Initially Kwok was enrolled into a Cantonese school for the children of ‘returned overseas Chinese’ (Chinese: 歸國華僑) and she struggled there due, in part, to not being able to speak Cantonese or Shanghainese. Because of this she transferred to the McTyeire School, which was run by American missionaries, and she neglected her language studies and continues to primarily speak English throughout her life. This would become a great regret of hers but said that it then seemed more important to know English than Chinese.

As Kwok grew older she was increasingly expected to be a 'visual and moral representation' of the Wing On brand and was put 'on show'. As a part of this she had to ensure that she was always dressed in the latest fashions and attending the right shows and parties; because of this she became a prominent socialite and quasi celebrity. In this period she was once admonished by her brother for not purchasing clothing during a visit to the store in front of a crowd that had gathered to watch her shop.

In 1949 Kwok was still living in Shanghai during the Chinese Communist Revolution, and Mao Zedong coming to power. At this point in her life Kwok had married Woo Yu-Hsiang (and they had two children known as Loly and Deedums) and, alongside him, she was running a successful scientific instruments company, and because of this they, unlike many of their family members, decided not to leave China. They also shared the belief that the 1950s would be China's golden age and that they had nothing to fear from the Communist Party.

This proved not to be the case and, in the late 1950s, her husband was arrested for defrauding the state and sent to Tilanqiao Prison and, following his sentencing, Kwok was ordered to repay their money and all of their property was confiscated; this included Kwok's jewellery, clothing, wedding dress and photo albums. Kwok was also unable to see her husband until, in 1960, she was asked to identify his body following his death in prison.

Additionally Kwok was made to work on a farm in the northeast, where it was her job to feed the pigs and clean the toilets, as a part of an effort to ‘reform her capitalist mindset through [labour]’. Later she was sent the Chongming Island where she worked in a factory peeling frozen cabbages; Kwok would later attribute her development of arthritis to the work. In her memoir Kwok recalled:

Once they held a big meeting with over a hundred people present to accuse me of my crimes. I sat in front facing the group while different people got up to talk. The things they accused me of were so fantastic that I began enjoying listening to them.

— Daisy Kwok, Shanghai Princess (2010)

Life improved for Kwok following the US-China reproachment in the early 1970s, with the new demand for people with English language skills and English teachers. She put these skills to work at the Australian Consulate in Shanghai when it reopened in 1987 and she began assisting staff there and working to translate documents and teach them Chinese language. This was despite the lack of assistance they had offered her, both before and after, it closed in 1951.

In 1989, at the age of 81, and despite being born there, Kwok was granted Australian citizenship and her passport was reissued at a ceremony held at the Consulate. In the same year Kwok began writing her memoir but was not able to finish them before her death in 1998. After her death these were compiled by Chen Danyan and they became a bestseller in China. These were also later translated into English by Mavis Gock Ming, a Chinese-Australian historian and childhood friend of Kwok's, which led to the publication of the English language version Shanghai princess: her survival with pride & dignity / by Chen Danyan; [translation by Mavis Gock Yen] (2010).
