= Industrial and Commercial Bank =

Industrial and Commercial Bank may refer to:

- Industrial and Commercial Bank of China (ICBC), the largest state-owned bank in China
- Industrial and Commercial Bank of China (Asia), the Hong Kong-subsidiary of ICBC
- Hong Kong Industrial and Commercial Bank, a defunct bank of Hong Kong, now China Construction Bank (Asia)
