= Wong Ker-lee =

The Honourable Wong Ker-lee GBM
- 黄克立

Mayor of Taichung
- In office 21 January 1946 – 7 April 1947
- Chief Executive: Chen Yi
- Preceded by: Liu Chun-chung
- Succeeded by: Mo Ta-yuan (acting); Lee Hui

Personal details
- Born: 15 August 1910 Quanzhou, Fujian, Qing Empire
- Died: 1 May 2004 (aged 93) Hong Kong, China
- Spouse: Wong Lin Chin-hwa
- Children: Philip Wong
- Education: Xiamen University

Wong Ker-lee, GBM (simplified Chinese: 黄克立; traditional Chinese: 黃克立; Jyutping: Wong4 Hak1 Laap6; Pe̍h-ōe-jī: N̂g Khek-li̍p; 15 August 1910 – 1 May 2004) was a Fujianese Hong Kong businessman and politician. He was first Mayor of Taichung after the Chinese retrocession of Taiwan from 1946 to 1947 when he resigned for the February 28 Incident. After he moved to Hong Kong, he founded several banks including the Overseas Trust Bank and the Hong Kong Industrial and Commercial Bank. From the 1980s, he was the member of the National Committee of the 6th, 7th, 8th and 9th Chinese People's Political Consultative Conference (CPPCC) and member of its standing committee from 1988 to 2003.

== Early life, Fujian and Taiwan career ==
Wong was born in 1910 in Quanzhou, Fujian. He was graduated from the Jimei Middle School and Xiamen University in 1935 in Economics and was an accountant for the two schools. He was the revenue commissioner of Tong'an District, Xiamen and Quanzhou during the Second Sino-Japanese War and served as a financial adviser of the Fujian Provincial Government.

After the victory, he was sent to Taiwan to represent the Nationalist government to receive the surrender of Japan. Between 1946 and 1947, he was the deputy director of the finance department of the Taiwan Provincial Government and first Mayor of Taichung. During his mayorship, he co-founded the Chang Hwa Bank with Lin Hsien-tang where he was the deputy chairman of the bank. At the time February 28 Incident broke out, where he was surrounded by a crowd with Yen Chia-kan, the then director of the finance department of Taiwan Provisional Government while the city's military arsenal was looted by Hsieh Hsueh-hung-led crowd of the Taiwanese Communist Party. Wong had to dress like a beggar in order to escape. He reassumed to the administration resumed the public order with the help of Lin Hsien-tang. On 4 April 1947, his resignation from the mayorship was approved by Taiwan Chief Executive Chen Yi.

== Hong Kong career ==
Wong arrived in Hong Kong in 1947, he stayed and worked at the Chiyu Banking Corporation on the recommendation of the bank's founder Tan Kah Kee as an assistant manager. In 1955, Wong founded the Overseas Trust Bank and subsequently the Hong Kong Industrial and Commercial Bank, until the two banks were taken over by the Hong Kong government in 1985. In the 1960s, he set up the Winco Paper Products and Tai Cheng Securities Ltd. and became the chairman of the two companies. He was also a director of the Tung Wah Group of Hospitals from 1969 to 1970.

He was first appointed to the Fujian Committee of the Chinese People's Political Consultative Conference in 1979. He was then appointed member of the National Committee of the 6th Chinese People's Political Consultative Conference (CPPCC) in 1983 and became a member of standing committee for the 7th, 8th and 9th CPPCC from 1988 to 2003. He was also a member of the Selection Committee, which was responsible for electing the first Chief Executive and Provisional Legislative Council. In 1997, he was among the first recipients of the Grand Bauhinia Medal, the highest honour of the Hong Kong Special Administrative Region.

== Death ==
Wong died in Hong Kong on 1 May 2004, aged 95. He was the second Hongkonger to have his casket draped in the Chinese national flag since the handover after T. K. Ann. He was survived by his wife Wong Lin Chin-hwa and children Philip Wong Yu-hong, who is also a businessman and politician, Patrick Wong Yu-pei and Kay Wong Yu-chen.

Government offices
Preceded by Liu Chun-chung	Mayor of Taichung; 1946–1947	Succeeded by Lee Hui
