= George Kwok Bew =

Chinese Australian merchant, political activist (1868–1932)

George Bew
- 郭標
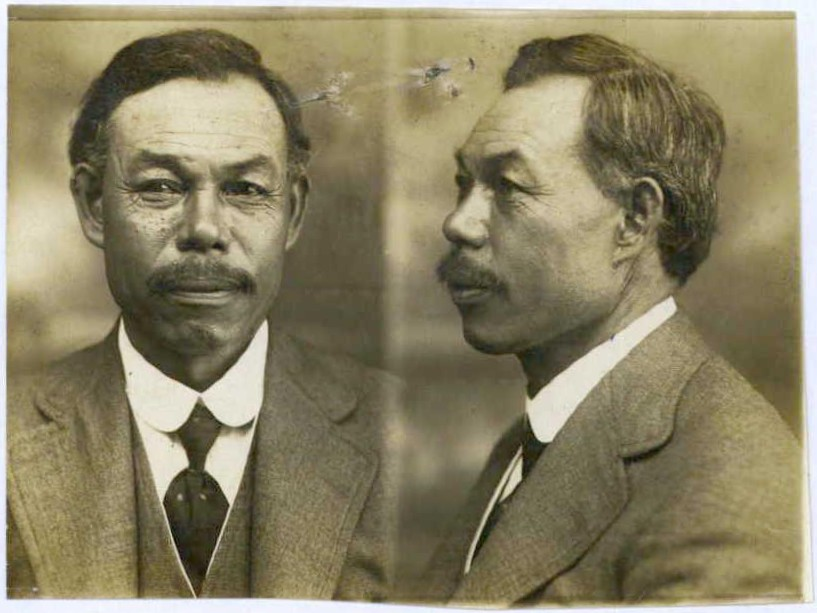
- Born: George Kwok Bew c. January 1868; Heung Shan (Chung Shan), Qing Empire (now Zhongshan, Guangdong, China)
- Died: 3 January 1932 (aged 63–64); Shanghai, Republic of China
- Other names: Kwok Bew; Guo Biao
- Occupations: Merchant; Chinese community leader political activist
- Spouse(s): Darling Young (1896–1932), his death
- Children: 11 (5 sons, 6 daughters)

George Kwok Bew, also known as Guo Biao, George Bew and Kwok Bew, (c. January 1868 – 3 January 1932) was a Chinese Australian merchant, Chinese community leader and political activist.

== Early life ==
George Kwok Bew was born circa January 1868 in Heung Shan (later Chung Shan, now Zhongshan), in Guangdong province, China. His father was Chap Hing, a local farmer and his mother was Fung Size, a homemaker. Kwok left for Australia in 1883, after his father died.

== Career ==
=== In Sydney ===
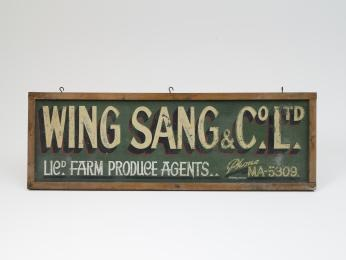
Advertising sign for Wing San and Co., circa 1935

Kwok cofounded and partially owned Sydney's first fruits and vegetables wholesale store, Wing Sang and Co. (Chinese: 永生果阑, also referred to as "Wing San"). and was also a partner of Australian banana importer Sang on Tiy (生安泰), a merger company formed by Wing Sang and two other fruit companies Wing On and Tiy Sang. Around 1899, he was already at full swing, handling around six thousand banana bunches from North Queensland every week. Kwok was regarded as one of the most prominent fruit merchants then in Sydney and expanded his business interests into other areas, such as shipping. Recognised as a leader amongst Chinese merchants, especially the community of merchants from Heung Shan, Kwok heavily petitioned against the Immigration Restriction Act 1901 and was strongly against racism.

Kwok became an associate of Chinese reformist politician-in-exile Liang Qichao and initially leaned towards the reformist goal of establishing a constitutional monarchy in China. He was a founder of the Australian chapter of the Chinese Empire Reform Association in 1901. However, he switched his support to the republican revolutionary Sun Yat-sen, who also hailed from Heung Shan. In support of the republican cause, Kwok established a republican newspaper in Sydney in 1914, which circulated in Australia and across the Pacific and South East Asia. Kwok became the founding president of the Chinese Nationalist League of Sydney (Kuomintang) in 1916.

Kwok's cousin James Gock Lock (Kwok Lok) had initially worked for Kwok Bew in Sydney at Wing Sang, and later with George, and James' brothers Philip Gock Chin (Kwok Chuen) and William Gock Son (Kwok Sun), opened their own fruit and vegetable business named Wing On & Co., also in Sydney's Chinatown. After Wing On merged with Wing Sang and Tiy Sang to form Sang On Tiy, James was put in charge of procuring land for banana plantations on behalf of Sang On Tiy in Fiji, securing a direct supply of imported bananas for Wing On Tiy.

=== In Shanghai ===
In 1917, Kwok and his family relocated to Shanghai, China, following an invitation from revolutionary Chinese leader Sun Yat Sen.

James, Philip and William left Australia in 1907 to found the Wing On Company, a department store modelled after Anthony Hordern & Sons, in Hong Kong. In 1918, George partnered with the three cousins to open a Wing On store in Shanghai, which became one of the "four great companies" that introduced the modern department store format to Shanghai. Two of George's partners at Wing Sang followed the same route, and founded Sincere and The Sun, two of the other "four great companies". George Kwok became the managing director of Wing On and steered its growth towards a conglomerate involved in retail, banking and manufacturing.

In 1928, the Kuomintang government took Shanghai in the Northern Expedition and the Shanghai Mint became the Central Mint of the Republic of China. George Kwok was appointed head of the Central Mint, and served an important role in the management of China's economy alongside finance minister T. V. Soong.

== Personal life ==
In 1896, Kwok wed Darling Young, a fellow merchant's daughter. They had eight children, four sons and four daughters; one of these daughters was Daisy Kwok. He had another son and two daughters with his second wife. Before moving to Shanghai, Kwok's children could not understand the Chinese language. In 1996, the Kwok family made "the biggest single foreign property investment" of that year when they purchased 333 Collins Street in Melbourne.

== Death ==
He died in Shanghai, China, on 3 January 1932, survived by his wife and his eight children.
