= King King =

King King may refer to:

- King King (band), a British blues rock group
- King King (album), a 1992 album by The Red Devils
- Sieh King King (1883–1960), Chinese-American feminist activist
- James King King (1806–1881), British politician
- Tong King King (born 1965), Hong Kong fencer
