= David Shou-Yeh Wong =

Hong Kong billionaire banker and philanthropist

- 王守業
- Born: Ningbo, Zhejiang, China
- Occupations: Founder & Chairman; Dah Sing Bank; Dah Sing Life Assurance
- Spouse: Christine Yen Wong
- Children: 3

Chinese name
- Traditional Chinese: 王守業
- Simplified Chinese: 王守业
- Hanyu Pinyin: Wáng Shǒuyè
- Yale Romanization: Wòhng Sáuyihp
- Jyutping: Wong4 Sau2jip6

David Shou-Yeh Wong (Chinese: 王守業; born c. 1941) is a Hong Kong billionaire banker and philanthropist.

== Biography ==
A native of Ningbo, Zhejiang, China, Wong is the founder and President of the Dah Sing Bank Limited. He also invests in mainland China, including the Chongqing Business Bank.

He is chairman of Dah Sing Life Assurance Company Ltd. as well as vice-president of the Hong Kong Institute of Bankers.

In 2008's Forbes Hong Kong's 40 Richest list, Wong was ranked as one of Hong Kong's top 40 billionaires (No.37).

He is married to Christine Yen Wong, daughter of Hong Kong industrialist Joseph Yen and second wife Jeanne Virginie Prosperi.
