= Wing On Bank =

Hong Kong bank

- Traditional Chinese: 永安銀行
- Simplified Chinese: 永安银行
Transcriptions
Standard Mandarin
- Hanyu Pinyin: Yǒng'ān Yínháng
Yue: Cantonese
- Jyutping: wing5 on1 ngan4 hong4

The Wing On Bank Limited (Chinese:香港永安銀行有限公司) was a bank in Hong Kong. It was majority owned by Wing On Holdings, a listed vehicle 68.8% controlled by the Kwok family, including Kwok Lam-po.

== History ==
The bank was founded by the Kwok family, led by Kwok Lok (郭樂) (aka Guo Luo) and Kwok Chuen (郭泉) (aka Guo Chuan) in 1931, growing out of an insurance operation on the back of the successful Wing On department store.

=== The Wing On Bank Limited era ===
==== Collapse ====
The bank collapsed in 1986 when its auditors had qualified the 1985 accounts on fundamental uncertainty, and its shareholders voted against a special resolution on capital injection of HK$154 million.

The Hang Seng Bank stepped in and bailed out the lender with a cash injection of HK$150 million in December 1985.

Hang Seng assumed management control of the failed bank in June 1986, injected a total of HK$330 million, and rapidly returned it to profit. A number of unprofitable branches were closed down. The injection was transformed into a 50.3% stake.

The Legislative Council approved an appropriation of HK$10 million to investigate possible criminal acts that might have caused the collapse of this and two other institutions. The Commercial Crime Bureau was brought in, and investigators established the bank had collapsed on doubtful loans of $275 million relating to the personal affairs of Albert Kwok the general manager, who died in April 1986.

In 1993, Hang Seng sold its majority stake in Wing On Bank to Dah Sing Bank.

=== D.A.H. Private Bank Ltd era ===
In 1997, Dah Sing Bank re-organised Wing On into a private bank, and the bank was named "D.A.H. Private Bank Ltd" (安新私人銀行有限公司), owned by Dah Sing, Abbey National and SG Hambros. In 2000, Dah Sing bought out the remainder of D.A.H. Private Bank Ltd, absorbed most of its private bank business into Dah Sing Bank itself, while the remaining business was renamed in 2001 as MEVAS Bank.

== See also ==
- Wing On
- Wing On House
