= MEVAS Bank =

Hong Kong bank

- MEVAS Bank logo
- Native name: 豐明銀行
- Founded: April 2001
- Defunct: 2012
- Headquarters: Hong Kong
- Parent: Dah Sing Financial Holdings Limited

Chinese name
- Traditional Chinese: 豐明銀行
- Simplified Chinese: 丰明银行
Transcriptions
Standard Mandarin
- Hanyu Pinyin: Fēng Míng Yín Xíng
Yue: Cantonese
- Jyutping: Fung^{1} Ming^{4} Ngan^{4} Hang^{4}
- Website: http://www.mevas.com/

MEVAS Bank (simplified Chinese: 丰明银行; traditional Chinese: 豐明銀行) was a bank based in Hong Kong. It was established in April 2001 with a total investment of ¥300 million (US$46,511,627.91). Within the first two weeks of its opening, over a thousand people signed up for their banking services. The bank marketed itself as being Hong Kong's first virtual bank and publicised that customers could use it to do 24-hour online banking. MEVAS Bank's targeted clientele was young professionals.

In 2002, after Hong Kong's legalisation of football gambling, MEVAS Bank partnered with the English football club Arsenal F.C. to create a credit card, Arsenal's first credit card not issue in the UK. Between June 2002 and January 2003, the company had a loss of ¥$16.6 million (US$2,573,643.41) at the beginning of 2003 had 80 employees. In May 2003, the bank increased its fee for bank accounts with low balances, which affected 20% of its customer base, or 20,000 people in total. According to Chen Zhiming, a CLSA analyst, although MEVAS Bank's low balance account fee would have little effects on its revenue, it would reduce the number of customers who had low balances and were making MEVAS lose money. In 2003, MEVAS Bank issued its first pet store credit card, and by May of that year, the bank's customers had signed up for over 80,000 of its different types of credit cards. In November 2003, the bank launched the PreciousMoments credit card, which had minimum income requirement of HKD$60,000 (US$7,722.01). In 2005, MEVAS Bank had at 0.75% the highest deposit interest rate among small- and medium-sized banks.

It was a wholly owned subsidiary of Dah Sing Financial Holdings Limited. It was known as D.A.H. Private Bank Limited (Chinese: 安新私人銀行有限公司) EX-Wing On Bank until 2 March 2001 when it was renamed "MEVAS Bank". In September 2010, Dah Sing Bank acquired the minority interests in D.A.H. Private Bank Limited (DAHP). It then transferred the private banking business, including loans and deposits, of DAHP to Dah Sing Bank. MEVAS Bank had five branches located in Central, Queen's Road Central, Wan Chai, Mong Kok, and Tuen Mun. Four of those branches were renamed to the Dah Sing brand, while the Central branch kept its branding. It had over 100,000 customers in 2010.

MEVAS Bank was no longer in business from 2012 and removed as licensed bank in Hong Kong Monetary Authority register but was bought by Dah Sing Financial Holdings Limited on January 13, 2013.
