= Dah Sing Bank =

Hong Kong-based bank

Dah Sing Bank Limited
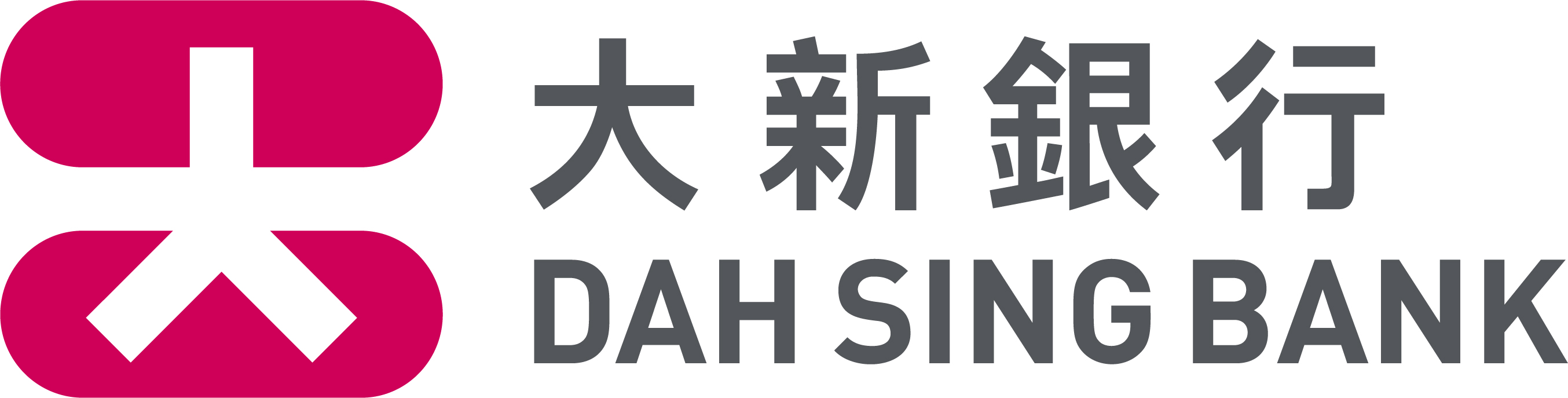
- Type: Public
- Traded as: SEHK: 2356; (as Dah Sing Banking Group Limited)
- Industry: Finance
- Founded: 1 May 1947; 79 years ago
- Headquarters: Dah Sing Financial Centre, 248 Queen's Road East, Wan Chai, Hong Kong
- Key people: David Shou-Yeh Wong, Chairman; Derek Hon-Hing Wong, CEO
- Operating income: ▼HKD5.4 billion (2019)
- Net income: ▼HKD2.2 billion (2019)
- Total assets: ▲HKD243 billion (2019)
- Website: dahsing.com

Dah Sing Bank
- Traditional Chinese: 大新銀行
Transcriptions
Yue: Cantonese
- Yale Romanization: Daaih sān ngàhn hòhng
- Jyutping: Daai6 san1 ngan4 hong4

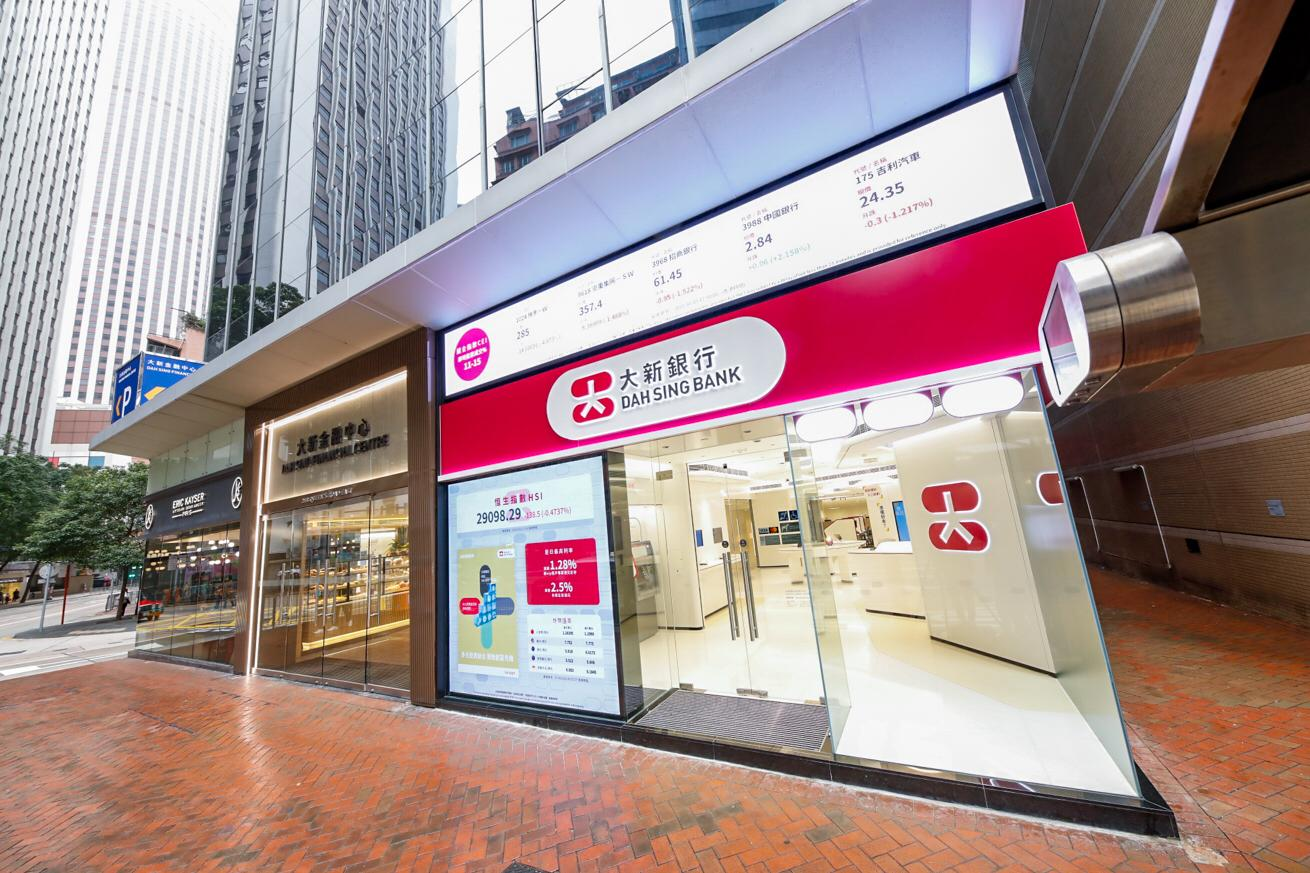
Dah Sing Bank's branch in Queens' Road East

Dah Sing Banking Group Limited (DSBG) is a Hong Kong–based banking and financial company, headquartered in Wan Chai. It has been listed on the Hong Kong Stock Exchange since 2004. It has three main banking subsidiaries (Dah Sing Bank, Banco Comercial de Macau and Dah Sing Bank (China) Limited) providing relevant services through a branch network of around 70 branches over Hong Kong, Macau and mainland China, and a securities trading company.

The group was established on 1 May 1947. David Shou-Yeh Wong was appointed as the chairman whilst Harold Tsu-Hing Wong (王祖興), the son of David Wong, joined as the group managing director and chief executive of DSBG.

== History ==
1947: Establishment of Dah Sing Bank, Limited (DSB).

1987: DSB acquired Hong Kong Industrial and Commercial Bank Limited; Public listing of Dah Sing Financial Holdings Limited(DSFH)

1990: Establishment of Dah Sing Life Assurance Co. Limited.

1993: DSFH acquired Wing On Bank Limited.

1994: Dah Sing Bank transferred its 40% ownership at Hong Kong Industrial and Commercial Bank to China Construction Bank.

1997: DSFH, Abbey National plc and Hambros Bank Limited went into a contract to jointly run the Wing On Bank Limited as a Hong Kong–based private bank and renamed it as DAHP.

1998: Dah Sing Bank sold an additional 30% shareholding interest at Jian Sing Bank (formerly known as Hong Kong Industrial and Commercial Bank) to China Construction Bank.

2000: DSFH acquired ownerships of DAHP from Abbey and SG Hambros (formerly known as Hambros Bank Limited). DAHP became a subsidiary of DSFH while the private banking business, loans and deposits from DAHP were undertaken by Dah Sing Bank.

2002: China Construction Bank purchased the remaining equity interest of Jian Sing Bank from Dah Sing Bank.

2004: Separate listing of Dah Sing Banking Group Limited.

2005: DSBG completed the acquisition of 100% of Pacific Finance (HK) Limited, 100% of BCM Bank (Banco Comercial de Macau) and 96% equity interests in BCM's general and life insurance subsidiaries from Banco Comercial Portugues.

2007: DSB completed the acquisition of a 17% total equity interest in the Bank of Chongqing (BOCQ).

2010: DSB integrated with MEVAS Bank (formerly known as DAHP).

2011: Establishment of OK Finance Limited.

2017: DSFH sold its entire shareholding interest in life insurance business in Hong Kong and Macau to Tahoe Investment Group Co. Limited.

2019: First bank in Hong Kong to offer full virtual loan application – no need for income proof and address proof

2021: Opened Queen's Road East Branch

== Parent companies and leadership ==
=== Dah Sing Financial Holdings ===
Dah Sing Financial Group was founded on 22 April 1987, and is the ultimate parent company, which owns a majority share of Dah Sing Financial Holdings, which in turn owns a majority share of Dah Sing Banking Group and other non-banking financial assets.

==== List of chief executives ====
1. Ronald Carstairs (1991–2001)
2. Derek Wong Hon-hing (since 2002)

==== List of chairmen ====
1. David Wong Shou-yeh (since 1987)

=== Dah Sing Banking Group ===
Dah Sing Banking Group was founded on 11 March 2004, and has three banking entities under it: Dah Sing Bank, Banco Comercial de Macau and Dah Sing Bank (China) Limited.

- Chairman: David Wong Shou-yeh (since 2004)
- Chief Executive: Derek Wong Hon-hing (since 2017); second term

==== List of chief executives ====
1. Derek Wong Hon-hing (2004–2011)
2. Harold Wong Tsu-hing (2011–2017)
3. Derek Wong Hon-hing (since 2017); second term

==== List of chairmen ====
1. David Wong Shou-yeh (since 2004)

== Dah Sing Bank senior leadership ==
Dah Sing Bank was founded on 1 May 1947.

=== List of chairmen ===
1. Yang Yuan-loong (1947–1957)
2. Wong Shih-sing (1957–1983)
3. David Wong Shou-yeh (since 1983)

=== List of chief executives ===
1. Edward Cheung Ting-yat (1974–1986)
2. John William Simpson (1986–1991)
3. Ronald Carstairs (1991–2000)
4. Derek Wong Hon-hing (2000–2011)
5. Harold Wong Tsu-hing (since 2011)

== See also ==
- List of banks in Hong Kong
