= Wing On =

Hong Kong department store company

Wing On Department Stores (Hong Kong) Limited 永安百貨有限公司
- Industry: retailing ( cosmetics, fashion, home appliances, luxury stationery, ivory craft, kitchen wares and appliances, etc)
- Founded: 1907
- Founder: Kwok Lok (郭樂) and Kwok Chuen (郭泉)
- Headquarters: Hong Kong
- Area served: Hong Kong
- Key people: Kwok Lok, Kwok Chuen
- Owner: Karl Kwok Chi Leung
- Parent: Wing On Company International Limited (Wing on Company)
- Divisions: Wing on Bank
- Website: https://shop.wingon.hk/

Wing On Department Stores (Hong Kong) Limited
- Traditional Chinese: 永安百貨有限公司
Transcriptions

Wing On Department Store
- Traditional Chinese: 永安百貨
- Simplified Chinese: 永安百货
Transcriptions
Standard Mandarin
- Hanyu Pinyin: Yǒng'ān Bǎihuò
Yue: Cantonese
- Jyutping: wing5 on1 baak3 fo3

Wing On Department Stores (Hong Kong) Limited (Chinese: 永安百貨有限公司), often shortened to Wing On or Wing On Department Stores, is a department store company in Hong Kong, a subsidiary of Wing On Company International Limited.

The head office is in Wing On Centre (永安中心) in Sheung Wan.

Until it was nationalised in 1966, Wing On's Shanghai branch was one of the "four great companies" of Shanghai.

== History ==
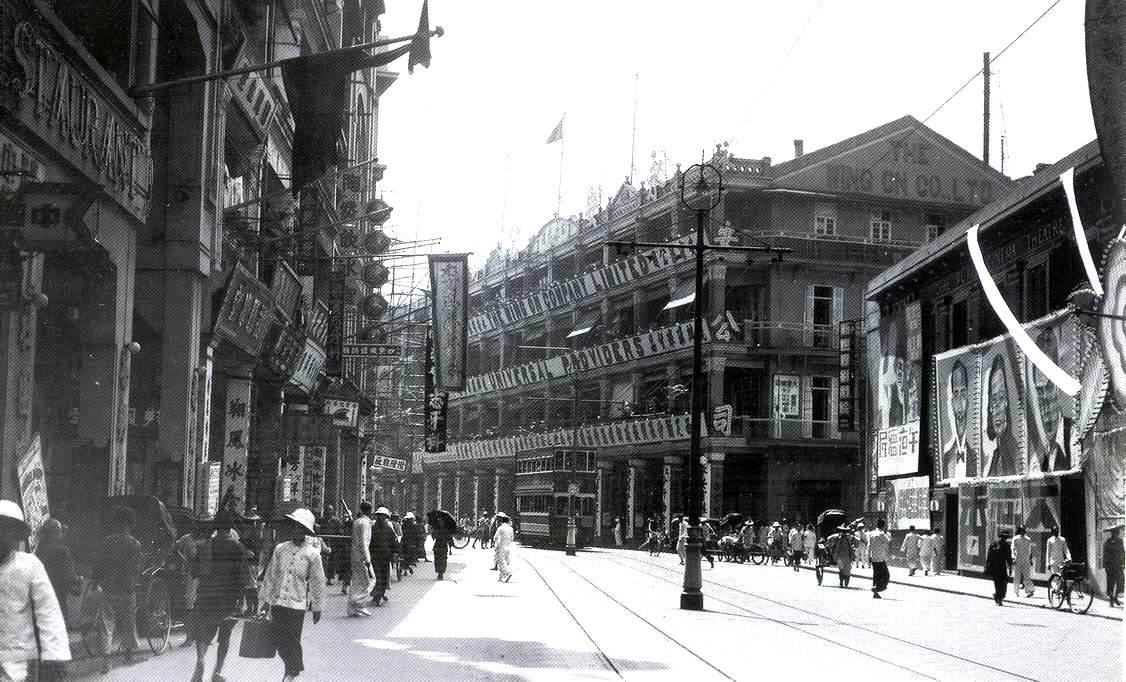
The World Cinema (right) and Wing on Company (centre) on 179, Des Voeux Road, Central, c1920s–30s

Brothers James Gock Lock (Kwok Lok) (郭樂) and Philip Gock Chin (Kwok Chuen) (郭泉) started the Wing On fruit store in Australia in 1897. Wing On imported nuts, tea, rice, fireworks and ginger from China. The original "Wing On Building", located at 37 Ultimo Road in Haymarket, New South Wales, in Sydney's Chinatown, is now a hotel.

In 1907, James, Philip and their other brother William Gock Son (Kwok Sun) returned to Hong Kong with accumulated savings and founded the Wing on Company, the second Chinese-owned department store in Hong Kong. They expanded to Shanghai in 1918.

The Kwok brothers later went on to found Wing On Bank.

== Stores in Hong Kong ==
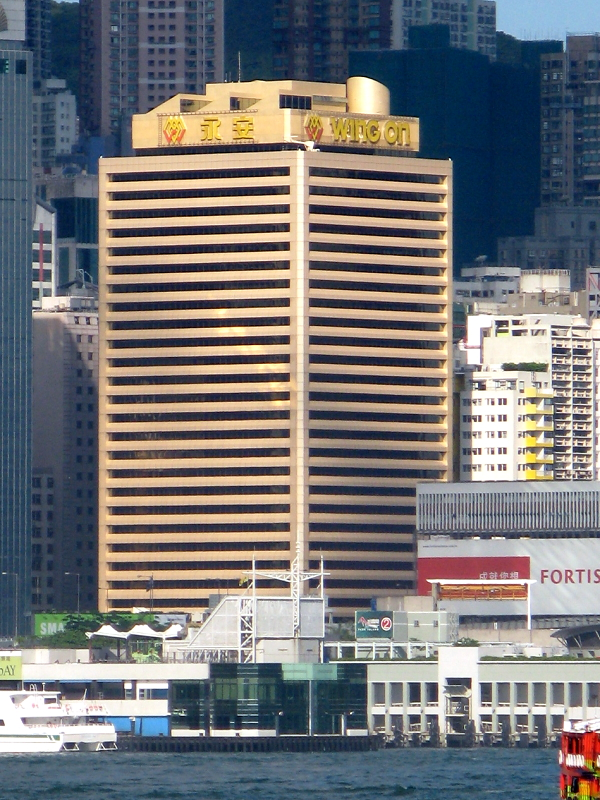
Wing On Centre houses the head office and a store

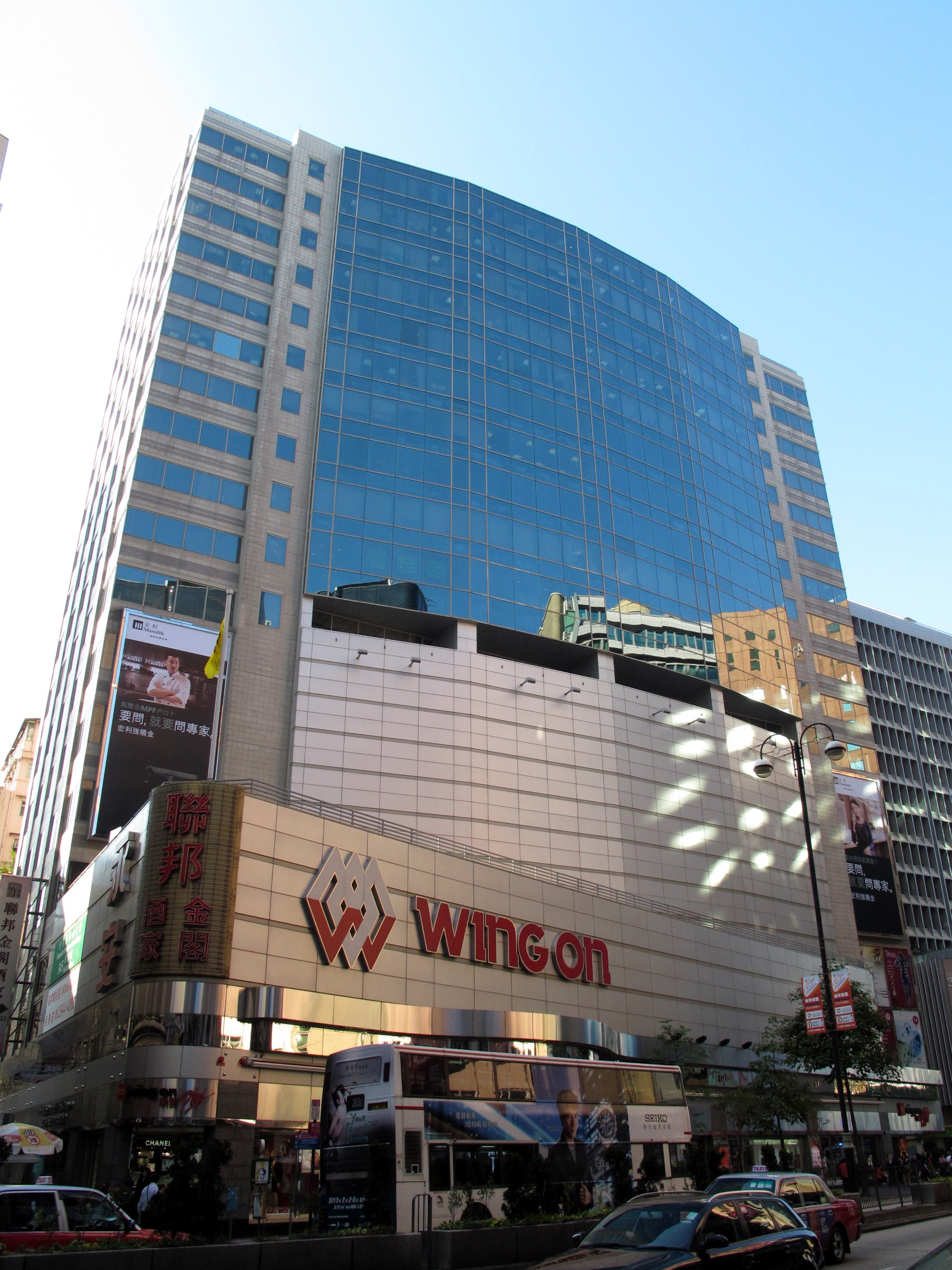
Wing on Manulife Provident Funds Place in 2013

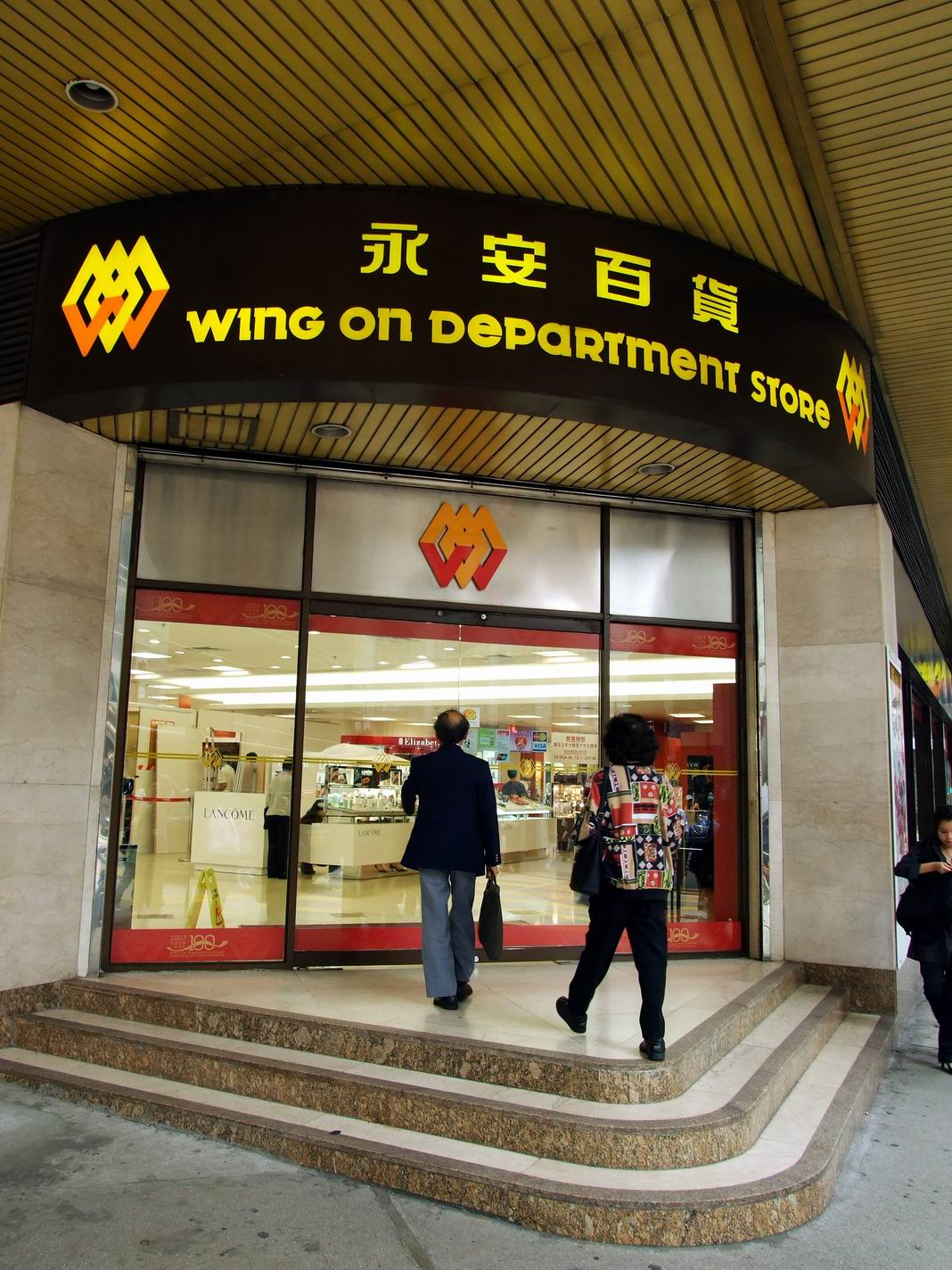
Wing On department store in 2007, Sheung Wan, Hong Kong Island

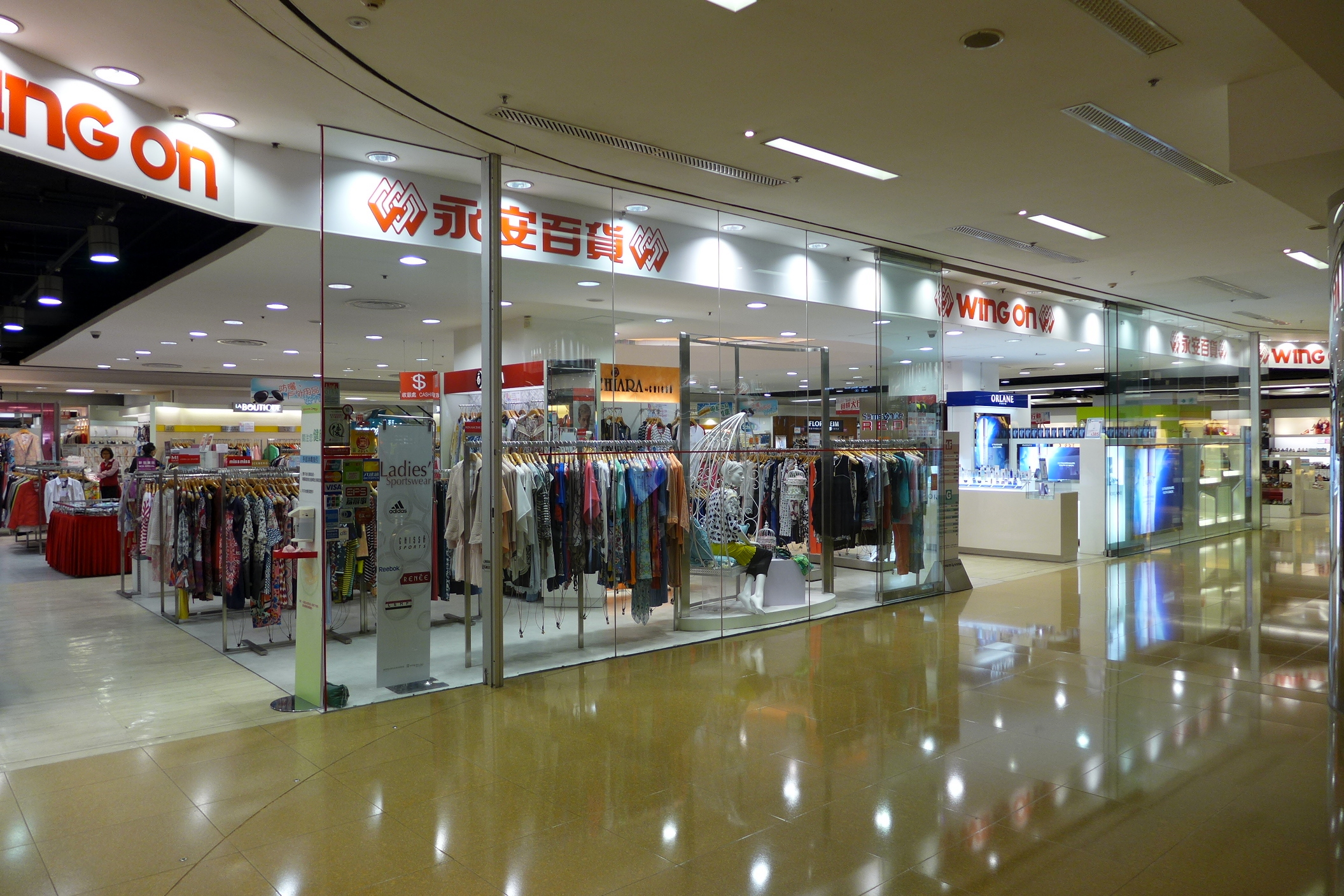
Wing On department store in Cityplaza, closed in August 2015

It has four outlets in Hong Kong, after the closure of Taikoo Shing Store in 2015, with 310,000 square meters (3,300,000 sq ft) of shopping space:

- Main Store: Wing On Centre, 211 Des Voeux Road Central, Sheung Wan
- Wing on Plus (Nathan Road): Wing on Manulife Provident Funds Place, 345 Nathan Road, Jordan-Yau Ma Tei
- Wing on Plus (Tsim Sha Tsui East): Wing on Plaza, 62 Mody Road, Tsim Sha Tsui East
- Discovery Bay Store: Shop 114, Block C, Discovery Bay Plaza, Discovery Bay, Lantau Island

The branch at the Wing On Centre was prominently featured in the climactic sequence to the 1985 Jackie Chan film Police Story.

=== Former branch ===
- Taikoo Shing Store: Cityplaza, Units 074 and 144, 18 Taikoo Shing Road, Taikoo Shing. In 2015-02-26, Wing On Company International Limited announced the branch's closure at August 2015 before the end of lease period. (It closed after 2 August 2015, Eslite Store will take over its original location.)

== Wing On in Shanghai ==
Wing On also had a branch in Shanghai, opened in 1918 on Nanking (Nanjing) Road by the Kwok brothers with their cousin, George Kwok Bew, who had recently moved to Shanghai from Sydney. The Kwok brothers had initially worked for George's fruit and vegetable business, Wing Sang & Co., in Sydney before starting their own fruit and vegetable business.

Wing On was the second of the "Four Great Companies", which were large department stores modelled on Australian precedent established by Cantonese migrants returning from Australia. The Four Great Companies brought the model of modern department stores with egalitarian service pioneered by Anthony Hordern & Sons to Shanghai and quickly became the focal points of Shanghai's commercial district. Three of the "Four Great Companies" - Wing On, Sincere and The Sun, were founded by former partners of Wing Sang & Co.

The store occupied two prominent buildings. The distinctive original building stood opposite from the (then) Sincere Department Store. An extension was built next to it in the 1930s, one of the first modern "skyscrapers" of Shanghai. After the Communist revolution in China, the store was partly nationalised in 1956, then fully nationalised in 1966 and renamed "East is Red Department Store", after which it was no longer connected to Wing On in Hong Kong and traded under various names. The 1930s extension building housed a separate "Overseas Chinese Store", which, for many years, was one of the few places in Shanghai where people with overseas connections could spend their foreign exchange certificates to buy goods not available to ordinary Chinese consumers.

In 2005, the department store in the original 1918 building resumed the Chinese version of the Wing On name (Chinese: 永安; pinyin: Yǒng'ān). However, the store is owned by a separate company from Wing On, called "Yongan Department Store Co Ltd", a state-owned company. This company does not use the "Wing On" name in its English translations. The exterior of the original store was restored to its appearance during the Wing On period. However, the interior has been drastically refurbished. The store has also changed its market orientation, focusing almost exclusively on domestic Chinese branded clothing targeted at visitors from other parts of China, with a small department in watches and other accessories.

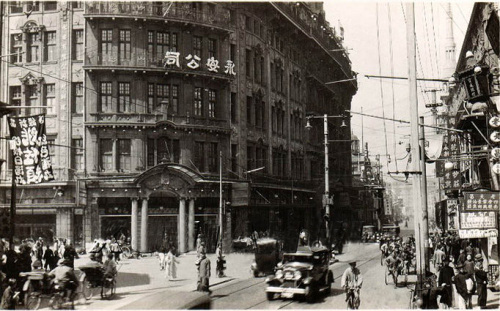
Wing On's Shanghai branch in the 1940s, on Nanking Road.

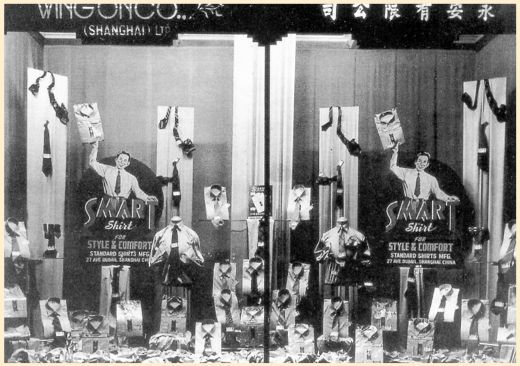
Shop window of Wing On's Shanghai branch in the 1940s.

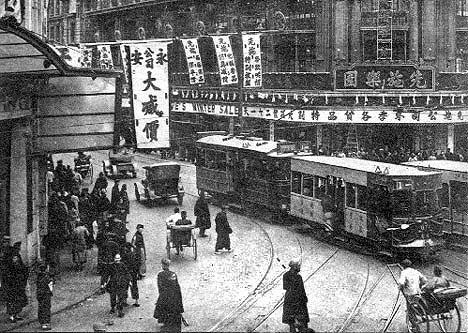
In this 1930s postcard, Wing On (left) is advertising its "Great Sale" on banners stretched across Nanking Road (to Sincere Department Store (right)).

== Wing On Company International Limited ==
Wing On Company International Limited
- Traditional Chinese: 永安國際有限公司
- Simplified Chinese: 永安国际有限公司
Transcriptions
Standard Mandarin
- Hanyu Pinyin: Yǒng'ān Guójì Yǒuxiàngōngsī
Yue: Cantonese
- Jyutping: wing5 on1 gwok3 zai3 jau5 haan6 gung1 si1

Established in December 1991, Wing On Company International Limited (SEHK: 289) is a parent company of Wing On Department Stores (Hong Kong) Limited, registered in Bermuda as a limited liability company.

Major shareholders include Kee Wai Investment Company (BVI) Limited, Wing On Corporate Management (BVI) Limited, Wing On International Holdings Limited.

The holding company of the listed company itself is Wing On International Holdings Limited, which is owned by Karl Kwok Chi Leung (郭志樑) and the Kwok family.

=== History ===
In 2014-03-14, Wing On Company International Limited announced relocating Hong Kong Branch Share Registrar and Transfer Office to Level 22 of Hopewell Centre.

=== Subsidiaries ===
Sources:

- Kee Wai Investment Company (BVI) Limited
  - Wing On Corporate Management (BVI) Limited
    - Wing On International Holdings Limited
      - Wing On Holdings (BVI) Limited
        - The Wing On (Holdings) Limited
          - The Wing On Properties and Securities Company Limited (WOPS) (永安地產證券有限公司): Formed in 1973-01-30.
            - Well Started Limited
            - Wocom Holdings Limited (宏高集團有限公司) (WOCOM): Acquired by Wing On Group in 1986.
              - Wocom Securities Limited (宏高證券有限公司)
              - Wocom Limited (宏高有限公司)
              - Wocom Foreign Exchange Co. Limited (宏高金融有限公司)
              - Wocom Investment Management Limited (宏高投貨管理有限公司)
- Wing On Department Stores (Hong Kong) Limited (WODS) (永安百貨有限公司): Wing On Company International Limited's fully owned subsidiary.
- Wing On Company Limited (WOCO) (永安有限公司): Wing On Company International Limited's fully owned subsidiary.

== See also ==
- Wing On Bank
- Wing On House
- Wing On Street
- Shanghainese people in Hong Kong
