= Sieh King King =

Chinese-American feminist activist

Sieh King King (simplified Chinese: 薛锦琴; traditional Chinese: 薛錦琴; pinyin: Xue Jinqin; 1883–1960), was an early 20th century Chinese-American feminist activist.

== Biography ==
Born in Zhongshan, Guangdong Province, China, her ideology was shaped by her liberal-minded father, as well as her education from missionary schools in Shanghai. In China, she became involved in the Chinese Empire Reform Association (or Baohuang Hui) and advocated for the liberation of China from foreign imperialism. In 1901, Sieh gave a speech in Shanghai that protested growing Russian influence in the Chinese government.

In 1902, she moved to San Francisco to attend the University of California, Berkeley. Although her primary intention was to obtain a Western education and to return to China in order to enact education reform, she became involved with the feminist movement at that time through the Ladies Chapter of the Chinese Empire Reform Association in San Francisco. At the age of eighteen, Sieh gave a speech in a theater in San Francisco's Chinatown to a crowd of both men and women, where she discussed the impact of female oppression, and in particular foot binding, the lack of access to education, and on the weakening of China's political influence and the growing effects of imperialism. She claimed that foot binding and the lack of education led to the "[breaking] of spirits" among Chinese women, which weakened families and Chinese society as a whole. After the speech, a banquet was held in Sieh's honor. Upon her request, women were invited to the banquet and were able to sit with the men for the first time.

After her 1902 speech, she gave another speech to an all-female crowd in 1903, where she elaborated on the idea of women's liberation. She became a well-known activist in the San Francisco area, drawing crowds to her speeches in the hundreds and, sometimes, in the thousands. In 1905, she moved to Los Angeles and stayed with a fellow Chinese Empire Reform Association member. Afterwards, she graduated from the University of Chicago and returned to China.
