= Hong Kong Industrial and Commercial Bank =

Hong Kong bank

Industrial and Commercial Bank (Chinese: 工商銀行) was a bank in Hong Kong, established in 1917. Under the leadership of its general manager, Xue Xianzhou (薛仙舟), after 1919, its business was focused on operating money remittances of Overseas Chinese and its branches were extended to Guangzhou, Hankou, Shanghai, and Tianjin. However, the bank was closed down in 1930 after Xue's death and losing in foreign currency business.

A new bank with a similar name, the Hong Kong Industrial and Commercial Bank (香港工商銀行), was re-established in 1964. In 1987, it was acquired by Dah Sing Bank. In 1994, its 40% interest was acquired by China Construction Bank and it was renamed to Jian Sing Bank (建新銀行). In 2002, Jian Sing Bank was totally acquired by China Construction Bank and renamed to China Construction Bank (Asia) Limited (中國建設銀行(亞洲)有限公司).

== See others ==
- China Construction Bank (Asia)
