= Chinese Empire Reform Association =

Former political party in QIng dynasty China

Chinese Empire Reform Association 保皇會, 憲政會
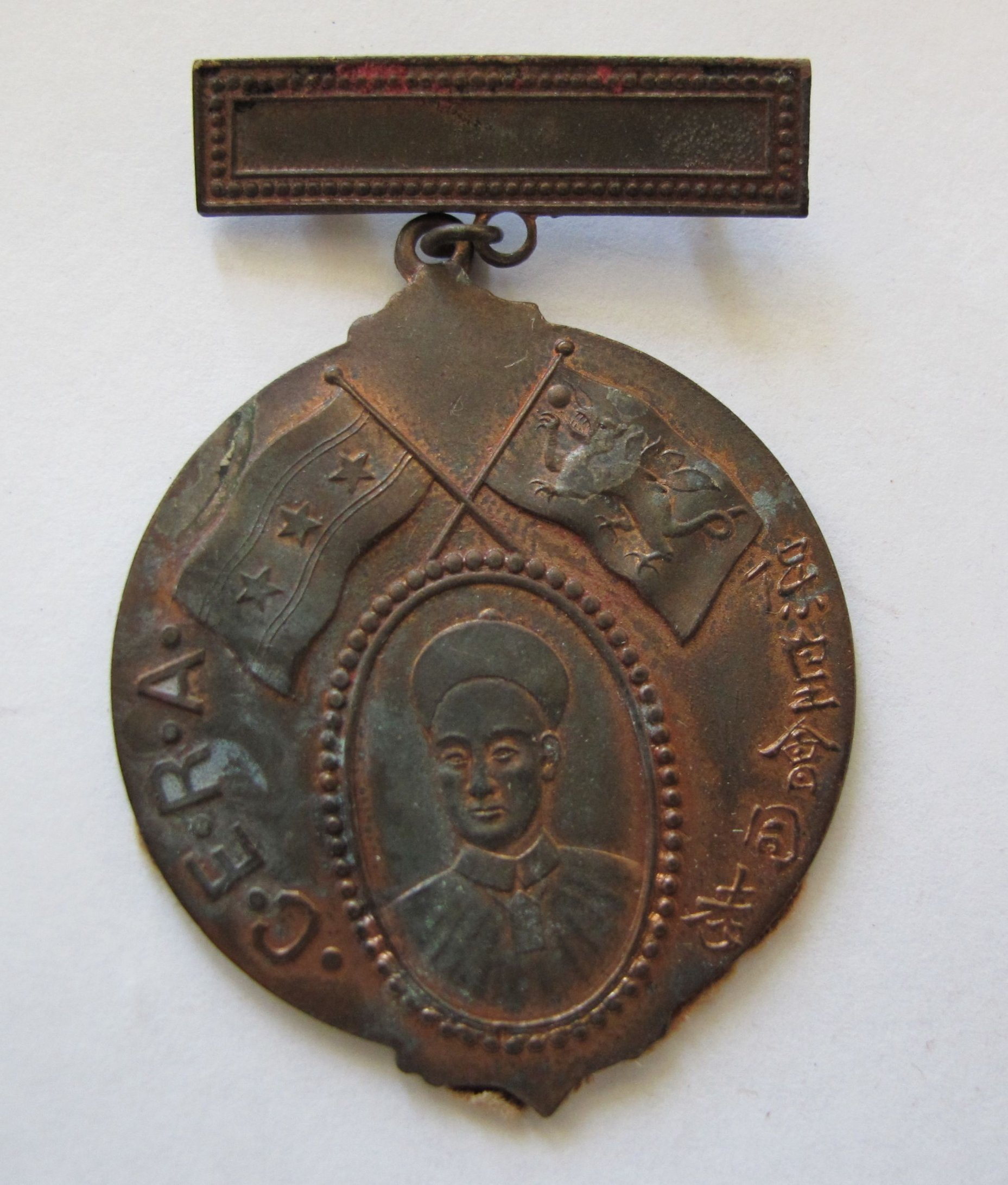
- Typical membership badge: Emperor Guangxu’s portrait flanked by inscriptions for CERA (Chinese Empire Reform Association) and "Baohuanghui Tongzhi" or "Baohuanghui comrade".
- Abbreviation: CERA
- Leader: Kang Youwei
- Founded: 20 July 1899
- Dissolved: c. 1911, although some chapters, newspapers, businesses, and schools were active much longer
- Succeeded by: Constitutional Party (Xianzhengdang)
- Headquarters: 1715 Government Street, Victoria, British Columbia, Canada
- Newspaper: Over 40 newspapers in the Americas, Asia, and Australia
- Women's wing: Chinese Empire Ladies Reform Association
- Membership: Several hundred thousands worldwide
- Ideology: Constitutionalism; Constitutional Monarchy; Chinese nationalism Reformism
- Regional affiliation: At least 230 chapters in Africa, the Americas, Asia, Australia, and Europe

Party flag

The Chinese Empire Reform Association, abbreviated as CERA, was known in Chinese as Baojiu Da-Qing Huangdi Hui, Chinese: 保救大清皇帝會; lit. 'Society to Protect the Qing Emperor'), or, more often, Baohuanghui, Chinese: 保皇會; lit. 'Protect the Emperor Society'. It was a worldwide Chinese political association founded by Kang Youwei (1858–1927) and others in Victoria, British Columbia on 20 July 1899. Its goal was to unite overseas Chinese to restore the Guangxu Emperor to his throne and transform China's autocratic empire into a constitutional monarchy.

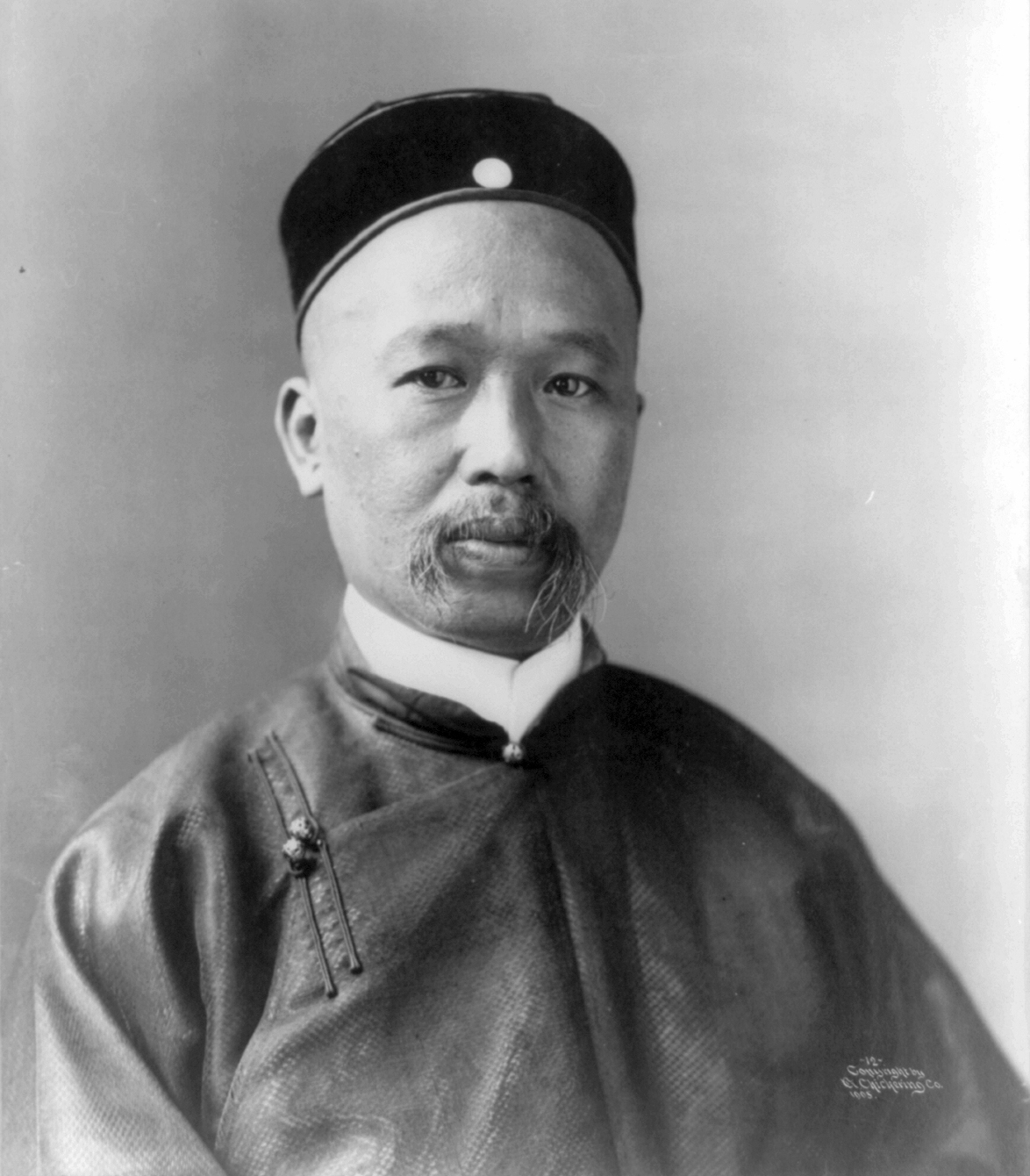
Kang Youwei ca 1905

Kang was a Cantonese scholar, teacher, and constitutional reformer who helped Guangxu enact extensive educational, political, social, military, economic, and administrative reforms during the tumultuous Hundred Days of Reform, June 11 to September 21, 1898.

The reform period only lasted 103 days because the reforms threatened the power and position of the conservative Qing court and Guangxu's aunt and former regent, Empress Dowager Cixi. Cixi took back the throne, put Guangxu under house arrest, and abolished the reform program. She executed six of the reform advisors, including Kang's brother, and called for Kang's arrest and execution.

Warned by the emperor of the impending crackdown, Kang fled into exile, and made it his mission to restore the emperor and his reform program. Kang turned to Chinese living in the Americas, Australia, Asia, Africa, and Europe to join this nationalist movement. The result was a worldwide organization that grew to at least 230 local chapters and 100,000 members. The Chinese Empire Reform Association appealed to overseas Chinese who hoped to see their homeland modernize and democratize. It remained a strong organization until the end of 1911, when the revolutionaries led by Sun Yatsen were able to topple the Qing dynasty and form a republic. In effect, the Chinese Empire Reform Association was the first mass Chinese political party.

North America—Canada, the United States, and Mexico—was where the Association fulfilled its greatest potential, with at least 160 chapters. These chapters managed the full gamut of associated endeavors that Kang believed were necessary to save China. They sponsored newspapers and schools to propagate reform ideology; military academies to train young Chinese to defend their country; women’s associations to promote gender equality; and businesses to raise funds for reform activities and expand Chinese commercial power in China and abroad. Between 1899 and 1907, Kang spent 29 months in North America, traveling widely both for his education and pleasure; organizing, fundraising, and making speeches to both Chinese and American audiences; and meeting North American leaders, including Canadian Prime Minister Wilfrid Laurier, U.S. President Theodore Roosevelt, and Mexican President José de la Cruz Porfirio Díaz Mori.

== Name changes and reorganization, 1899–1912 ==
Although the organization was always known in English as the Chinese Empire Reform Association, its Chinese name changed over time, along with its goals and governing documents.

=== Baohuanghui (Protect the Emperor Society), 1899–1906 ===
During the founding meetings in July 1899, the name Baohuanghui 保皇會 was chosen because the Guangxu emperor “had risked his life to save the people.” For Baohuanghui members, the imprisoned emperor symbolized the endangered quest for reform and modernization of China. Kang wrote the founding document in September 1899, and while he informally called the organization Baohuanghui, in the first charter the organization name was Baojiu Da-Qing Huangdi Gongsi 保救大清皇帝公司 (Company to Protect the Great Qing Emperor). This name reflected the dual mission of political and economic reform and encouraged commercial investment by the overseas Chinese merchants who dominated the Baohuanghui leadership, but in practice, the term gongsi 公司 (company) was soon replaced with hui 會 (association or society).

=== Xianzhenghui (Constitutional Association), 1907-1912 ===
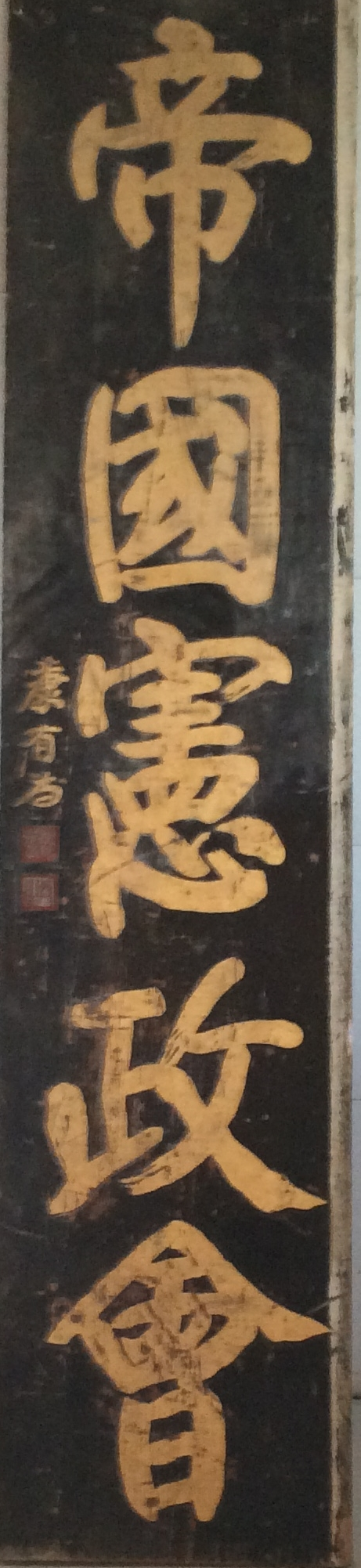
Diguo Xianzhenghui (Imperial Constitutional Association) signboard from chapter building at 7th and Front, Boise, Idaho; on left: Kang’s painted name and two carved seals, 康有為 (Kang Youwei’s seal) and 更生 (Gengsheng—Life Renewed).

On September 1, 1906, the Qing declared that China would begin the transition to a constitutional monarchy, after receiving positive reports from two imperial missions that studied constitutional systems in Japan, the United States and Europe. Kang decided the time was right for the Baohuanghui to change its name and its function from protecting the emperor (who appeared to be in no danger) to preparing its members to return to China to participate in a reformed government. In October 1906, he announced that on the lunar new year (February 13, 1907), the Baohuanghui would become the Guomin Xianzhenghui 國民憲政會 (Citizens’ Constitutional Association), or for short, Xianzhenghui 憲政會 (Constitutional Association). While the final name as adopted in 1907 hearkened back to the Baohuanghui connection, replacing Guomin 國民 (Citizen) with Diguo 帝國 (Imperial), the new charter stated that its goal was to expand the rights and duties of China’s citizens and to form a parliament. The organization was intended to teach members “how to structure a constitutional government, how to set up a political party, how citizens of a constitutional government and their country are interdependent, and how they rely on political parties.” In many ways, the Xianzhenghui charter resembled a national constitution.

Kang often used the term for "party" (dang 黨) rather than "association" (hui 會) and occasionally referred to the Xianzhenghui as Xianzhengdang (憲政黨 Constitutional Party).

== Organizational structure ==
The organizational structure of the Chinese Empire Reform Association was mandated in successive charters drafted by Kang Youwei, the first in 1899, and the second two discussed and amended at plenary meetings in New York City in 1905 and 1907. From top to bottom, the Association was governed by a president (Kang Youwei) who made all final decisions and vice president (Liang Qichao); one or more headquarters in Asia that collected and dispersed funds from chapters and Association businesses; local chapters; and members. The chapters were based in towns and cities. The United States was the country with the most chapters, which were grouped in divisions (Northwest, California, Montana, Central, East, South). Driving the expansion of the Association between 1899 and 1905 was an organizing push by Kang himself as well as a traveling cadre of former students who had attended his school in Guangzhou in the 1890s and local leaders who took the initiative to form new chapters and recruit members.

All officers, including the president, were to be elected by members or chapter delegates. However, Kang as president and Liang as vice-president held their offices continuously. Liang Qichao, like Kang, was an advisor to the Guangxu Emperor in 1898 and fled into exile and traveled widely on behalf of the Association, while living in Japan.

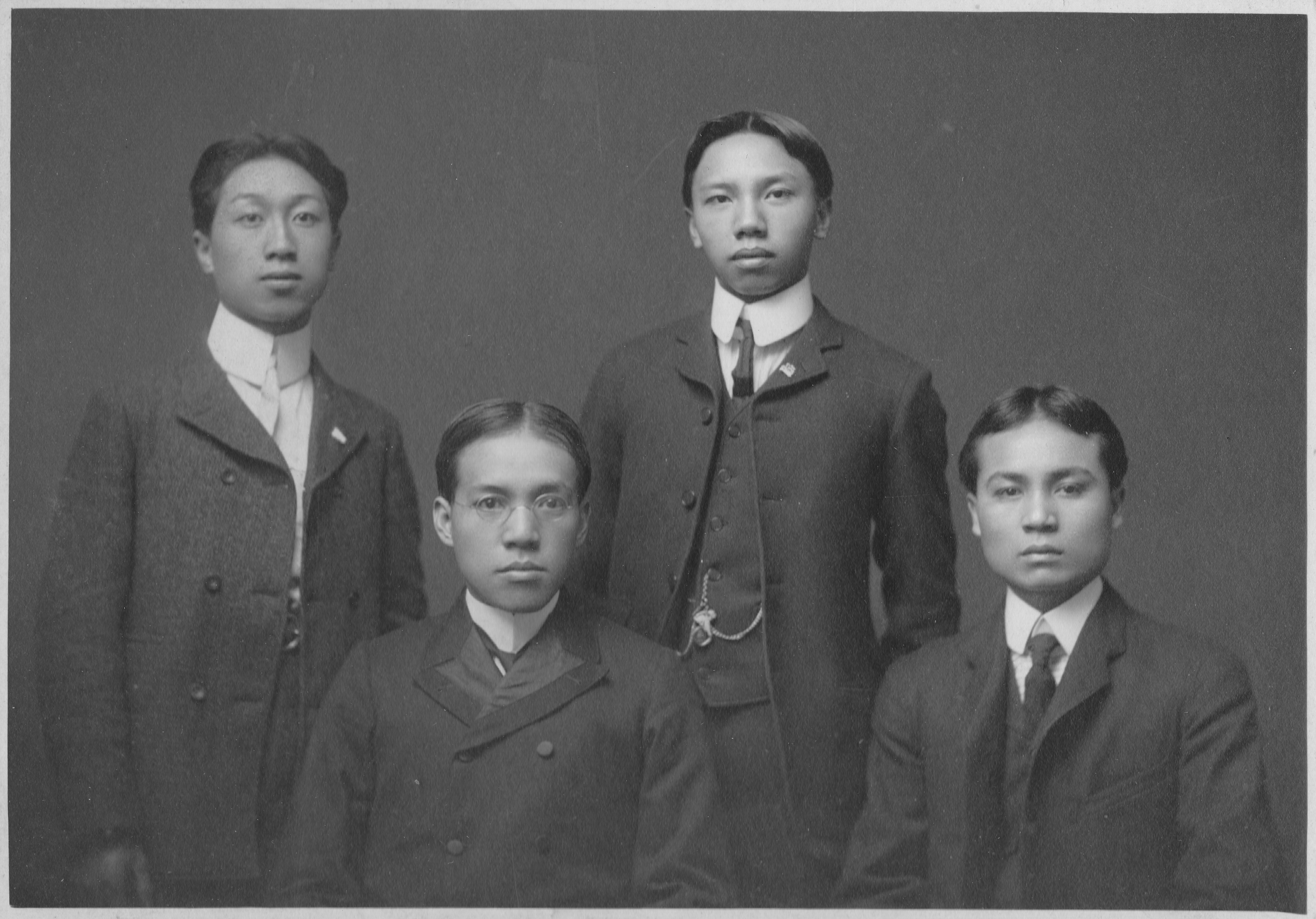
Seated, front: CERA vice president Liang Qichao and his brother Liang Qixun (then living in Chicago), and standing in back: two unidentified men, Portland, Oregon, September 1903; Liang Qichao was on an organizing tour of the United States, having just been in Canada.

Hong Kong, Macau, and Yokohama all functioned at one time or another as Association headquarters, centralizing finances as much as possible. The building commemorating the organization's July 1899 founding is the "first Chinese Empire Reform Association" at 1715 Government Street, Victoria, BC, which has been restored by its current owner and is a repository of the Association's history.

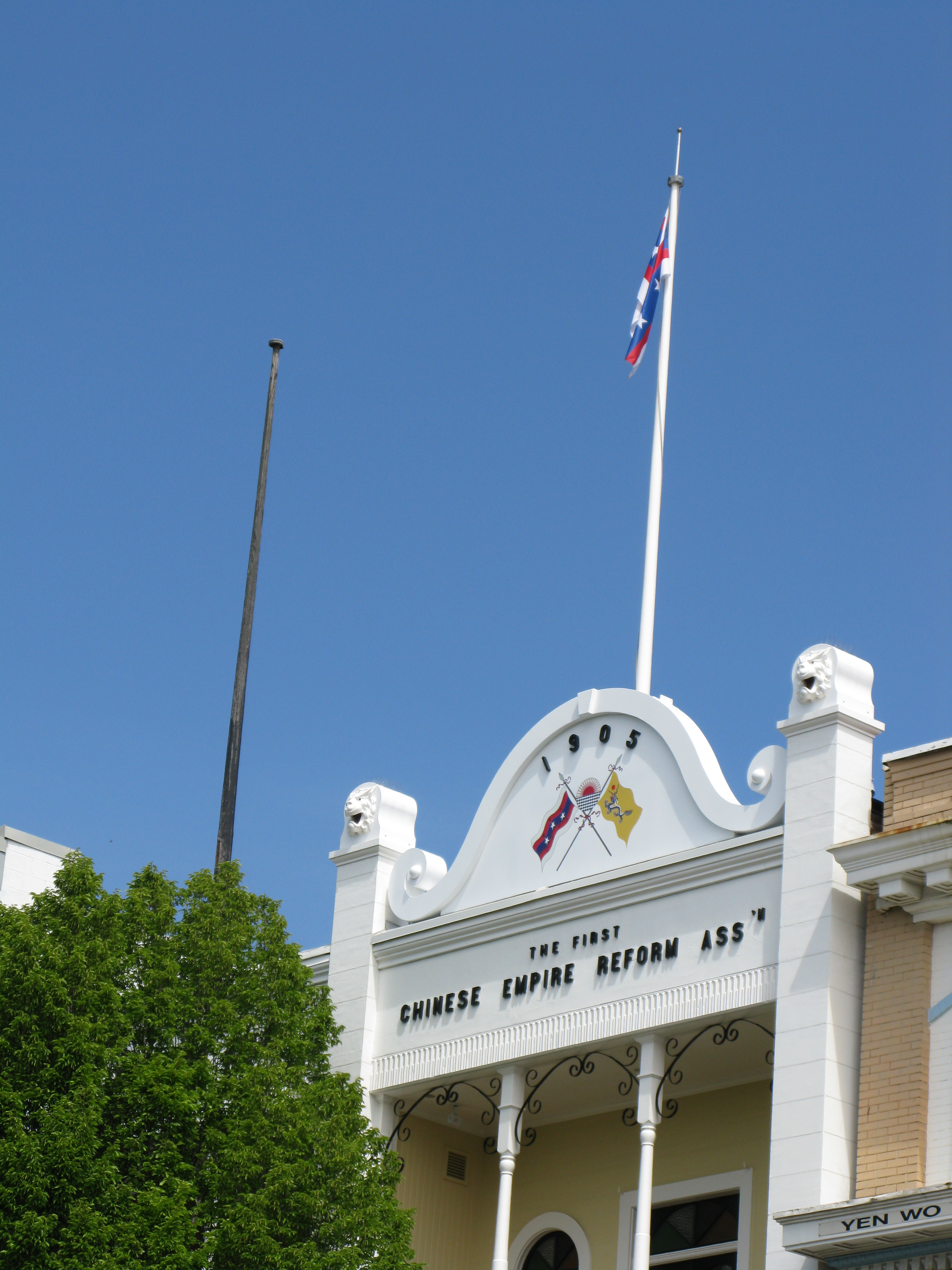
Built in 1905, this is the parapet of the founding Chinese Empire Reform Association building, 1715 Government St., Victoria, Canada, to commemorate the 1899 founding of the association.

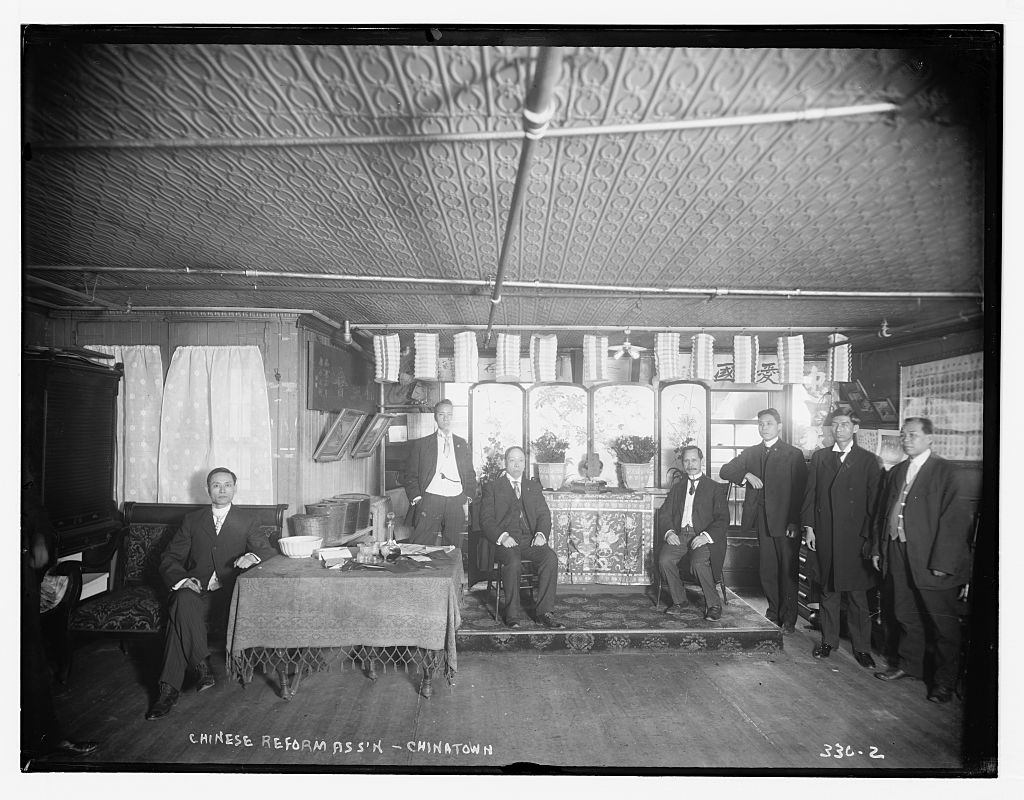
Officers and members in New York chapter headquarters, 7-9 Mott Street, New York City; among those pictured is the chapter president Joseph M. Singleton, sitting to right of table.

Each local chapter was to publicly elect officers, who led weekly member meetings, collected membership fees, and forwarded a portion to the headquarters. Members went on speaking tours, raised shares for businesses and funds for schools, and organized local events (such as celebration of the Emperor's birthday) and political activism. Liang Qichao wrote the Los Angeles chapter's charter in 1903, which describes the purpose of the Association, the most important activities it was to carry out, how meetings should be handled, and the duties of the officers. Many of the local chapters had physical offices or even their own building, which might also serve as meeting places and schools. For example, the New York City chapter occupied different addresses on Mott Street in Chinatown, where in addition to a meeting room, it ran a school, a bank, and a branch of the Western Military Academy; it also operated a newspaper and sponsored a branch of the affiliated women's association. Two plenary meetings convened by Kang Youwei and attended by Baohuanghui leaders representing chapters around the world were held at 7-9 Mott Street in 1905 and 1907.

Association members had obligations to fulfill. In 1905, the charter stated, “Everyone who joins the society will be loyal and righteous to each other and join together as a group (hequn 合群) to rescue the country.” Beginning in 1905, members also had to pay membership fees ($5 in the United States), which were to be remitted to the organizational headquarters to "handle national affairs." The 1907 charter expanded the rights and duties of members and more closely resembled a national constitution. It included such rights as the right to elect Association officers and to be elected to office, the right to appeal if defamed by another member or chapter, and the right to be received as a guest when visiting other chapters. Membership fees to support the organization were equated to taxes paid by citizens of a country to support its administration of national affairs.

To build organizational identity, members received membership certificates when they joined and were encouraged to buy and wear the membership badge (pictured above), which Kang himself had designed. Posters with pictures of the emperor and top leaders as well as chapter officers and board members were sent to other chapters to hang in their offices. The Association flag most commonly featured three white stars on blue flanked by two red stripes against a white background. It might have been designed by Liang Qichao, according to an article in the Philadelphia Inquirer, which described its meaning: "The largest [center] star symbolizes education and the two smaller ones unity and equality. The two stripes stand for liberty and purity." The flag was carried by marching Western Military Academy cadets and its image appeared on the badges, membership certificates, letterhead, chapter posters, the parapet of the founding Association building in Victoria, B.C., and the menu for a 1904 dinner honoring Kang in Vancouver, BC (see image above).

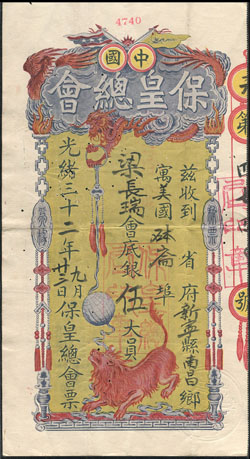
Membership certificate for Portland, Oregon member Liang Changrui, who paid $5; issued November 9, 1906; note Association flag on top left.

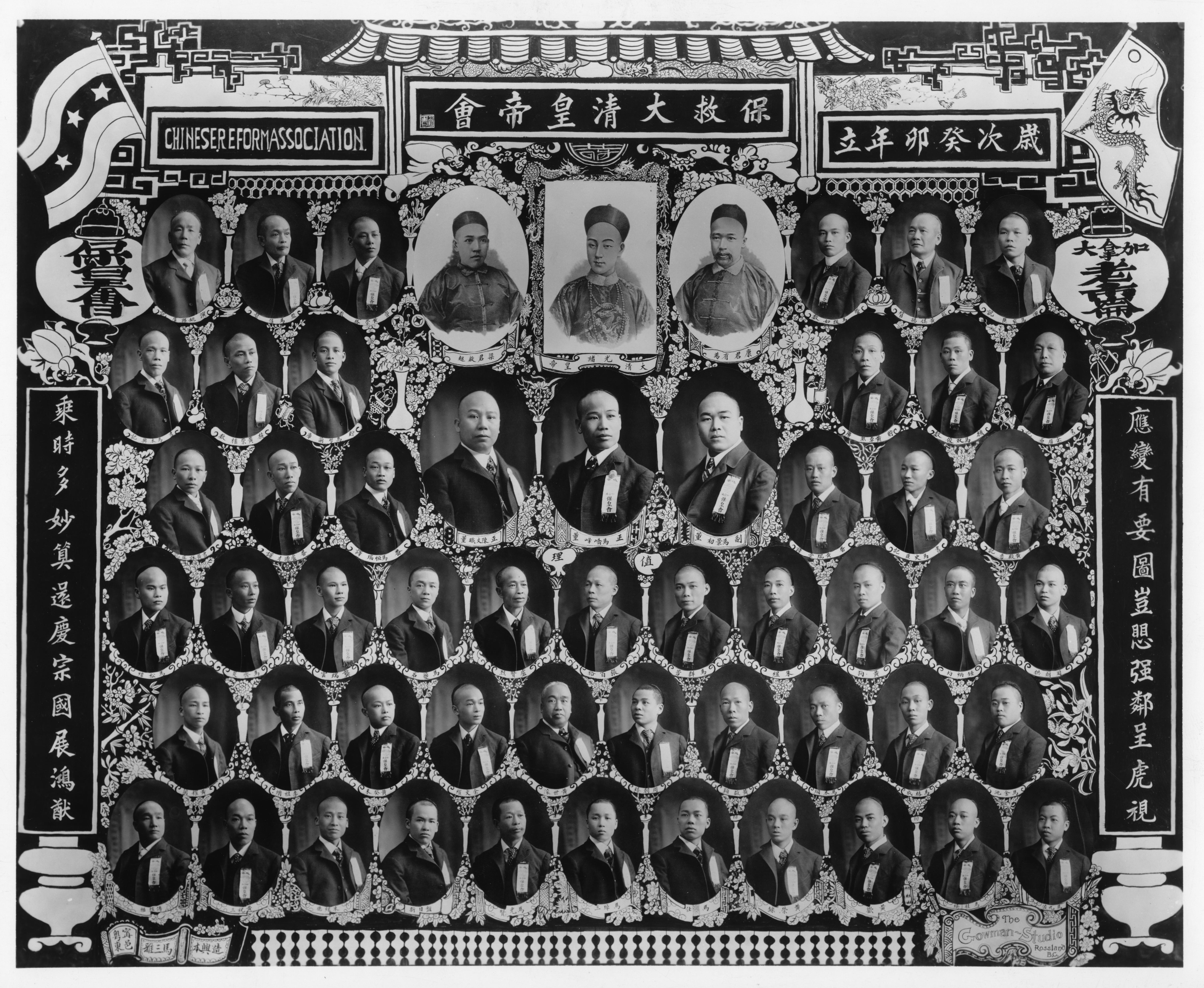
Photo poster of the members of Chinese Empire Reform Association, Rossland, British Columbia, 1903; the Guangxu Emperor is flanked by Liang Qichao and Kang Youwei, with the three top Rossland officers below.

The 1905 and 1907 Chinese Empire Reform Association charters also mandated several divisions, expanding the reach of the organization in local communities. Most significant were those dedicated to military affairs, education, business affairs, support of students abroad, services such as bathhouses to improve sanitation, and encouragement of Chinese immigration to underdeveloped lands where they might prosper.

== Activities ==
While the Association's larger aim was to bring about a constitutional monarchy in China, on an individual level, Chinese Empire Reform Association activities were meant to cultivate citizenship and nationalism in its members. Members were encouraged to read newspapers and listen to speeches in order to learn about the world, especially current events in China, as well as agriculture, industry, and commerce, seen as essential tools for modernization. Local chapter offices had spaces devoted to reading newspapers published by the Association. Traveling activists visited the chapters, making speeches to rouse members to support whatever political activity was most urgent at the time. In addition, the Association organized a network of schools, military academy branches, businesses, women's associations, and newspapers that promoted Association goals and involved thousands of members and many non-members. Finally, the Association sponsored political and military actions, including anti-foreign boycotts, constitutional petitions, and attempted uprisings inside China.

=== Schools ===
The education of members and their children was a priority for the Association. Kang's most devoted disciples were his former students at Wanmucaotang (萬木草堂 Thatched Hut among 10,000 Trees) in Guangzhou. This was an innovative school that blended Kang's reform-oriented version of Confucianism with world history, science, mathematics, and even calisthenics. Beginning in 1898 with the Datong (大同 Great Unity) School in Yokohama, founded by Liang Qichao, a network of schools was established in Japan, Macau, China, Southeast Asia, North America, Honolulu, and Australia. Students typically studied the Chinese language alongside Confucian ethics, Chinese history, science, and physical education. Some schools taught both boys and girls; many used graded textbooks by the progressive educator and Kang disciple, Chen Zibao 陳子褒, which introduced topics using colloquial language and a style appealing to children. Although establishing and staffing schools was a costly venture for the Association, members willingly donated money to support education. Two of the schools sponsored by the Association have survived to the present: Tongwen Xuexiao (Common Culture School 同文學校) in Kōbe, Japan, and Mun Lun School (Minglun Liangdeng Xuetang 明倫兩等學堂 ) in Honolulu, Hawaiʻi.

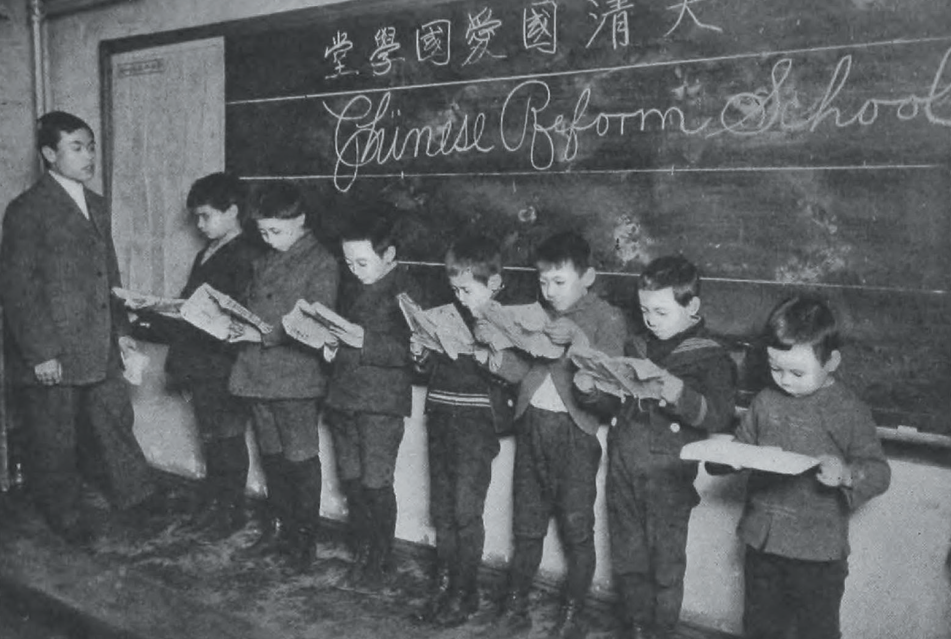
A class at the Patriotic Academy (Aiguo Xuetang), at New York chapter headquarters, 7-9 Mott St., ca 1909.

=== Western military academy ===
Kang Youwei espoused military training and the discipline that it required as essential for "saving China." In the United States, he endorsed the proposal by a young American visionary in Los Angeles whose military expertise came solely from books, Homer Lea, to establish the Western Military Academy (its Chinese name was Gancheng Xuexiao 干城學校 or Shield and Ramparts School). Founded in 1904 by the Los Angeles chapter with retired American military veterans as instructors and a curriculum designed by Lea, the Academy expanded to around 30 branches in the United States, all funded by local Association chapters.

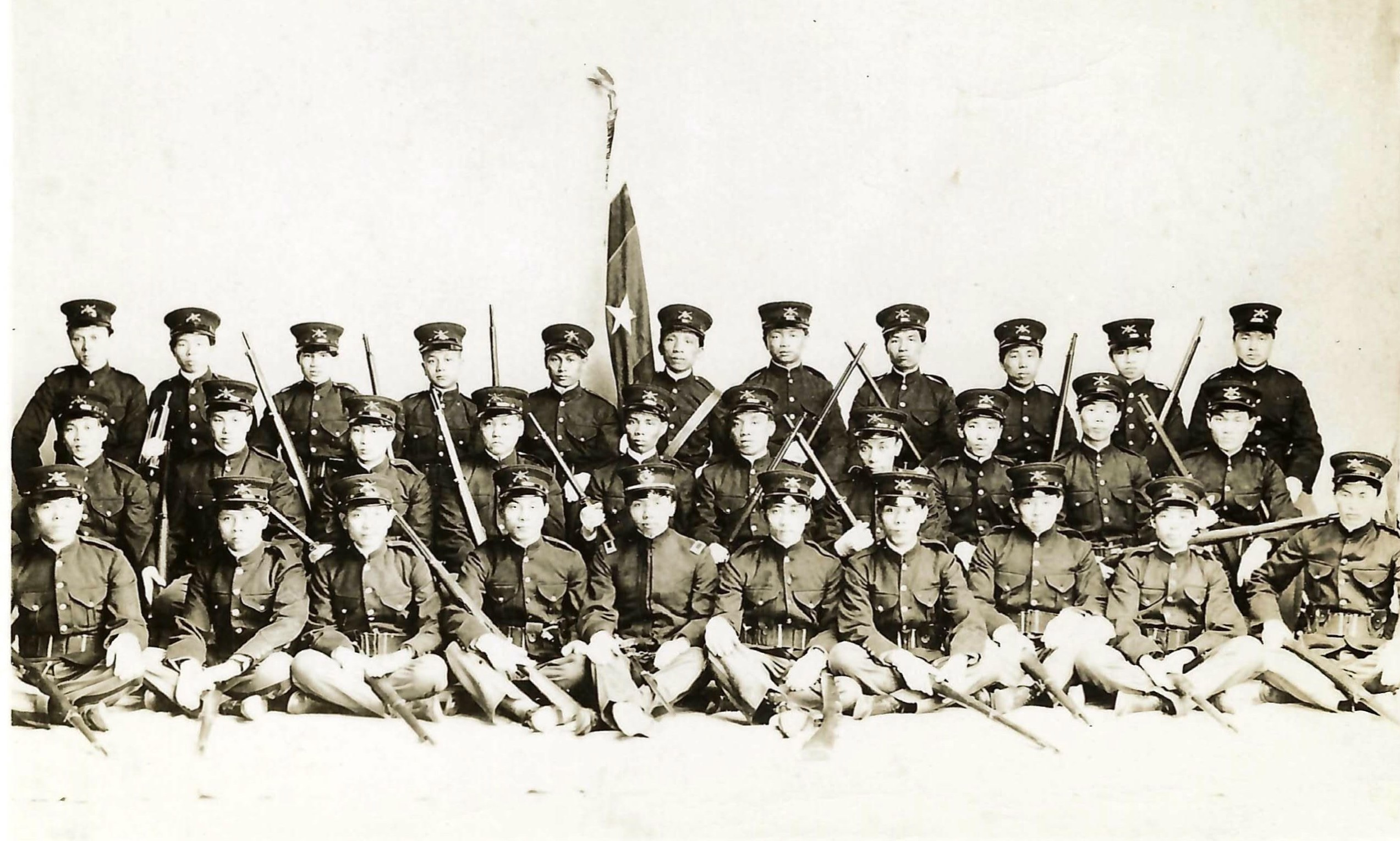
Western Military Academy: Company A, Fourth Infantry (Pacific Northwest), Portland, Oregon, circa 1905.

The cadets wore second-hand American uniforms, learned to drill and use weapons, and made a positive impression not only on their local Chinese compatriots but on American observers, when they marched in formation at the January 1905 Rose Parade in Pasadena or greeted Kang and other dignitaries upon arrival at train stations. The 1905 charter stated that the Association would support the further education of graduating cadets who were admitted by American military schools.

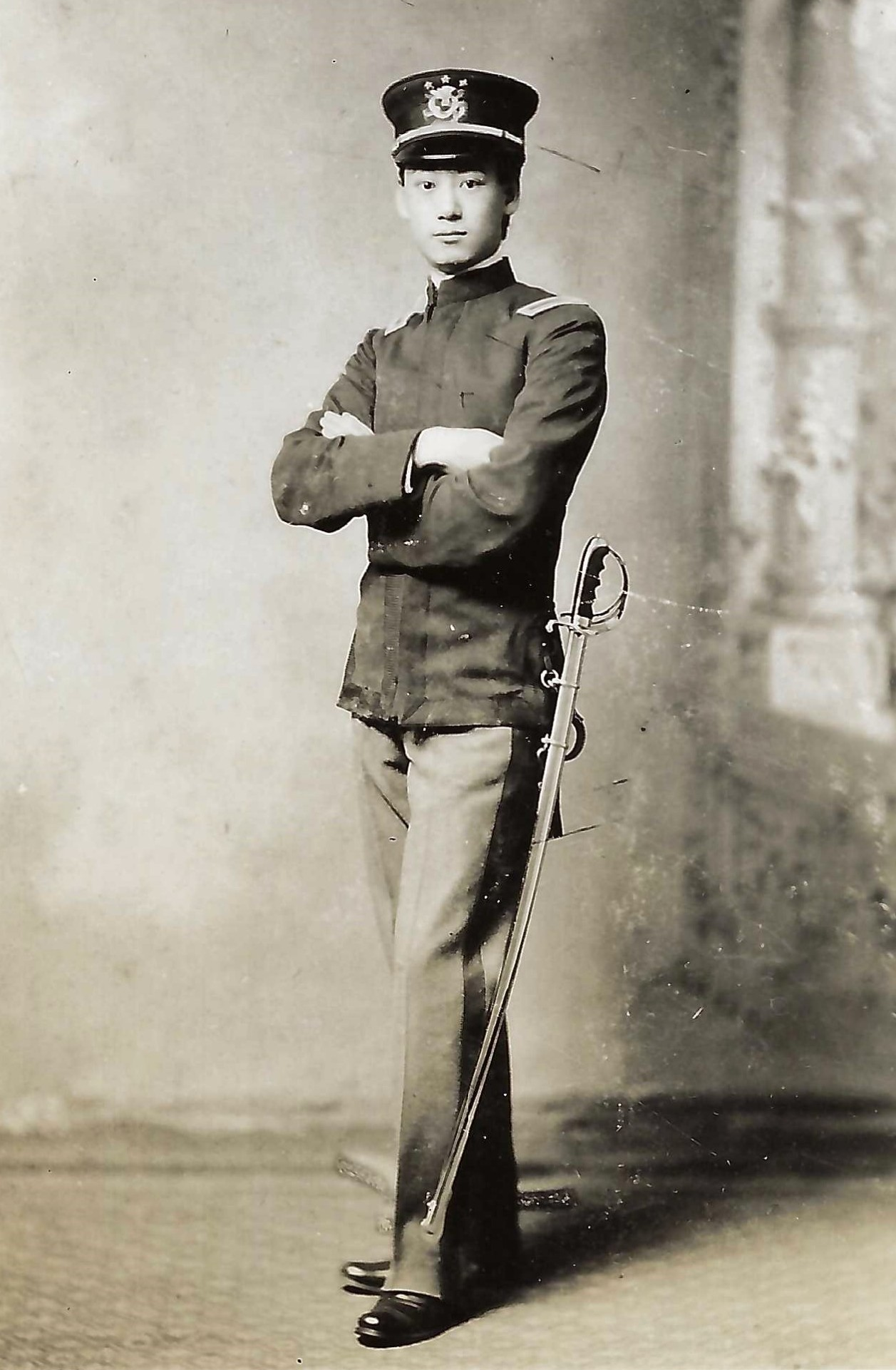
Western Military Academy cadet, identity unknown.

No doubt the pride and patriotism instilled by the Association's military training program would have insured its continued success if it had not been for Lea's many public statements that the Academy was a reform army and he was its General, alerting the governors of California and New York as well as the federal government that the Academy could be violating the law of neutrality by training foreign soldiers on American soil. Kang dismissed Lea in December 1905 and the Academy branches disbanded over time.

=== Businesses ===
Kang had long promoted private enterprise and modern commercial practices as essential for China's strength. Once abroad, he met many successful Chinese businessmen, who helped him found the Chinese Empire Reform Association in 1899 in Canada and led most of the local Association chapters. Taking advantage of their energy and entrepreneurship, Kang, with the assistance of the Hong Kong headquarters and Canadian leaders, proposed a Commercial Corporation (Shangwu Gongsi 商务公司). This multi-national conglomerate was formally established in 1904. Eventually, it encompassed banks, newspapers, book publishing companies, restaurants and hotels, rice brokerages and fishing monopolies, streetcar and steamship lines, railroad investments, mining, real estate, and land development. Members bought shares in the Corporation, and members also managed the companies, with varying success, given that the members Kang trusted the most were his past students, few of whom had business experience. Some of the businesses for which funds were raised never materialized, such as a steamship line between Mexico and China, while others survived far longer than the Association itself, often under leadership of former Association members (e.g., King Joy Lo (1906–26), a Chicago restaurant founded to fund studies abroad for Association youth and sold in 1912 to a group of members).

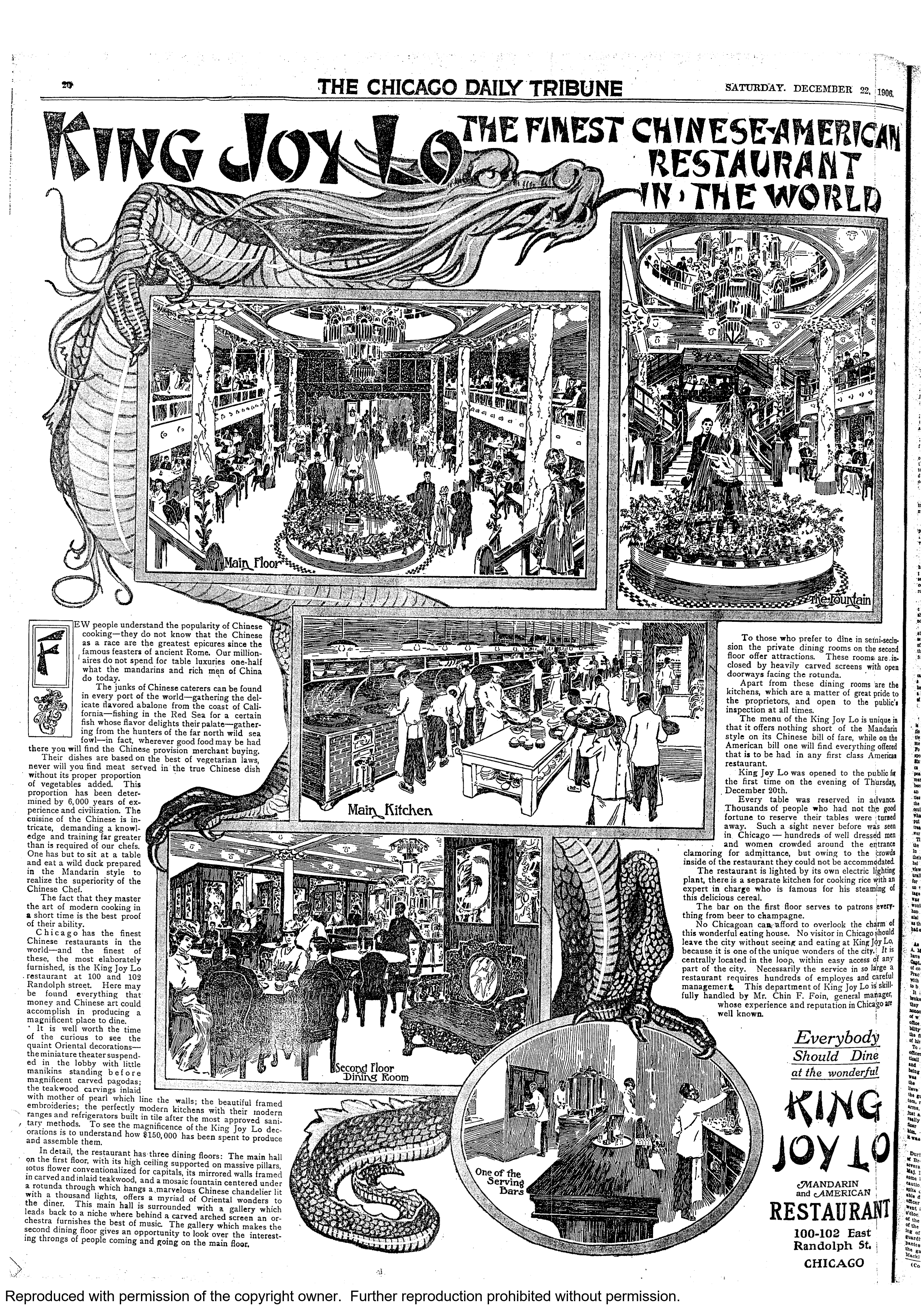
Opening of King Joy Lo Restaurant in Chicago; full-page advertisement, Chicago Tribune, December 22, 1906, p. 20.

The Commercial Corporation began to falter after Kang's 1905–7 sojourns in Mexico, a country that encouraged Chinese immigration and investment. Kang's eagerness to capitalize on the seeming ease of doing business there diverted Association resources into expensive investments—Hua-Mo Yinhang or Chinese-Mexican Bank (and a new three-floor building, named Banco Chino, to house it), tramway line, the proposed steamship line, and real estate development.

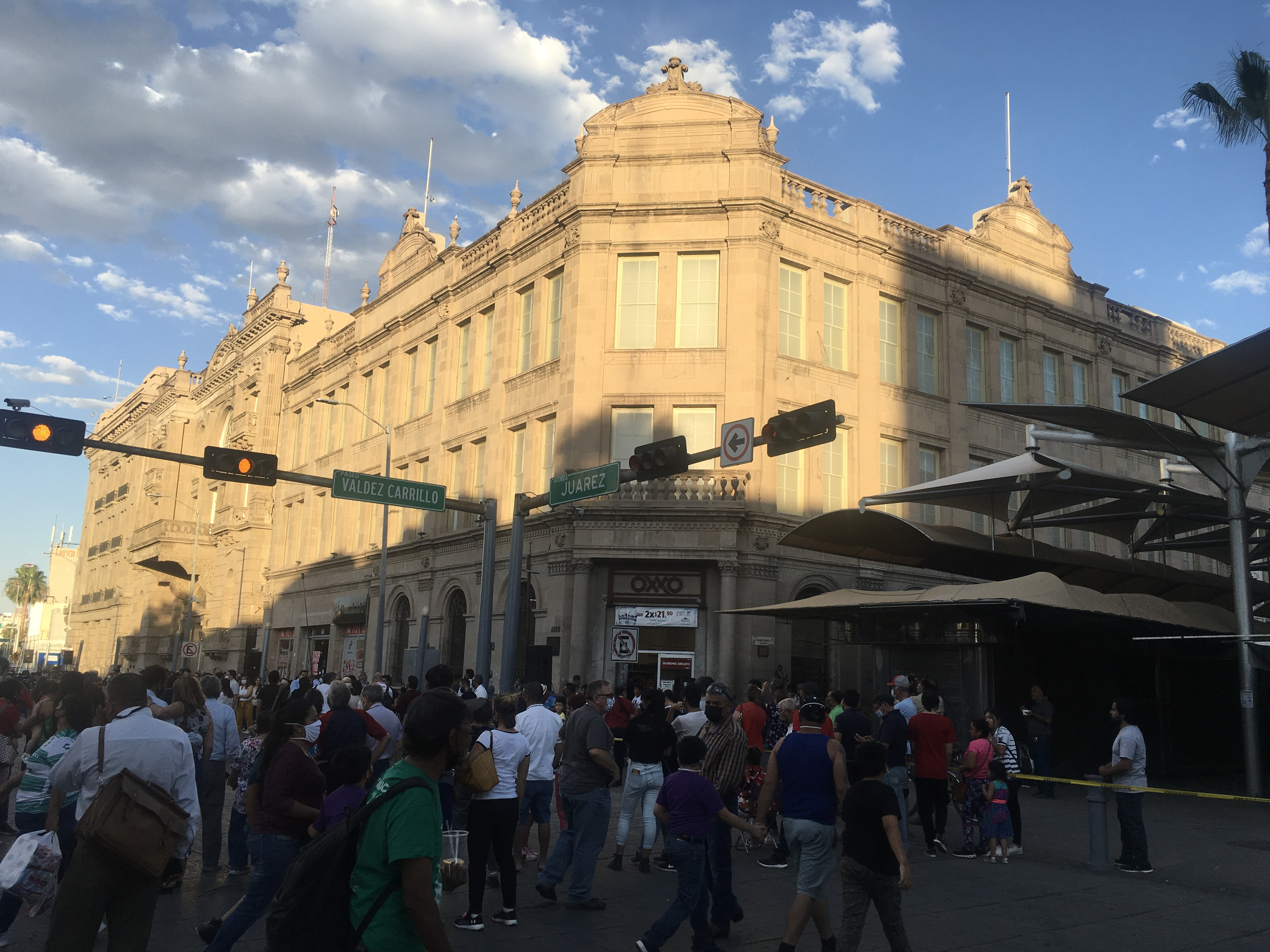
Banco Chino (Huamo Yinhang, Chinese Mexican Bank), corner of Valdes Carrillo and Juarez, Torreón, Mexico, built in 1908 and now the home of Museo Arocena.

While promising at first, a worldwide depression in 1907 and conflict between Kang and some of the members managing Association businesses not only led to the failure of many of the conglomerate's businesses but also to internal dissension and disillusion among Association members. This in turn caused the organization to lose membership to the rising revolutionary faction led by Sun Yatsen.

=== Women's association ===
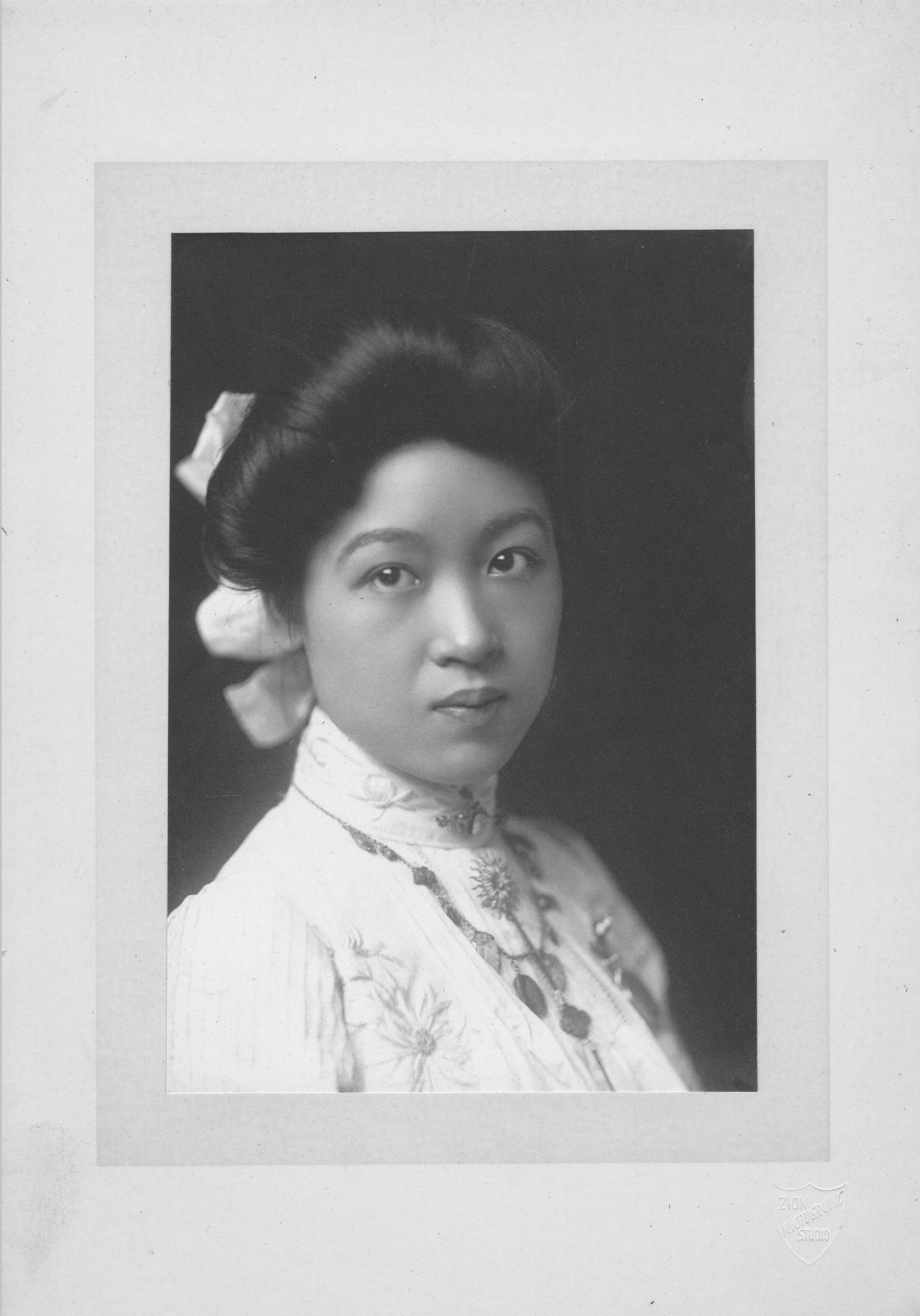
Kang Tongbi has this photo taken in October 1903, at the Zion Photographic Studio, Zion City, Illinois.

Kang Tongbi, Kang's second daughter, came to North America in 1903 in pursuit of an education. She had accompanied him in India in 1902, when he completed writing Datong Shu (The Book of Great Community 大同書), a utopian plan not only for China but the entire world. One of its unusual features was complete equality of men and women. Tongbi thus was primed to advocate for women's rights when she landed in Victoria, BC. Soon after, Tongbi organized the first chapters of the Chinese Empire Ladies Reform Association (Baohuangnühui 保皇女會). Because there were few women among the Chinese immigrants, most of the women's association members were the wives of Association leaders, who were primarily merchants and thus could bring their wives to the United States. Activities included making speeches about women's rights and raising funds for Association projects. A poster of the Victoria women's association pictures Kang, daughter Tongbi, Liang Qichao, and the Guangxu Emperor above photos of each woman officer; couplets herald outstanding "woman warriors" for emulation: Joan of Arc, Ming dynasty general Qin Liangyu, and Russian assassin Sophia Perovskaya. Women's association chapters were formed in North America and Honolulu. Kang Tongbi was just one of several women's association members who spread a feminist message, but her ability to command an audience and get press attention was unique.

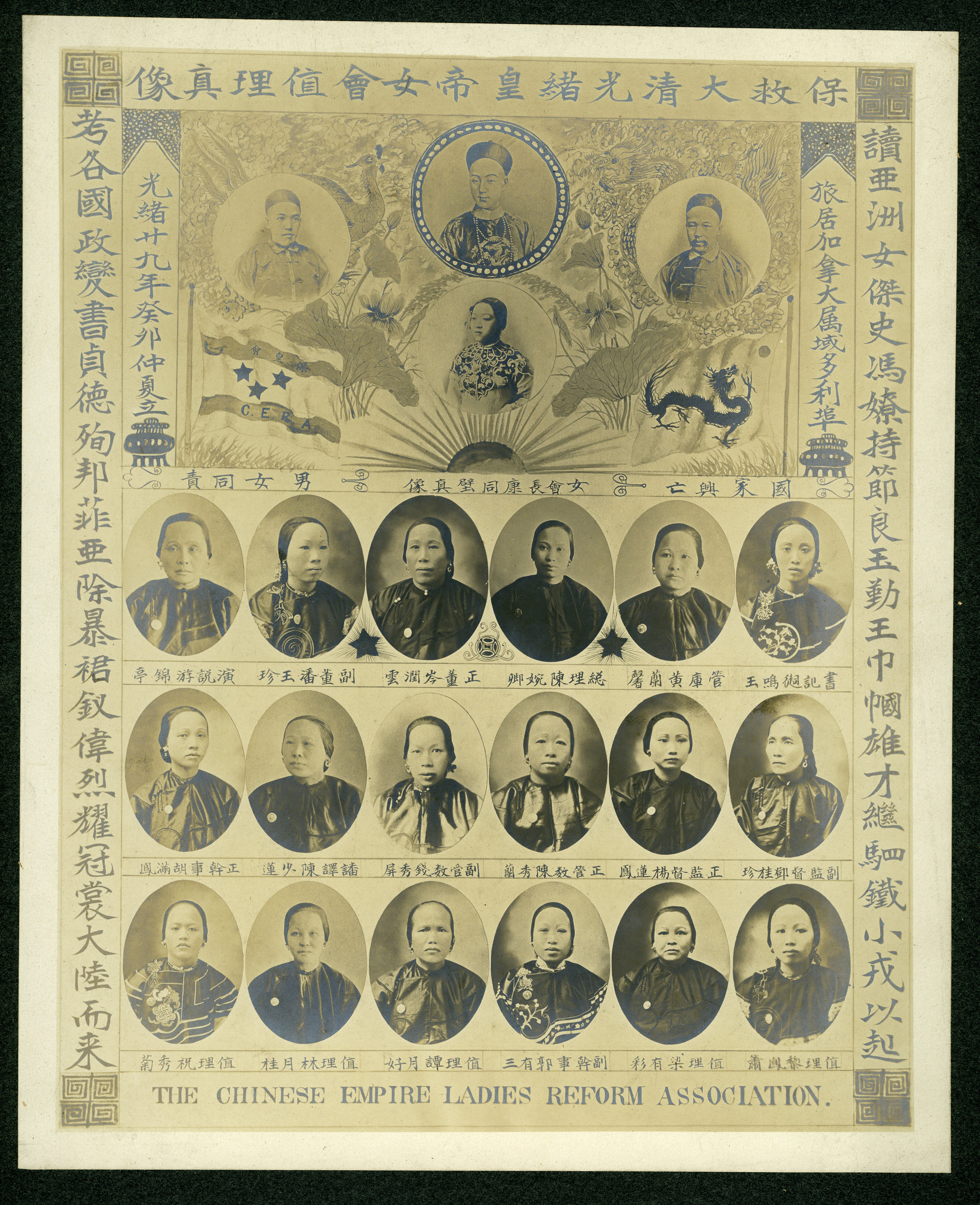
Chinese Empire Ladies Reform Association poster, 1903, picturing the Guangxu Emperor, Liang Qichao, Kang Tongbi, and Kang Youwei, above photos of Victoria association officers.

=== Newspapers ===
A network of about forty Chinese Empire Reform Association newspapers was its most effective tool for promoting the organization in Chinese communities and communicating with far-flung chapters. The first newspapers were begun by the reformers in Macau (Zhixin Bao 知新報, November 1897) and Yokohama, Japan (Qingyi Bao 清議報, December 1898). After the Association was founded in 1899, the network quickly expanded in North America, Southeast Asia, Japan, China, and Australia. Newspaper offices often became meeting places for organizing political actions, as with Shanghai's Shi Bao 時報 in planning the 1905 anti-American boycott (see Political Movements below). Chapters sent their news by telegraph to newspaper offices, which featured regular columns on local activities, including listing new members and donors to various causes. Newspapers in the network reprinted each other's articles and editorials, extending the reach of popular writers, such as Liang Qichao, whose following was greater than Kang's.

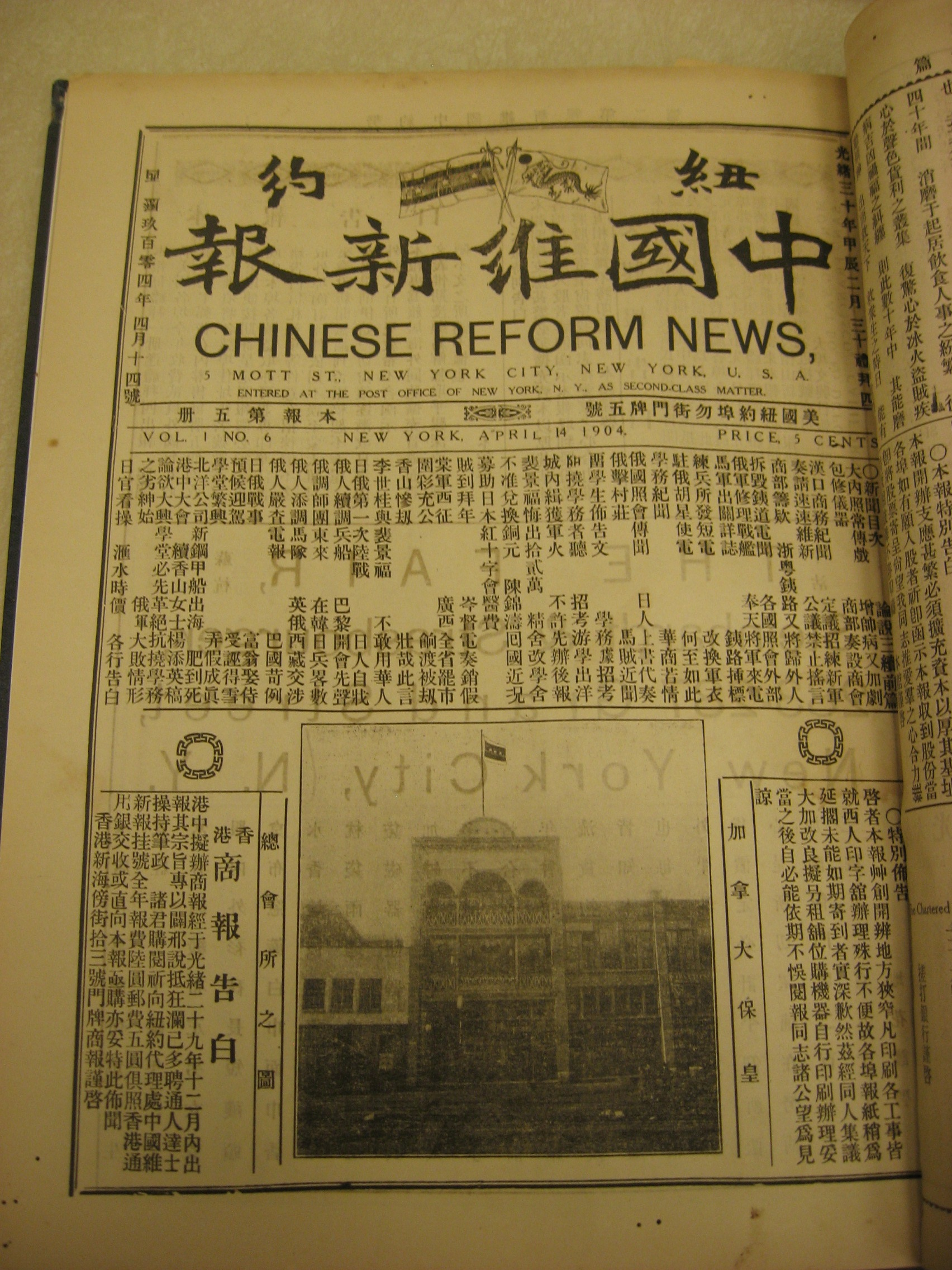
Page 1 of Chinese Reform News (Zhongguo Weixin Bao), New York City, April 14, 1904, with photo of Canadian headquarters, Vancouver, BC (built 1903).

The newspapers covered international and local news, as well as commentary and messages from Association leaders. Only one Association newspaper's complete run still exists, Donghua Bao (Tung Wah 東華報 ), which was published in Sydney, Australia between 1898 and 1936 and contains news of chapters throughout the world.

=== Political movements ===
To influence both Chinese and foreign governments, the Chinese Empire Reform Association organized boycotts (the most famous being the 1905 anti-American boycott to protest Chinese Exclusion), sent petitions and group telegrams to the Qing court, and became directly involved in the burgeoning constitutional movement inside China from 1907 to 1911.

The political issues of greatest concern to the Association were: restoration of the emperor, constitutional government, convening a parliament, transformation of imperial subjects into citizens, Chinese nationalism, women's rights, China's modernization, foreign intervention in China, and anti-Chinese policies abroad. Before the Association could successfully mobilize political action, the members needed to understand why these issues were important to their own lives and for the future of China. Kang and other Association leaders communicated these ideas through speeches, newspapers, group letters and telegrams.

==== Petitions ====
In keeping with Chinese tradition, the Association most often expressed its political positions by submitting memorials and petitions to the Emperor, sending circular letters and telegrams from multiple Association chapters to the Qing court. These were usually initiated by Kang himself and circulated internally or published in newspapers, accumulating supporters, before being telegraphed to Beijing. The first major circular telegram movement was in January 1900, after Kang alerted members that the Empress Dowager planned to depose Guangxu and replace him with 14-year old Prince Pujun. Association chapters from 46 cities sent telegrams to the Qing Foreign Affairs Office in opposition to this move, which were reprinted in Qingyi Bao and Zhixin Bao. Combined with a telegram movement inside China, Cixi was forced to back down from removing Guangxu. When Qing officials went abroad, they would often be approached by members of the local Association chapter conveying their demands in writing. For example, in 1910, Prince Zaitao, a half-brother of Guangxu, visited the United States on an imperial mission to study military modernization and met with Association leaders in Chicago and New York City, receiving their petitions calling for the convening of a parliament.

A particularly intense period for petitions coincided with the Qing government's constitutional preparations between 1907 and 1911, when the Association pressed hard for more rapid implementation of constitutional reforms. This petition movement took place inside and outside China, with those advocating for the convening of parliament and the writing of a constitution including Qing government officials as well as reform-minded Chinese, many of them overseas. A series of constitutional petitions were issued by different combinations of groups, with the most controversial petition written by Kang. This petition was published in Association newspapers (serially because of its length) and circulated among the chapters between July and November 1907 to collect signatures. In July 1908, it appeared for the first time inside China, and brought a strong backlash from the Qing court. The 12-point petition was submitted on behalf of the members of the Xianzhenghui in 200 cities and bemoaned the increasing danger China faced from within (the threat of revolution) and without (foreign aggression). Apart from the usual calls for restoring the Guangxu Emperor to his throne and the election of a parliament that would draft the constitution, the most provocative demands were to change the name of China from the Great Qing Empire, or (Da-Qing Guo 大清國) to China (Zhonghua 中華) and to equalize the status of the majority Han ethnic group with the Manchus (the ethnic group of the Qing rulers whose rights were greater than the Han). These demands so outraged the Qing court that it banned a newly-formed domestic arm of the Xianzhenghui, the Political Information Society (Zhengwenshe 政聞社), which was growing rapidly inside China, and began arresting its members. The result was a radicalization of the constitutional reformers in China.

==== Anti-foreign movements ====
Anti-foreign movements were a powerful political tactic that united members and sympathizers to participate in rallies, boycott foreign products, and raise funds to support the boycotters. The Association was involved in three anti-foreign movements: the anti-Russia movement (1901-5), the anti-American boycott (1905-6), and the anti-Japanese boycott (1908). Just like a war, movements pitting Chinese citizens against foreign nations galvanized nationalism and created a new personal identity as members of a modern nation.

===== Anti-Russia movement (1901–1905) =====
Just as with the other anti-foreign movements, the anti-Russia movement was also directed to the Qing government, Animosity toward Russia arose in 1901 when Russian troops remained in Manchuria after the Boxer Rebellion and the Qing seemed powerless to expel them. The movement was kicked off at a March 24, 1901 rally in Zhang Yuan park in Shanghai, with the first public speech by a woman in China. Seventeen-year old Xue Jinqin (薛锦琴) blamed the fecklessness of China when faced with the Russian troops in Manchuria on the Chinese people themselves, who "regard themselves as helpless babies and left everything in the hands of officials." Xue would soon move to the United States to study and become an activist in the Chinese Empire Reform Association, giving speeches and leading the San Francisco women's reform chapter; she also promised Kang Youwei she would return to China after her studies and assassinate the Empress Dowager. The anti-Russia movement remained potent for several years and in 1904, 132 Association chapters signed a petition supporting the movement, which was published in Association newspapers.

===== Anti-American boycott (1905–1906) =====
China's first mass movement, the anti-American boycott, was triggered by fear that the Qing would agree to the extension of the Gresham-Yang treaty with the United States that excluded most Chinese immigrants from entering the country. Since the 1882 enactment of Chinese Exclusion policies by the U.S. Congress, Chinese of all classes, but especially those who were not officials, merchants, or students, met with increasingly stringent restrictions and harsh treatment when crossing American borders. As the only nationality encountering such treatment, Chinese at home and abroad felt humiliation upon hearing about these policies and the stories told by those sent back to China of their treatment by US immigration officials. The anti-American boycott gave Chinese a tool to protest American discrimination and express their political views to the Chinese government. For a few months in 1905, the boycott mobilized merchants who refused to sell American goods, consumers who refused to buy American products, as well as overseas supporters who lent their voices at rallies and made donations to the boycotting merchants in China. The nationwide boycott was announced on May 10, 1905 by the Shanghai General Chamber of Commerce.

While the organization of the boycott was largely at the direction of China's new chambers of commerce, influential Association leaders were behind its initiation, and the boycott's impact was magnified by the propaganda of the Chinese Empire Reform Association. For several years, Liang Qichao and Association leaders had written lengthy articles in their widely-read newspapers explaining Chinese exclusion policies. In 1903, Chen Yikan (陳儀侃) edited the Association newspaper in Honolulu and wrote a powerful statement proposing that a boycott of American products could influence the U.S. government because of the importance of American trade with China. Kang himself felt strongly about Exclusion, and when he finally was permitted to enter the United States in 1905 (after numerous attempts since 1899), he knew he wanted to speak directly to President Theodore Roosevelt about the harm Exclusion caused to U.S.–China relations. Early in May 1905, he sent a circular telegram to Association leaders in Shanghai, Yokohama, and Hong Kong asking them to take urgent action because U.S Envoy William W. Rockhill had left for China to persuade the Qing Foreign Ministry to sign the exclusion treaty. In Shanghai, the editors of Shi Bao met secretly with two members of the Shanghai Chamber of Commerce who would spearhead the boycott. The newspaper served as a meeting place for boycott organizers and a medium to spread national boycott news. In the United States, Kang spoke to both Chinese and American audiences about Exclusion and the boycott, occasions that were covered in American newspapers. Kang met twice with President Roosevelt in June 1905, resulting in Roosevelt's executive order directing immigration officers to relax enforcement of the regulations. The boycott continued until early 1906 and halved American exports to China between 1905 and 1907. While the Qing refused to sign the Gresham-Yang treaty, the court did finally succumb to pressure by the U.S. government and ordered the boycotters to end the protest.

===== Anti-Japanese boycott (1908) =====
Humiliation brought on by foreign aggression and Qing government capitulation to this aggression was behind the 1908 anti-Japanese boycott. The incident triggering the boycott took place in the Macau harbor on February 5, 1908. The Tatsu Maru, a Japanese ship docked at Macau, was raided by Qing naval officers and its cargo seized—smuggled weapons for revolutionaries in Guangdong. The officers replaced the Japanese flag with the Qing dragon flag, further inflaming the Japanese government, which demanded that the Chinese government apologize and pay for the seized cargo. When the Qing government gave in to these demands, outrage by both Chinese merchants and officials as well as citizens in Guangdong, Hong Kong, and Shanghai, was channeled into a boycott of Japanese products and services, including matches, clothing, tobacco, shipping, and insurance. This affected the Japanese economy and encouraged new Chinese factories to produce what had been imported from Japan. Even more so than in earlier anti-foreign movements, public anger was also directed against the Qing. Notably, there was no boycott support from revolutionaries in China.

The Chinese Empire Reform Association promoted the movement through two newspapers in the region, Guoshi Bao (國事報) in Guangzhou and Shang Bao (商報) in Hong Kong, which became boycott clearinghouses and propaganda arms. It was significant that three major Association leaders were in Guangzhou—Xu Qin (徐勤) and Chen Yikan (the man who first proposed an anti-American boycott)—and Hong Kong—Wu Xianzi (伍憲子). Overseas chapters, particularly in Australia, Japan, and the United States, raised funds and began promoting the strengthening of the Chinese navy. Chinese merchants in Japan turned from exporting Japanese products in China to building domestic factories. The boycott lasted eight months and for the reformers, segued into the constitutional petition movement, highlighted by Kang's petition, described above.

=== Uprisings and violence ===
==== Uprisings ====
One of the first actions of the Chinese Empire Reform Association was the 1900 uprising, or Qinwang (勤王, “Rush Troops in to Save the Throne”), named for its goal of restoring the emperor by military means. Conceived in Japan at the beginning of his exile, Kang, along with Liang Qichao, Xu Qin, and most importantly, Tang Caichang, a radical Hunanese reformer who would lead Qinwang, their plans developed after Kang returned to Asia from Canada in October 1899. Kang had begun to raise funds for an uprising among Association members, who were enthusiastic about this militant approach. Kang also hoped to take advantage of the chaos of the anti-Christian, anti-foreign Boxer uprising, that had swept through China's north and had won Cixi's support. However, the Boxer killings of missionaries, Chinese Christians, and foreigners brought on the military might of the Eight-Nation Alliance (including Britain, the United States, and Japan), with foreign troops invading China and marching to Beijing in April 1900. They occupied the Forbidden City, Cixi and Guangxu having fled to Xi'an for safety. Kang believed that foreign troops and diplomats would see Guangxu and the reform movement as an alternative to the anti-foreign Cixi and would assist the reformers in restoring the emperor to power.

With the Qing distracted in the north, Tang Caichang mobilized five armies along the Yangzi River from west to east, from Hankou in Hubei to Datong in Anhui. These armies incorporated Tang's Independence Army (Zilijun 自立軍) made up of volunteers from Hunan and Hubei, members of the Society of Brothers and Elders (哥老會 Gelaohui, an anti-Qing secret society from the Yangzi River valley), members of Sun Yatsen's Xingzhonghui (興中會 Revive China Society), and even Qing soldiers. One hundred or so volunteers came from the United States and Canada, as did Homer Lea, but they either arrived too late to take part or played no role in the military action. Meanwhile, Kang was in Singapore, dispersing funds to pay the troops, which caused delays in battle plans. All five armies were to rise at the same time, with Tang setting the rising date for August 9. But as Tang waited for Kang's funds to arrive, he postponed the date twice, first to August 19 and finally to August 23. The commander in Datong did not learn of the delay and began his attacks on August 9. Unbeknownst to the other four armies, the Datong troops fought alone for six days against the Qing troops of the Liangjiang (兩江) Viceroy Liu Kunyi (劉坤一) until their defeat. The captured Datong soldiers revealed the plot and Tang Caichang as commander in Hankou. Tang and fifteen other men were beheaded on August 23.

Following the Qinwang debacle, the Qing arrested families of reformers living abroad who had contributed to the uprising, and heightened surveillance of reformers in Hong Kong, Macau, and China. Kang would not support further military actions until another failed attempt in late 1911, when he, Liang Qichao, and Xu Qin conspired with Qing military commanders and their troops in what came to be known as the Luanzhou Mutiny (滦州兵变 Luanzhou Bingbian) to forestall the republican revolution by collaborating with progressive members of the Qing court to install a titular monarchical republic (xujun gonghe 虛君共和).

==== Assassination ====
Assassination appealed to Kang and a close group of Association leaders as a far more direct means of eliminating their enemies than uprisings, whether they be members of the Qing court or their revolutionary opponents. In exile, Kang was a wanted man and thus the target of Qing assassination attempts in Hong Kong, Singapore, and elsewhere, which certainly inspired him to strike back. Kang and Liang Qichao both advocated assassination and idolized famous historical assassins, both Chinese and foreign, and they attempted to recruit daring Association members to volunteer for the task. Considerable funds were expended on supporting these volunteer assassins in carrying out elaborate plots or hiring Japanese assassins when no volunteers came forward. Their primary target was the Empress Dowager Cixi and those close to her. Two notable Association would-be assassins were the young woman student Xue Jinqin, mentioned above, who knew that Cixi enjoyed meeting students recently returned from studies abroad, and Kang's close friend, the businessman and martial artist Liang Tiejun 梁鐵君, who set up a photography studio in Beijing to gain entry to the Forbidden City, knowing of Cixi's fascination with being photographed. Xue's studies in the United States were being funded by the Association, but after four years, Kang wanted her to return to China in 1906, which she was unwilling to do. Liang intended to carry out Cixi's assassination during the big celebrations for her November 1906 birthday in the Forbidden City, but his plot was uncovered in August, and Liang was arrested and poisoned. This failure brought an end to the reformers' assassination plots against Cixi and also coincided with Cixi's edict to establish a constitutional system, welcomed by the reformers.

A little-known assassination plot initiated by Kang against Sun Yatsen emerged in 1904, during Sun's extensive travels in the United States, just as Kang planned to enter the country himself. The plot is revealed in a collection of 1904–5 letters written to Kang's daughter Tongbi when she was living in South Windsor, Connecticut. Sun visited many cities where the reform association had chapters and had won the attention of members, if not their commitment to Sun's revolutionary cause, alarming Association leaders. Newspapers run by reformers and revolutionaries were carrying out editorial wars in many countries, polarizing public opinion and bringing slander suits. Kang felt personally threatened by Sun, and he was warned by chapter leaders that because guns were freely available in the United States, he would be in danger. Kang's obsession with assassinating Sun, whose whereabouts were often secret and hard to trace, continued during Kang's nine month trip in 1905, when Sun was not in the United States (he left in December 1904). Kang kept hearing rumors of Sun's imminent return to New York and cancelled a planned return to the city at the end of his trip. An inner circle of Kang's followers were part of the plot, including his daughter Kang Tongbi, whom he wrote in October 1905: "If he [Sun] is not in New York, I want you to follow him and bear in mind that your goal is to murder him." Kang had also heard from Liang Qichao that Chinese revolutionary students in Japan were plotting to assassinate the emperor. Assassination of Sun, claimed Kang, was the only way he and the emperor could feel safe. Sun did not return to the United States until November 1909, by which point Kang had gone back to Asia. It is worth noting that Kang never visited San Francisco, although it had an active chapter, a newspaper, and the largest Chinese population in the United States—it was the location of the Chee Gong Tong (致公堂 Zhigongtang) headquarters, a powerful secret society allied with Sun, and its leader, Wong Sam Duck (黄三德 Huang Sande), later wrote that Sun had asked him to assassinate Kang.

=== Successor and related political parties ===
In 1909, just as internal conflicts over management of the Association businesses and disputes within the leadership began to corrode morale, Sun Yatsen returned to North America to make speeches and work with experienced revolutionary leaders who edited newspapers, organized the Young China Association, and openly recruited members to the once slow-growing Tongmenghui (同盟會 Revolutionary Alliance). Even while the Chinese Empire Reform Association was disintegrating, in China, the constitutionalists were gaining true political power as legislators in the new national and provincial assemblies in 1910 and 1911. Some of the most influential leaders of the provincial assemblies (ziyiju 諮議局) and national Political Consultative Council (Zizhengyuan 資政院) were followers of Kang and Liang. In late 1910, presidents of several provincial assemblies gathered to form what would be the first officially registered political party in China. It was named Diguo Tongyidang (帝國統一黨 Imperial Unification Party) by Liang Qichao and later renamed the "Friends of the Constitution Association" (Xianyouhui 憲友會) in 1911.

The Qing Dynasty and imperial China ended with the surprise Wuchang Uprising that began October 10, 1911 (Sun Yatsen was raising funds in the United States and learned about the uprising from an American newspaper). As soon as the news got out, reform association buildings and leaders were attacked by revolutionary revelers, their flags were torn down, and offices ravaged. Association members also celebrated the overthrow of the Qing, and for those who were loyal to the constitutional reform mission, there was a pervasive feeling of humiliation.

The Xianzhenghui became the Xianzhengdang (憲政黨 Constitutional Party) in late 1912 under the new Republic of China. In early 1912, Kang had first named the new party Guomindang (Citizens' Party) until this name was taken by the Nationalists. The party never became active in China, but retained some followers overseas, sustaining two long-lived newspapers. Shijie Ribao [世界日報 Sai Gai Yat Po, Chinese World) in San Francisco closed in 1969, and Xin Zhongguo Ribao (新中國日報, New China Press) in Honolulu survived until 1978. In 1945, the Xianzhengdang was revived as the Chinese Democratic Constitutional Party (Zhongguo Minzhu Xianzhengdang 中國民主憲政黨) with active chapters in San Francisco, Hawaii, and Montreal. Its political stance was both anti-Nationalist and anti-Communist, and during the Cold War lobbied the United States government to support a "Third Force" led by the exiled former Republic of China vice president Li Zongren, who was living in New York City.

Kang and Liang Qichao, both exiled in Japan, were pardoned by the Qing on October 30, 1911 and free to return to China. Liang returned to China in 1912 and became active in politics, founding the Democratic Party (Minzhudang 民主黨), which merged with other small liberal, constitutionalist parties to form the Progressive Party in 1913. Kang remained in Japan until the death of his mother in Hong Kong in 1913, settling first in Shanghai and finally in Qingdao, where he died in 1927.
