= David Z. T. Yui =

Chinese Protestant Christian leader

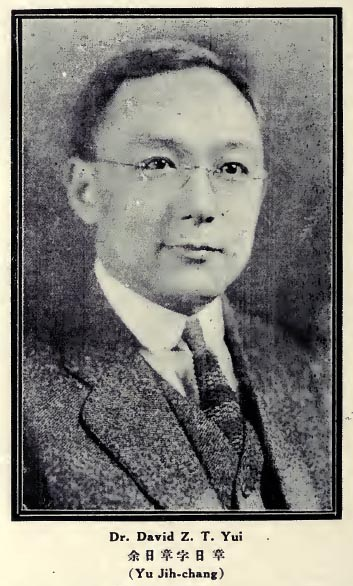
David Z.T. Yui

David Z.T. Yui (Chinese: 余日章; pinyin: Yú Rìzhāng; Wade–Giles: Yü Jih-chang; 25 November 1882, in Wuhan – 22 January 1936) was a Chinese Protestant Christian leader who led the Chinese National YMCA. in the 1920s and 1930s.

Yui was a leader in what the historian Daniel Bays called the "Sino-Foreign Protestant Establishment", a generation of Chinese Protestant Christians who worked to make Christianity independent of foreign control and relevant to the emerging Chinese nation.

== Early life ==
David Yui's father, Yu Wenqing, was an Episcopal pastor who took his family to various parts of Eastern China as he moved from pastorate to pastorate. David was schooled at home until he was thirteen. In 1895, he entered the Boone School, which was run by the American Episcopal Church Mission in Wuhan. When the school was evacuated to Shanghai in 1900 from fear of Boxer Rebellion, the students were transferred to St. John's College, where Yui's classmates included the future diplomat Wellington Koo. Yui edited the school newspaper, the St.John's Echo. Upon graduating in 1905, he returned to Wuhan to teach at the Boone school.

In April 1905 he married Liu Qiongyin, a graduate of St. Hilda's School for Girls in Wuhan. Their families had arranged this marriage before the two were born, and they had known each other all of their lives.

Among Yui's students was Francis C. M. Wei, who would go on to be president of the school and a national church leader. The arrest of a fellow teacher for his revolutionary activities made Yui seem suspicious to the police. At the request of the Episcopal Bishop, the American embassy in Beijing brought pressure on the local government to protect the teachers at his school, but the Bishop still felt it was prudent for Yui to leave the country. Yui enrolled at Harvard University in the fall of 1908.

At Harvard Yui pursued a master's degree in education, which he took in 1910. In 1909 he was among a group of Chinese Christian students who formed the Chinese Students Christian Association in North America, and he traveled from campus to campus to organize chapters and recruit members. However, before he could carry out plans, word of his younger brother's illness called him back to Wuhan, where he became head of the Boone School. The 1911 Revolution broke out in the city of Wuhan, and Yui briefly worked for Li Yuanhong, the head of the new revolutionary government.

== Liberal Christianity and Chinese nationalism ==
After the establishment of the Republic of China, Yui worked both in government and Christian posts. In 1916 he entered the leadership of the Chinese YMCA. He succeeded C.T. Wang as general secretary in 1918, making the Chinese National YMCA the first mission-founded organization to turn control over to Chinese citizens. In 1921, the Shanghai Chamber of Commerce commissioned Yui and Chiang Monlin to attend the Washington Conference, the post-war planning conference, as observers, where he went against the wishes of the Beijing government and negotiated for the redemption of the Shandong railroad from Japanese banks. Upon his return to China, he organized a drive to raise forty million Chinese dollars, which paid off the debt.

Bays notes Yui was a leader in a group that included such men and women as Cheng Jingyi, James Yen, and missionaries such as Frank Rawlinson who took practical steps to produce a Christianity that was Chinese, not simply an extension of Western Christianity, and to make the Chinese church independent of foreign control, as the YMCA had done. Making Chinese Christianity relevant to Chinese nationalism was more difficult. The first decades of the twentieth century were what Bays calls the "golden years", during which many Chinese saw Christianity as a tool to strengthen the Chinese nation and a way to build a modern Chinese society. Under Yui's leadership, the Chinese National YMCA addressed the social issues central to building the nation, for which he invented the phrase "saving the nation through character". The Y created a Lecture Bureau that mounted national campaigns to spread knowledge of science to the common people, and created a National Mass Literacy Campaign headed by James Yen that extended literacy education to some five million people across the county. Yet, while membership in city chapters doubled, some Christians perceived that this caused a decline in spiritual values in favor of social improvement.

The Western rejection of China's claims for equal treatment at the Versailles Peace Conference in 1919 undercut these favorable views and fostered populist nationalism in the early 1920s. The Anti-Christian Movement of 1923 denounced Christianity as imperialist. Liberal Protestants, on the one hand, had built schools, universities, churches, and service organizations that were the basis of a new middle class, but on the other hand liberal groups recognized that they could not create national political organizations to address social problems and defend the nation. But these groups feared and rejected the violent approaches of the Nationalist and Communist parties.

The National Christian Council elected Yui chairman in 1922. He served in that position as well as heading the YMCA, becoming an officer in the World Student Christian Federation, and founding the Chinese Council of the Institute of Pacific Relations, which he led to the 1927 meetings in Honolulu. In 1928 he went to Jerusalem for the International Missionary Council. These responsibilities put a burden on his health. After the Japanese army occupied Manchuria in 1931, Yui went to the United States to rally support for China. On 4 January 1933 he suffered a cerebral hemorrhage while in Washington, and returned to Shanghai in August. He never recovered his health and died in Shanghai in 1936.
