= The Christian Occupation of China =

1922 non-fiction book

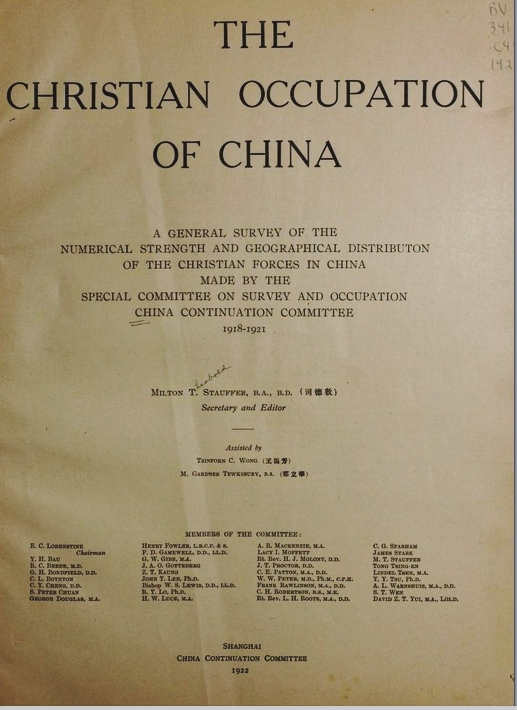
- Title page
- Author: Milton Stauffer
- Publication date: 1922
- Publication place: Shanghai
- published simultaneously in Chinese 中華歸主/中华归主 (Zhonghua Gui Zhu, literally "China for Christ")

The Christian Occupation of China: A General Survey of the Numerical Strength and Geographical Distribution of the Christian Forces in China, Made by the Special Committee on Survey and Occupation, China Continuation Committee, 1918-1921 is a book published in 1922 simultaneously in English and Chinese by the Special Committee on Survey and Occupation, commissioned by the China Continuation Committee, headed by Milton T. Stauffer, assisted by Tsinforn C. Wong, and M. Gardner Tewksbury. The volume was intended as a progress report on the status of Christian churches in China, including social and economic background and local conditions, in preparation for foreign missionaries to turn control over to Chinese Christians, but instead, partly because of the provocative title of the English version, was one of the provocations of anti-Christian movements of the early 1920s.

== Background ==
Protestant Christian groups from all parts of the world met in Edinburgh, Scotland in 1910 for the World Missionary Conference. Leaders called for greater cooperation among Protestant denominations and soon set up regional Continuation Committees. John R. Mott, the strongest advocate of these developments, visited China in 1913 to organize this work. Regional meetings led to a national conference in Shanghai in March and the formation of the China Continuation Committee. The Committee in turn formed a Special Investigation Committee. Edwin Carlyle Lobenstine of the American Presbyterian Mission and Cheng Jingyi headed the committee and more than 150 people worked for more than three years to research and prepare the committee's report.

The original aim of the committee had been to promote Christian missionary work, but the committee chose to interpret their goal as to understand China as a society. They included coverage of all administrative zones, cities, demographic statistics, ethnic groups, language and dialects, economic situation, transportation, education, medicine.

The volume is prefaced with "Definition Of What Constitutes Adequate Missionary Occupation," by Robert E. Speer, a leading American proponent of Protestant missions. Speer defines "adequate missionary occupation" as first, "establishing within a reasonable time an indigenous Church, which through its life and work will propagate Christianity and leaven the nation or field within whose borders it stands." Speer's second criterion is that, "in cooperation with this Church, of presenting Christ to every individual with such clearness and completeness as to place upon him the responsibility of acceptance of or rejection of the Gospel."

Lobenstine, as executive secretary of the Continuation Committee, wrote that "the coming period is expected to be one of transition, during which the burden of the work and its control will increasingly shift from the foreigner to the Chinese." He pointed out that "many of the ablest and most consecrated Chinese Christians" have a "very intense and rightful desire that Christianity shall be freed from the incubus of being regarded as a 'foreign religion' and ... they regard the predominance of foreign influence in the Church as one of the chief hindrances to a more rapid spread of Christianity in China."

Many Chinese were alarmed by the title, however, which contributed to the anti-Christian movements, and the title was widely criticized within the mission community as well. The title in Chinese, writes historian Daniel Bays, was fine — Zhonghua gui zhu (China for Christ) — but the English title was a "public relations disaster." Across China protests broke out, contributing to a strong anti-Christian movement in 1923. The historian Zhang Kaiyuan suggested that from the point of view of a Chinese, the slogan "Rooting the Christian Church in China," suggested by Francis C. M. Wei or "Christianity Settles Down in China," put forward by Frank Rawlinson, would have suggested a "friendly spirit of communication on an equal basis" and would have "weakened the arrogant colonialist gesture" of the past.

== Contents ==
The Christian Occupation of China, English edition.

The contents include: List of missionary societies, geographical and political divisions of China, language areas, population, communications, non-Christian religious movements, progress (1900–1920), Christian occupation (by Province), unclaimed areas, work with other nationalities, Christian work among special classes [aboriginal tribes, Tai/Dai, Hakka, Muslims, overseas Chinese, government students and Christianity, the blind, post and telegraph workers, rickshaw men, work with boys, YMCA, YWCA, Stewart Evangelistic Fund, work among foreigners]. The Chinese Church, status of Chinese pastors, religious education, commercialized vice, alcoholism, education, Bible schools, agricultural missions, medical work, comparison of mission hospitals, health education, leprosy, narcotics, tuberculosis, health of missionary families in China. Christian literature, Roman Catholic literature, Roman Catholic and Russian Orthodox church missions in China. Provincial statistics, postal maps, mission stations and hospitals.
