= Missionary conference =

Missionary conference may refer to:

== Conferences ==
- 1888 London Centenary Missions Conference
- 1900 New York Ecumenical Conference
- 1910 World Missionary Conference
- Edinburgh 2010 Centennial World Missionary Conference
- China Centenary Missionary Conference
- United Missionary Conference of the National Council of Churches of Kenya

== Denominations ==
- Institutional Missionary Baptist Conference of America
- Maranatha Bible and Missionary Conference in Muskegon, Michigan, owner of the former WMBC-LP radio station
