= Frank J. Rawlinson =

American Protestant Missionary in China

- Born: 9 January 1871; Langham, Rutland, England
- Died: 14 August 1937 (aged 66); Shanghai, China
- Other names: (simplified Chinese: 乐灵生; traditional Chinese: 樂靈生; pinyin: Le Lingsheng; Wade–Giles: Le Ling-sheng)
- Occupation: Protestant Missionary
- Known for: Editor, Chinese Recorder

Frank Joseph Rawlinson (9 January 1871 – 14 August 1937) born in Langham, Rutland, England, was an American Protestant missionary to China from 1902 to 1937 known for his theologically liberal views, openness to Chinese culture, and support for Chinese nationalism. From 1912 to 1937 he was editor of The Chinese Recorder and Missionary Journal, published in Shanghai, the leading English-language journal of the Protestant missionary community.

== Early life and the "Call to China" ==
Frank and his younger brother came to the United States in 1889 as steerage passengers and settled in Baltimore. Frank joined a Southern Baptist church, where he met Carrie Mae Dietz. He graduated summa cum laude from Bucknell University, in Pennsylvania in 1899, and quickly married Carrie Mae. In 1903 he graduated from Rochester Theological Seminary, was ordained, and became an American citizen. In 1894, when the Student Volunteer Movement (SVM) organized campaigns, he had stood up at a meeting organized by a missionary from China and said "Here I am Lord! Send me!" In 1900 when John R. Mott of the SVM spoke, he heard "The Call" again, and successfully applied to be appointed as a missionary for the Southern Baptist Convention. He, his wife, and his son arrived in Shanghai on October 16, 1902 and began work with the Central China Mission. In June 1911, Rawlinson was appointed Assistant Editor on the editorial board of The Chinese Recorder, and in 1914, joined the executive committee of the China Continuation Committee, which was formed to carry out in China the work of the 1910 World Missionary Conference. In 1913 he became editor-in-chief of the Recorder, a post which he retained until his death.

In 1916, the family returned to American on the Japanese steamer Shinyo Maru for furlough. Shortly after Christmas, Carrie Mae slipped on the ice, fractured her hip, and on January 7, 1917, died from a blood infection. Frank's grief was compounded when the family Baptist church refused to allow a non-Baptist friend deliver the eulogy. On the steamer from Shanghai, the family had struck up a friendship with Florence Lang, who was herself returning from Bombay, where she worked as General Secretary of the YWCA. Florence and Frank renewed their friendship, and Frank soon wrote her that he thanked God for his "resurrection." Although the Southern Baptist Board had reservations as to whether she was capable of representing Baptist values in China, they were married July 29, 1917. Their son, John Lang Rawlinson, was born in 1920.

During the furlough year, Frank earned an M.A. from Teachers College, Columbia University, where he took courses on schools and religious education. Bucknell awarded him an honorary D.D. Upon his return to China in 1918, he resumed a busy schedule. He lectured at the Nanking University School for Missionaries, and after 1921 was a lecturer at the North China Union Language School in Beijing. Lecturing to new missionaries on how to adapt to Chinese culture led Rawlinson to read the Chinese classics. In addition to Confucius and Mozi he read modern Chinese scholars such as Liang Qichao and Hu Shih. Physically and spiritually happy in his new marriage, he began to develop a more favorable understanding of Chinese religions, especially Buddhism. Although he was often away from home, Frank and Florence conducted extensive discussions on family, their relationship, and theology by letters. In one letter he compared her to "the smile of God," but explained that he found his faith moving away from its evangelical foundations. He described his Call as "a vision of human need that has never left me..., (but) it is true that I have changed my ideas on how to meet it."

== Social Gospel, nationalism, and revolution ==
After World War I, the New Culture Movement advocated a scientific approach to politics and religion, and began to oppose foreign influence in China. At the same time, an influential group of Protestant missionaries in China worked to build what the historian Daniel Bays calls a "Sino-foreign Protestant Establishment" which saw Chinese nationalism and Chinese Christianity as working together to build a modern and independent nation. Rawlinson was a leader in this group.

As Rawlinson read more widely in Chinese classics and Buddhist texts, which he now could read in Chinese, he began attacking the dogmatism of the mission community and the public at home. Chinese ideas of God, he told his students, might possibly compare favorably with early Hebrew ideas. Christians should not denounce Buddhist conceptions of love, compassion, and self-sacrifice but realize their strength. President John Leighton Stuart of Yenching University offered Rawlinson a position teaching Christian apologetics in 1920, but it fell through because his Southern Baptist mission board declined to fund it. Rawlinson was a founding member of the Yenching Life Fellowship Movement sponsored by Christian faculty members. Chinese Recorder published a number of articles from this group who were working for dialogue between Chinese intellectuals and Christians and for a Chinese Christian Church which would be "of the Chinese, for the Chinese and by the Chinese."

The Chinese Recorder under Rawlinson's editorship became a forum for debate on theological questions and the political claims of Chinese nationalism. The journal sought out articles by and about Chinese intellectuals and commissioned translations to present important thinking on politics and religion. For instance, the May 1920 issue of the journal included "Christianity and the Chinese People," by Chen Duxiu, who would be the co-founder of the Chinese Communist Party. Pearl S. Buck, for instance, in 1927, well before she became famous, published an article "Is There A Place for the Foreign Missionary?" Later, her resignation under pressure from the Presbyterian Board in 1932 troubled him.

These liberal views antagonized the Southern Baptist Mission Board, at that time in the beginning of the controversy between modernist and fundamentalist conceptions of theology and the role of missions. The Board objected to the fact that Rawlinson edited an interdenominational journal, not a Baptist one. In 1921 the Board dismissed him. Rawlinson acknowledged to Florence that this was a "hard kick," but reported that he had "not yet been kicked very far." The American Board of Commissioners for Foreign Missions, which supported interdenominational work, accepted Rawlinson in 1922. Rawlinson was one of the prime organizers of the National Christian Conference held in Shanghai in May 1922. The Conference surveyed the state of Christianity in China, pushed for Chinese control of Christian institutions, and set up the National Christian Council of China to carry out this program. He supported Chinese Christian leaders such as Cheng Jingyi, who led the Council. Cheng and other leaders aimed to develop a Chinese Christianity which was not based on independent denominations but on a unified church. Rawlinson edited the Council's Chinese Christian Yearbook from 1922. Confucian teachings continued to attract him, and he confessed in a letter to Florence that "I am something of a pagan."

From 1924 to 1925 Rawlinson studied and lectured as a McFadden Mission Fellow at Union Theological Seminary in New York. On his return to China he found that Chinese politics had become even more nationalistic and anti-Christian. Kenneth Scott Latourette, the leading scholar of missions at the time, reflected a feeling shared among liberal missionaries such as Rawlinson that the Church had "become a partner in Western imperialism and could not well disavow some responsibility for the consequences."

In 1926, Rawlinson published Chinese Ideas of the Supreme Being and in 1927 his most important work, Naturalization of Christianity in China. The motivation behind both was to meet the arguments of the hot Chinese nationalists and anti-Christians who attacked the church as irredeemably imperialist and irrational and to convince his fellow mission Christians to cede authority not only over the institutional church, a process which was already well under way, but to also cede the authority to define who was a Christian and what was Christian doctrine. The book drew from his years of talking to Chinese intellectuals and lecturing to newly arrived missionaries. He prepared the arguments for the book in a series of editorials. He first argued that being a Christian was not a matter of church membership -- "a Christian is one who loves Christ. Nothing more, nothing less." Next, he challenged critics who claimed that China lacked the capacity to organize, citing in rebuttal the record of imperial China in organizing and administering its large territory. Nor did he accept the argument that Chinese cared little for morality or the individual, since the philosophies of Daoism and Buddhism did so, and Chinese family values were exemplary. He pointed out that the ancient Chinese had stated the Golden Rule long before Jesus. In short, a Chinese Christianity was possible but the main obstacle was Western refusal to accept Chinese as equals and recognize the strength of Chinese culture, The burden was on the Christian church to itself become Chinese:

Christianity will not be naturalized in China until the Christian ideal of equality is embodied in the attitudes and conditions of Christian work in such ways as the actual as well as the potential moral equality of the Chinese is so unmistakably recognized that the Chinese have no doubt about it.

In the end, Rawlinson concluded that a Christianity naturalized to China would leave denominations and sectarianism behind and not even cling to Christian ideas of salvation.

Rawlinson argued that Christianity could not succeed in China if it was identified with either imperialist domination or capitalist exploitation. In particular, he pointed out that it was "somewhat humiliating" to force China to grant permission for "Christian aliens" to build churches and propagate their religion under protection of extraterritoriality. He welcomed Chinese colleagues into the leadership of Christian institutions and supported the anti-imperialist program of the Chinese Nationalist Party. The spread of Marxism raised serious questions, however. Rawlinson approved the egalitarian social aims which Chinese communists announced while condemning their violent methods. In 1934, the Chinese Recorder ran a series of articles on "The Challenge of Communism," the title of a missionary conference. Rawlinson conceded that if it sought a "juster and more equitable social order," communism was supportable. In that year, Chiang Kai-shek launched his New Life Movement as an answer to communism's social appeal. Rawlinson applauded, but looked to the Rural Reconstruction Movement for a Christian approach to the problems of China's rural majority. Rawlinson's June 1934 editorial, "Beyond Communism," reminded readers that as doctrine Christianity was "adverse" to capitalism but in fact had accommodated to it easily enough. Now Christianity found that communism had "stolen its thunder," for Christianity had never set out to "change the entire lot of the underprivileged as communism has." Christianity was preferable to communism but had to prove itself in action.

The outbreak of the Second Sino-Japanese War posed a challenge to the Christian missionary. In what turned out to be Rawlinson's last letter to his children on August 3, 1937, he told them "I do not like war. I feel that it is unChristian," yet "I don't know what else China can do but resist Japan unless she wants to become practically a Japanese colony."

On August 14, 1937, a Chinese fighter plane, damaged by anti-aircraft fire from a Japanese battleship in the river, accidentally dropped a bomb onto a crowded Shanghai street, killing over 1,500 people. Rawlinson was among them. The New York Times reported his death on the front page. Life magazine ran a group of pictures of Rawlinson and his wife and called him "one of the most influential white men in China," commenting that Rawlinson "felt China could take Christianity without ceasing to be Chinese."

== Selected works ==
- Francis Lister Hawks Pott; Frank Joseph Rawlinson (1915). 滬語開路 = Conversational exercises in the Shanghai dialect / Hu yu kai lu = Conversational exercises in the Shanghai dialect. Shanghai: Shanghai mei hua shu guan.. HathiTrust full view.
- —— (1922). The Chinese Church as Revealed in the National Christian Conference Held in Shanghai, Tuesday, May 2, to Thursday, May 11, 1922. Shanghai: Oriental Press. OL 7158673M.
- —— (1925). "Evolution of "Christian" Treaty "Rights" in China". Chinese Recorder.
- —— (1927). Chinese Ideas of the Supreme Being. Shanghai: Presbyterian Mission Press.
- —— (1927). Naturalization of Christianity in China (a Study of the Relation of Christian and Chinese Idealism and Life). Shanghai: Presbyterian Mission Press.
- —— (1929). Revolution and Religion in Modern China: A Brief Study of the Effects of Modern Revolutionary Movements in China on Its Religious Life. Shanghai: Presbyterian Mission Press.
- —— (1929). "Modern Revolution and Religion in China". International Review of Mission. 18 (2): 161–178. doi:10.1111/j.1758-6631.1929.tb03937.x.
- —— (1934). Chinese Ethical Ideals: A Brief Study of the Ethical Values in China's Literary, Social and Religious Life. Shanghai.

== See also ==
- American Southern Baptist Mission

== Works cited ==
- Bays, Daniel (2011-07-13). "The "Golden Age" of Missions and the "Sino-Foreign Protestant Establishment," 1902-1927". A New History of Christianity in China. Oxford, UK: Wiley-Blackwell. pp. 92–120. doi:10.1002/9781444342864.ch5. ISBN 978-1-4443-4286-4.
- Latourette, Kenneth Scott (1929). A History of Christian Missions in China. New York: Macmillan.
- Xi Lian, Ch. 2 "The Road that Bent: Frank J. Rawlinson" in Lian, Xi (1997). The Conversion of Missionaries: Liberalism in American Protestant Missions in China, 1907-1932. University Park: Pennsylvania State University Press., pp. 59–93
- Rawlinson, John Lang (1990). The Recorder and China's Revolution: A Topical Biography of Frank Rawlinson, 1871-1937. Notre Dame, Indiana: Cross Cultural Publications. ISBN 9780940121133. Written and edited by Rawlinson's son John, a professional historian of China. Incorporates extensive primary documentation and commentary on events of the time.
- Standaert, Nicolas and R.G. Tiedemann (2009). Handbook of Christianity in China Volume Two 1800-Present. Brill Academic. ISBN 9789004114302.
