= Samuel Damon =

Samuel Damon may refer to:

- Samuel C. Damon (Samuel Chenery Damon, 1815–1885), missionary to Hawaii
- S. Foster Damon (Samuel Foster Damon, 1893–1971), American academic, critic and poet
- Samuel Mills Damon (1841–1924), businessman in Hawaii
