= Chongzhen Church =

Oldest Christian Church in Wuhan, China

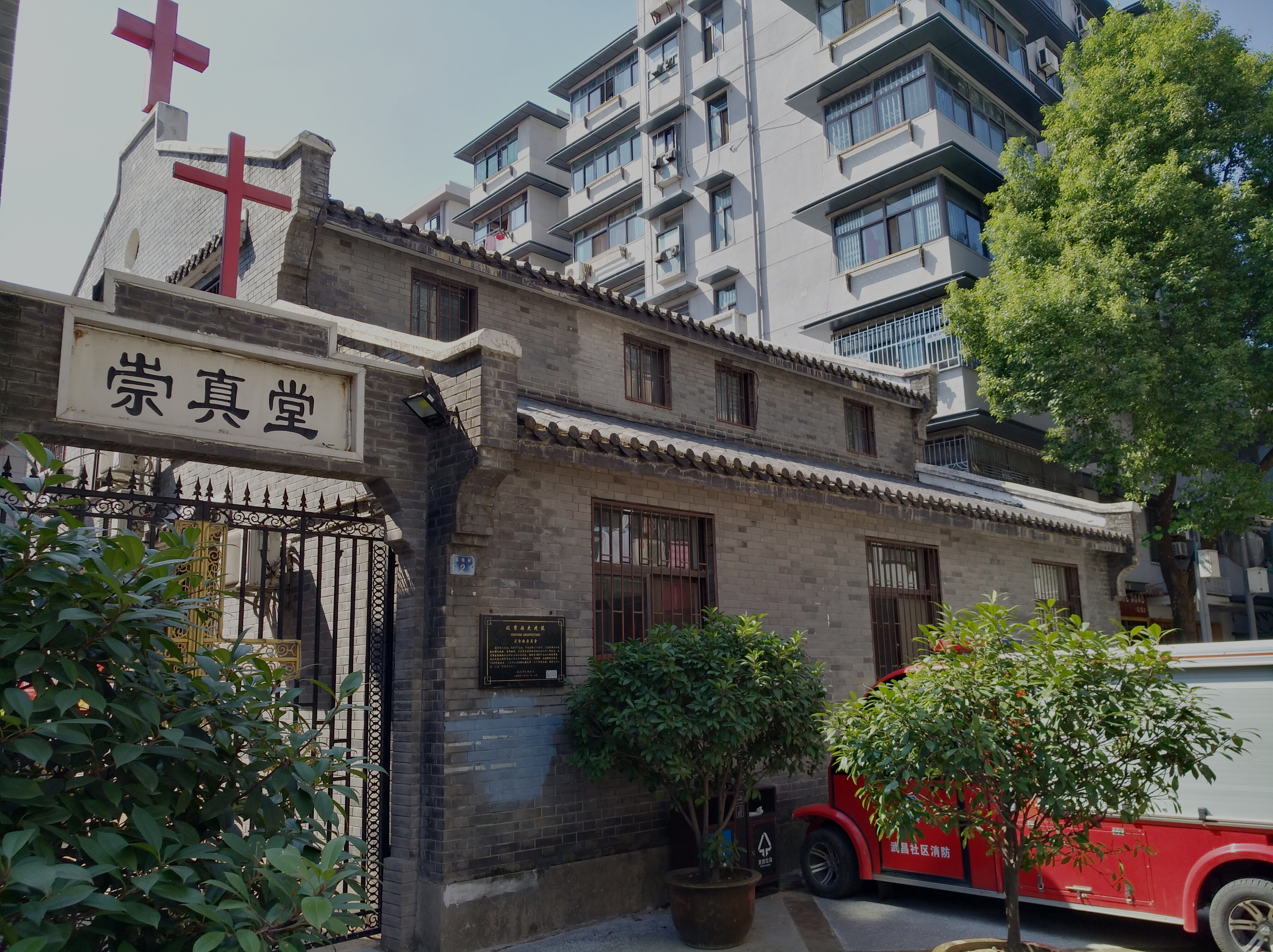
Christian Chongzhen Church

Chongzhen Church (Chinese: 崇真堂; pinyin: Chóngzhēntáng; lit. 'worship truth church'), full name Christian Chongzhen Church, is the oldest Christian Protestant church in Wuhan, China. It was designed in a Gothic style and can accommodate 400 people in its main sanctuary.

== History ==
In 1864, Chongzhen Church was built in Gejiaying neighborhood of Wuchang, Wuhan under the leadership of Griffith John, a missionary from the London Missionary Society. It was the first Christian church in Wuchang, the provincial capital of Hubei.

The church joined the Church of Christ in China, and the first Chinese pastor was Bao Tingzhan. Foreign missionaries also worked at the church.

In 1951, the church became one of the learning centers of the "three-self" revolution study group. In 1958, united worship was implemented resulting in a merger between the staff of Chongzhen Church and the Life Church at Hanyangmen; the building was converted into a paper mill warehouse.

In 2005, the church was listed among the "Second Batch of Outstanding Historical Buildings in Wuhan City", with the reasons given as "A typical Gothic building, the It

== Description ==
Located at No. 44, Gejiaying, Wuchang District, Chongzhen Church, Chongzhen is the oldest existing Protestant church in Hubei Province and Wuhan City.

The church is a single-story Gothic architecture, featuring a flat Latin cross layout and pointed arches. It is a brick-and-wood structure with a construction area of 1,200 square meters. In addition to the main hall, the church has a small garden, a two-story western-style building where pastoral staff lived, and two large classrooms for an attached school.

The church was renovated and expanded in 1895 and again in 1924. A major renovation took place in 2000 to restore its historical architecture and functionality as a place of worship.
