= Hop Yat Church =

Coordinates: 22.2834°N 114.1473°E

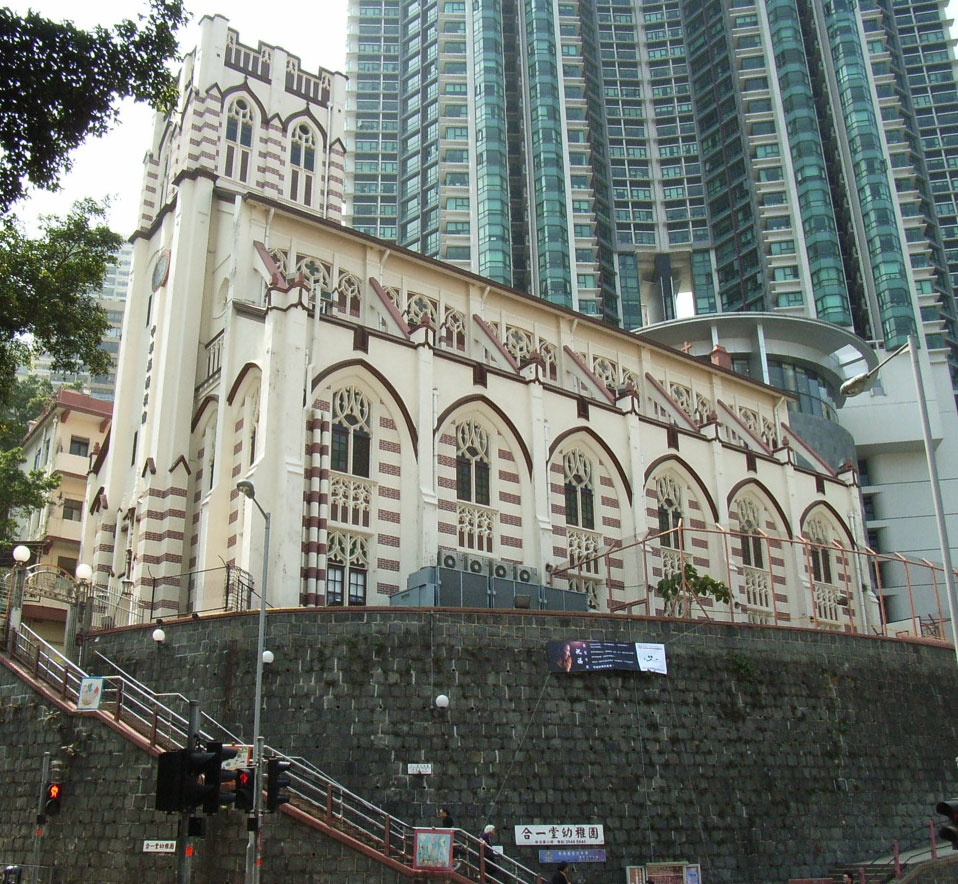
Hop Yat Church (Hong Kong); No. 2, Bonham Road, Mid-levels, Hong Kong

The Hop Yat Church (Chinese: 合一堂), full name "Church of Christ in China Hop Yat Church", is a member of the Hong Kong Council of the Church of Christ in China. Built in 1926, the church was the first self-governed Chinese church in Hong Kong, and has now been designated as a Grade I historic building. It is located at No. 2 Bonham Road, Mid-levels, Hong Kong; in a Neo-Gothic style and with a clock tower.

== History ==
In 1843, Pastor James Legge of the London Missionary Society (now the Council for World Mission) moved the Ying Wa College, which he had founded in Malacca, to Hong Kong. They dedicated themselves to evangelistic work outside of class, and all the new Chinese believers were baptized at the college, which was known as the "Ying Wa College Guild".

In 1862, the Chinese Self-Governing Association was established; and missions were set up in Sheung Wan and Sham Shui Po.

In 1885, Mrs. Gao Sangui, a female believer, sold a plot of land on Hollywood Road to the London Missionary Society at a favorable price for the construction of a hospital and a church. In 1888, the Chinese Self-Governing Association's To Tsai Church (道濟會堂) and Alice's Rizal Hospital were completed on this site.

In 1910, the system of elders was changed to a church council (management system).

In 1921, To Tsai Church joined the Church of Christ in China and changed its name to "To Tsai Church of the Church of Christ in China." It was Sun Yat-sen's place of worship while he studied Medicine in the Hong Kong College of Medicine for Chinese located within Alice's Hospital. To Tsai Church was one of the first independent churches in China.

In 1922, Alice Hospital moved to Bonham Road and merged with Nethersole Hospital for expansion. To Tsai Church, due to its contiguous land title, also moved at the same time.

The construction of the new church was fraught with difficulties. Strikes in Hong Kong and Guangdong halted construction several times before it was finally completed in 1926. The church was built in a Neo-Gothic style. The clock tower was a local landmark for many years. Following a public vote, the church was named "Hop Yat Church" (合一堂), and the elders' titles were changed to "Deacons". The church became the earliest independent Chinese church in Hong Kong.

In 1941, during the Japanese invasion, the Hong Kong churches fell to the Japanese. After the liberation in 1945, Hop Yat Church was rebuilt and flourished even more than before.

In September 1955, the Hop Yat Church Kindergarten was opened. In 1957, the Kowloon Branch Church was completed and opened.

In September 1960, The Hop Yat Church Primary School was founded.

In September 1984, the North Point Branch Church was completed and opened, and the Hop Yat Church Chan Pak-hung Memorial Kindergarten was also established.

In 1997, the Ma On Shan Branch Church was completed and opened, and the Hop Yat Church Shan Jia Chuan Memorial Kindergarten was opened to nurture children in the area. In the same year, the "Hop Yat Church Senior Citizens Centre" (Elderly Day Activity Centre) was opened at Harbour City on Tanner Road, North Point.

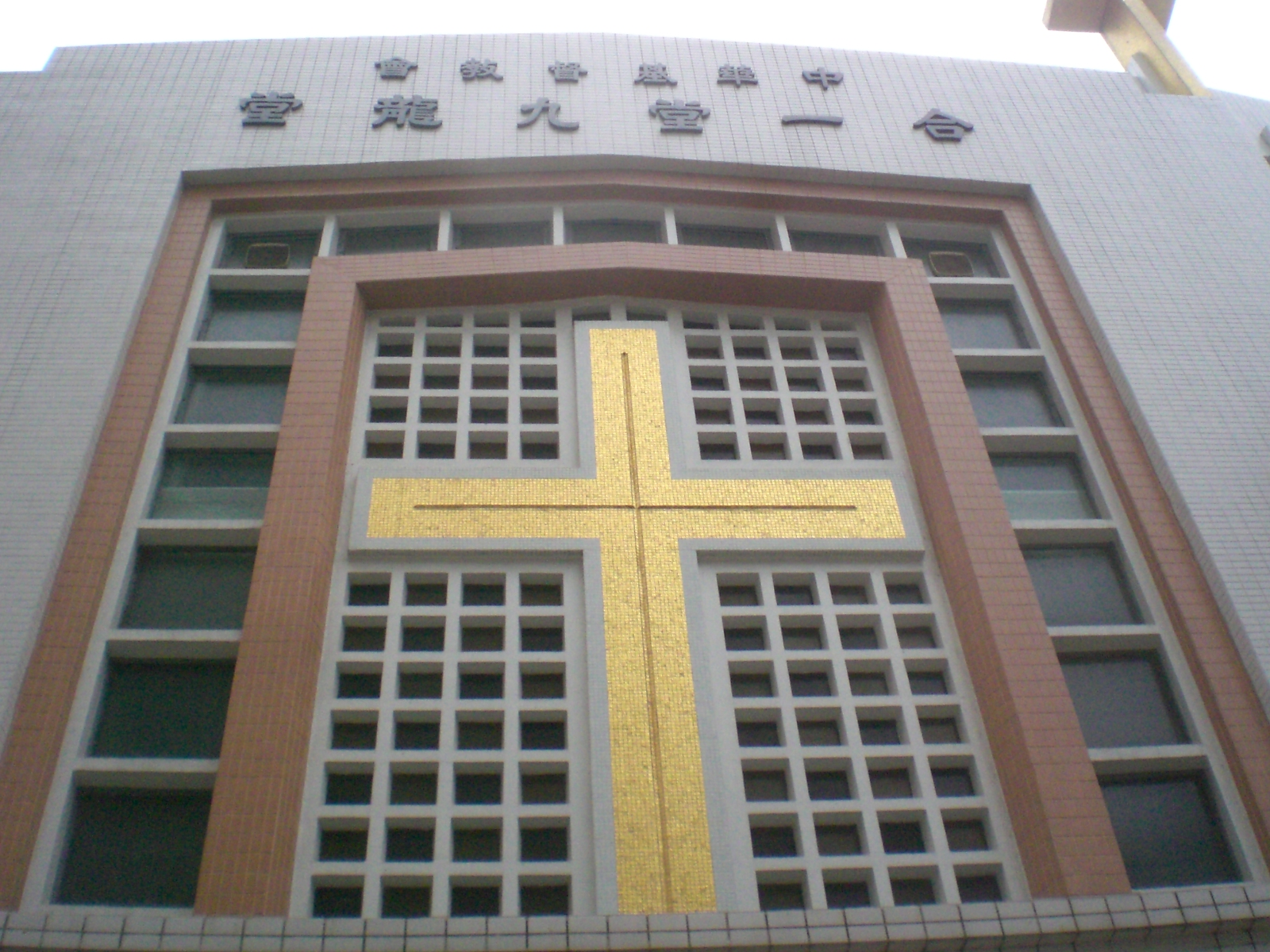
Hop Yat Church Kowloon

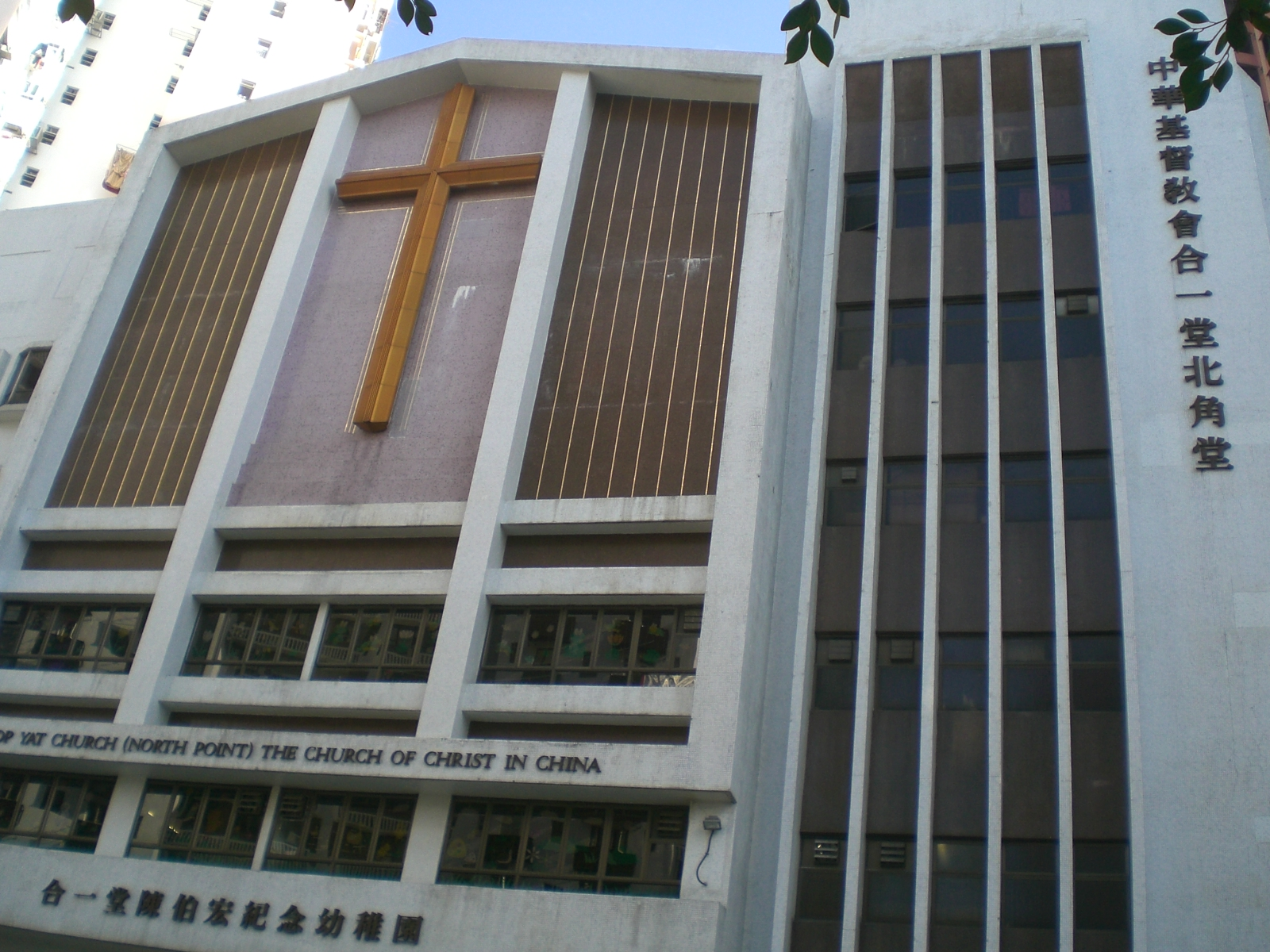
Hop Yat Church North Point

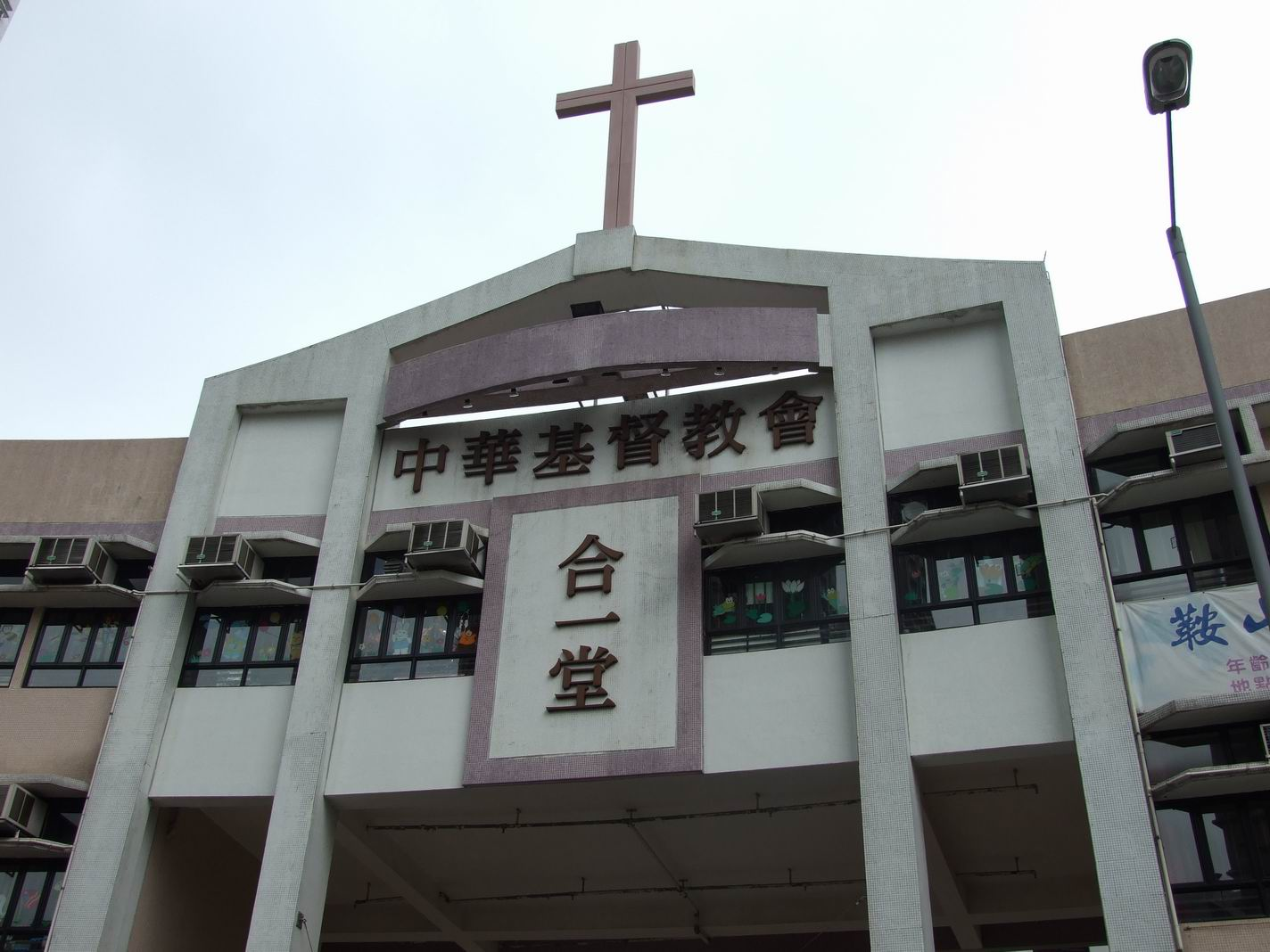
Hop Yat Church Ma On Shan

== Main church ==
The main church (the Hong Kong Church) is located at 2 Bonham Road, Mid-Levels, Hong Kong Island. Built in 1926 as the oldest of the Hop Yat family, it is now designated as a Grade I historic building in Hong Kong. It was also the first church built and funded by the local Christian churches in Hong Kong. In recent years, the main activities have been missionary work, adult and elderly education, apprenticeship programs, and single-parent care, etc.

== Kowloon Church ==
The Hop Yat Church Kowloon Church is located in Ho Man Tin, Kowloon. It has the following departments: Propaganda, Women's Affairs, Sunday School, Youth, Sacred Music, Fellowship, Charity, Finance, General Affairs, and Missions.

== Ma on Shan Church ==
The Church is located in Ma On Shan, New Territories. There are 5 departments: Worship and Devotional Department, Fellowship and Care Department, Believer Department, Evangelism and Outreach Department, Church Administration Department.

== North Point Church ==
The North Point Branch is located on Cloud View Road, North Point, Hong Kong Island, and is the third church built by Hop Yat Church. It has five departments: Evangelistic Outreach, Believer Development, Membership Life, Praise and Spiritual Exercises, and Church Administration.

== Other affiliated units ==
They include

- Hop Yat Church School,
- Social Service Department of the Church of Christ in China – Hop Yat Church,
- Hop Yat Church Chan Pak Wang Memorial Day Nursery.

== See also ==
- Christianity in Hong Kong
- Hong Kong Council of the Church of Christ in China
- Church of Christ in China
