= Tokyo 2010 =

Tokyo 2010 Global Mission Consultation

The first of four global consultations celebrating the centennial of Edinburgh 1910, the Tokyo 2010 Global Mission Consultation brought together around 1,000 Christian mission leaders from 140 countries in May 2010. Another 1,000 attendees came to Tokyo 2010 as observers. The theme and watchword of the consultation was "Making disciples of every people in our generation." This watchword built on the previous two watchwords of Edinburgh 1910 and Edinburgh 1980, which were “the evangelization of the world in this generation” and “a church for every people by the year 2000.” The watchword of Tokyo 2010 thus took the “generation” time frame of Edinburgh 1910, and the social group emphasis of Edinburgh 1980, and added the discipling aspect of Matthew 28:19-20.

== Task Forces ==
Tokyo 2010 was organized into 18 task forces, covering such areas as research, training, crisis response, technology and mission, global discipleship assessment and global mission coordination. Each task force made assessments in three areas, relative to their particular focus: What is the current need and what is being done about it? What remains to be done? and How can mission agencies help to bridge the gap between present efforts and the projected need over the next ten years?

== Finishing the Task ==
A special listing called the Finishing the Task List was distributed at Tokyo 2010, which documented the existence of 632 unreached peoples over 50,000 in population without any long-term missionary engagement. Specific commitments were made by agency representatives at Tokyo 2010 to engage 171 of these in the next three years with missionary work. Delegates also signed up to send out 1,244 oral Bible teams, which will dub Bible stories for priority language groups which have a high percentage of oral-learners. Eighty-five mission agencies also volunteered to help with national surveys to identify communities without access to a local church.

== Historical significance ==
Special emphasis was given at Tokyo 2010 to the growth of the non-Western missions movement. At Edinburgh 1910 there was no representation from non-Western mission agencies. At Edinburgh 1980, roughly 30 percent of the delegates were from the non-Western world. At Tokyo 2010, over 65% of the delegates were from non-Western mission agencies.

== See also ==
- Timeline of Christian missions
- 1910 World Missionary Conference
