= Andrew P. Happer =

Presbyterian missionary in South China (b. 1818, d. 1894)

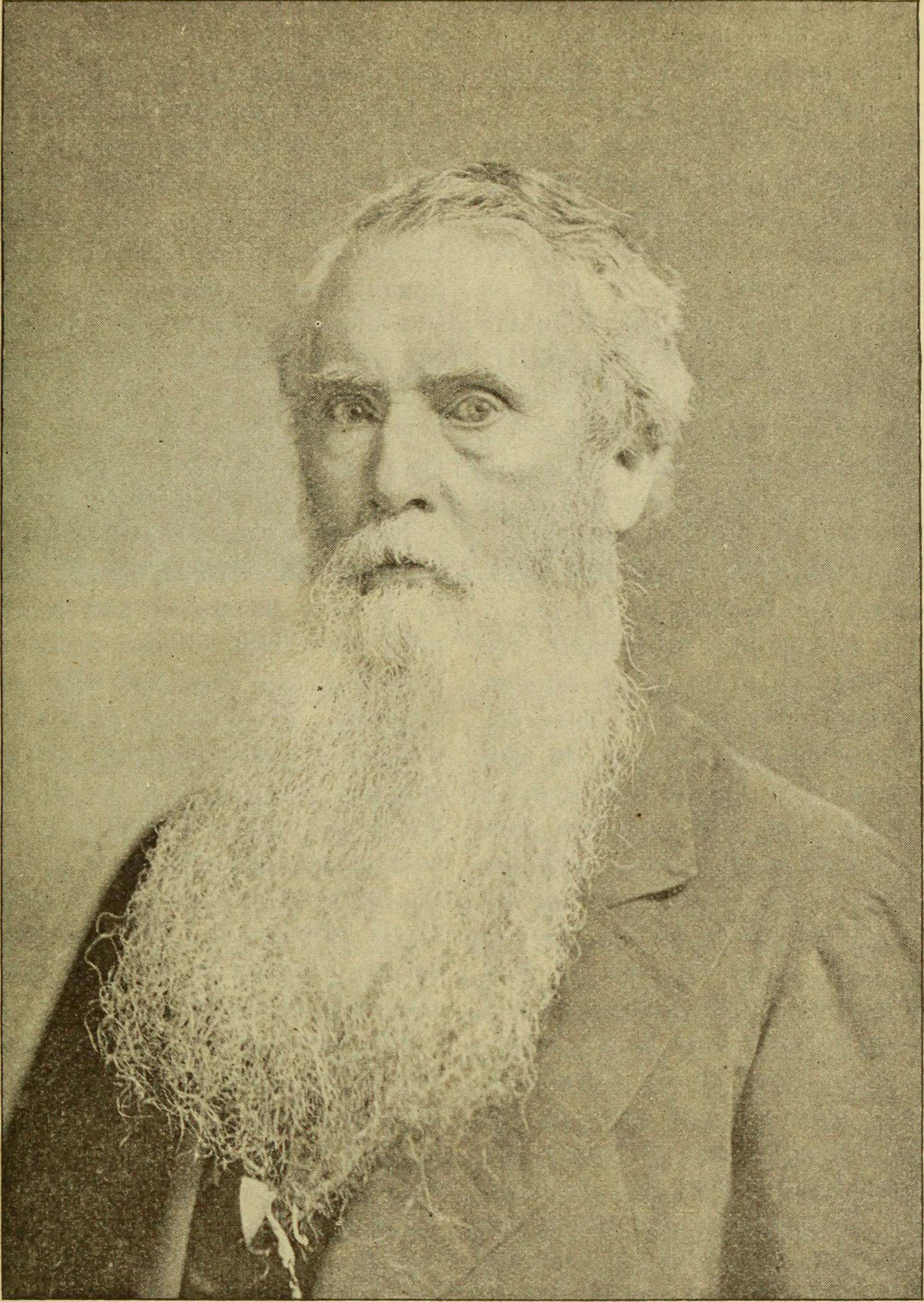
- Born: 1818
- Died: 1894 (aged 75–76)
- Citizenship: United States
- Scientific career
- Fields: Christian Missionary, Medical Missionary, Educator

Andrew P. Happer (1818–1894) was a nineteenth-century American Presbyterian missionary who is known for his educational, medical, and religious endeavours in South China. Happer's missionary service lasted from 1844 to 1891, and during this time he worked in the suburbs and city of Canton. In the field of medicine, Happer created two dispensaries, the first was established in 1847 and the second in 1854. He also introduced higher Christian education to the Chinese youth of Canton through opening boarding and day schools, a training school, and eventually the Canton Christian College in the year 1888. Carrying out his duty as a Presbyterian missionary, Happer found the First Presbyterian Church where he was a pastor and converted many Cantonese people to Christianity, published books and other works focusing on Presbyterian faith, translated multiple religious works, and held editor positions for Presbyterian periodicals. After making his impact on the Cantonese people and laying down the foundation for future Presbyterian missions in South China, Happer left China for the last time in 1894.

== Background and education ==
Born on October 20, 1818, in Monongahela, Pennsylvania, to two Christian Presbyterian parents, Andrew P. Happer is one of the most renowned missionaries who carried out his work in China, most notably the city of Canton. His mother, Ann Harper, had the most impact on his future career choice as she directed him towards Christian missionary work through placing him in the preparatory department of Jefferson College in Pennsylvania at age 11.

=== Marriages ===
Happer married Elizabeth Ball on 11 November 1847. Ball was part of the American Board of Commissioners for Foreign Missions. In December 1864, his wife Elizabeth died, leaving Happer as a single father of five (other?) children whom he sent back home to Pennsylvania. In July 1867, Happer returned to America and married Miss A.L. Elliot two years later. Tragedy struck when his second wife died on October 10, 1873. A few years later, he married his third wife, Hannah J. Shaw, another Presbyterian missionary in Canton, on March 18, 1875.

In 1853, Happer and Elizabeth's daughter Lillie Ball Happer was born in Macao, and after the family moved to Canton she worked in the mission girls'school until she married Theodore Bliss Cunningham in December 1879. She died after childbirth in December 1886, leaving an infant daughter: Lillie Happer Cunningham. His daughter Lucile Lucy married George Bunker Glover. His daughter Mary Rebecca married Francis Williams Damon, son of Samuel Chenery Damon. His daughter Alverda Catherine married George Dixon Fearon, the nephew of James Sturgis Fearon and Samuel Turner Fearon.

=== Education ===
After graduating from Jefferson College in 1835, Happer entered the Western Theological Seminary in Pittsburgh in 1840. Upon graduation in 1843 from the seminary, he had been licensed by the Presbytery of Ohio. Happer was admitted in medical school at the University of Pennsylvania in Philadelphia. Upon receiving his M.D., he had been ordained to the Presbyterian ministry on April 23, 1844. Originally he had wanted to travel to India to do missionary work, however after the Opium War and China's opening to the West, he decided he could start his career there.

== Missionary Service (1844-1891) ==
Happer co-founded one of the first Protestant missions in China through the American Presbyterian Church. The Presbyterian mission was one of the first four American mission agencies in China to carry out missionary work there. The multiple projects and institutions constructed by Happer throughout his forty-seven year career as a missionary represents the evolution of Presbyterian missionary work in China throughout the nineteenth century. He, John G. Kerr (medical administration), and WAP Martin (language) are considered the pioneering Presbyterian missionaries in China.

=== First trip to China (1844–1847), medical missionary work ===
Upon Happer's arrival in Macau on October 23, 1844, the Opium War had previously blocked most forms of western and missionary influence in China. Ability to travel throughout China had been very restricted for foreigners. Although access to Canton was still officially restricted, Happer reached the people through the provision of medical aid and preaching the gospel. Following the Opium War, the Treaty of Nanking opened five ports for foreign trade. As a result, China became open to missionaries. As one of only 31 Protestant missionaries (3 of them Presbyterian, Happer faced numerous challenges and difficulties. Few resources were available, with China as an intimidating location. Foreigners were not allowed to live in Canton so Happer moved to Hong Kong and worked and later led at the Morrison Education Society.

Happer returned to Macau in 1845 and opened a boy's boarding school with twenty-seven enrolled students. Although the Opium War treaties had declared that foreigners could access Canton, the Chinese officials refused to let Happer enter the city. He had to move the school to a suburb of Canton.

After realizing the responsiveness of the Cantonese people towards education and medicine, Happer opened his first dispensary in 1847. Happer carried out Christian evangelism through the dispensary in various ways, including preaching to his patients and holding chapel services for community residents. Overall, the dispensary treated seven thousand patients annually. This number rose to ten thousand in 1854 after the opening of a secondary dispensary. Management of these dispensaries was handed over to John Glasgow Kerr that same year. Kerr eventually opened the Canton Hospital that served a great portion of people from South China. After transferring the responsibility of the dispensaries to Kerr, Happer focused more on providing a Christian-focused western education to Chinese youth.

=== Second trip to China - Focus on a Education and mission expansion (1859-1869) ===
During his second mission, Happer focused on education and evangelism. He was passionate about converting Chinese individuals to Christianity and converting society through providing education. In 1850, he opened a set of day schools to educate young Chinese boys in both western and Chinese studies. The schools faced difficulty attracting youth from the upper class who were enrolled in traditional schools that prepared students for the civil service examinations. By December 1853, Happer opened a day school for Chinese girls which offered courses in reading, writing, and economics. By the end of 1853, the first eleven students graduated from the boy's boarding school with two students devoting themselves to the Canton mission.

Happer went on medical furlough in 1855 and the Second Anglo-Chinese War delayed the Happer's return from furlough until 1859. Following the war, however, the treaties produced by the war promoted free and unrestricted access to Canton. This led to an upsurge of missionaries into the Canton with increased conversions to Christianity. In the 1860s, Happer founded the First Presbyterian Church, numerous boarding and day schools, and a training school serving preachers, teachers, and colporteurs of Canton. Happer served as pastor of the First Presbyterian Church in Canton, established in 1862. Through establishing multiple forms of educational services, Happer accomplished his mission of bringing Christian higher education to China, though much of the student body of the training school included those working for the church. In order to reach governmental Chinese leaders through western education, from 1865 and 1867, Happer directed the Chinese government's Interpreter's College in Canton and taught English and mathematics to students entering government services as foreign specialists. By introducing Christian teachings within his courses, he continued his mission of evangelism and observed the gradual growth of Canton Presbyterians. This is supported by the statistics reported from the Canton Mission that in 1866: 147 individuals were enrolled in mission schools.

=== Final trip to China - Expanding Education and Religious Outreach (1870-1891) ===
After a 1867 furlough to the US and marriage to his second wife, and revitalized by newfound love and the increasing presence of western influence in China, Happer returned to China in 1870. This missionary period was marked by a change in his missionary career from mission-centric to program-focused. Specifically, this included the local development of “evangelistic, education, and medical programs.”. In his evangelistic efforts, Happer continued being a pastor of the First Church, built a new sanctuary, attracted more upper-class citizens to the church, opened two new churches, and increased overall church membership.

== Contribution to Presbyterian literature ==
Happer took great interest in writing about “theology and practice among Chinese converts” along with translating various portions of the Bible. From 1880 to 1884, he had been the editor of the most popular western language periodical in China, the Chinese Recorder and Missionary Journal. Through this position, he was able to publish various books, pamphlets, and forums about the Presbyterian faith and practice in the Chinese church. Under his direction, some religious books had been translated into Cantonese. One of his most esteemed projects had been serving on a China-wide committee of missionaries to design a Cantonese version of the New Testament. Along with the journal, Happer also held a position as Chairman of the Editorial Committee for the Presbyterian Press at Shanghai.

== Canton Christian College ==
Happer was encouraged by the Canton Mission to narrow the purpose of the boy's training school. He, therefore, decided to pursue his greater vision of opening a non-denominational institution, the Canton Christian College in 1888. In order to integrate Presbyterian values within the college, the institution had Presbyterian faculty and supporters. While the Board of Trustees would govern the college from the United States, the Board of Directors consisted of mainly Presbyterians in China. Happer became the first president of Canton Christian College which offered various courses in both liberal arts and pre-professional fields, including medicine and science.

As in the case with the boys training school and his own college, Happer had always desired to expand the education of the students to prepare them for all types of careers, not only Christian workers. To ensure that students would acquire advanced knowledge in technology and modern science, Happer ensured that teaching would be in English. As a devout believer in higher education, Happer constantly made decisions reflecting his desire to train his students to one day leading the economic and social advancement of China. Before completing his missionary work, Happer taught classes at the college in Canton. Although Happer left China with his wife for the last time in 1891, his impact would forever remain and lead to the rapid growth and development of missionary work opening China to the west.

== Legacy ==
While residing in the United States, Happer was able to celebrate the 50th anniversary of his ordination to the work of the Foreign Missions as an evangelist by the Presbytery. He had also been ordained as an evangelist in the Presbyterian Church in Monongahela City. On Saturday, October 27, 1894, in his own home in Wooster, Ohio, Happer died at seventy-six years and seven days old.

Over the years, the Christian Canton College has undergone various name and location changes. In 1952 the college was incorporated into Chung Shan University (now Sun Yat-sen University). As a result of the communist occupation by the Japanese in Canton, some of the Canton Christian College faculty fled to Hong Kong and developed the Lingnan School offering diploma programs in liberal arts, commerce, and social science. Registered as an Approved Post-Secondary College, the university changed its name to Lingnan College at the end of 1978. The college received full recognition as a university by the Hong Kong's government in 1998. On July 30, 1999, the institution's name was changed to Lingnan University, becoming the sole public liberal arts university in Hong Kong. At the time, Lingnan University was declared the leading Christian institution for higher education in South China. Happer's legacy contributed to the history of the two continuing universities in mainland China and in Hong Kong.

Happer laid the foundation for future missionary work in South China to flourish. His legacyis known for igniting the missionary and English language educational movement in China and the youth that he described as “certainly full of promise for the future.”. While his accomplishments are significant and lasting, he himself admitted that it was not an easy journey saying, “My missionary life was in a new and most difficult field.”.

Within a journal article written by Happer in 1872, was his hope for the future of China, the Chinese youth, and the spread of the Christian Gospel message. He discussed introducing new programs that would allow some Chinese youth to study in the United States for a period of time in the hopes that they too could receive a proper Western education and assume the roles of missionaries. This reflects his passion for enhancing the prosperity of the Chinese society through educating the youth to lead the future of the country. Happer also wrote about the work being accomplished to advance the educational movement in China and its promising future. Referring to the work of various missionaries, including himself, towards introducing Western education to Chinese youth, Happer describes China as such:

“Now, since China has taken her place among the nations of the earth, she greatly needs men of her own country, with a thorough education in Western language and science, to carry on the international intercourse that this now position requires of her.”.

Being a multi-faceted missionary, Happer focused on the advancement of education, health, and Christianity throughout Canton. His religious foundation is described in the future of China as:

“A brighter day is in prospect for China, and the only hope of her regeneration is in the gospel of Christ.”.
