= Hong Kong Council of the Church of Christ in China =

Protestant church in Hong Kong

- Traditional Chinese: 中華基督教會香港區會
- Simplified Chinese: 中华基督教会香港区会
Transcriptions
Standard Mandarin
- Hanyu Pinyin: Zhōnghuá Jīdūjiào Huì Xiānggǎng Qū Huì
Yue: Cantonese
- Jyutping: zung1 waa4 gei1 duk1 gaau3 wui6*2 hoeng1 gong2 keoi1 wui6*2

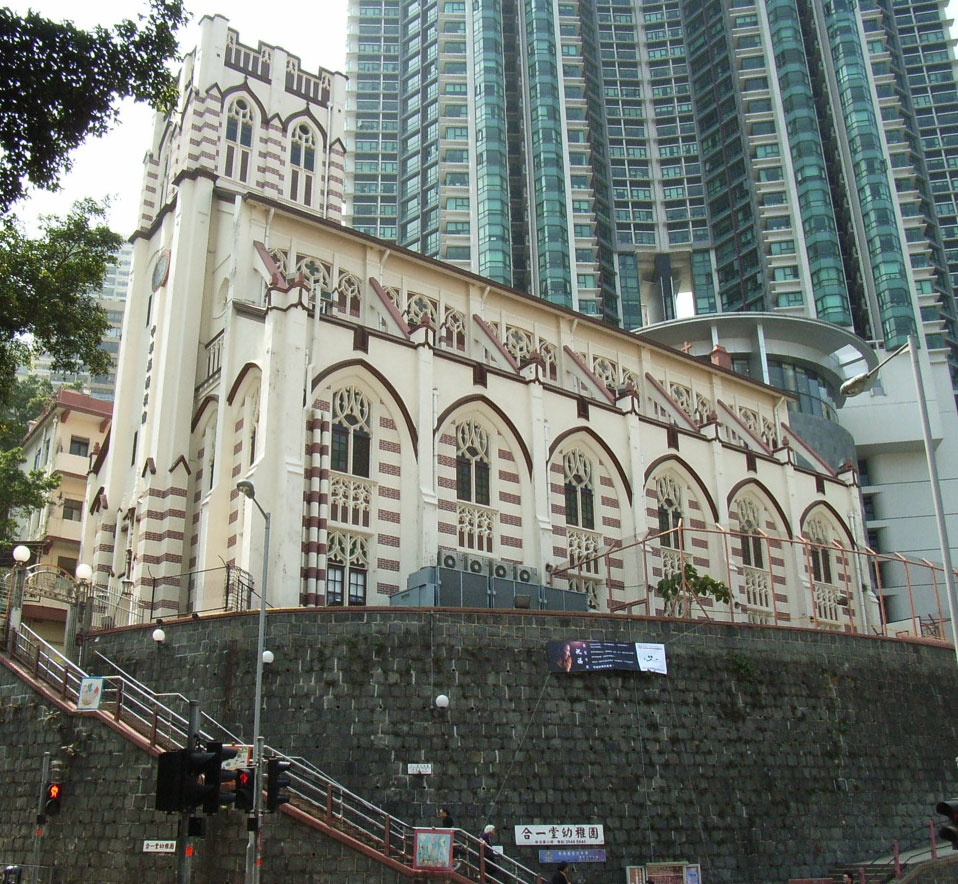
One of the churches, Hop Yat Church, at 2 Bonham Road, Sheung Wan

The Hong Kong Council of the Church of Christ in China (Abbr: HKCCCC, Chinese: 中華基督教會香港區會) is a Protestant Christian church organization in Hong Kong. Its history can be traced back to the formation of the Church of Christ in China, which is a uniting church consisting mainly of churches with Congregational and Presbyterian traditions (reformed traditions), including the London Missionary Society, British Baptist Missionary Society and others.

Initially established as the Sixth District Association of the Guangdong Synod of the Church of Christ in China (中華基督教會廣東協會第六區會), the Hong Kong Council was reorganized from its predecessor in 1953 after the Chinese Communist Party took over mainland China, since the connection with the Guangdong Synod could not be maintained due to the political situation.

The construction of their first church building, Hop Yat Church, was completed on 10 October 1926. It is located at 2 Bonham Road in the Mid-Levels area in the city.

HKCCCC is one of the sponsoring bodies in Hong Kong that runs many local schools including the CCC Kei Wan Primary School (Aldrich Bay).

== See also ==
- Church of Christ in China
- Christianity in Hong Kong
