= Honolulu Sailor's Home =

Sailor's home in Honolulu, US

Coordinates: 21°18′23″N 157°51′45″W

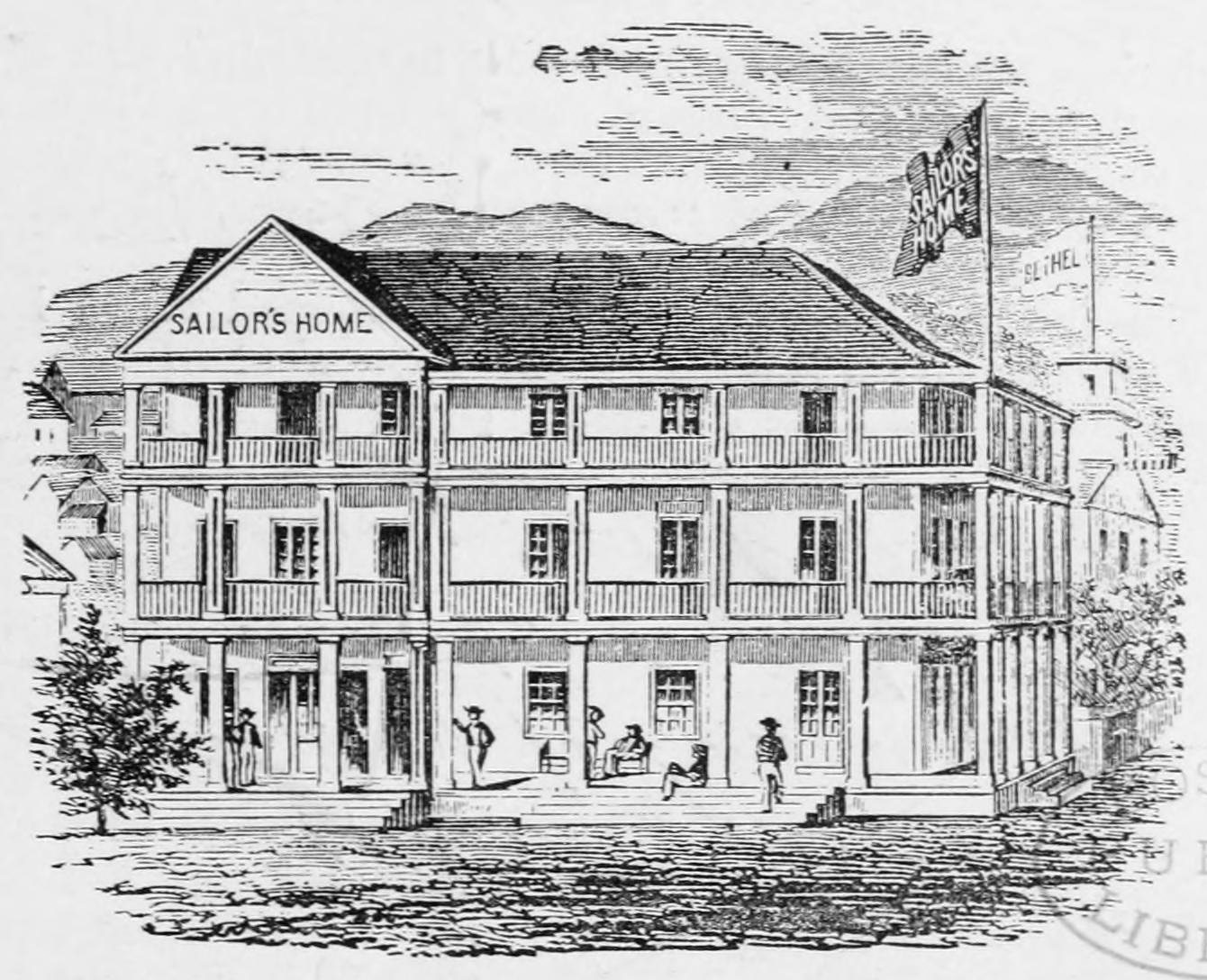
Sketch of original 1855 building

The Honolulu Sailor's Home is a non-profit lodge for international merchant seamen. The home was incorporated in May 1855 with a lot obtained by a grant from the Kingdom of Hawaii. Originally located on Cat Bethel Street adjacent to the Port of Honolulu, it is now located one block away at 707 Alakea Street

== History ==
The original grant included a clause "that no intoxicating liquors shall be drank on the premises", and "no women of lewd character admitted". Hawaiian King Kamehameha IV laid the cornerstone for the home with "appropriate ceremonies" on Restoration Day, July 31, 1855. In October of that year, the Reading Room was opened for public use. On September 11, 1856, the home was officially opened as lodging for merchant seaman. The chairman of the Executive Committee was Rev. Samuel C. Damon, who published a newspaper called the Friend in the building.

Sailors who died on the island without family were buried in the Oahu Cemetery, in a plot purchased for that purpose.
