= Francis Lister Hawks Pott =

American Episcopal missionary and educator in China

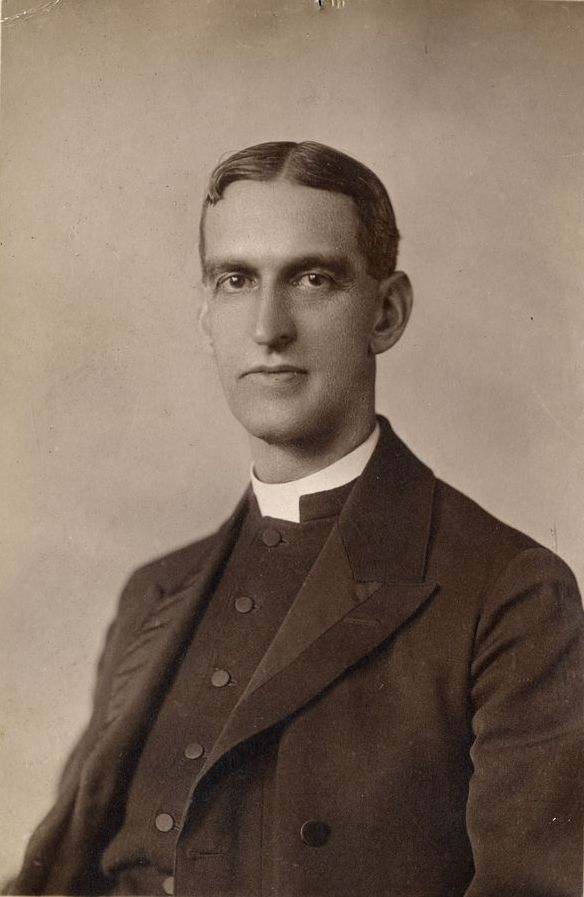
- Traditional Chinese: 卜舫濟
- Simplified Chinese: 卜舫济
Transcriptions
Standard Mandarin
- Hanyu Pinyin: Bǔ Fǎngjì
- Wade–Giles: Pu Fang-chi
- IPA: [pʰù fàŋtɕî]
Wu
- Romanization: poʔ³fɑ̃⁴⁴tɕi²¹

Francis Lister Hawks Pott (Chinese: 卜舫濟; February 22, 1864 – March 7, 1947) was an American Episcopal missionary and educator in China. He served as President of St. John's College (later renamed St. John's University), one of China's oldest and most prestigious universities, from 1888 until 1941. With the outbreak of the Pacific War in 1941 and the Japanese occupation of the Shanghai International Settlement, he left for the United States. After World War II, he returned to Shanghai.

Pott was married to Soo Ngoo Wong (Chinese: 黃素娥; pinyin: Huáng Sù'é), who died in 1918. Their children were James Hawks Pott, William Sumner Appleton Hawks Pott, Olivia Hawks Pott, and Walter Graham Hawks Pott.

In 1919 in Shanghai, he married Emily Georgiana née Browne, the widow of his St. John’s colleague Frederick Clement Cooper and mother of Gwendolin and Mervyn Cooper.

Pott was educated at the Trinity School, received a bachelor's degree from Columbia College of Columbia University in 1883, and a degree in divinity General Theological Seminary in 1886.

== See also ==
- Christianity in China

== Bibliography ==
- "Pott, F. L. Hawks (Francis Lister Hawks), 1864-1947". The Online Books Page.
- Sketch of Chinese history [microform]
- Francis Lister Hawks Pott (1907). Lessons in the Shanghai dialect. Shanghai: Printed at the American Presbyterian mission press.
- Francis Lister Hawks Pott; Frank Joseph Rawlinson (1915). 滬語開路 = Conversational exercises in the Shanghai dialect / Hu yu kai lu = Conversational exercises in the Shanghai dialect. Conversational exercises in the Shanghai dialect. Shanghai: Shanghai mei hua shu guan.
- Francis Lister Hawks Pott (1924). Lessons in the Shanghai dialect. Commercial Press.
- The Outbreak in China: Its Causes. (New York: James Pott and Co., 1900)
- A Sketch of Chinese History (New York: Domestic and Foreign Missionary Society, 1913)
- The Emergency in China (New York: Missionary Education Movement of the United States and Canada, 1913)
- A Short History of Shanghai: Being an Account of the Growth and Development of the International Settlement (Kelly and Walsh, Limited, 1928)
