= Chinese Recorder and Missionary Journal =

Publication of Western Christian missionaries in pre-WWII Chinas

Chinese Recorder and Missionary Journal

Chinese Recorder and Missionary Journal was a journal, pamphlet or magazine published in one or another form in Shanghai from 1867 to 1941, after which it was closed by Japanese authorities. The Journal was the leading outlet for the English language missionary community in China, with a number of Chinese readers as well. In the 1920s and 1930s, under the editorship of Frank J. Rawlinson, it was known for its liberal theology and support for Chinese nationalism.

== History ==
The Methodist Press in Fuzhou first published a journal called The Missionary Recorder: A Repository of Intelligence from Eastern Missions, and Medium of General Information in 1867, shortly after it became legal for foreigners to live in China and for missionaries to proselytize there. This journal was short-lived, however, lasting only a year. The Methodist Press followed it with the Chinese Recorder and Missionary Journal in 1868. Justus Doolittle, a missionary of the American Board of Commissioners for Foreign Missions, joined the Rev. Stephen Livingstone Baldwin of the American Methodist Episcopal Mission in the editorship, but this journal stopped publication in May 1872 after the publication of Volume 4.

The Presbyterian Press in Shanghai took up bi-monthly publication in January 1874, initiating a sixty-seven year run, becoming monthly in 1886. Alexander Wylie, Agent of the British and Foreign Bible Society, served as editor from 1874 until 1877, upon which Baldwin resumed his helm as editor until 1879. The Rev. Andrew P. Happer assumed the role from 1880 until the decline of his health in 1884. The Rev. Dr. Luther Halsey Gulick Sr. succeeded Happer as editor from 1885 until his own retirement due to health issues in 1889.

Rev. Lucius Nathan Wheeler, who first started the journal under its original name in 1867, served as editor from 1891 until his sudden death in 1893. Rev. G.F. Fitch became editor in 1908 and was joined in April 1911 by the Rev. Nelson Bitton in April 1911 (who served only briefly).

In January 1912 the Rev. Frank J. Rawlinson became first associate editor, then editor in 1913. In the late 1910s, Rawlinson became so involved with theologically liberal causes and support of Chinese nationalism that he was forced to resign from his mission; instead, he joined the more liberal American Board of Commissioners for Foreign Missions. During the 1920s The Chinese Recorder welcomed a wide range of views but was particularly known for its commentaries and translations of Chinese writings. Rawlinson continued until September 1937, when he was killed by a bomb dropped accidentally by a Chinese plane during the Japanese attack on Shanghai.

By 1939 the journal became known as The Chinese Recorder and Educational Review, but ceased publication in December 1941.

== Availability ==
A complete run is for sale by National Taiwan University Press, including the Index by Kathleen Lodwick. A subscription-based version is also made available through the HathiTrust.

As many of the volumes are now out of copyright, a listing of the volumes 1-45 (1868–1914) has been digitized and made available online through the Internet Archive and the Berlin State Library. Lodwick's two-volume index to the entire run includes names, places, and topics.
