= Justus Doolittle =

American Board missionary

Justus Doolittle (simplified Chinese: 卢公明; traditional Chinese: 盧公明; Pinyin: Lú Gōngmíng; Foochow Romanized: Lù Gŭng-mìng; June 23, 1824, Rutland, New York – June 15, 1880, Clinton, New York) was an American Board missionary to China.

== Life ==
Justus Doolittle was born in Rutland, New York on June 23, 1824. In 1846 he graduated from Hamilton College, and in 1849 from Auburn Theological Seminary. Having deliberately chosen China as his field of labor, he sailed for Fuzhou with his soon after graduation, and arrived there in 1850. In February, 1864, he left China for a visit to the United States on account of his health. In 1872 he entered the service of the Presbyterian Board at Shanghai, but was soon compelled to return home disabled. On June 15, 1880, he died in Clinton, New York.

Doolittle was most famous for his Social Life of the Chinese, a thorough and valuable work on the details of Chinese life. He also had a significant collection of Chinese coins, which was sold in June 1881.

In 1870-71 he accompanied the photographer John Thomson. Thomson's photographs of this journey were published as Foochow and the River Min (1873), a total of 46 copies.

Doolittle kept a journal, "Diary; covering his life as a foreign missionary in Foochow, China, until the year 1873", now in the Hamilton College Archives and available in Hamilton College's Digital Collections.

== Publications ==
Doolittle published prolifically in a wide range of journals, including Chinese Recorder and Missionary Journal, of which he was briefly an editor.

=== Fuzhou dialect ===
Book title	Foochow Romanized	English title	Year
勸戒鴉片論	Kuóng Gái Ă-piéng Lâung	Exhortation to Abandon Opium	1853
鄉訓	Hiŏng Hóng	Village Sermons	1853
神十誡其註釋	Sìng Sĕk-gái gì Cuó-sék	Commentary on the Ten Commandments	1853
悔罪信耶穌論	Huói Cô̤i Séng Ià-sŭ Lâung	Repentance and Faith	1854
天文問答	Tiĕng-ùng Ông-dák	Catechism of Astronomy	1854
約翰福音	Iók-hâng Hók-ĭng	John's Gospel	1854
媽祖婆論	Mā-cū-bò̤ Lâung	Discourse on Ma-tsoo-po	1855
守禮拜日論	Siū Lā̤-bái-nĭk Lâung	Discourse on Keeping the Sabbath	1855
天律明説	Tiĕng Lŭk Mìng Suók	Exposition of the Decalogue	1855
寒食清明論	Hàng-sĭk Chĭng-mìng Lâung	Discourse on the Feast of the Tombs	1855
鐘錶匠論	Cṳ̆ng-biēu-chióng Lâung	Story of a Watchmaker	1855
賭博明論	Dū-báuk Mìng Lâung	Discourse on Gambling	1856
中外問答	Dṳ̆ng Nguôi Ông-dák	Dialogue between a Native and a Foreigner	1856
耶穌教小引	Ià-sŭ-gáu Siēu-īng	Introduction to Christianity	1856
生意人事廣益法	Sĕng-é Ìng-sê̤ṳ Guōng-iáh Huák	Laws of Trade	1857
西洋中華通書	Să̤-iòng Dṳ̆ng-huà Tŭng-cṳ̆	European Chinese Almanac	1857
辯鬼神論	Biêng Gūi-sìng Lâung	Disquisition on Heathen Gods	1858
辯性論	Biêng Séng Lâung	Disquisition on Human Nature	1858
辯譭謗	Biêng Hūi-báung	Disquisition on Slander	1858
華人貧窶之故	Huà-ìng Bìng-lé̤ṳ cĭ Gó	Causes of Poverty among the Chinese	1858
祈禱式文	Gì-dō̤ Sék-ùng	Forms of Prayer	1858
棄主臨死畏刑 信主臨死慰樂	Ké Cuō Lìng Sṳ̄ Ói Hìng; Séng Cuō Lìng Sṳ̄ Ói Lŏk	Fear of the Wicked on the Approach of Death; Joy of the Believer on the Approach of Death	1858
辯孝論	Biêng Háu Lâung	Disquisition on Filial Piety	1858
異端辯論	Discussion of False Doctrines	1858	

=== English ===
Book title	Year	Information
Social Life of the Chinese (2 vols.)	1865	This consists chiefly of the republication of a long series of articles by Doolittle, containing a vast amount of original information, on subjects connected with China, most of which were published in the China Mail, under the title "Jottings on the Chinese."
A Vocabulary and Hand-book of the Chinese Language	1872	Romanized in Mandarin Chinese

== Works ==
- Doolittle, Justus (1872). Vocabulary and hand-book of the Chinese language: Romanized in the Mandarin dialect, Volume 1. Foochow: Rozario, Marcal and company. Archived from the original on May 15, 2014.
- Doolittle, Justus (1872). Vocabulary and hand-book of the Chinese language . . . romanized in the Mandarin dialect, Volume 2. Foochow: Rozario, Marcal and company.
- Doolittle, Justus (1872). *Ying Hua Cui Lin Yun Fu: 1: Part 1. Rozario, Marcal & Company.
- Doolittle, Justus (1872). *Ying Hua Cui Lin Yun Fu: 2: Parts 2. and 3. 1. Foochow: Rozario, Marcal & Company.
- Doolittle, Justus (1866). Social life of the Chinese: with some account of their religious, governmental, educational, and business customs and opinions. With special but not exclusive reference to Fuchchau. New York: Harper.
