= Anti-Christian Movement =

1920s Chinese political movement

The Anti-Christian Movement (Chinese: 非基督教運動) was an intellectual and political anti-religious movement in China in the 1920s. The movement was born out of the anti-imperialistic and anti-Western sentiments that were heightened in the May Fourth Movement and strengthened by the strong desire for national unity in the 1920s. Under strong nationalistic feelings, Christianity was viewed as the vehicle and product of foreign imperialism, and that Western-operated churches and mission works were a way to shape the development of China for the benefit of Western imperialists. The movement aimed to challenge the presence of Christianity as a means to build a Chinese nation without foreign interferences.

The Anti-Christian Movement was also a result of ideological development in China. The May Fourth Movement brought in modern Western ideologies as possible ideological framework for the modernization of China, and some of them were critical of religions, such as Marxism, rationalism, and socialism. These skeptical views against religion had entered into the intellectual debate for Chinese modernization, which led to the thinking that the Christian faith was a superstition and it was imposed upon the Chinese people by Western imperialists.

The various movements were also inspired by modernizing attitudes deriving from both nationalist and socialist ideologies, as well as feeding on older anti-Christian sentiment that was in large part due to repeated invasions of China by Western countries. The Chinese nationalists had also sought unity in their country as well as a transformation in the way that their society operated, which seemed to heavily rely upon Western thought and/or ideals. They brought forth age-old criticisms about the Western religion and accused the Christian missionaries of actively participating in it as a way of eliminating the native culture of China like other foreign imperialists.

== Origins ==
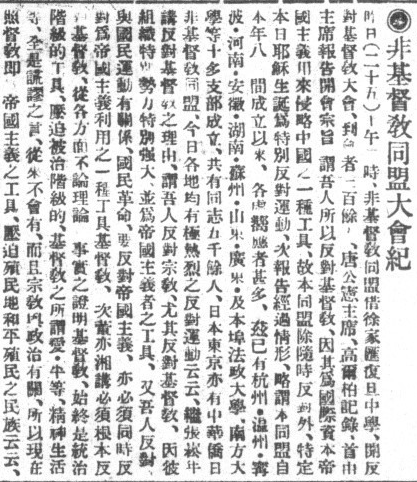
Chronicle of the General assembly on the Non-Christ Christ church

The most influential publication behind the movement was an article by Zhu Zhixin, a colleague of Sun Yat-sen, entitled What Is Jesus?, first published in 1919 and much republished thereafter. Zhu argued that Jesus was an ordinary illegitimate peasant child who became the leader of a band of mystical enthusiasts (with bandit elements) such as were often found in Chinese history.

One precipitating factor was the publication in 1922 of The Christian Occupation of China, a large-scale study of China's Protestant Christian churches and China's resources. Although the publication had been intended to prepare the way for turning Chinese churches over to Chinese Christians, the title seemed to show a different intent. A student movement was founded, garnering support at a number of universities, initially to oppose the planned meeting of the conference of the World Student Christian Federation in China, and more generally to counter-act the baleful influence of Christianity on China's attempts to modernize. Some other motives that were noted was to reclaim the lost infrastructure and temples that were given to the Christian missionaries and were transformed to become schools.

The May Fourth Movement included a trend towards intellectuals contending that religion was incompatible with modernity. Nationalist discourses in China during the 1920s became more anti-religious. Some Chinese criticised the connections between Christian missionaries and their home countries.

== Course ==
Protests related to the movement occurred from 1922 to 1927.

The killing of six Christian missionaries during the Nanking Incident of 1927 has been attributed to the influence of the movement, but can also be attributed to more generalized xenophobia.

In response to the attacks on Christian missionaries from various Chinese rebellions, the Churches sent out more missionaries to China in a "Faith Movement" to invigorate a call to faith for the Chinese. Despite the rejection and danger, many missionaries were also convinced that by the twentieth century, the "Second Coming of Christ" would occur and thus, they seemed desperate to save as many people as they could before it was too late.

Those that participated in persecuting the American Christians used fear tactics such as destroying the homes of the missionaries or kidnapping them and leaving them stranded somewhere in the wilderness, and caused multiple emotional breakdowns for many.

American Christians began to become furloughed from all the chaos and panic as well as some of the Church's loss of funds. Chinese Christians were left in charge of the institutions that were left behind but many were persecuted still because of the contradicting ideals of the natives and Christianity.

Protests associated with the movement criticised Protestant institutions as a tool of Western imperialism. The Kuomintang's 1926 National Congress in Canton endorsed the growing anti-Christian movement in China, labelling missionaries as "tongues and claws of imperialism." Protests and riots linked to the Nationalists frequently occurred, sometimes with Nationalist troops participating. Several mission properties were destroyed or looted. However, since the Kuomintang leaders, many being Christians themselves, held back from starting an actual conflict with the Christian churches, although they encouraged the propaganda against the churches. Hence, Chiang Kai-shek attempted to reassure missionaries they would not be targeted, although attacks against missions continued. Kuomintang members often possessed contradictory and mixed views. Many Kuomintang leaders, both leftists like Liao Zhongkai and rightists like Dai Jitao, Zou Lu, Wu Zhihui, strongly advocated for the anti-Christian movement, while some leftists like Zhou Enlai and Soviet advisor Borodin were friendly towards the missionaries. The Beijing government and the KMT government, like the communists, supported the Recovery of Education Rights Movement which condemned all missionary schools as imperialistic. The KMT government banned foreign school administration, imposed a standard national curriculum and abolished compulsory religious activities and studies. The Educational Rights movement became a key component of KMT ideology.

The movement effectively came to an end with Chiang Kai-shek's baptism in 1929 and the appointment of T. V. Soong, a Christian, as premier in 1930.

The anti-Christian Movement indeed drove many foreign missionaries out of China and strengthened Chinese Christians' movement for the indigenization of churches in their country.

== See also ==
- Boxer Rebellion
- Criticism of Christianity
- Jesuit missions in China
