= Cheng Jingyi =

Chinese Protestant Leader

Cheng Jingyi or Cheng Ching-yi (Chinese: 誠靜怡; 22 September 1881, Beijing – 15 November 1939, Shanghai) was a Chinese Protestant leader who worked for an independent, unified Chinese Christian Church and a nondenominational unity of Christians in China. He received honorary doctorates from Knox College, Toronto, Canada (1916); the College of Wooster, Ohio, USA (1923); and St. John's University, Shanghai (1929). He died in Shanghai after his visit to the mission work in southwest China and Guizhou in 1939.

== Biography ==
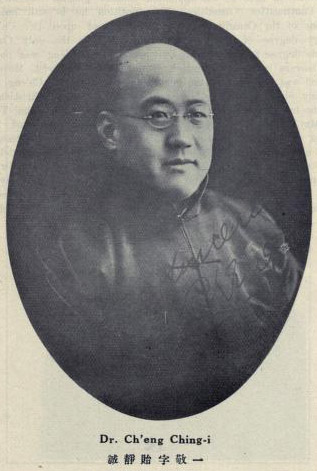
Cheng Jingyi 1923

Born to a Manchu pastor who had been converted to Christianity by a pastor of the London Missionary Society (LMS) in Beijing, Cheng was educated first at home in the Chinese classics, then attended the Anglo-Chinese Institute of the LMS, graduating in 1896. Less than a month before the outbreak of the Boxer Uprising Cheng finished four years of studies in theology in Tianjin, one of the hotspots of fighting during the Allied Intervention. Cheng volunteered as an interpreter and stretcher-bearer for the Allied forces.

Cheng used his training in Classical Chinese to help George Owen of the LMS revise his translation of the New Testament before continuing his theological training at the Bible Institute in Glasgow, Scotland. He returned to China after his graduation in 1908. After his ordination in his home church, he was pastor to a newly independent church, the Mishi Hutung Church in the East City of Beijing, which was attended by a number of Chinese academics and professionals.

The World Missionary Conference in Edinburgh in 1910 was a turning point in Cheng's career. The international mission movement had begun to recognize the need for "indigenization," that is, for developing native leadership. In an address that lasted only seven minutes, which one attendee called the best of the conference, Cheng called for a united Christian church with no denominational divisions and for missionaries to turn control over to national church leaders. Cheng's challenging words impressed John R. Mott, who had been pushing world leaders to give more importance to the "younger churches" and equal representation in their leadership. Mott had paid special attention to China, which he first visited in 1896. Cheng was the only Chinese member of the thirty-five member international Continuation Committee formed to carry out the Conference's mandates and was appointed secretary of the continuation committee of the National Missionary Conference in China, formed after John R. Mott's visit to China in 1913. Cheng, at that time not yet 30 years old, thus became an important member of what historian Daniel Bays calls the "Sino-Foreign Protestant Establishment," the mainstream missionary and Chinese church leadership.

In 1917, Cheng led a campaign against the movement to allow only Confucian teachings for moral instruction in the schools. Arguing that the future of the church in China lay in indigenous leadership, he helped form the indigenous interdenominational Chinese Home Mission Society to reach the ethnic groups in southwest China and, in 1919, helped launch the China for Christ Movement (Zhonghua Guizhu Yundong), with the help of David Z. T. Yui, the General Secretary of the Chinese National YMCA as chair. The latter movement spread to some dozen cities, calling "for Christian involvement in forming public opinion and conscience s well as in delivering a practical and social message," and aimed to promote China's nation building. It was merged into the longer standing China Continuation Committee. Cheng was general secretary of the National Christian Council from its establishment in 1922 until his resignation in 1933 because of poor health. In 1927, Cheng was elected the first moderator of the Church of Christ in China, a Protestant ecumenical organization comprising 16 denominations. He was on the executive committee of the International Missionary Council from 1928 to 1938.

He was one of the translators of the Christian Union Version of the Bible, along with Calvin Wilson Mateer, Frederick W. Baller and George Owen.

Cheng was deeply distressed by the Sino-Japanese War in 1937 because he was acquainted with many Japanese Christians and felt the war would do irreparable damage to Christian unity. Years of stress and constant travel weakened his health. He traveled to Southwest China to support mission work among tribal groups, and died on his return to Shanghai in 1940.

== Works ==
- World Missionary Conference, 1910 (1910). Report of Commission II: The Church in the Mission Field. Edinburgh: Oliphant, Anderson, and Ferrier. pp. 352–353.
- World Missionary Conference, 1910 (1910). Report of Commission VIII: Cooperation and the Promotion of Unity. Edinburgh: Oliphant, Anderson, and Ferrier. pp. 195–197.
- Cheng, Ching-Yi (July 1912). "The Chinese Church in Relation to Its Immediate Task". International Review of Missions. Vol. 1, no. 3. pp. 381–392. doi:10.1111/j.1758-6631.1912.tb00677.x.
- Cheng Jingyi (1912). Xin yue du fan [New Testament Studies]. Shanghai: Christian Literature Society.
