= 1888 London Centenary Missions Conference =

Christian missionary conference

The 1888 London Centenary Missions Conference was the first major international missionary conference. Spanning from June 9–19, the conference included delegates from 139 different Protestant denominations and societies representing ten countries. The conference was a precursor to the later, 1900 New York World Missionary Conference and the 1910 World Missionary Conference held in Edinburgh.

== The Conference ==
The conference was meant to commemorate a loose "centenary" of Anglo-American missions in the late 1780s. It was considered by some as an "Oecumenical Council" and, as such, the originals of the modern ecumenism. The term "ecumenical" would later be added to the title of the 1900 New York conference.

The conference was divided into three sections. The first section discussed the state of worldwide religions in relation to missionary efforts, including Islam, Buddhism, Catholicism, local missionary support, and commerce. Section two centered on the various mission fields as delegates highlighted India, China, Japan, Africa, Turkey, the Oceania, and the Americas. The third and final section focused on specific missionary subjects such as the Jews, and alternative missionary methods like medical missions and women's mission.

In addition to missions, prominent themes throughout the conference include imperialism and internationalism. Colonization allowed for western nations to more easily send missions across the globe, at times with the goal of strengthen their territorial holdings. This symbiotic relationship was challenged by attendees cognizant of imperialism's hindrance for missionary success. Internationalist perspectives emphasized Christianity unity across borders.

== Legacy ==
While the conference has been overshadowed by the 1900 New York Ecumenical Missionary Conference and the 1910 World Missionary Conference in Edinburgh, it was the first international missions conference, setting the precedent for future meetings. The conference exemplified the ecumenical movement in modern Protestantism, as well as the rise of the global mission movement. Occurring nineteen years after the First Vatican Council, conference organizers self-described the conference as a Protestant equivalent. The conference is also credited with increasing missionary awareness within the United States.
