= Samuel C. Damon =

American newspaper editor (1815–1885)

Samuel Chenery Damon
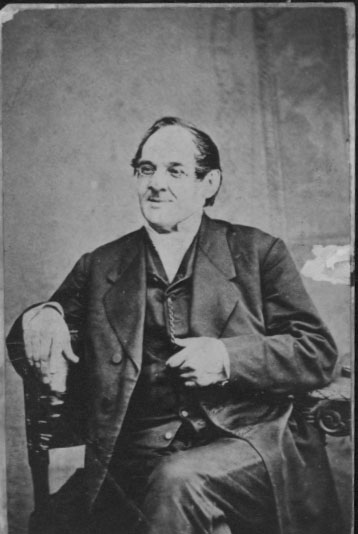
- Born: February 15, 1815; Holden, Massachusetts
- Died: February 7, 1885 (aged 69); Honolulu, Hawaii
- Spouse: Julia Sherman Mills
- Children: Samuel Mills Damon four others

Samuel Chenery Damon (February 15, 1815 – February 7, 1885) was a missionary to Hawaii, pastor of the Seamen's Bethel Church, chaplain of the Honolulu American Seamen's Friend Society and editor of the monthly newspaper The Friend.

He began his religious studies at Princeton Theological Seminary in 1838–39, and graduated from Andover Theological Seminary in 1841, after which he was ordained to the Congregational ministry. His work in Hawaii began on October 19, 1842, under the help and support of the American Seaman's Friend Society. He was the pastor of Bethel Church for 42 years (1841 to 1882), where he preached every Sunday, not only to sailors but also to merchants, sea captains and many others who were drawn to this well-known place of worship.

The Seamen's Bethel Church burned down in 1886, one year after Damon's death. The congregation has since evolved into the Central Union Church of Honolulu.

== Early life ==
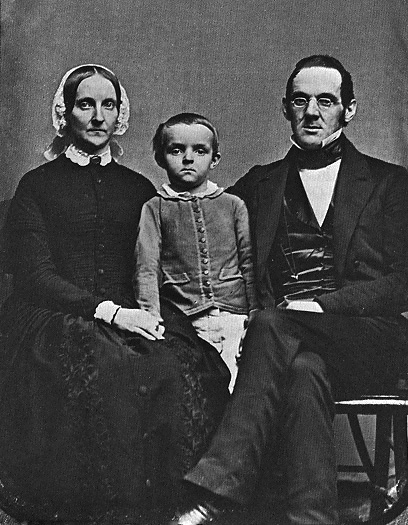
Damon with wife, Julia Sherman Mills, and son, Samuel Mills Damon

Samuel Chenery Damon, son of Colonel Samuel Damon and Alony Chenery, was born in Holden, Massachusetts on February 15, 1815.

He graduated from Amherst College in 1836, studied at Princeton Theological Seminary in 1838–39, and graduated from Andover Theological Seminary in 1841. Before studying for the ministry, he was for a year principal of the academy at Salisbury, Connecticut, and while in the divinity school was tutor in a private family in Burlington, New Jersey.

He married Julia Sherman Mills (1817–1890) in Natick, Massachusetts, on October 6, 1841; they had five sons. She was the daughter of Samuel John Mills (1783–1818), a minister who took part in the Haystack Prayer Meeting which led to forming the American Board of Commissioners for Foreign Missions.

== Ministry ==
Damon was preparing to go to India as a missionary and was studying the Tamil language for that purpose, when an urgent call came for a seaman's chaplain at the port of Honolulu in the Hawaiian islands. He was ordained to the Congregational ministry on September 15, 1841, and he decided to accept the position at Honolulu.

He began his work there October 19, 1842, under the auspices of the American Seaman's Friend Society. At the time around one hundred and fifty whaling vessels entered the port every year. Damon said, "From 1842 to 1867, at the lowest estimate six thousand seamen annually entered the port. During these twenty-five years my labors were abundant and sometimes, beyond my strength."

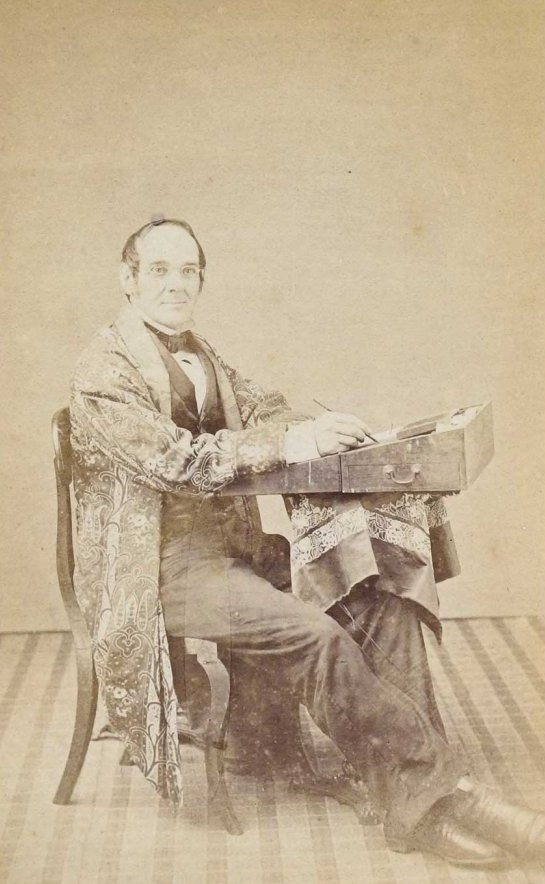
Damon was the editor of The Friend from 1843 to 1884.

For 42 years he was the pastor of Bethel Church, from 1841 to 1882. He preached there every Sunday, not only to sailors but also to merchants, sea captains and many others who were drawn to this place of worship. He was an able speaker and was constantly in demand on public occasions.

In 1855 he founded the Honolulu Sailor's Home and held services for sailors who died without family to be buried in the Oahu Cemetery.

He was the editor and publisher of The Friend, a monthly newspaper for seamen which included news from both American and English newspapers as well as announcements of upcoming events, reprints of sermons, poetry, local news, editorials, ship arrivals and departures and a listing of marriages and deaths. He published between a half million and a million copies of The Friend, most of which he personally distributed.

He was a strong supporter of the Chinese Christians in Honolulu. He made his church available for Sunday afternoon services, and later started a small night school in the parish hall to teach them English. From this humble beginning the Chinese Christian community began to outgrow their meeting place. In 1877, Damon assisted in organizing the first Chinese Church in Hawaii and was elected to the board of trustees.

Damon traveled extensively throughout his life. In 1849 he visited California and Oregon. In 1851 he visited the United States, coming by way of the Isthmus of Panama, and returning in 1852 to the Hawaiian Islands. In 1861 he made a tour of the Micronesian Islands on the missionary ship, the Morning Star. In 1869 he came home again and then traveled through England, Palestine, Egypt and Greece, returning to Honolulu in 1870. In 1876 he came home again and visited the Centennial Exposition at Philadelphia. In 1880 he came to the United States once more and made another and more extensive trip abroad, visiting England, Scotland, Germany, Austria, Switzerland and France. It is said that he also visited China and Japan.

He received the degree of Doctor of Divinity from his alma mater Amherst in 1867. He became a member of the American Antiquarian Society of Worcester, Massachusetts in 1869, and in 1879 a corresponding member of the New England Historic Genealogical Society.

== Death ==
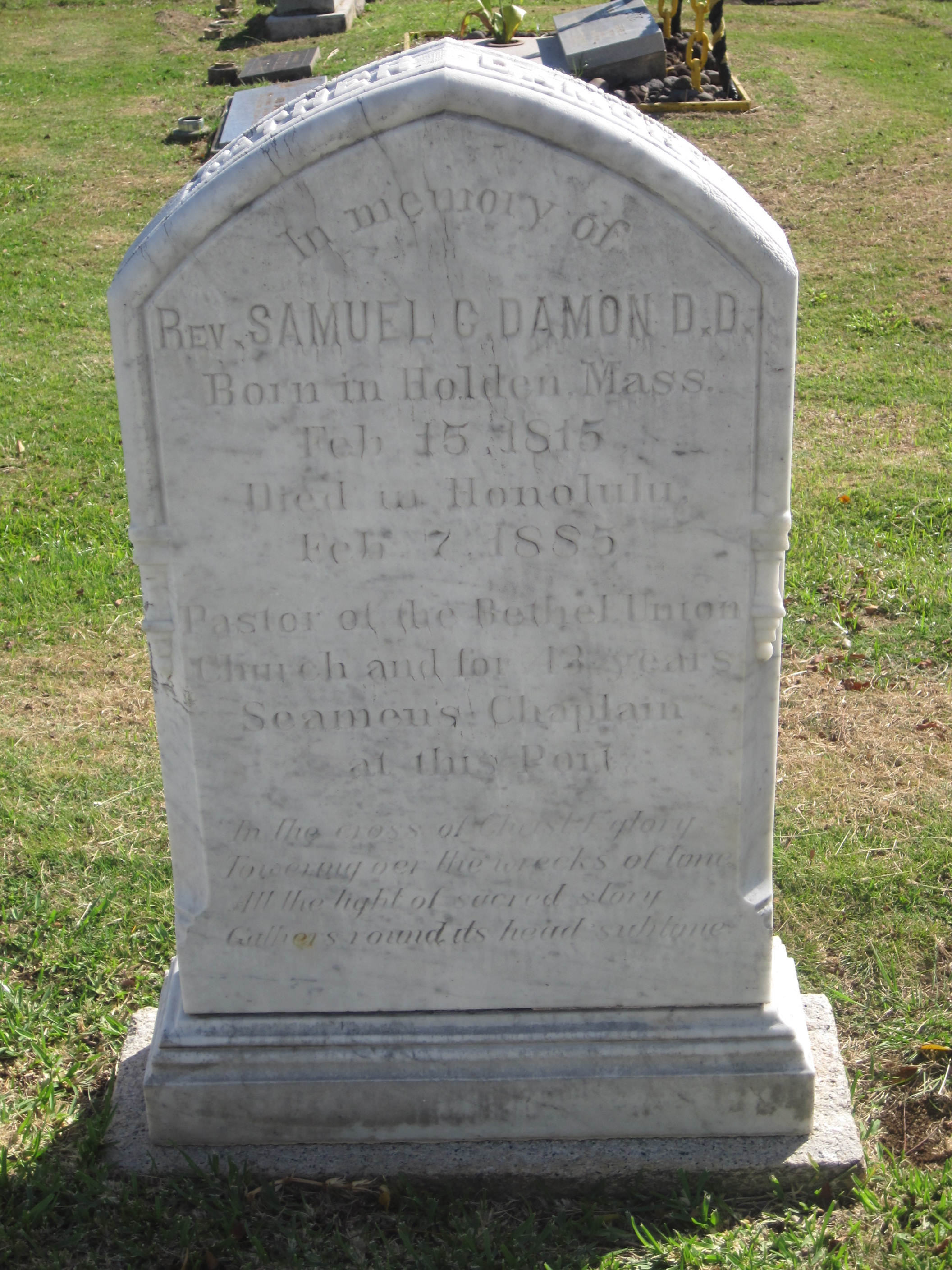
Damon's tombstone in Oahu Cemetery

Damon died on February 7, 1885, at Honolulu, and his funeral the next day was attended by a very large congregation, including King Kalakaua and his ministers. It was said of him:

"He was one of nature's noblemen—of fine personal appearance, always pleasant and cheerful, happy and always laboring to make others happy here and hereafter—a truly model Christian man and it may justly be said that the world was made better by his having lived in it."

The Seamen's Bethel Church burned down in 1886. The congregation has evolved into the Central Union Church of Honolulu.

His son, Samuel Mills Damon (1845–1924), married Harriet Melinda Baldwin, daughter of missionary physician Dwight Baldwin, and became a wealthy banker. At one time they were the fourth largest private landowner in Hawaii. Their collection of artifacts was donated to the Bernice P. Bishop Museum in 2007, after the last grandchild of Samuel Mills died in 2004. Samuel Mills had served as a founding trustee of the museum, and was minister of finance of the Kingdom of Hawaii.

His son Francis Williams Damon (December 10, 1852 – June 22, 1915) married Mary Rebecca Happer, the daughter of Andrew Patton Happer, and continued working with the Chinese mission in Honolulu. Another son, Edward Chenery Damon, married Cornelia Beckwith on April 17, 1877. Their daughter Ethel Moseley Damon (1883–1965) became an educator and author.
