= Church of Christ in China =

Coalition of churches in mainland China

The Church of Christ in China (traditional Chinese: 中華基督教會; simplified Chinese: 中华基督教会; pinyin: Zhonghua Jidu Jiaohui) was a coalition of churches in mainland China, established in the early half of the twentieth century. After missionaries were expelled from China in the 1950s, it would continue to exist primarily in the Hong Kong Council of the Church of Christ in China.

== History ==
The Church of Christ in China held its first general assembly in Shanghai in October 1927 with Cheng Jingyi as its first moderator, serving two terms (1927–1930 and 1930–1933). It was initially known as the Presbyterian Church of China (traditional Chinese: 中華基督教長老會; simplified Chinese: 中华基督教长老会; pinyin: Zhonghua Jidujiao Zhanglaohui) since it brought together a number of Presbyterian and Reformed churches. However, it was renamed after it invited other church bodies in China to join the union. At the first general assembly in 1927, the following groups joined the union:

- American Board of Commissioners for Foreign Missions
- Baptist Missionary Society
- Church of Scotland
- London Missionary Society
- Presbyterian Church in Korea
- Presbyterian Church in the United States of America (North)
- Presbyterian Church in the United States (South)
- Presbyterian Church of England
- Presbyterian Church of Ireland
- Presbyterian Church of New Zealand
- Reformed Church in America
- Reformed Church in the United States
- South Fujian Conference of the Methodist Episcopal Church
- United Brethren in Christ
- United Church of Canada.

The fourth general assembly was held in Qingdao in 1937, with a total of 16 synods, 85 associations, 2842 local churches, 454 ordained ministers and approximately 130,000 communicants. The next one was never materialized due to the outbreak of World War II. After the Chinese Communist Party took over mainland China, the Hong Kong Council of the Church of Christ in China was reorganized in 1953, and is the only subdivision of the Church of Christ in China that is still running.

== Ecumenical Relations ==
The establishment of the Church of Christ in China was seen as an extension of the modern ecumenical movement, related to the 1910 World Missionary Conference in Edinburgh. But it also wrestled with different understandings of ecumenism and ecclesiology, which would have lasting effects on questions of church unity in mainland China until the present day.

As the last remaining part of the Church of Christ in China still in operation, the Hong Kong Council is a member of the Christian Conference of Asia.

== See also ==
- Hong Kong Council of the Church of Christ in China
- Canadian Methodist Mission
- Methodism in Sichuan
- Christianity in China
  - Protestantism in China
