= International Missionary Council =

Former ecumenical Protestant Christian missionary organization

The International Missionary Council (IMC) was an ecumenical Protestant Christian missionary organization established in 1921, which in 1961, merged with the World Council of Churches (WCC), becoming the WCC's Division of World Mission and Evangelism.

== History ==
A continuation committee was established following the 1910 World Missionary Conference held in Edinburgh, which culminated in the creation of the International Missionary Council in 1921 in London. Like the Edinburgh conference, it was created to continue ecumenical efforts towards Christian mission through a series of meetings:

- 1928 in Jerusalem
- 1938 in Tambaram (near Madras, India)
- 1947 in Whitby, Canada
- 1952 in Willingen, Germany
- 1958 in Achimota (near Accra, Ghana)
- 1961 in New Delhi

It was in the final 1961 meetings when the IMC was integrated with the Commission on World Mission and Evangelism of the World Council of Churches, forming the Division of World Mission and Evangelism.

== Records ==
The IMC archives are held at the World Council of Churches in Geneva. Microfiche copies can be found in various library records.

At Yale University Library:

- Part 1: Early History and Committees
- Part 2: Staff and Officers Correspondence
- Part 3: Program Documentation
- Part 4: Research and Study Program
- Part 5: Country Files: Europe
- Part 6: Country Files: Asia

At Columbia University's Burke Library:

- MRL12: International Missionary Council records, 1913-1962
