= 1910 World Missionary Conference =

Christian conference

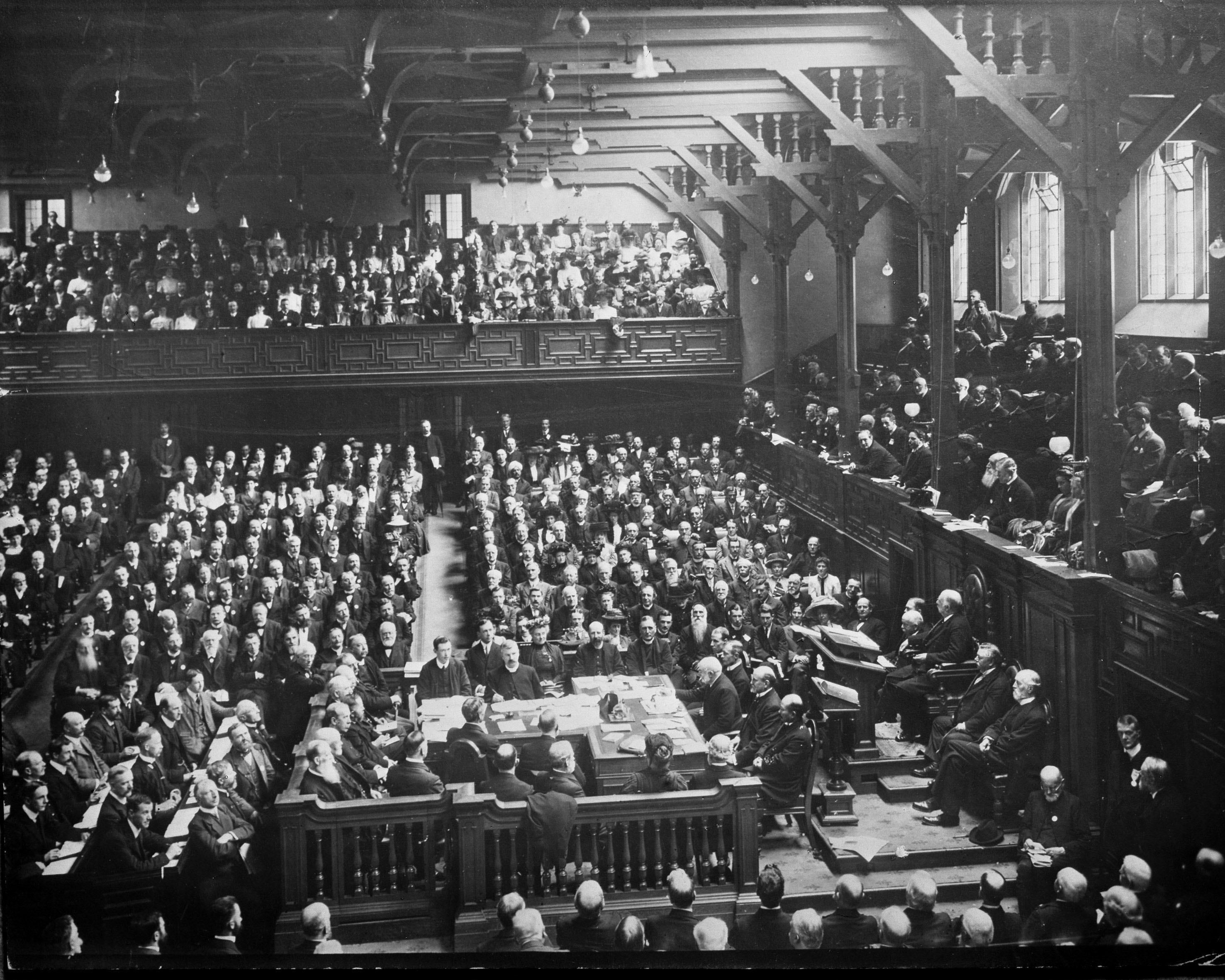
The 1910 World Missionary Conference, or the Edinburgh Missionary Conference

The 1910 World Missionary Conference, or the Edinburgh Missionary Conference, was held on 14 to 23 June 1910. Some have seen it as both the culmination of nineteenth-century Protestant Christian missions and the formal beginning of the modern Protestant Christian ecumenical movement, after a sequence of interdenominational meetings that can be traced back as far as 1854.

== Previous conferences ==
The first major missionary conference occurred from June 9 to 19, 1888 in London, the Centenary Missions Conference. With 1,579 delegates from European, North American, South American, and African nations, the ecumenical conference included representatives from 139 different Protestant denominations. The conference exemplified desires to unite Protestantism while spreading the gospel, and "civilization," with it.

The next international missionary conference occurred in New York at Carnegie Hall. Held from April 21 to May 1, 1900, this was the highest attended international conference to date, with up to 200,000 attendees. It boasted prominent attendees such as President William McKinley and New York Governor Theodore Roosevelt, signifying the cultural prominence of missionary efforts and its connection to imperialism and the "white man's burden" as western countries tried to mold foreign nations in their image through this "civilizing" process.

== Edinburgh 1910 ==
Major Protestant and Anglican denominations and missionary societies, predominantly from North America and Northern Europe, sent 1,215 representatives to Edinburgh, Scotland. Delegation was usually based on the annual expenditure of the missionary societies; one hundred additional special delegates were appointed by the British, Continental, and American Executive Committees. No Eastern Orthodox or Catholic missionary organizations were invited. Only 18 delegates were from non-Westerners. Anglo-Catholics agreed to participate only after the British Executive Committee agreed to add the subtitle “to consider Missionary Problems in Relation to the Non-Christian World” to the conference title and to define the non-Christian world as excluding areas of the world that were Christian but mostly non-evangelical, such as Latin America.

Lord Balfour of Burleigh, of the Church of Scotland, a former Unionist cabinet minister, was the President of the World Missionary Conference. American John R. Mott, an American Methodist layperson and leader of both the Student Volunteer Movement for Foreign Missions and the World Student Christian Federation, chaired its proceedings. The main organiser was Joseph Oldham, a leader in the Student Christian Movement. The conference was held in the Assembly Hall of the United Free Church of Scotland.

The formal title of this conference should be called the "third ecumenical missionary conference," because the first and the second had already taken place in London in 1888 and New York in 1900, respectively.

Before the conference convened, eight assigned commissions, each with twenty members, conducted two years of research on their assigned topic. Each commission produced a single volume report, which was distributed to all of the delegates before they headed to Scotland and discussed at the assembly during the Conference.

The eight commissions and their date of presentation at the conference are as follows:

1. Carrying the Gospel to all the Non-Christian World (June 15, 1910)
2. The Church in the Mission Field (June 16, 1910)
3. Education in Relation to the Christianization of National Life (June 17, 1910)
4. Missionary Message in Relation to the Non-Christian World (June 18, 1910)
5. The Preparation of Missionaries (June 22, 1910)
6. The Home Base of Missions (June 23, 1910)
7. Missions and Governments (June 20, 1910)
8. Co-Operation and the Promotion of Unity (June 21, 1910)

A ninth volume, containing the proceedings and major speeches, was published after the conclusion of the conference. For one, a notable German medical missionary, Gottlieb Olpp, described "the work that has commenced auspiciously in Germany" and ended his address with reverence to "the great missionary, Livingstone" and "our Lord Jesus Christ."

The spirit of the conference was driven by the watchword of the Protestant Christian Missionary community at the time: "The Evangelization of the World in This Generation." Thus, sentiments of obligation and urgency drove many of the commission reports, discussions and speeches at the conference. A call to unity among Protestant missionaries was also a common desire expressed at the conference, although no common liturgy was celebrated among the delegates while in Edinburgh. In his 1947 book What Must the Church Do?, Robert S. Bilheimer used the phrase "New Reformation" to refer to the ecumenical movement that resulted from the conference, and this usage became commonplace thereafter.

== Subsequent events ==
In the years following the conference, Mott was especially energetic in promoting indigenisation of the evangelisation process. A Continuation Committee was formed under his leadership and he recruited thirty five members to carry out this mission. One important member was the only representative from China to speak at the conference, Cheng Jingyi, whose address to the conference had been especially fervent on the issue of turning leadership of mission organizations to native leaders.

In the next few years, members of this committee, under Mott's direction, headed to India, Burma, Malaysia, China, Korea, and Japan to gather information. The work of the Continuation Committee was interrupted by World War I, but formed the foundation for the establishment of the International Missionary Council, established in 1921. Later, in 1948, the World Council of Churches formed.

== Centennial 2010 meetings ==
In celebration of its 100-year anniversary, a new World Missionary Conference was held in Edinburgh in 2010. Like the 1910 original, it was preceded by discussions on reports written by nine appointed study groups. There was a delegate conference in Edinburgh from 2–6 June 2010, which included representatives of the Evangelical, Protestant, Orthodox and Pentecostal churches, and the Catholic Church. It produced a common call to mission. Recognising the global nature of modern Christianity and the wide appreciation of the Edinburgh 2010 legacy across churches and mission bodies, many other events and study processes took place throughout the year. The whole process was co-ordinated through the Edinburgh 2010 website, where documents, videos, photos, etc. are available.

Also in 2010, three other major conferences were held to commemorate Edinburgh 1910. The first was held in Tokyo as a gathering of global mission leaders, from May 11–14th, called the Global Mission Consultation. The next gathering, the Third International Congress of the Lausanne Movement, was held in Cape Town, South Africa, from 16–25 October 2010. The third gathering was held in Boston, from November 4–7. Each of these four gatherings reflected on the significance and outcomes of Edinburgh 1910 over the last century. They also looked to the future of the Church's global mission in the century ahead. The meetings in Edinburgh and Boston were more ecumenical in representation, and the meetings in Tokyo and Cape Town were primarily evangelical. The Tokyo meeting was organized and designed for evangelical mission leaders, and the Cape Town meeting was organized and designed for a broad representation of Church and mission leaders.

== See also ==
- Timeline of Christian missions
- Tokyo 2010
- Category:Christian missionary societies
