= Chunghua University =

Chunghua University may refer to:

- Chung Hua University, a university in Taiwan
- Wuchang Chunghua University, a defunct university in China
