= Liang Qichao =

Chinese politician, activist and journalist (1873–1929)

- 梁啓超
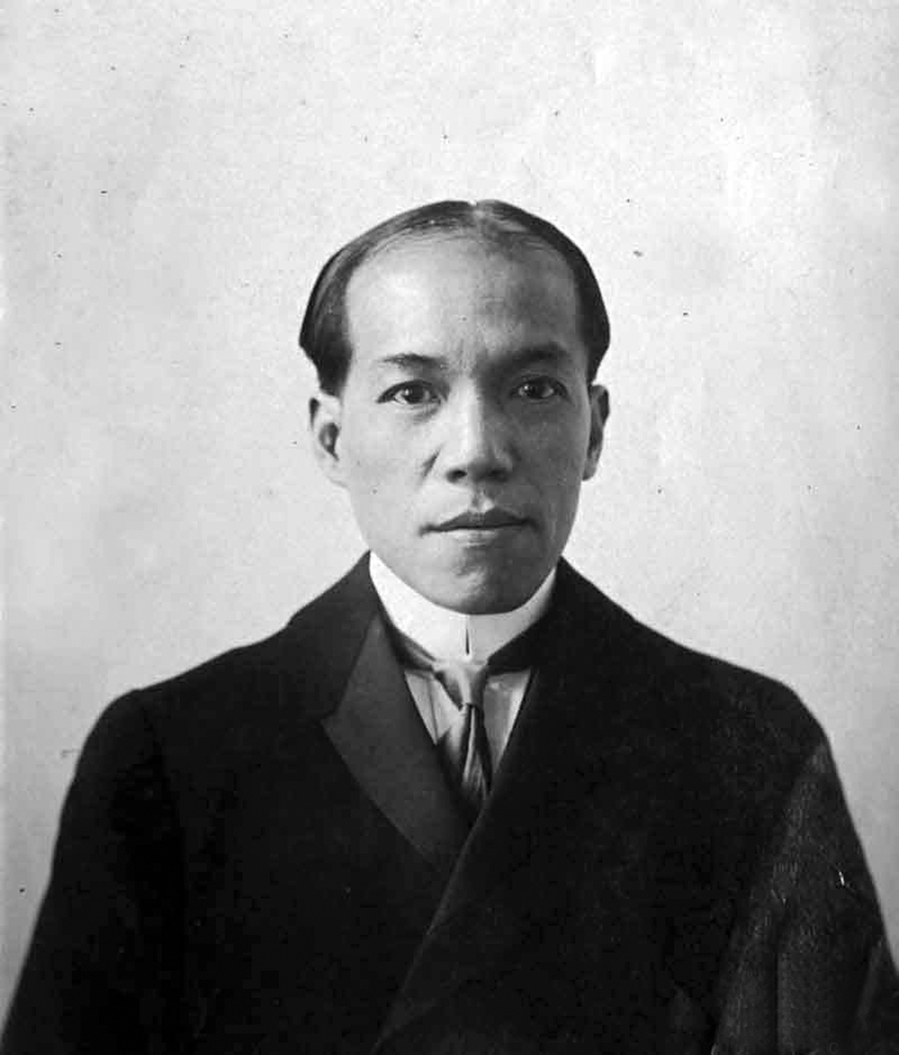
- Liang in 1910

Director of the Imperial Library of Peking
- In office December 1925 – June 1927
- Preceded by: Chen Renzhong
- Succeeded by: Guo Zongxi

Minister of Finance of the Republic of China
- In office July 1917 – November 1917
- Premier: Duan Qirui
- Preceded by: Li Jingxi
- Succeeded by: Wang Kemin

Minister of Justice of the Republic of China
- In office September 1913 – February 1914
- Premier: Xiong Xiling
- Preceded by: Xu Shiying
- Succeeded by: Zhang Zongxiang

Personal details
- Born: February 23, 1873 Xinhui, Guangdong, Qing China
- Died: January 19, 1929 (aged 55) Peking Union Medical College Hospital, Beiping (now Beijing), Republic of China
- Party: Progressive Party
- Spouses: Li Huixian (m. 1891) Wang Guiquan (m. 1903)
- Children: 9, including Liang Sicheng and Liang Siyong
- Education: Jinshi degree in the Imperial Examination
- Occupation: Historian; journalist; philosopher; politician; educators; writers; revolutionaries; new jurists; social activists

Liang Qichao
- Traditional Chinese: 梁啓超
- Simplified Chinese: 梁启超
Transcriptions
Standard Mandarin
- Hanyu Pinyin: Liáng Qǐchāo
- Wade–Giles: Liang^{2} Ch'i^{3}-ch'ao^{1}
- IPA: [ljǎŋ tɕʰì.ʈʂʰáʊ]
Yue: Cantonese
- Yale Romanization: Lèuhng Kái-chīu
- Jyutping: Loeng^{4} Kai^{2}-ciu^{1}
- IPA: [lœŋ˩ kʰɐj˧˥.tsʰiw˥]
other Yue
- Taishanese: Liang^{3} Kai^{2}-ciau^{1}

Liang Qichao (Chinese: 梁啓超; Wade–Giles: Liang^{2} Chʻi^{3}-chʻao^{1}; Jyutping: Loeng4 Kai2 Ciu1; February 23, 1873 – January 19, 1929) was a Chinese politician, social and political activist, journalist, and intellectual. His thought had a significant influence on the political reformation of modern China. He inspired Chinese scholars and activists with his writings and reform movements. His translations of Western and Japanese books into Chinese further introduced new theories and ideas and inspired young activists. Liang was of Taishanese descent.

In his youth, Liang joined his teacher Kang Youwei in the Hundred Days' Reform of 1898. When the movement was defeated, he fled to Japan and promoted a constitutional monarchy and organized political opposition to the dynasty. After the revolution of 1911, he joined the Beiyang government, serving as the chief justice and the first president of the currency system bureau. He became dissatisfied with Yuan Shikai and launched a movement to oppose his ambition to be emperor. After Yuan's death, he served as the finance chief of the Duan Qirui cabinet and as supervisor of the Salt Administration. He advocated the New Culture Movement and supported cultural change but not political revolution.

== Biography ==
=== Family ===
Liang Qichao was born in a small village in Xinhui, Guangdong Province on February 23, 1873. Liang's father, Liang Baoying (梁寶瑛, Cantonese: Lèuhng Bóu-yīng; courtesy name Lianjian 蓮澗; Cantonese: Lìhn-gaan), was a farmer and local scholar, but had a classical background that emphasized on tradition and education for ethnic rejuvenescence allowed him to be introduced to various literary works at six years old. By the age of nine, Liang started writing thousand-word essays and became a district-school student soon after. Liang had two wives: Li Huixian (李惠仙; Cantonese: Léih Waih-sīn) and Wang Guiquan (王桂荃; Cantonese: Wòhng Gwai-chyùhn). They gave birth to nine children, all of whom became successful individuals through Liang's strict and effective education. Three of them were scientific personnel at the Chinese Academy of Sciences, including Liang Sicheng, the prominent historian of Chinese architecture.

=== Early life ===
Liang passed the Xiucai degree provincial examination at the age of 11. In 1884, he undertook the arduous task of studying for the traditional governmental exams. At the age of 16, he passed the Juren second level provincial exams and was the youngest successful candidate at that time.

In 1890, Liang failed in his Jinshi degree national examinations in Beijing and never earned a higher degree. He took the exams along with Kang Youwei, a famous Chinese scholar and reformist. According to one popular narrative of Liang's failure to pass the Jinshi, the examiner was determined to flunk Kang for his heterodox challenge to existing institutions, but since the exams were all anonymous, he could only presume that the exam with the most unorthodox views was Kang's. Instead, Kang disguised himself by writing an eight-legged essay espousing traditionalist ideas and passed the exam while Liang's paper, which was assumed to be Kang's, failed.

Inspired by the book Illustrated Treatise on the Maritime Kingdoms by the reform Confucian scholar Wei Yuan, Liang became extremely interested in western political thought. After returning home, Liang went on to study with Kang Youwei, who was teaching at Wanmu Caotang in Guangzhou. Kang's teachings about foreign affairs fueled Liang's interest in reforming China.

In 1895, Liang went to the capital Beijing again with Kang for the national examination. During the examination, he was active in the Gongche Shangshu movement. After failing to pass the examination for a second time, he stayed in Beijing to help Kang publish Domestic and Foreign Information. He also helped to organize the Society for National Strengthening, where Liang served as secretary. For time, he was also enlisted by the governor of Hunan, Chen Baozhen to edit reform-friendly publications, such as the Hunan Daily (Xiangbao 湘報) and the Hunan Journal (Xiang xuebao 湘學報).

=== Reform movements ===
As an advocate of constitutional monarchy, Liang was unhappy with the governance of the Qing Government and wanted to change the status quo in China. He organized reforms with Kang Youwei by putting their ideas on paper and sending them to the Guangxu Emperor (reigned 1875–1908) of the Qing dynasty. This movement is known as the Wuxu Reform or the Hundred Days' Reform. Their proposal asserted that China was in need of more than self-strengthening, and called for many institutional and ideological changes such as getting rid of corruption and remodeling the state examination system. Liang thus was a major influence in the debates on democracy in China.

This proposal soon ignited a frenzy of disagreement, and Liang became a wanted man by order of Empress Dowager Cixi, the leader of the political conservative faction who later took over the government as regent. Cixi strongly opposed reforms at that time and along with her supporters, condemned the "Hundred Days' Reform" as being too radical.

In 1898, the Conservative Coup ended all reforms, and Liang fled to Japan, where he stayed for the next 14 years. While in Tokyo he befriended the influential politician and future Japanese Prime Minister Inukai Tsuyoshi. In Japan, he continued to actively advocate the democratic cause by using his writings to raise support for the reformers' cause among overseas Chinese and foreign governments. He continued to emphasize the importance of individualism, and to support the concept of a constitutional monarchy as opposed to the radical republicanism supported by the Tokyo-based Tongmenghui (the forerunner of the Kuomintang). During his time in Japan, Liang also served as a benefactor and colleague to Phan Boi Chau, one of Vietnam's most important anticolonial revolutionaries.

In 1899, Liang went to Canada, where he met Sun Yat-Sen among others, then to Honolulu in Hawaii. During the Boxer Rebellion, Liang was back in Canada, where he formed the "Chinese Empire Reform Association". This organization later became the Constitutionalist Party which advocated constitutional monarchy. While Sun promoted revolution, Liang preached incremental reform.

In 1900–1901, Liang visited Australia on a six-month tour that aimed at raising support for a campaign to reform the Chinese empire and thus modernize China through adopting the best of Western technology, industry and government systems. He also gave public lectures to both Chinese and Western audiences around the country. This visit coincided with the Federation of the six British colonies into the new nation of Australia in 1901. He felt this model of integration might be an excellent model for the diverse regions of China. He was feted by politicians, and met the first Prime Minister of Australia, Edmund Barton. He returned to Japan later that year.

In 1903, Liang embarked on an eight-month lecture tour throughout the United States, which included a meeting with President Theodore Roosevelt in Washington, DC, before returning to Japan via Vancouver, British Columbia, Canada.

While living in Japan in 1905, Liang supported the Constitutionalist movement within the Qing administration.

The descendant of Confucius Duke Yansheng was proposed as a replacement for the Qing dynasty as Emperor by Liang Qichao.

=== Politician ===
For the construction of a modern nation-state, Liang focused on two relative political questions. The first was the ways by which people became citizens in a modern nation-state, as Liang thought Chinese needed to improve civic ethos to build the nation-state in the Qing dynasty. The second was the meaning of citizenship itself; Liang thought both questions were important achieving reformation and modernization under Qing rule. In Liang's view, Chineseness was a cultural concept rather than an ethnic concept. Liang viewed China as weak not because of ethnic Manchu rule, but because of its cultural customs formed over millennia. From his perspective, an "imperial strategy" to combine all Chinese ethnicities into one nation was the best path to a strong China.

Liang's view of race was based on a taxonomy of "noble", "superior", and "historical" races compared to "low", "inferior", and "ahistorical races". He deemed "whites" and "yellows" as competing, with "brown," "black," and "red" peoples in subordinate position. Qing-era and Republican-era reformers used Liang's ideas along with the concept of a Chinese lineage-race in their discourses about building a stronger China.

With the overthrow of the Qing dynasty, constitutional monarchy became an increasingly irrelevant topic. Liang merged his renamed Democratic Party with the Republicans to form the new Progressive Party. He was very critical of Sun Yatsen's attempts to undermine President Yuan Shikai. Though usually supportive of the government, he opposed the expulsion of the Nationalists from parliament.

Liang's thought was influenced by the West, and he learned about the new political thought and regimes of the Western countries, and he learned these from the Japanese translation books, and he learned the Western thought through Meiji Japan to analyze the knowledge of the West.

In 1915, he opposed Yuan's attempt to make himself emperor. He convinced his disciple Cai E, the military governor of Yunnan, to rebel. Progressive party branches agitated for the overthrow of Yuan and more provinces declared their independence. The revolutionary activity that he had frowned upon was utilized successfully. Besides Duan Qirui, Liang was the biggest advocate of entering World War I on the Allied side. He felt it would boost China's status and also ameliorate foreign debts. He condemned his mentor, Kang Youwei, for assisting in the failed attempt to restore the Qing in July 1917.

Liang led a group of private citizens to the Paris Peace Conference to lobby for China's interests and provide reports back to China. The group viewed China's goals as recovering Qingdao, restoring the other aspects of China's sovereignty that had been lost through the unequal treaties, and becoming an equal member of the community of nations. Liang hoped that the conference would bring about a peaceful foundation for world relations. Liang became disillusioned by the failure of the conference to address China's rights and the poverty that he and the group saw in Europe. The impact of the group's reports back to China were one of the contributing factors to the May Fourth Movement.

The experience in Europe also led Liang to doubt the social Darwinism he had previously advocated, as well as rejecting extreme individualism.

After failing to turn Duan Qirui and Feng Guozhang into responsible statesmen, he gave up and left politics.

== Contributions to journalism ==
=== As a journalist ===
Lin Yutang once called Liang "the greatest personality in the history of Chinese journalism," while Joseph Levenson, author of Liang Ch'i-ch'ao and the Mind of Modern China, described Liang as "a brilliant scholar, journalist, and political figure."

Liang Qichao was the "most influential turn-of-the-century scholar-journalist," according to Levenson. Liang showed that newspapers and magazines could serve as an effective medium for communicating political ideas.

Liang, as a historian and a journalist, believed that both careers must have the same purpose and "moral commitment," as he proclaimed, "by examining the past and revealing the future, I will show the path of progress to the people of the nation." Thus, he founded his first newspaper, called the Qing Yi Bao (淸議報), named after a student movement of the Han dynasty.

Liang's exile to Japan allowed him to speak freely and exercise his intellectual autonomy. During his career in journalism, he edited two premier newspapers, Zhongwai Gongbao (中外公報) and Shiwu Bao (時務報).

He also published his moral and political ideals in Qing Yi Bao (淸議報) and New Citizen (新民叢報). In 1898, he described one of Qing Yi Bao's major goals as addressing China's history of national humiliation in order to help develop a new China.

In addition, he used his literary works to further spread his views on republicanism both in China and across the world. Accordingly, he had become an influential journalist in terms of political and cultural aspects by writing new forms of periodical journals. He published his articles in the magazine New Youth to expand the thought of science and democracy in the 1910s. Furthermore, journalism paved the way for him to express his patriotism.

=== New Citizen Journal ===
Liang produced a widely read biweekly journal called New Citizen (Xinmin Congbao 新民叢報), first published in Yokohama, Japan on February 8, 1902.

The journal covered many different topics, including politics, religion, law, economics, business, geography and current and international affairs. In the journal, Liang coined many Chinese equivalents for never-before-heard theories or expressions and used the journal to help communicate public opinion in China to faraway readers. Through news analyses and essays, Liang hoped that the New Citizen would be able to start a "new stage in Chinese newspaper history."

A year later, Liang and his co-workers saw a change in the newspaper industry and remarked, "Since the inauguration of our journal last year, there have come into being almost ten separate journals with the same style and design."

Liang spread his notions about democracy as chief editor of the New Citizen Journal. The journal was published without hindrance for five years but eventually ceased in 1907 after 96 issues. Its readership was estimated to be 200,000.

=== Role of the newspaper ===
As one of the pioneers of Chinese journalism of his time, Liang believed in the "power" of newspaper, especially its influence over government policies. In 1896, he wrote an editorial for the first issue of Shiwu bao (Contemporary affairs) titled, On the Benefits of the Press to State Affairs. In the editorial, Liang compared the circulation of information in a country to the blood and pulse of a body. Liang wrote that China was weak due to blockages of communication between the rulers, ministers, the people, and between China and the outside world. He criticized the Qing dynasty for its control on information, which to Liang implied a failure of political rationality.

Liang both praised Western freedom of the press and criticized Western media narratives of China for legitimizing colonization and conquest.

Using newspapers and magazines to communicate political ideas: Liang realised the importance of journalism's social role and supported the idea of a strong relationship between politics and journalism before the May Fourth Movement, (also known as the New Culture Movement). He believed that newspapers and magazines should serve as an essential and effective tool in communicating political ideas. The magazine New Youth became an important way to show his thought in the New Culture Movement, and his articles spread the ideas to the youth in that period. He believed that newspapers did not only act as a historical record, but was also a means to "shape the course of history."

Press as a weapon in revolution: Liang also thought that the press was an "effective weapon in the service of a nationalist uprising". In Liang's words, the newspaper is a "revolution of ink, not a revolution of blood." He wrote, "so a newspaper regards the government the way a father or elder brother regards a son or younger brother — teaching him when he does not understand, and reprimanding him when he gets something wrong." Undoubtedly, his attempt to unify and dominate a fast-growing and highly competitive press market has set the tone for the first generation of newspaper historians of the May Fourth Movement.

Newspaper as an educational program: Liang was well aware that the newspaper could serve as an "educational program", and said, "the newspaper gathers virtually all the thoughts and expressions of the nation and systematically introduces them to the citizenry, it being irrelevant whether they are important or not, concise or not, radical or not. The press, therefore, can contain, reject, produce, as well as destroy, everything."

For example, Liang wrote a well known essay during his most radical period titled "The Young China" and published it in his newspaper Qing Yi Bao (淸議報) on February 2, 1900. The essay established the concept of the nation-state and argued that the young revolutionaries were the holders of the future of China. This essay was influential on the Chinese political culture during the May Fourth Movement in the 1920s.

Weak press: However, Liang thought that the press in China at that time was quite weak, not only due to lack of financial resources and to conventional social prejudices, but also because "the social atmosphere was not free enough to encourage more readers and there was a lack of roads and highways that made it hard to distribute newspapers". Liang felt that the prevalent newspapers of the time were "no more than a mass commodity". He criticized that those newspapers "failed to have the slightest influence upon the nation as a society".

== Literary career ==
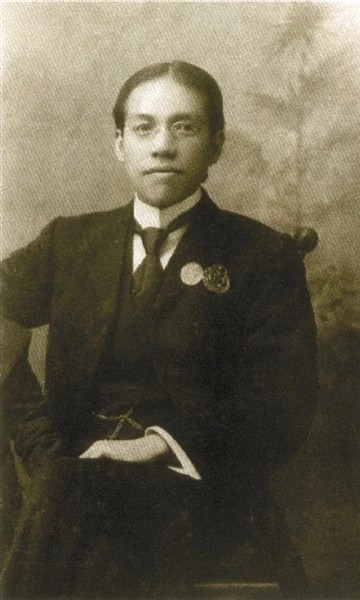
Liang Qichao

Liang Qichao was both a traditional Confucian scholar and a reformist. Liang Qichao contributed to the reform in late Qing by writing various articles interpreting non-Chinese ideas of history and government, with the intent of stimulating Chinese citizens' minds to build a new China. In his writings, he argued that China should protect the ancient teachings of Confucianism, but also learn from the successes of Western political life and not just Western technology.

Liang shaped the ideas of democracy in China, using his writings as a medium to combine Western scientific methods with traditional Chinese historical studies. Liang's works were strongly influenced by the Japanese political scholar Katō Hiroyuki, who used methods of social Darwinism to promote the statist ideology in Japanese society. Liang drew from much of his work and subsequently influenced Korean nationalists in the 1900s.

After the failure of constitutional reform, Liang founded the literary journal New Fiction as part of his effort to encourage intellectuals to use fiction for pedagogical and political purposes. Its inaugural editorial includes a saying by Liang which became famous: "to renew a people, we must first renew their fictions." In New Fiction, Liang published his novella The Future of New China. The novella depicts arguments between two characters who support constitutional monarchy and republican revolution respectively. The characters contest their political differences but are also connected through their desire to revive Chinese culture and the nation.

In his commentaries on religion, Liang viewed "knowledge-based faith" as valuable to the advancement of learning and human awakening. Liang rejected the existence of divine powers. He viewed the practice of spirit writing as superstition and an obstacle to Buddhist learning. According to Liang, spirit writing organizations like the Daoyuan and the Wushanshe were misusing faith for functional ends and to gain personal material benefits.

=== Historiographical thought ===
Liang Qichao's historiographical thought represents the beginning of modern Chinese historiography and reveals some important directions of Chinese historiography in the twentieth century.

For Liang, the major flaw of "old historians" (舊史家) was their failure to foster the national awareness necessary for a strong and modern nation. Liang's call for new history not only pointed to a new orientation for historical writing in China, but also indicated the rise of modern historical consciousness among Chinese intellectuals. He advocated the Great Man theory in his 1899 piece, "Heroes and the Times" (英雄與時勢, Yīngxióng yǔ Shíshì), and he also wrote biographies of European state-builders such as Otto von Bismarck, Horatio Nelson, Oliver Cromwell, Lajos Kossuth, Giuseppe Mazzini, and Camillo Benso, Count of Cavour; as well as Chinese men including Zheng He, Tan Sitong, and Wang Anshi.

During this period of Japan's challenge in the First Sino-Japanese War (1894–95), Liang was involved in protests in Beijing pushing for an increased participation in the governance by the Chinese people. It was the first protest of its kind in modern Chinese history. This changing outlook on tradition was shown in the historiographical revolution (史學革命) launched by Liang Qichao in the early twentieth century. Frustrated by his failure at political reform, Liang embarked upon cultural reform. In 1902, while in exile in Japan, Liang wrote "The New Historiography" (新史學), which called on Chinese to study world history to understand China rather than just Chinese history. The article also attacked old historiographical methods, which he lamented focused on dynasty over state; the individual over the group; the past but not the present; and facts, rather than ideals. He contended that Chinese must view their past in a different light and reconstruct it because "[i]f there is no historiographical revolution, our country cannot be saved."

=== Translator ===
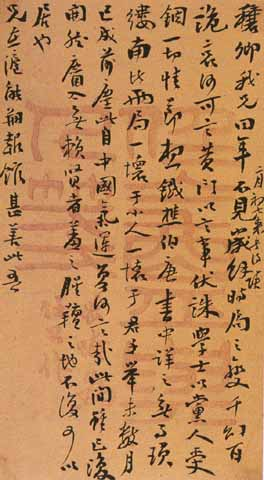
Liang's calligraphy

Liang was head of the Translation Bureau and oversaw the training of students who were learning to translate Western works into Chinese. He believed that this task was "the most essential of all essential undertakings to accomplish" because he believed Westerners were successful – politically, technologically and economically.

Philosophical Works: After escaping Beijing and the government crackdown on anti-Qing protesters, Liang studied the works of Western philosophers of the Enlightenment period, namely Hobbes, Rousseau, Locke, Hume and Bentham, translating them and introducing his own interpretation of their works. His essays were published in a number of journals, drawing interest among Chinese intellectuals who had been taken aback by the dismemberment of China's formidable empire at the hands of foreign powers.

Utilitarianism and 'Life-ism' (the continuous expansion and preservation of life) were advocated by Liang and Yan Fu, but drew criticism from Wang Guowei.

Western Social and Political Theories: In the early 20th century, Liang Qichao played a significant role in introducing Western social and political theories into Korea such as Social Darwinism and international law. Liang wrote in his well-known manifesto, New People (新民說):

"Freedom means Freedom for the Group, not Freedom for the Individual. (…) Men must not be slaves to other men, but they must be slaves to their group. For, if they are not slaves to their own group, they will assuredly become slaves to some other."

=== Poet and novelist ===
Liang was among the earliest writers of science fiction in China. His 1902 novel The Future of New China described potential political reforms for the self-strengthening of China and its development to world power status.

Liang advocated reform in both the genres of poem and novel. The Collected Works from the Ice-Drinker's Studio (飲冰室合集) is his representative works in literature compiled into 148 volumes.

Liang gained his idea of calling his work as Collected Works of Yinbingshi from a passage of Zhuangzi. It states that "Every morning, I receive the mandate [for action], every evening I drink the ice [of disillusion], but I remain ardent in my inner mind" (吾朝受命而夕飲冰，我其內熱與). As a result, Liang called his workplace as "The Ice-drinker's studio" (Yinbingshi), and addressed himself as Yinbingshi Zhuren (飲冰室主人), literally Host of the Ice-drinker's studio, in order to present his idea that he was worrying about all the political matters, so he would still try his best to reform the society by the effort of writings.

Liang also wrote fiction and scholarly essays on fiction, which included Fleeing to Japan after failure of Hundred Days' Reform (1898) and the essay On the Relationship Between Fiction and the Government of the People (論小說與群治之關係, 1902). These novels emphasized modernization in the West and the call for reform.

=== Educator ===
In the early 1920s, Liang retired from politics and taught at the Tung-nan University in Shanghai and Tsinghua University Research Institute in Peking. He founded the Jiangxue she (Chinese Lecture Association) and brought important intellectual figures to China, including Driesch and Rabindranath Tagore. Academically he was a renowned scholar of his time, introducing Western learning and ideology, and making extensive studies of ancient Chinese culture. He was impacted by a social-Darwinian perspective to researched approaches to combine western thought and Chinese learning.

As an educator, Liang Qichao thought children were the future of the development of China, and he thought that education was significant for children's growth, that traditional education approaches needed changing, and that educational reformation was key in modern China. He thought children needed to cultivate creative thinking and improve their ability to understand, and so the "new school" was important in instructing children in new approaches in education.

During this last decade of his life, published studies of Chinese cultural history, Chinese literary history and historiography. Liang reexamined the works of Mozi, and authored, amongst other works, The Political Thought of the Pre-Qing Period, and Intellectual Trends in the Qing Period. He also had a strong interest in Buddhism and wrote historical and political articles on its influence in China. Liang influenced many of his students in producing their own literary works. They included Xu Zhimo, renowned modern poet, and Wang Li, an accomplished poet and founder of Chinese linguistics as a modern discipline.

=== Publications ===
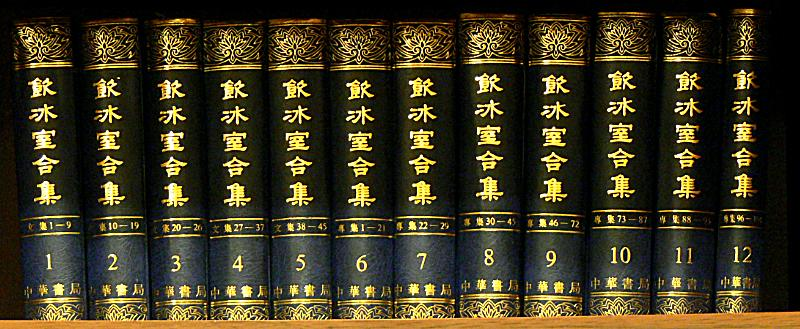
The Collected Works of Yinbingshi vol 1–12, written by Liang Qichao

- Introduction to the Learning of the Qing Dynasty (1920)
- The Learning of Mohism (1921)
- Chinese Academic History of the Recent 300 Years (1924)
- History of Chinese Culture (1927)
- The Construction of New China
- The Philosophy of Lao Tzu
- The History of Buddhism in China
- Collected Works of Yinbingshi, Zhonghua Book Co, Shanghai 1936, republished in Beijing, 2003, ISBN 7-101-00475-X /K.210

== Family ==
- Paternal grandfather
  - Liang Weiqing (梁維淸) (1815–1892), pseudonym Jingquan (鏡泉)
- Paternal grandmother
  - Lady Li (黎氏) (1817–1873), daughter of Guangxi admiral Li Diguang (黎第光)
- Father
  - Liang Baoying (梁寶瑛) (1849–1916), courtesy name Lianjian (蓮澗)
- Mother
  - Lady Zhao (趙氏) (1852–1887)
- First wife
  - Li Huixian (李蕙仙), married Liang Qichao in 1891, died of illness on September 13, 1924
- Second wife
  - Wang Guiquan (王桂荃), initially Li Huixian's handmaiden before becoming Liang Qichao's concubine in 1903

=== Issue and descendants ===
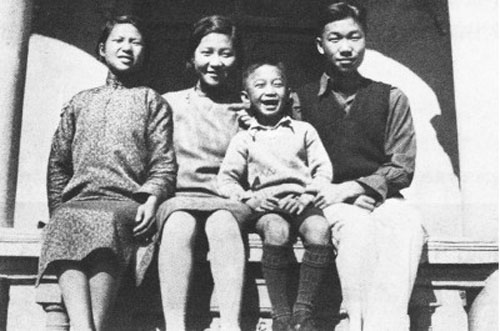
From left to right: Liang Sining, Liang Sirui, Liang Sili and Liang Sida, were at Tianjin in 1934.

- Eldest daughter: Liang Sishun (April 14, 1893 – 1966), became an accomplished poet, married Zhou Xizhe (周希哲) in 1925
  - Zhou Nianci (周念慈)
  - Zhou Tongshi (周同軾)
  - Zhou Youfei (周有斐)
  - Zhou Jiaping (周嘉平)
- Eldest son: Liang Sicheng (梁思成) (April 20, 1901 – January 9, 1972), became a famous architect and teacher, married Lin Huiyin (June 10, 1904 – April 1, 1955) in 1928
  - Son: Liang Congjie (梁從誡) (August 4, 1932 – October 28, 2010), prominent environmental activist, married firstly Zhou Rumei (周如枚), married secondly Fang Jing (方晶)
    - Son: Liang Jian (梁鑑), son of Zhou Rumei
    - Daughter: Liang Fan (梁帆), daughter of Fang Jing
  - Daughter: Liang Zaibing (梁再冰)
- 2nd son: Liang Siyong (梁思永) (July 24, 1904 – April 2, 1954), married Li Fuman (李福曼)
  - Daughter: Liang Baiyou (梁柏有)
- 3rd son: Liang Sizhong (梁思忠) (August 6, 1907 – 1932)
- 2nd daughter: Liang Sizhuang (梁思莊) (1908 – May 20, 1986), married Wu Luqiang (-hant吳魯強) in 1933
  - Daughter: Wu Liming (吳荔明)
    - Son: Yang Nianqun (楊念羣) (January 20, 1964–), male-line great-grandson late-Ch'ing era personage Yang Du
- 4th son: Liang Sida (梁思達) (December 16, 1912 – 2001), married Yu Xuezhen (俞雪臻)
  - Daughter: Liang Yibing (梁憶冰)
  - 1st son: Liang Renyou (梁任又)
  - 2nd son: Liang Renkan (梁任堪)
- 3rd daughter: Liang Siyi (梁思懿) (December 13, 1914 – 1988), married Zhang Weixun (張偉遜)
  - 1st daughter: Zhang Yuwen (張郁文)
  - 2nd son: Zhang Anwen (張安文)
- 4th daughter: Liang Sining (梁思寧) (October 30, 1916 – 2006), married Zhang Ke (章柯)
  - Zhang Antai (章安泰)
  - Zhang Anqiu (章安秋)
  - Zhang Anjian (章安建)
  - Zhang Hui (章惠)
  - Zhang Anning (章安寧)
- 5th son: Liang Sili (梁思禮) (August 24, 1924 – April 14, 2016), married Mai Xiuqiong (麥秀瓊)
  - Liang Zuojun (梁左軍)
  - Liang Hong (梁紅)
  - Liang Xuan (梁旋)

Liang Sishun, Liang Sicheng, and Liang Sizhuang were borne by Li Huixian. Liang Siyong, Liang Sizhong, Liang Sida, Liang Siyi, Liang Sining, and Liang Sili were borne by Wang Guiquan.

=== Legacy ===
Liang's pedigree book was once lost with only one page left. The family members recreated the naming method by giving sixteen characters in a sequence, each generation following one. Liang didn't follow it by using ‘思’ to his children.

Liang favored nationalism that incorporated different ethnic groups of the Qing empire to oppose Western imperialists. Despite the failures of his reforms, Liang's idea of Chinese nationalism based on the civic idea of Five Races Under One Union inspired Sun Yat-sen and the Kuomintang's nationalism, as well as the nationalist rhetoric of the CCP.

== See also ==
- Gongche Shangshu movement

Political offices
Preceded by Xu Shiying	Minister of Justice of the Republic of China; September 1913 – February 1914	Succeeded by Zhang Zongxiang
Preceded by Li Jingxi	Minister of Finance of the Republic of China; July 1917 – November 1917	Succeeded by Wang Kemin
Academic offices
Preceded by Chen Renzhong	Director of the Imperial Library of Peking; December 1925 – June 1927	Succeeded by Guo Zongxi
