= Central China Normal University =

Public normal university in Wuhan, Hubei, China

Coordinates: 30°31′21″N 114°22′10″E

- 华中师范大学
- Other name: CCNU
- Former name: Huazhong Normal University
- Motto: 求实创新, 立德树人
- Motto in English: Seek truth and innovation; foster virtue through education
- Type: Public
- Established: 1903; 123 years ago
- President: Zhao Lingyun (赵凌云)
- Faculty: 700 professors, 4,000 teaching staff
- Students: 22,000
- Location: Wuhan, Hubei, China
- Campus: Urban, 330 acres
- Website: www.ccnu.edu.cn

Chinese name
- Simplified Chinese: 华中师范大学
- Traditional Chinese: 華中師範大學
Transcriptions
Standard Mandarin
- Hanyu Pinyin: Huázhōng Shīfàn Dàxué
- Wade–Giles: Hua²-chung¹ Shih¹-fan⁴ Ta⁴-hsüeh²

Central China Normal University (CCNU) is a public normal school located in Wuhan, Hubei, China. It is affiliated with the Ministry of Education, and co-funded by the Hubei Provincial People's Government. The university is part of Project 211 and the Double First-Class Construction.

The campus of over 330 acres is on Guizi Hill, bordering South Lake.

== History ==
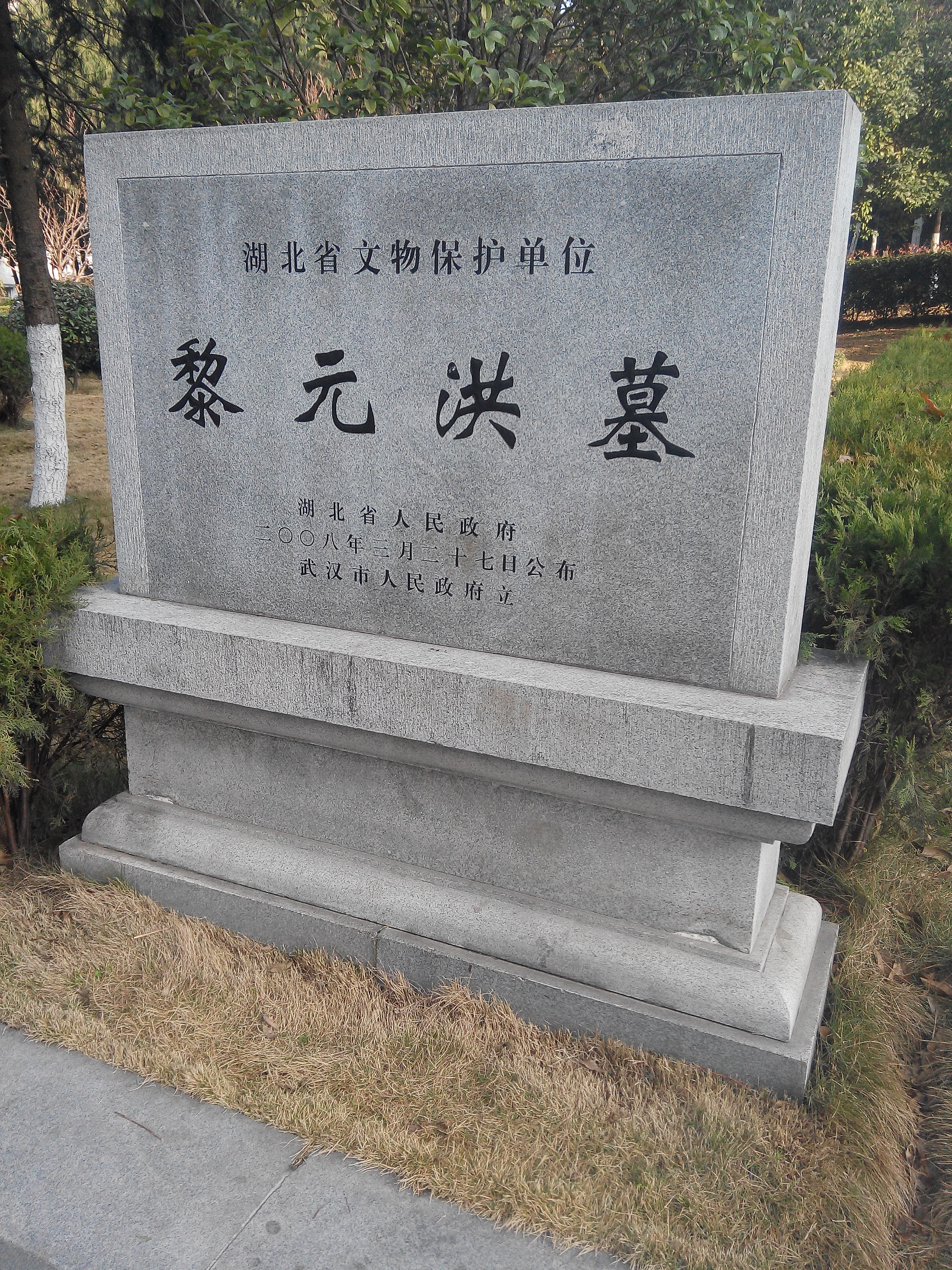
Tomb of Li Yuanhong

The predecessor of CCNU is the combination of Huachung University (华中大学), Chunghua University (私立武昌中华大学) and the Pedagogical College of Zhongyuan University, with Huachung University as the main part. Huachung University was the largest and most influential mission university in south central China and it developed from Boone College which was founded in 1903. In 1951 Huazhong University was created after the Pedagogical College of Zhongyuan University merged with Huachung University. Then it was reorganized into Huazhong Higher Normal College in 1952 and later renamed Central China Normal College in 1953. At this time a new campus was established east of Wuchang at Mount Zhutou (豬頭山), a location of over 700 graves and therefore a place thought to have a lot of Yin qi. The mountain was partially leveled off and renamed Mount Guizi (桂子山) after a plant that was widely planted on the mountain and is known for its Yang qi. In 1985 the university was formally named Central China Normal University. Deng Xiaoping, one of the founders of Zhongyuan University, inscribed the name of the university. In 1993 the President and General Secretary of the Chinese Communist Party, Jiang Zemin, wrote an inscription for the university "Developing normal education, improving the nation's quality".

=== Timeline ===
Boone College

- The earliest predecessor of the school was founded in 1903 as Boone College for undergraduates (started in 1871 as Boone College).

Private Huachung University

- 1924: Boone College was renamed to Huachung University
- 1929: Lake College of Yueyang incorporated, Yale College of Changsha incorporated.

Public Huazhong University

- After the founding of People's Republic of China, the former private status transformed to public Huazhong University.
- December 1949: incorporated Chung Yuan Christian University College of Education.

Central China Higher Normal College

- In 1952 during national college adjustment process the original public Huachung University included private Chunghua University, Guangxi University Institute of Education, Nanchang University, South China Normal University, Central Teachers College, Hainan Teachers College established the Central Higher Normal School (Central Ecole Normale Superieure).

Central China Normal College

- In 1953 the school was renamed the Central China Normal College.
- Part of Hubei University incorporated in 1962.
- Part of the South China Institute for Nationalities, Hubei Teachers Training College, Hubei Correspondence School incorporated in 1972.

Central China Normal University

- In 1985 the school was renamed to Central China Normal University, by Deng Xiaoping who wrote the school motto.
- 2005: entered the 211 key development universities list.
- 2007: received special funds from the 985 Innovative Platforms for Key Disciplines Project.
- 2017: entered the Double First-Class Construction.

== Present ==
University rankings

Global – Overall
- THE World: 501-600
- USNWR Global: 513

Regional – Overall
- QS Asia: =369 (2025)
- QS BRICS: 201-250
- THE Asia: 75 (2018)

Since the 7th Five-Year Plan was implemented the teaching staff have conducted scientific research projects such as the national high-tech project 863, national "Torch Program".

The university is one of the first institutions in China to offer doctoral and postgraduate degrees as well as confer titles of professor, associate professor and doctoral supervisor. It has established undergraduate, graduate, doctoral and post-doctoral programs and set up full-time adult-education programs.

The national social science research work of CCNU ranked 10th in China and its social science research work ranked 6th for four consecutive years by the Ministry of Education.

CCNU has cooperation with more than 20 universities, colleges and research institutes in America, Germany, Russia, Ukraine, France, Italy, Britain, Japan, Switzerland, Bulgaria and Brazil.

Foreign experts and teachers are invited to teach at the university and faculty members have gone abroad for joint research.

=== Facts ===
- School area: 1,266,500 square meters, school building area: 896,293 square meters
- Colleges: 27
- Undergraduate programs: 68
- National key disciplines: 8, National key (cultivating) discipline: 1
- Provincial and ministerial key disciplines: 22
- National bases for Personnel Training and Scientific Research in Arts and Sciences: 3
- National Engineering Research Center: 3
- National Humanities and Social Sciences key research bases: 3
- Key laboratories supervised by the Ministry of Education: 3
- Postdoctoral research programs: 13
- First-grade disciplines for Doctor's Degree: 14, First-grade disciplines for master's degree: 33
- Ph.D. programs: 94, Master's Degree programs: 184
- Professors: 478, Associate Professors: 579, PhD Supervisors: 269
- Full-time faculty: 1,834, Faculty and staff: 4,017
- Full-time students: 30,000, Postgraduates: 10,475, International students: 1,341
- Library area: 39,689 square meters, book collections: 2,962,000

=== National Key Disciplines ===
The Ministry of Education chose CCNU as one of the national key universities for a number of disciplines. They consist of Chinese and Foreign Political Systems, Theoretical Physics, Scientific Socialism and International Communist Movement, Education Theory, Chinese Modern and Contemporary History, Literature and Art Studies, Pesticide Science and Basic Principles of Marxism.

=== National Key Laboratories ===
CCNU hosts two national key laboratories that are sponsored by the central government and research centers recognized among worldwide academics: Laboratory for Quark and Lepton Physics and Laboratory for Pesticide Science and Chemical Biology.

=== Campus organizations and activities ===
There are nationality based student unions on campus. The Association of Kazakh Students is the largest one with nearly 100 members.

=== Campus canteens ===
Students are able to have meals in any of the seven canteens with a campus ID card. CCNU has implemented electronic student IDs that also serve as debit cards. Service desks and ID card machines are in every canteen during opening hours.

== Schools, departments and institutes ==
- College of International Cultural Exchange (Chinese: 国际文化交流学院; pinyin: Guójì Wénhuà Jiāoliú Xuéyuàn)
- School of Mathematics and Statistics
- Law School of Central China Normal University
- School of Urban and Environmental Science
- School of Life Science
- School of Chemistry
- School of Physical Science and Technology
- School of Sociology
- Institute of Political Science of Central China Normal University
- School of Psychology
- School of Educational Information Technology
- School of Journalism and Communication
- College of Vocational & Further Education
- College of Teachers Education
- School of Physical Education and Sports
- College of Music
- School of Public Administration
- School of Information Management
- Graduate School
- School of Political Communication
- School of Fine Arts
- School of Computer Science
- School of Chinese Language and Literature
- School of Education
- School of Economy and Manage
- School of History and Culture
- School of Foreign Languages
- Faculty of Artificial Intelligence in Education

== International cooperation ==
International partners include Oxford University, McGill University and Moscow State University. Cooperation agreements were signed in 2014 with GSI Helmholtz Centre for Heavy Ion Research, RMIT University and Macquarie University.

== Rankings ==
Rankings
National
ARWU	33
CUAA	30
Wu Shulian	31
Global
ARWU	500+
National by Subject (MOE)
Politics	3
Education	5
Psychology	5
Chinese Language and Literature	4
History of China	4
Information	5

== Ratings ==
- China University Center Ranking (Top 200 China University): 10th in China
- uniRank World University Ranking: 596th (42nd in China)
- Webometrics World University Ranking: 373rd (31st in China and 57th in Asia)
- Rating of Chinese Normal Universities: 3rd
- China Top 100 University Ranking: 40th
- Humanities and Social Sciences in China: 17th
- Political Science in China: 3rd
- Law Schools in China: 12th

== Notable alumni ==
- Yun Daiying (恽代英) - early leader of the Chinese Communist Party.
- Song Jiaoren (宋教仁) - republican revolutionary, political leader and a founder of the Kuomintang (KMT).
- Tang Haoming (唐浩明)- novelist. He is known for writing biographical novels of Zeng Guofan, Zhang Zhidong, and Yang Du. He is the vice president of Hunan Writers Association.
- Feng Gong (冯巩) - actor, xiangsheng performer, film director, and screenwriter from Tianjin, China. He is the great-grandson of Feng Guozhang, a statesman and warlord of China during the early 20th century.
- Feng Youlan (冯友兰) - philosopher who was instrumental for reintroducing the study of Chinese philosophy in the modern era.
- Huang Kan (黄侃) - philologist and revolutionary.
- Wu Mi (吴宓) - founder of Chinese comparative literature, a critic, redologist, educator and poet.
- Deng Xiaoping (邓小平) - co-founder of the Zhongyuan University, was a Chinese revolutionary and statesman. He was the leader of China from 1978 until his retirement in 1992.
- Chen Yi (陈毅) - co-founder of the Zhongyuan University. He served as Mayor of Shanghai from 1949 to 1958 and as Foreign Minister of China from 1958 to 1972.
- Dai Jianye - Chinese classical literature researcher.
- Jan Robert Go - Filipino Political Scientist.

== Notable professors ==
- Zhang Kaiyuan (章开沅): Former president of CCNU. He holds Honorary Doctor of Laws degrees from Augustana College, Soka University and Kansai University.
- Mary Tregear, British art historian and curator specialising in Chinese art

== Gallery ==
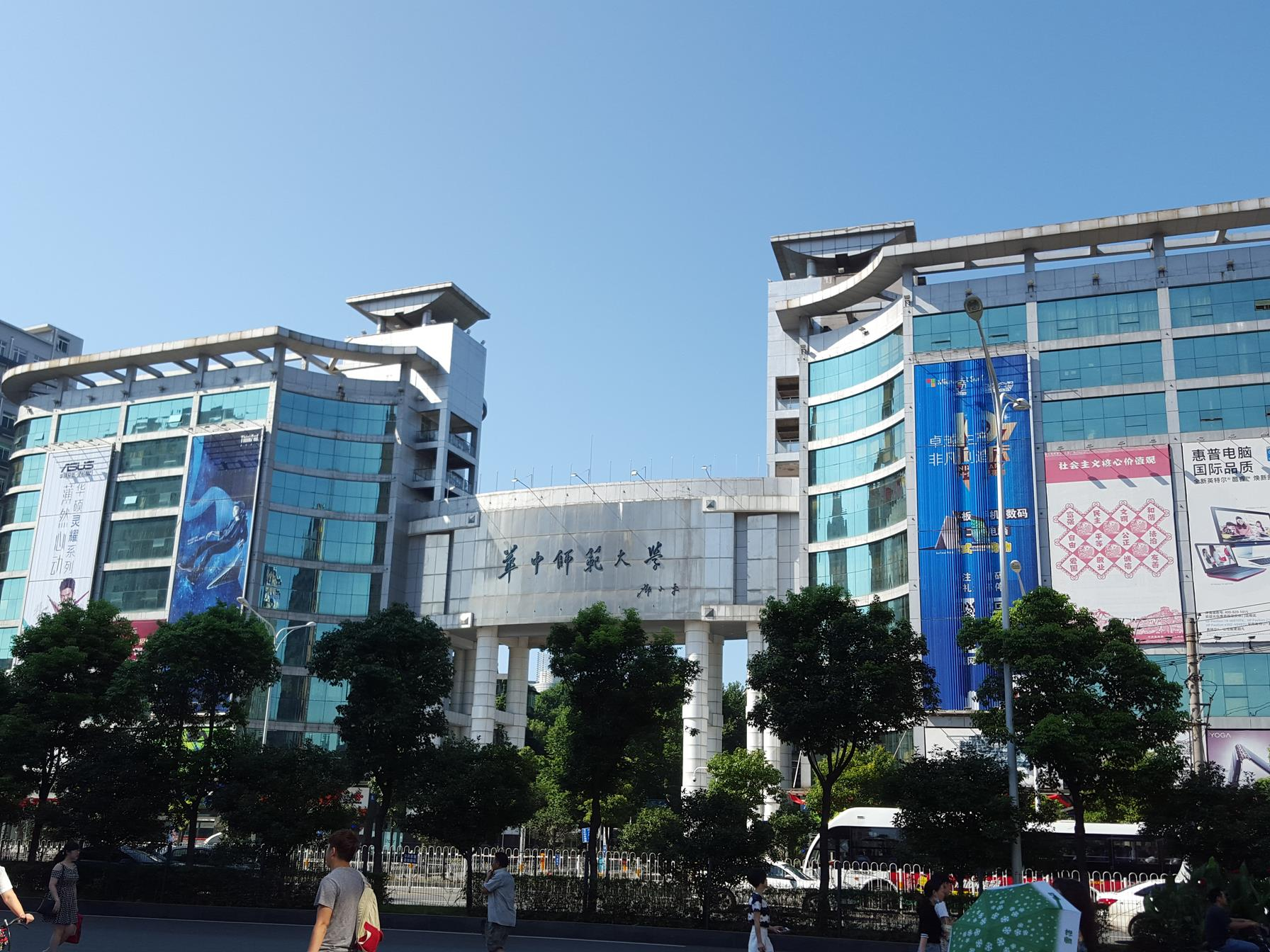
North Gate of CCNU (main gate)

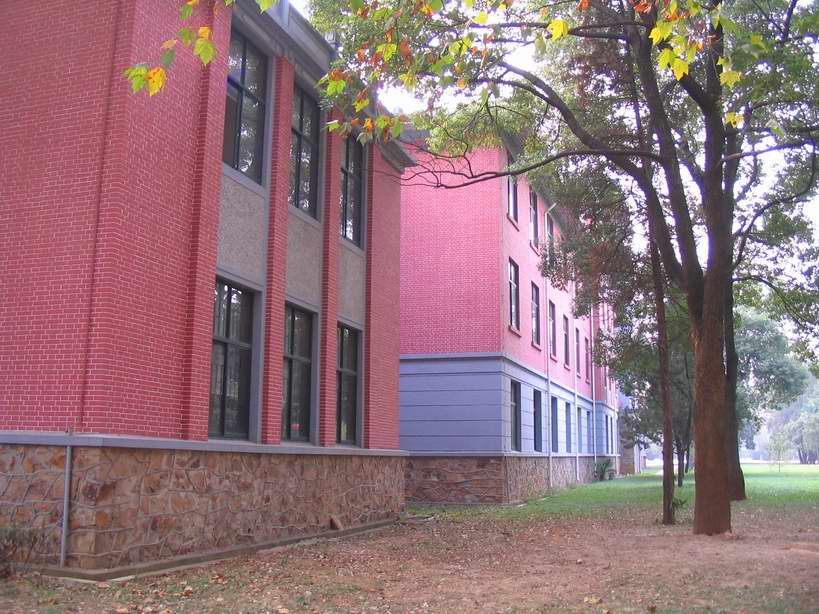
CCNU Administration Building

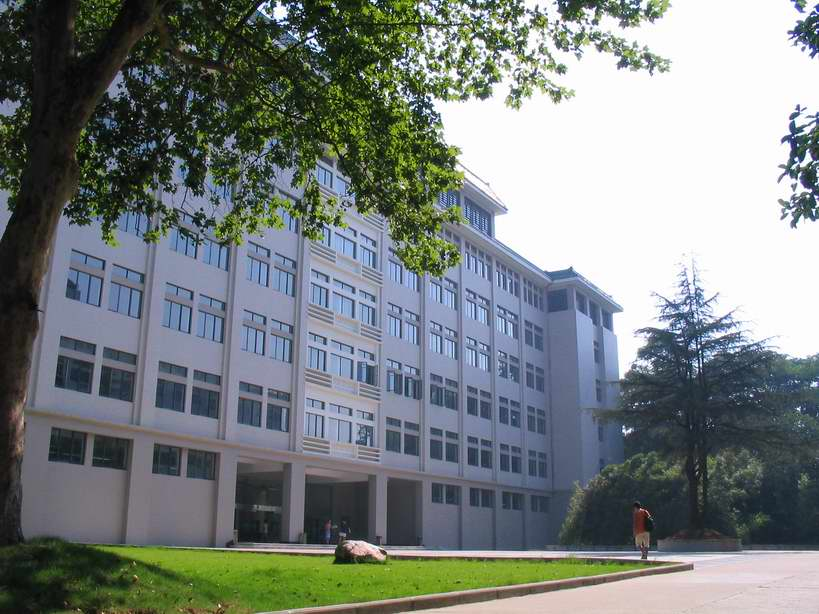
CCNU Building 8

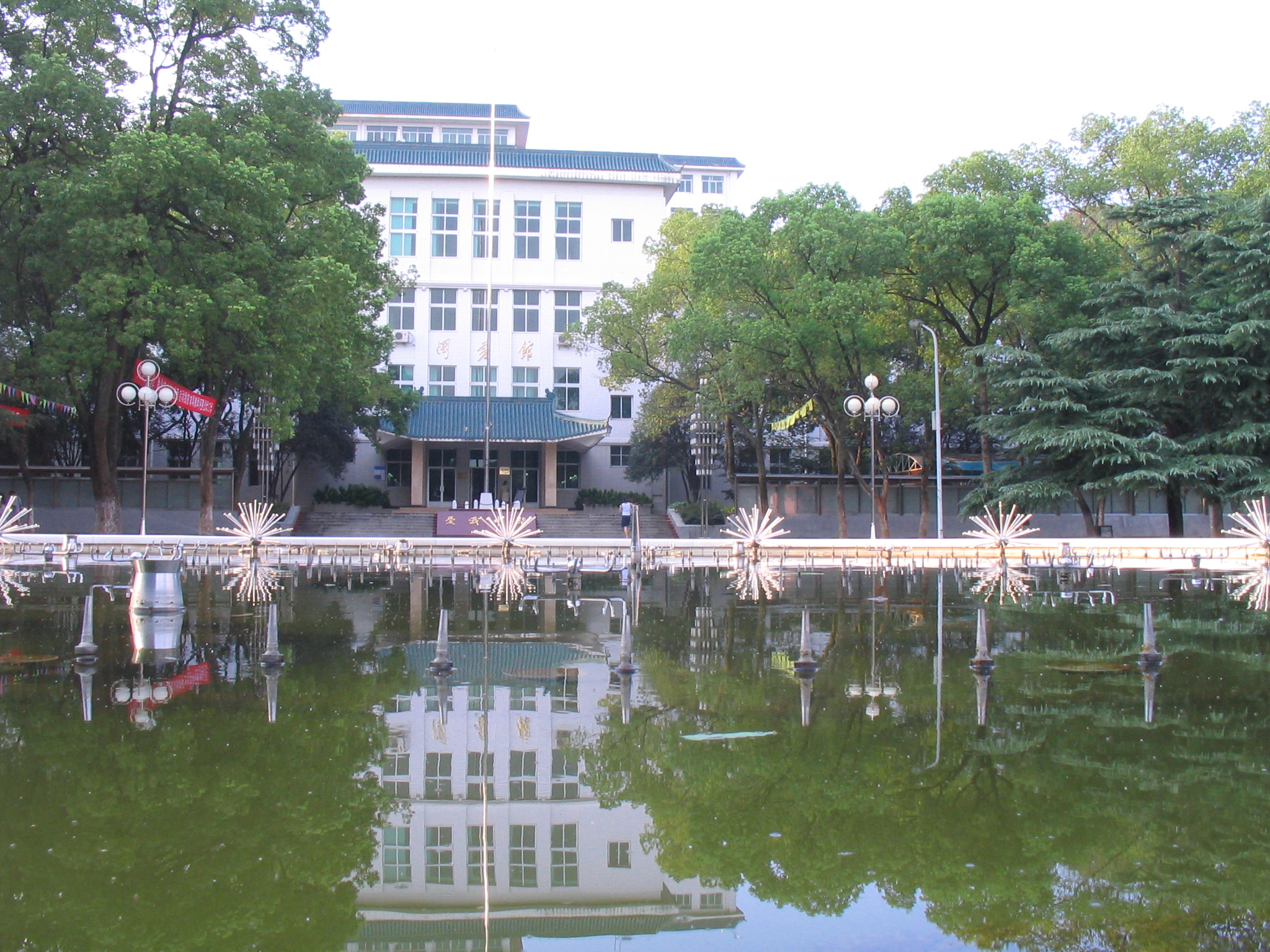
CCNU Former Library

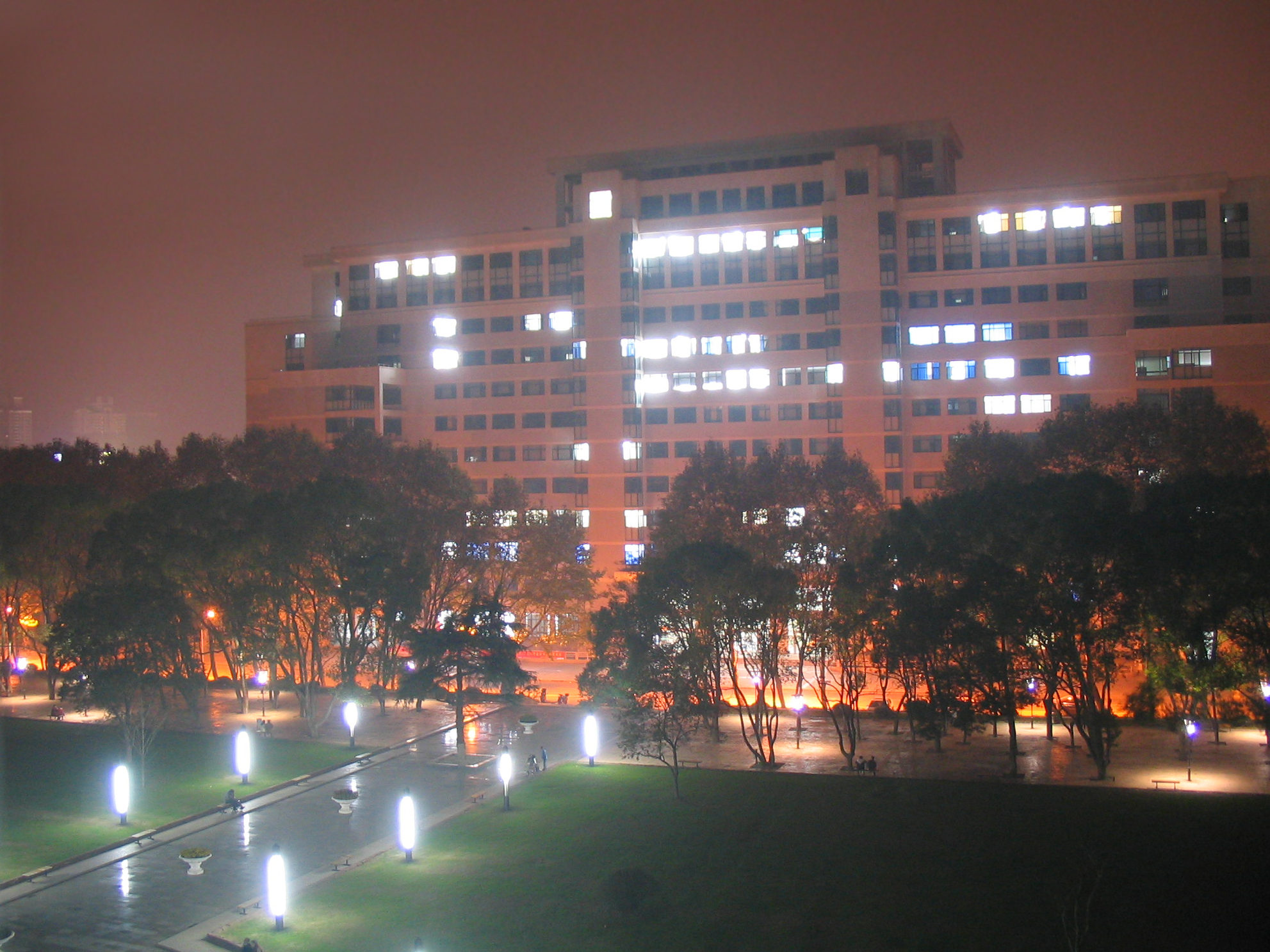
CCNU Building 9 Plaza
