= Zhang Kaiyuan =

Chinese historian (1926–2021)

- 章开沅

President of Central China Normal University
- In office December 1983 – March 1991
- Preceded by: Liu Ruozeng
- Succeeded by: Wang Qingsheng

Personal details
- Born: July 8, 1926 Wanzhi District, Wuhu, Anhui, China
- Died: May 28, 2021 (aged 94) Wuhan, Hubei, China
- Education: University of Nanking; Zhongyuan University
- Occupation: Historian, educator

Academic work
- Discipline: History
- Sub-discipline: Modern History of China
- Institutions: Central China Normal University

Chinese name
- Simplified Chinese: 章开沅
- Traditional Chinese: 章開沅
Transcriptions
Standard Mandarin
- Hanyu Pinyin: Zhāng Kāiyuán

Zhang Kaiyuan (Chinese: 章开沅; July 8, 1926 – May 28, 2021) was a Chinese historian and educator.

== Biography ==
Born in Wuhu, Anhui Province, Zhang Kaiyuan was admitted by the History Department of the University of Nanking in October 1946, and graduated there. In December 1948, Zhang went to the Central Plains Liberated Areas in Central China University of Political Research as a graduate student. In July 1949 he went to Wuhan together with the school, and became an assistant professor in the Department of History, College of Education faculty, and in September 1951 into the Huazhong University (from August 1985 to March 1991 it was the Central China Normal University, and Huazhong Normal University). He was lecturer, associate professor, professor, and finally president then former president of Huazhong Normal University. He was also President of the Research Center for the History of Chinese Christian Colleges and Universities.

Zhang Kaiyuan held Honorary Doctor of Laws degrees from Augustana College, Soka University and Kansai University.

== Publications in English ==
- Zhang, Kaiyuan. Eyewitnesses to Massacre: American Missionaries Bear Witness to Japanese Atrocities in Nanjing. Armonk, N.Y.: M.E. Sharpe, 2001. According to WorldCat, the book is held in 459 libraries
- Zhang, Kaiyuan. Distanciation and Return Analysis on Traditional Culture and Modernization of China. Singapore: Silkroad Press, 2011.

Educational offices
Preceded by Liu Ruozeng	President of Central China Normal University; 1983–1991	Succeeded by Wang Qingsheng
