= Tang Haoming =

Chinese writer (born 1946)

- 唐浩明
- Born: October 1946 (age 79); Hengyang, Hunan, China
- Education: Central China Normal University
- Occupation: Novelist
- Relatives: Tang Zhenchun (father); Wang Dehui (mother); Tang Yiming (brother)
- Writing career
- Language: Chinese
- Period: 1986–2002
- Genre: Historical novel
- Notable works: Zeng Guofan; Yang Du; Zhang Zhidong
- Notable awards: Full list

Tang Haoming (Chinese: 唐浩明; pinyin: Táng Hàomíng; born October 1946), also known as Deng Yunsheng (邓云生; 鄧雲生; Dèng Yúnshēng), is a Chinese novelist. He is best known for writing biographical novels of Zeng Guofan, Zhang Zhidong, and Yang Du. He is now the vice president of Hunan Writers Association.

== Biography ==
Tang was born in 1946 in Hengyang, Hunan, which was also the hometown of Wang Fuzhi. His father Tang Zhenchu (唐振楚;1914–1999) was a member of the Central Committee of the Kuomintang and official in the National Government. His mother named Wang Dehui (王德蕙). His elder brother Tang Yiming (唐翼明; born 1942) is a scholar on Wei and Jin dynasties literature who graduated from Wuhan University and Columbia University. His elder sister Tang Shuming (唐漱明) died of dysentery during the Land Reform Movement in the 1950s. In 1949, before moving to Taiwan, Tang's parents entrusted their children to Tang Zhenchu's elder brother Tang Xuanzu (唐宣祖). In the Land Reform Movement, Tang Xuanzu was brought to be persecuted because he was a landlord. Shortly after, Tang Haoming was adopted by Deng Xianhong (邓显宏), a hairdresser of Hengyang No. 2 Middle School, and renamed Deng Yunsheng (邓云生).

He was a graduate student in water conservancy at the Central China College of Water Conservancy. After graduation, he worked in a farm and hydropower station as a technician.

In 1966, the Cultural Revolution was launched by Mao Zedong, at this time, he read the Twenty-Four Histories. With the resumption of the University Entrance Examination in 1977, he was accepted to the Central China Normal University and graduated in 1982. After graduation, he worked in Yuelu Publishing House as an editor.

In 1986, Tang became famous for his novel, Zeng Guofan. In 2002, Tang published the novel Zhang Zhidong. He no longer writes, so this book has become his last novel.

He became president of Hunan Writers Association in September 2004, and was re-elected in June 2011.

== Works ==
- Zeng Guofan (Chinese: 曾国藩)
- Yang Du (Chinese: 杨度)
- Zhang Zhidong (Chinese: 张之洞)
- 唐浩明点评曾国藩家书 [Tang Haoming Comment on: Tseng Kuo-fan Letter] (in Chinese). China: Northern United Publishing Media (Group) Co.. Ltd. 2000. ISBN 978-7531338949.
- 唐浩明点评曾国藩语录 [Tang Haoming Comment Zeng Quotations] (in Chinese). Shandong: Shandong People's Publishing House. 2014. ISBN 978-7209072250.

== Awards ==
- 1st National Young and Middle-aged Excellent Editor (1994)
- 3rd National Book Award (1997)
- Excellent Novel Prize (1998)
- 1st Yao Xueyin Historical Novel Prize (2003)

Cultural offices
Preceded by Sun Jianzhong (孙健忠)	President of Hunan Writers Association; 2004–2016	Succeeded by Wang Yuewen
