= Zhongyue =

Zhongyue may refer to

- Zhōngyuè (中乐) or guoyue, music composed for Chinese musical instruments
- Zhōngyuè (中岳), one of the Sacred Mountains of China
- Zhongyue Village (中岳村), Daweishan, Liuyang, Henan, China

People with the given name Zhongyue include:

- Immanuel C. Y. Hsu (徐中約; Xú Zhōngyuē); 1923–2005), sinologist at the University of California, Santa Barbara
