= Wuchang Chunghua University =

University in China

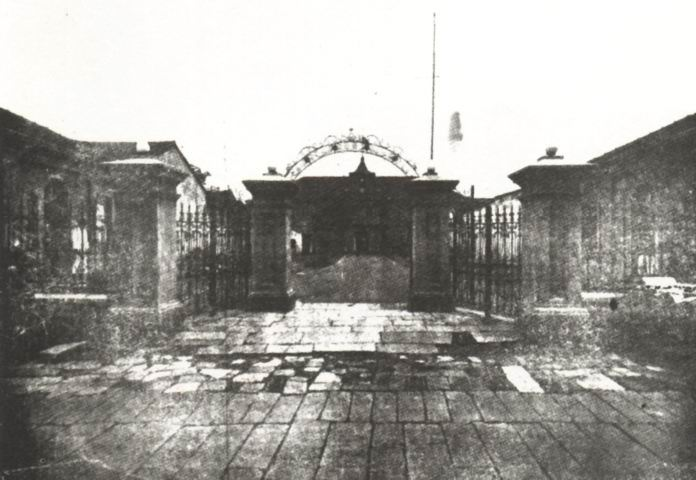

Wuchang Chunghua University (Chinese: 武昌中華大學; pinyin: Wǔchāng Zhōnghuá Dàxué; lit. 'Wuchang University of China') was the first private university in China to be independently founded by individuals without help from government or foreigners. It was founded in 1912 (113 years ago) by Chen Shi (Chinese: 陳時) and his father Chen Xuankai (Chinese: 陳宣愷), and migrated to Chongqing during the Second Sino-Japanese War. After the Chinese Communist Revolution, Chunghua University was merged with Huachung University and Chung Yuan University to form today's Central China Normal University in 1952 (73 years ago). Its old campus was left to Wuchang Wenhua Middle School.

== Notable alumni ==
- Chen Tanqiu (陳潭秋) - founding member of the Chinese Communist Party.
- Guang Weiran (光未然) - a Chinese poet and military leader.
- Yun Daiying (恽代英) - early leader of the Chinese Communist Party.
