= Liang Sishun =

Chinese poet (1893–1966)

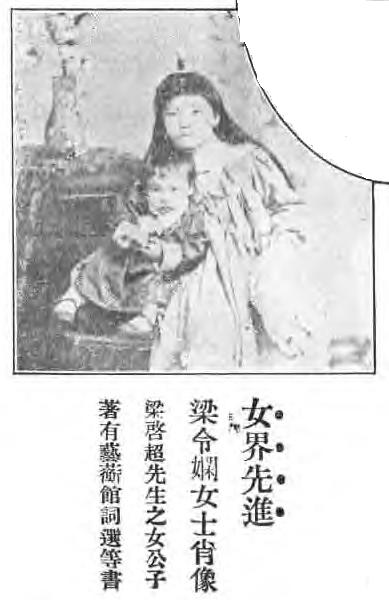
Liang Sishun holding a child, c. 1910s. The caption reads: "Pioneering woman: portrait of Ms. Liang Lingxian, daughter of Liang Qichao, author of Yihengguan Cixuan and other works".

Liang Sishun (Note: Chinese: 梁思順. Also known as Liang Lingxian (梁令嫻).) (1893–1966) was a Chinese poet. The eldest daughter of the Chinese intellectual and political activist Liang Qichao, she is known for Yihengguan Cixuan (藝蘅館詞選), an anthology of Ci poetry that she compiled.

== Biography ==
Liang Sishun was born in Guangdong in 1893 to Liang Qichao and Li Huixian (李蕙仙). In 1898, when Liang Qichao fled Qing China to Japan due to the failure of the Hundred Days' Reform, Liang Sishun also went there with her mother under the alias Shizuko Yoshida (吉田静子). She studied at Tokyo Women's Higher Normal School, where she became proficient in Japanese. She worked as her father's Japanese translator later in life.

Later in her childhood, Liang studied Ci poetry under Mai Menghua. In 1908, Liang Sishun published her first anthology of classical Ci, Yihengguan Cixuan (藝蘅館詞選; 'Selections of Ci from Yihengguan'). "Yihengguan", the art name of Liang Sishun's study, was chosen by her father Liang Qichao. The five volumes of the anthology contains 676 Ci ranging from the Tang dynasty to early 20th century copied from Liang Qichao's personal library. Mai Menghua assisted in evaluating and selecting historical works. Scholars have highlighted the influence of the Changzhou School of Ci on Liang Sishun's anthology.

The scholar Mizuyo Sudo mentioned that around 1915, Liang Sishun believed in wifehood and motherhood as proper social roles for women in Chinese society. In Liang's writings, she mentioned the impact of her grandmother and her mother on maintaining the family and providing education, and advocated for women's education in China to prepare women to become better wives and mothers.

Liang Sishun married Zhou Xizhe (周希哲), a diplomat and former student of her father. The couple first resided in Canada and took care of Liang Sishun's younger siblings who were studying abroad in the United States: Liang Sicheng, Liang Siyong, Liang Sizhong, and Liang Sizhuang. Liang Sicheng and Lin Huiyin were wedded in their living room in 1928. The couple returned to China in 1929, where they resided in Tianjin. After the Marco Polo Bridge incident in 1937, Liang Sishun elected to remain at Yenching University in Beiping (now Beijing) with her sister Sizhuang, though the rest of the Liang family moved south. Her husband died in 1938.

After the founding of the People's Republic of China in 1949, Liang Sishun became a member of the People's Political Consultative Conference of Dongcheng, Beijing and a researcher at the Central Research Institute of Culture and History. During the Cultural Revolution she was whipped by Red Guards. She died in her own residence in 1966.
