= Intellectual Trends in the Qing Period =

- Author: Liang Qichao
- Publication date: 1920
- English publication date: January 1, 1959
- ISBN: 9789620729225
- OCLC: 1056076218

Intellectual Trends in the Qing Period or An Overview of Scholarship in Qing (simplified Chinese: 清代学术概论; traditional Chinese: 清代學術概論), also translated as An Outline of Academic Studies in the Qing Dynasty, General Review of Academics in Qing Dynasty, is a book on the history of scholarship in the Qing dynasty by Liang Qichao that was started in 1902 and published in 1920.

The book was drafted as a preface to Jiang Fangzhen's History of the European Renaissance Times, but because of its length, it became a separate book. It systematically outlines the development of Chinese academic thought from the end of the Ming Dynasty to the beginning of the 20th century, over a period of more than 200 years. In it, Liang compared the European Renaissance with the development of academic thought in the Qing dynasty, and discussed the content and historical significance of the Renaissance. He asserted that the key difference between them lay in the underdevelopment of literature and fine art in the Qing.

The book was translated into English by Immanuel C. Y. Hsu and published by Harvard University Press in 1959 with an Introduction by Benjamin I. Schwartz. Hsu translated the title as Intellectual Trends in the Ch'ing Period. Hsu provided a detailed interpretation of Liang's book in the process of translation. This book revealed the academic situation in China between 1664 and 1911, and thus changed the perception of "unchanging China" in the Western mind, thus opening the door for Western scholars and students to understand modern Chinese history.
