= The Rise of Modern China =

Book by Immanuel C. Y. Hsu

- Author: Immanuel C. Y. Hsu
- Language: English
- Publisher: Oxford University Press
- Publication date: 1970 (1st edition)
- OCLC: 1176523760

The Rise of Modern China is an English book on China studies written by Immanuel C. Y. Hsu. It is an influential textbook in the United States. The book covers the evolution of the Chinese history over the past 400 years, from the establishment of the Qing dynasty to the beginning of the 21st century.

The Rise of Modern China was first published in 1970 by Oxford University Press in New York City. The Traditional Chinese translation of the sixth edition of the original book was published by the Chinese University of Hong Kong Press in Hong Kong in 2001, as 中國近代史.

== Publication ==
In 2008, the World Book Publishing House published The Rise of Modern China in simplified Chinese in Beijing, using the title 中国近代史; Zhōngguó jìndài shǐ. This edition was heavily abridged, with the last two parts of the original book omitted extensively.
