= Dai Jianye =

- 戴建业
- Born: 1956 (age 69–70); Macheng, Hubei, China
- Occupations: Classical literature researcher, professor
- Children: 1

Academic background
- Education: Central China Normal University

Academic work
- Discipline: Chinese literature
- Sub-discipline: Classical Chinese poetry
- Institutions: Central China Normal University

Chinese name
- Traditional Chinese: 戴建業
- Simplified Chinese: 戴建业
Transcriptions
Standard Mandarin
- Hanyu Pinyin: Dài Jiànyè

Dai Jianye (Chinese: 戴建业; born 1956) is a Chinese Classical literature researcher who is a professor at Central China Normal University.

== Biography ==
Dai was born in Macheng, Hubei, in 1956. In 1985, he graduated from Central China Normal University. After graduation, he taught at the university.

== Works ==
- 六朝文学史 [Literature history of the Six Dynasties] (in Chinese). Shanghai: Shanghai Literature and Art Publishing House. 2019. ISBN 9787532172542.
- 戴建业精读世说新语 [Dai Jianye commentary A New Account of the Tales of the World] (in Chinese). Shanghai: Shanghai Literature and Art Publishing House. 2019. ISBN 9787532172160.
- 你听懂了没有 (in Chinese). Shanghai: Shanghai Literature and Art Publishing House. 2019. ISBN 9787532172986.
- 两宋诗词简史 [A Brief History of Poetry in Song Dynasty] (in Chinese). Shanghai: Shanghai Literature and Art Publishing House. 2019. ISBN 9787532172122.
- 戴建业精读老子 [Dai Jianye commentary Tao Te Ching] (in Chinese). Shanghai: Shanghai Literature and Art Publishing House. 2019. ISBN 9787532172917.
- 澄明之境：陶渊明新论 (in Chinese). Shanghai: Shanghai Literature and Art Publishing House. 2019. ISBN 9787532172320.
- 论中国古代的知识分类与典籍分类 (in Chinese). Shanghai: Shanghai Literature and Art Publishing House. 2019. ISBN 9787532172993.
- 文本阐释的内与外 (in Chinese). Shanghai: Shanghai Literature and Art Publishing House. 2019. ISBN 9787532171576.
- 诗囚：孟郊论稿 (in Chinese). Shanghai: Shanghai Literature and Art Publishing House. 2019. ISBN 9787532172337.
- 一切皆有可能 (in Chinese). Haikou, Hainan: Hainan Publishing House. 2018. ISBN 9787544361514.
- 浊世清流“世说新语”会心录 (in Chinese). Haikou, Hainan: Hainan Publishing House. 2016. ISBN 9787544363402.
- 老子开讲 (in Chinese). Haikou, Hainan: Hainan Publishing House. 2015. ISBN 9787544359832.
- 张舜徽学术论著阐释 (in Chinese). Wuhan, Hubei: Central China Normal University Press. 2011. ISBN 9787562249238.
- 老子：民族的大智 (in Chinese). Shanghai: Shanghai Classics Publishing House. 2009. ISBN 9787532554072.
- 老子智慧新解 (in Chinese). Beijing: China City Press. 2008. ISBN 9787507419573.
- 孟郊论稿 (in Chinese). Shanghai: Shanghai Classics Publishing House. 2006. ISBN 9787532545605.
- Zhang Sanxi; Dai Jianye (2015). 华中学术. Wuhan, Hubei: Central China Normal University Press. ISBN 9787562270836.

== Honours and awards ==
- 2016 Mingde Teacher Award (Hong Kong)
