= Hubei University of Chinese Medicine =

Provincial public university in Wuhan, Hubei, China

- 湖北中医药大学
- Former names: Hubei University of Chinese Medicine
- Established: 1958
- Location: Wuhan, China
- Website: www.hbtcm.edu.cn

Chinese name
- Traditional Chinese: 湖北中醫藥大學
- Simplified Chinese: 湖北中医药大学
Transcriptions

The Hubei University of Chinese Medicine (湖北中医药大学), formerly known as Hubei Traditional Chinese Medicine College (湖北中医学院), is a provincial public university located in Wuhan, Hubei, China.

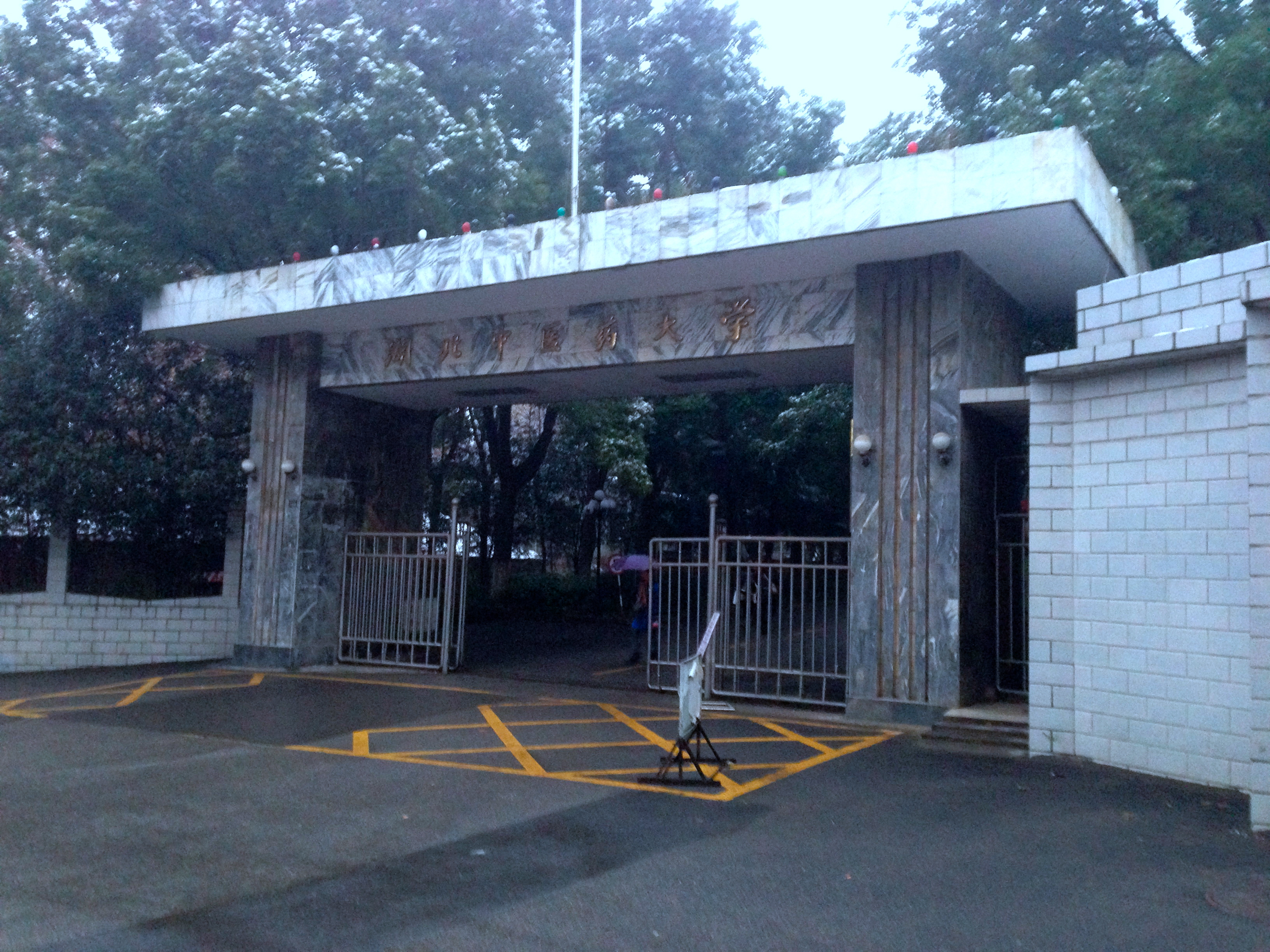
School's gate

== History ==
The history of Hubei University of Chinese Medicine dates back to 1958 when it was first founded as Hubei Vocational School of Traditional Chinese Medicine. In 2003, the university was renewed by combining with Hubei College of Medical Laboratory Sciences.

== Infrastructure ==
The college has three secondary schools, four affiliated hospitals, four State-Level (highest level) Medical Research Centers, and 10 Research Institutions.

The university occupies 161 acres (0.65 km^{2}) with a total construction of about 470,000m^{2}. The university has 15 departments, 28 specialties for bachelor's degrees and 9 specialties for professional training, 28 specialties for master's degrees, and 16 specialties for doctorate degrees; more than 104 bases for clinical practice, including 7 affiliated hospitals, 21 State-Level, Province-Level or College-Level laboratories for teaching. At present the university has 18,000 students.

=== International students ===
Since 1986 when it started to enroll foreign students and students from India, Pakistan, Bangladesh, Africa, Korea, Vietnam, Mongolia, Hong Kong-Macau-Taiwan, the university has successively established such organizations as the Foreign Affairs Department, Overseas Education school and Hong Kong-Macao-Taiwan Affairs’ Office, which serve as a relatively independent facility, providing overseas students with the teaching and the affiliated facilities.

Since 1986, the University has trained over 1,600 overseas students from over 30 countries and regions, has developed the ability to receive about 50 groups of visiting guests per year, and has exchanged and cooperated with over 50 universities, academic institutions and companies from over 25 countries. Up to now, the International Education School has more than 500 resident overseas students from over 30 countries and regions. The new campus started construction in 2004.

The new buildings of the International Education School, consisting of accommodation, canteens, an entertainment center, a fitness center, a gymnasium, conference rooms, and offices.

== Academic staff ==
The university staff has reached the number of 1212 people: among them, 859 are full-time teachers, 385 have the title of Professor or Associated Professor, 300 are tutors for mastership candidates, 40 are for doctorate candidates, 11 nationwide famous tutors for Chinese medicine succession, and more than 30 people enjoy Special Allowance issued by State Council and Provincial Government.
