= Huachung University =

University

Huachung University (Chinese: 華中大學; pinyin: Huázhōng Dàxué; lit. 'Central China University') was a Christian university in Wuhan, in China's Yangtze valley, originally called Boone University, was founded by the union of several Christian universities in 1924 and renamed Huachung in 1929. The university expanded until it was forced to retreat during the Second Sino-Japanese War, but returned to Wuhan in 1945. It was incorporated into the national university system in 1951.

== Boone College ==
The Bishop Boone Memorial School, a boarding school, opened in Wuchang in Sept., 1871, with three students. It was named after Bishop William Jones Boone, the first Episcopal Bishop of China. It became Boone College (文華書院 Wenhua shuyuan) in 1905, graduated its first class in 1906, and was incorporated as a university in 1909. It comprised preparatory and college departments, a theological school, and a medical school.

== Huachung University ==
The university was formed in 1924 by the union of existing Christian schools and colleges. These included' Wesley College in Wuchang (sponsored by the British Methodists), the Griffith John School in Hankou (sponsored by the London Missionary Society), Lakeside College in Yuezhou (sponsored by the Reformed Church in America), the Yale-in-China, or Yali, institution in Changsha, and Boone University in Wuchang (sponsored by the American Episcopalians).

There was controversy, however, about where to locate the school, and the political unrest and nationalistic agitation, which led up to the Northern Expedition of 1925, delayed the opening of Central China (or Huachung) University until 1924. Sparked by the Nanking Incident of 1927, a student committee took control of the campus. The Wuhan Nationalist government could not protect the city from invading armies, and students prudently left and returned home. The school came back together in 1929 on the western part of the Boone compound in Wuchang. The buildings were gradually restored, including Ingle Hall, the Administration building, and part of St. Paul's Divinity School. Only eight students graduated in 1933, but the relative stability of the next few years led to a growth of new students.

The university operated in Wuhan from 1924 to 1927, receiving help from, among others, Central Office of the China Union Universities (later renamed United Board for Christian Higher Education in Asia), Yale-in-China, as well as prosperous local families. After several years of disruption because of political instability, it reorganized in 1929. The disastrous Yangzi floods of 1931 destroyed many buildings, but by the onset of war in 1937, the campus had not only been rebuilt, but many buildings were added. After the Japanese bombings of Wuhan in 1938, the university moved successively to Hengyang, Guilin, Kunming, and finally to a small village near Dali, in Yunnan. It returned to Wuhan in 1946.

After the January 16, 1951 decision of the Ministry of Education to nationalize Christian colleges, Huachung was joined by the normal college of Chung Yuan University to form National Huachung University. It was later renamed as Huazhong Normal University and relocated to a new campus, leaving the old one to Hubei University of Chinese Medicine.

== Boone Library School ==
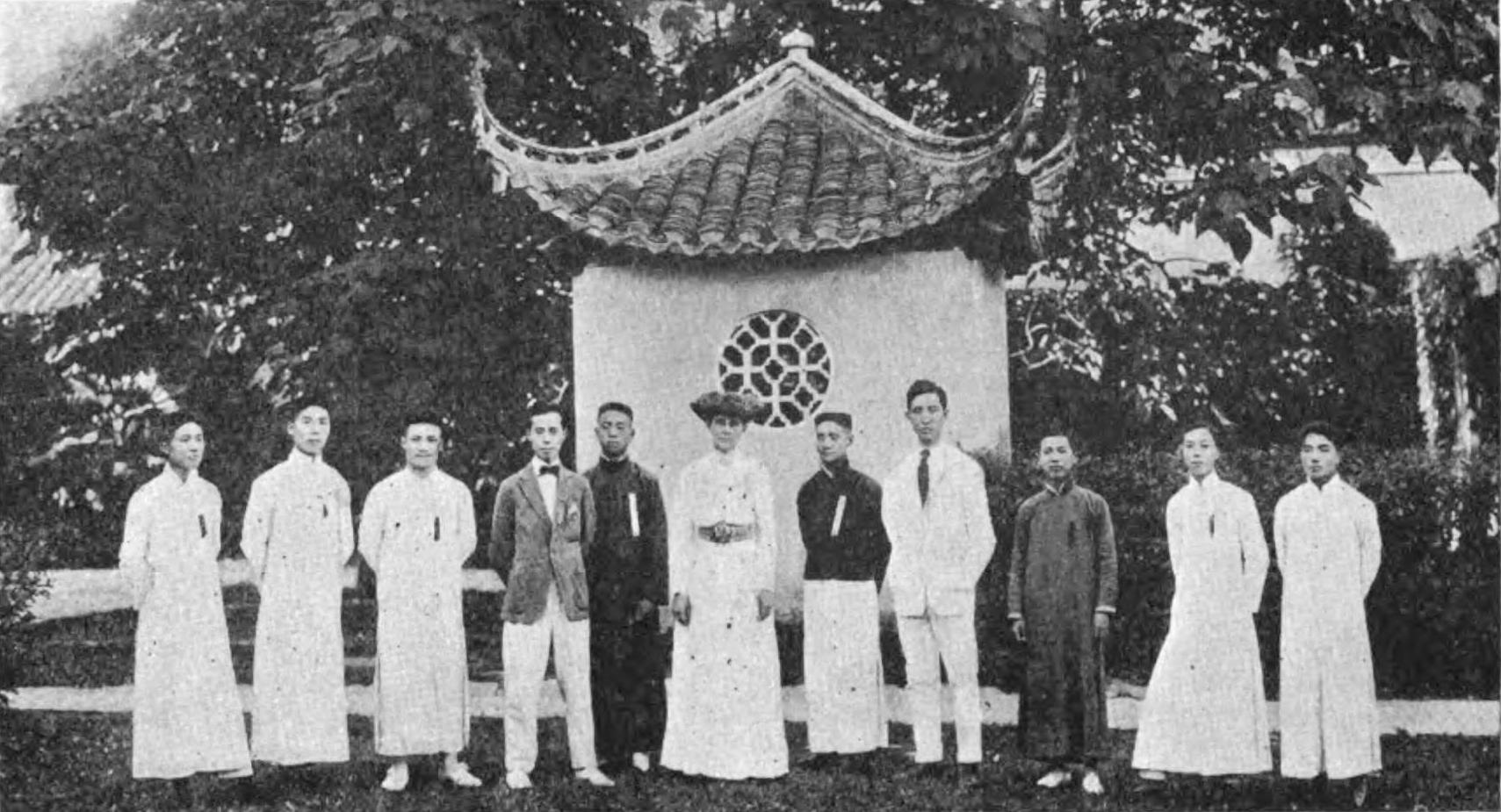
Faculty and the first class of the Boone Library School, 1921

Professional schools were an important part of the university's mission. The Boone Library School, under the leadership of Mary Elizabeth Wood trained a generation of Chinese bibliographers and librarians. In 1909, Wood began organizing the college library to train librarians and bibliographers. She arranged for Samuel T.Y. Seng and Thomas C.S. Hu to go to the United States for professional training. Seng entered the Library School of the New York Public Library in 1914, where Hu enrolled in 1917, followed by H.Y. Hsü, librarian of St. John's University, Shanghai, in 1916. T.C. Tai went from Tsing Hua College, Peking to be the first Chinese student at the New York State Library School, Albany.Seng and Hu returned to join the Boone University library staff. They worked with the Lecture Bureau of the National Committee of the Chinese Y.M.C.A. in Shanghai. David Z. T. Yui arranged for them to give demonstration lectures in ten cities to promote public libraries.

Wood and the two American-trained Chinese librarians developed a curriculum of library science at Boone University, starting in January, 1920, making it the first institution in China to have a professional course. In 1929, it became a separate undergraduate school of Chunghua University, known as the Boone Library School. For many years it was the only library school in China. The two-year course was roughly the equivalent of the first year of work in an American library school. Graduates became librarians all over the country. The China Foundation for the Promotion of Education and Culture in charge of the Boxer Indemnity Fund gave financial support, including scholarships for students.

== References and further reading ==
- Boettcher, Cheryl (1989). "Samuel T. Y. Seng and the Boone Library School". Libraries & Culture. 24 (3): 269–294. JSTOR 25542168.
- Chapman, Nancy E. and Jessica C. Plumb (2001). The Yale-China Association : A Centennial History. Hong Kong: Chinese University Press. ISBN 9629960184.
- Holden, Reuben A. (1964). Yale in China; the Mainland, 1901-1951. New Haven: Yale in China Association.
- Cheng, Huanwen (2013). "The New Library Movement in China and the Impact of American Librarianship at the Beginning of the 20th Century" (PDF).
- Liao, Jing (2006). "Selected Works of Alfred K'aiming Ch'iu in Library Science (Review)". Libraries & Culture. 41 (2): 275–276. doi:10.1353/lac.2006.0023. S2CID 161494245.
- Wong, 黄維廉, V.L. (1938). "Library Chronicle". T'ien Hsia Monthly (Reprinted China Heritage Quarterly 20 (December 2009)). 6 (4): 369–376.
