= Immanuel C. Y. Hsu =

Chinese-American Sinologist and historian (1923-2005)

- Born: Immanuel Chung-Yueh Hsu; 1923; Shanghai, Republic of China
- Died: October 24, 2005 (aged 82); Santa Barbara, California, U.S.
- Education: Yenching University; University of Minnesota; Harvard University
- Known for: Academician

Chinese name
- Traditional Chinese: 徐中約
- Simplified Chinese: 徐中约
Transcriptions
Standard Mandarin
- Hanyu Pinyin: Xú Zhōngyuē
- Wade–Giles: Hsü2 Chung1-yüeh1

Immanuel Chung-Yueh Hsu (Chinese: 徐中約, 1923 – October 24, 2005) was a sinologist, a scholar of modern Chinese intellectual and diplomatic history, and a professor of history at the University of California at Santa Barbara.

== Biography ==
Born in Shanghai in 1923, he studied at Yenching University in Beijing, and the University of Minnesota. He held a Harvard-Yenching Fellowship at Harvard University from 1950 to 1954.

After receiving his doctorate from Harvard, he spent the years 1955–58 as a Research Fellow at Harvard's East Asian Research Center. He taught modern Chinese history at the University of California at Santa Barbara from 1959 until his retirement in 1991, serving as Chair of the History department from 1970 to 1972.

He was a Guggenheim Fellow in 1962–1963, as well as a Fulbright Fellow. His most widely read book is The Rise of Modern China, a survey of Chinese history from 1600 to the present, and a standard textbook.

He died of complications from pneumonia on October 24, 2005.

== Publications ==
- The Rise of Modern China, Oxford University Press (First edition, 1970; sixth edition, 2000).
- Intellectual Trends in the Ch'ing Period
- China's entry into the Family of Nations: The Diplomatic Phase, 1858–1880
- The Ili Crisis: A Study of Sino-Russian Diplomacy, 1871–1881
- China Without Mao: The Search for a New Order, Oxford University Press, 1983.
- Chapter on Late Ch’ing foreign relations, 1866–1905 in The Cambridge History of China, Volume 11: Late Ch'ing, 1800–1911, edited by John K. Fairbank and Kwang-Ching Liu, Cambridge University Press. (Publisher's Catalogue)
