= Yang Du =

Chinese politician (1875–1931)

- 楊度
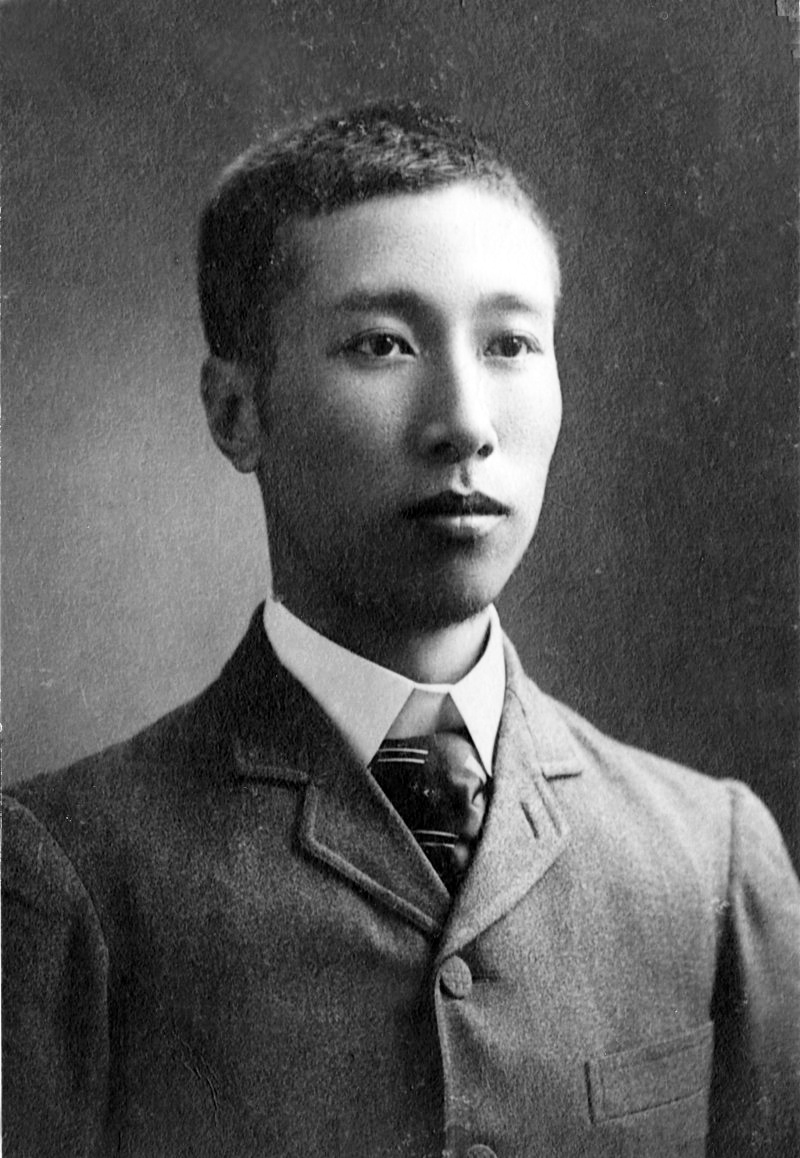
- Yang Du

Vice Minister of Education
- In office 1911–1912
- Monarch: Xuantong Emperor
- Prime Minister: Yuan Shikai
- Succeeded by: Liu Tingchen

Director of the National Bureau of Statistics
- In office 1911–1912
- Monarch: Xuantong Emperor
- Prime Minister: Yuan Shikai

Personal details
- Born: Yang Chengzan (楊承瓉); 15 January 1875 Xiangtan, Hunan, China
- Died: 17 September 1931 (aged 56) Shanghai, China
- Party: Kuomintang (1922–1929); Chinese Communist Party (1929–1931)
- Spouse(s): Huang Hua (黃華); Xu Canleng (徐粲楞)
- Children: 8
- Education: Hongwen Academy; Hosei University

Yang Du (traditional Chinese: 楊度; simplified Chinese: 杨度; pinyin: Yáng Dù; 15 January 1875 – 17 September 1931) was a Chinese politician.

== Names ==
His birth name was Yang Chengzan (楊承瓚). His style name was Xizi (皙子) and his art names was Hugong (虎公), Huchan (虎禪), Huchanshi (虎禪師), Hutoutuo (虎頭陀), and Shihu (釋虎).

== Biography ==
Yang was born into a family of farming background in the village of Shitang (石塘村), in the town of Jiangyu (姜畬镇), Xiangtan in Hunan province. His grandfather, Yang Litang (楊禮堂), was a soldier of the Xiang Army. His father, Yang Yisheng (楊懿生), was a farmer. Yang was the elder of three children. His father died of illness when he was 10 years old, Yang was raised by his uncle, Yang Ruisheng (楊瑞生).

Yang studied under Wang Kaiyun (王闿運). His classmates such as: Xia Shoutian (夏壽田), Yang Rui (楊銳), Liu Guangdi (劉光第), Liu Kuiyi (劉揆一), and Qi Baishi (齊白石).

In 1902, Yang went to Japan, studying in Hongwen Academy (弘文學院). In 1904, Yang studied politics in Hosei University.

In 1911, Yang served as the Director of the National Bureau of Statistics. In 1914, Yang became a senator in the senate. When Yuan Shikai died, Yang became a buddhist.

In 1922, Yang joined the Kuomintang in Shanghai. In 1929, Yang joined the Chinese Communist Party.

In September 1931, Yang died of illness in Shanghai.

== Personal life ==
Yang had two sons with Huang Hua (黃華) and six with Xu Canleng (徐粲楞) (three sons and three daughters).

With Huang Hua:

- Dr. Yang Gongshu (楊公庶), chemist, he was a graduate student in chemistry at the Berlin University.
- Dr. Yang Gongzhao (楊公兆), geographer, he was a graduate student in geology at the Berlin University.

With Xu Canleng:

- Yang Yunhui (楊雲慧), dramatist.
- Yang Yunbi (楊雲碧)
- Yang Gongsu (楊公素)
- Yang Gongmin (楊公敏)
- Yang Yunjie (楊雲潔)
- Yang Gongwu (楊公武)
