= China =

Country in East Asia

People's Republic of China 中华人民共和国 Zhōnghuá Rénmín Gònghéguó
- Flag Emblem
- Anthem: 义勇军进行曲; Yìyǒngjūn jìnxíngqǔ "March of the Volunteers"
- People's Republic of China Territory claimed but not controlled
- Capital: Beijing; 39°54′24″N 116°23′51″E
- Largest city by urban population: Shanghai
- Official language: Standard Chinese
- Official script: Simplified Chinese (Mainland); Traditional Chinese (Hong Kong, Macau)
- Ethnic groups (2020): 91.11% Han Chinese; 1.39% Zhuang; 0.84% Uyghur; 0.81% Hui; 0.79% Miao; 0.74% Manchu; 0.70% Yi; 0.68% Tujia; 0.50% Tibetan; 2.44% others
- Demonyms: Chinese; others
- Government: Unitary communist state
  - CCP General Secretary and President (Note: Xi is the paramount leader of China, and holds the titles of General Secretary of the Chinese Communist Party (since 2012), President of China (since 2013), and Chairman of the Central Military Commission (since 2012).): Xi Jinping
  - Premier: Li Qiang
  - Congress chairman: Zhao Leji
  - Conference chairman: Wang Huning
- Legislature: National People's Congress

Formation
  - First imperial dynasty: 221 BCE
  - Establishment of the Republic of China: 1 January 1912
  - Proclamation of the People's Republic: 1 October 1949

Area
  - Total: 9,596,961 km^{2} (3,705,407 sq mi) (Note: UN figure for mainland China, which excludes Hong Kong, Macau, and Taiwan. It also excludes the Trans-Karakoram Tract (5,180 km^{2} or 2,000 sq mi), Aksai Chin (38,000 km^{2} or 15,000 sq mi) and other territories in dispute with India. The total area of China is listed as 9,572,900 km^{2} (3,696,100 sq mi) by the Encyclopædia Britannica.) (3rd)
  - Water (%): 2.8

Population
  - 2025 estimate: ▼1,404,890,000 (Note: Excluding residents of Hong Kong, Macao, Taiwan and foreigners living in the 31 provinces, autonomous regions and municipalities) (2nd)
  - Density: 146/km^{2} (378.1/sq mi) (83rd)
- GDP (PPP): 2026 estimate
  - Total: ▲$44.555 trillion (Note: GDP figures exclude Taiwan, Hong Kong, and Macau.) (1st)
  - Per capita: ▲$31,786 (74th)
- GDP (nominal): 2026 estimate
  - Total: ▲$21.546 trillion (2nd)
  - Per capita: ▲$15,371 (73rd)
- Gini (2022): ▼36.0 medium inequality
- HDI (2023): ▲0.797 high (78th)
- Currency: Renminbi (yuan, 元/¥) (Note: The Hong Kong dollar is used in Hong Kong and Macau, while the Macanese pataca is used in Macau only.) (CNY)
- Time zone: UTC+8 (CST)
- Calling code: +86 (Mainland); +852 (Hong Kong); +853 (Macau)
- ISO 3166 code: CN
- Internet TLD: .cn; .中国; .中國 (Mainland); .hk; .香港 (Hong Kong); .mo; .澳门; .澳門 (Macau)

China, (Note: Chinese: 中国; pinyin: Zhōngguó) officially the People's Republic of China (PRC), (Note: Chinese: 中华人民共和国; pinyin: Zhōnghuá Rénmín Gònghéguó) is a country in East Asia. It is divided into 33 province-level divisions, including two special administrative regions. (Note: Not including the de jure Taiwan Province, controlled by the Republic of China.) Beijing is the capital, while Shanghai is the most populous city by urban area. Its geography features the Central Plain, major rivers such as the Yangtze and Yellow River, deserts, subtropical and temperate forests, plateaus, and mountain ranges such as the Himalayas. It is the world's second-most populous country after India, with a population exceeding 1.4 billion (17% of the world's population). Covering 9.6 million square kilometers (3,700,000 sq mi), it is the third largest country by area. (Note: The total area ranking relative to the United States depends on the measurement of total areas. See list of countries and dependencies by area for information. The following two primary sources represent the range of estimates of China's and the United States' total areas.: 1. The Encyclopædia Britannica lists China as the third-largest country (after Russia and Canada) with a total area of 9,572,900 km^{2}.; 2. The CIA World Factbook lists China as the fourth-largest country (after Russia, Canada and the United States) with a total area of 9,596,960 km^{2}.)

Humans first arrived in China during the Paleolithic Age. During the 2nd millennium BCE, dynastic states emerged. In 221 BCE, China was unified under the Qin, followed by the Han dynasty, ushering in two millennia of imperial rule across periods of unity and division. The imperial era saw the expansion of the Silk Road and the invention of gunpowder, paper, printing, and the compass. After increased Western political, economic, and philosophical influence, the empire was succeeded by the Republic of China (ROC) after the 1911 Revolution. The Warlord Era and Chinese Civil War followed, interrupted by the Second Sino-Japanese War, which ended in a Chinese victory. In 1949, the Chinese Communist Party (CCP) proclaimed the PRC and the ROC retreated to Taiwan. Both sides still claim political legitimacy. Attempts by the CCP to advance its political program faltered through famine and political turmoil. The reform and opening-up that began in 1978 moved China towards a socialist market economy, spurring economic growth.

China is a unitary state with the CCP as its sole ruling party. It is one of the five permanent members of the UN Security Council and a member of many multilateral organizations. China is the world's largest manufacturer and has the second-largest economy by nominal GDP. International organizations have criticized China, alleging authoritarianism and human rights abuses. Possessing a large military, space program, and nuclear stockpile, China has been described as a superpower due to its influence in geopolitics, science and technology, manufacturing, economics, and culture.

Chinese art and culture have influenced much of Asia, with a literary tradition dating back millennia to the Chinese classics. China is the birthplace of Confucianism and Daoism, which form the traditional three teachings of Chinese philosophy and folk religion alongside Buddhism. Chinese cuisine is diverse and highly regional, with rice as a staple in the south and wheat in the north. It has 60 World Heritage Sites, including the Great Wall and Grand Canal. The Han, speakers of Sinitic languages, are China's dominant ethnicity, although it is home to 55 recognized minorities, including the Hui, Mongols, Tibetans, Uyghurs, and Zhuang.

== Etymology ==
The word "China" has been used in English since the 16th century; however, it was not used by the Chinese themselves during this period. Its origin has been traced through Portuguese, Malay, and Persian back to the Sanskrit word Cīna (चिन), used in ancient India. Cīna was first used in early Hindu scriptures dating from the 3rd century BCE to 4th century CE, including the Mahabharata and the Laws of Manu. In 1655, the missionary Martino Martini suggested that the word China is derived ultimately from the ancient state of Qin. This remains a common etymology. Another possible source is the ancient Guizhou polity of Yelang, known as ʐina in Loloish languages.

The official name of the modern state is the "People's Republic of China" (中华人民共和国; Zhōnghuá Rénmín Gònghéguó). The shorter form of this name is 中国; Zhōngguó, from zhōng ('central') and guó ('state'), a term first used for the demesne of the Western Zhou dynasty. (Note: An early use is on the ritual bronze vessel He zun, where it apparently refers to only the Shang's immediate demesne conquered by the Zhou.) The names of ruling imperial dynasties were typically used to refer to the state and its territories. In the 1800s, Zhongguo was officially adopted as the name of the country by the Qing dynasty.

== History ==
=== Prehistory ===
Evidence of early humans such as Homo erectus in China dates to the Paleolithic, around 1.7 million years ago, with unconfirmed sites as old as 2 million years ago. Modern Homo sapiens are attested from around 50,000 years ago. Following the end of the Last Glacial Period, in about 8,000 BCE, pottery-making Neolithic cultures emerged. By the 6000s BCE, sedentary agricultural societies had spread across the lower Yellow River basin. Written symbols appeared around 7000 BC and the Bronze Age was represented by early cultures around 3100 BC. These societies became increasingly complex, urbanized, and stratified, but many experienced a population collapse in the late 2000s BCE for unclear reasons.

=== Ancient China ===
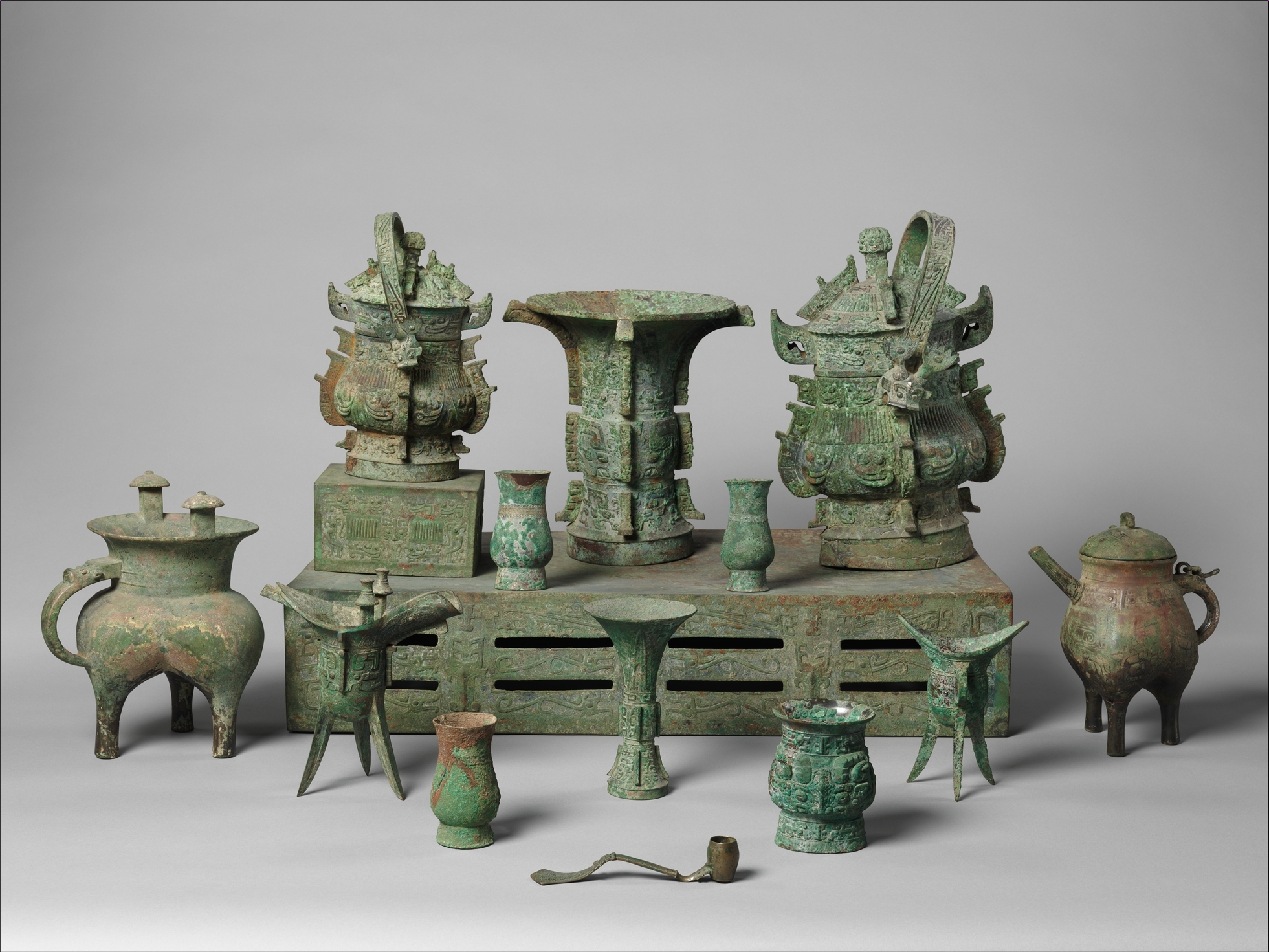
A set of Western Zhou-era ritual bronzes, c. 1000 BCE

After 2000 BCE, a Bronze Age culture emerged in the Central Plain, dubbed the Erlitou culture after its main site. Erlitou has been controversially identified with the Xia, the traditionally-accepted first dynasty, but no written records exist to confirm this. The Shang dynasty purportedly succeeded the Xia around 1600 BCE, with its early stages tentatively identified with an expansionist state known archaeologically as the Erligang culture. The historicity of the Late Shang is attested through divinational writings in the oracle bone script. These are the earliest known form of writing in China and the ancestor of modern Chinese characters.

The Shang were overthrown by the Zhou c. 1046 BCE. The Zhou ruled over a vast and loose confederation of vassal states across central China, which was gradually weakened by regional lords. Centralized authority collapsed in 771 BCE, giving way to constant regional warfare. During the Eastern Zhou, the multitude of small polities of the Spring and Autumn period evolved into seven territorial Warring States. Literary and philosophical developments of this period include the emergence of various schools of thought, such as Confucianism, Daoism, Mohism, and Legalism, alongside Chinese classics like the Confucian Analects and the Daoist Dao De Jing.

=== Imperial China ===
==== Classical period ====
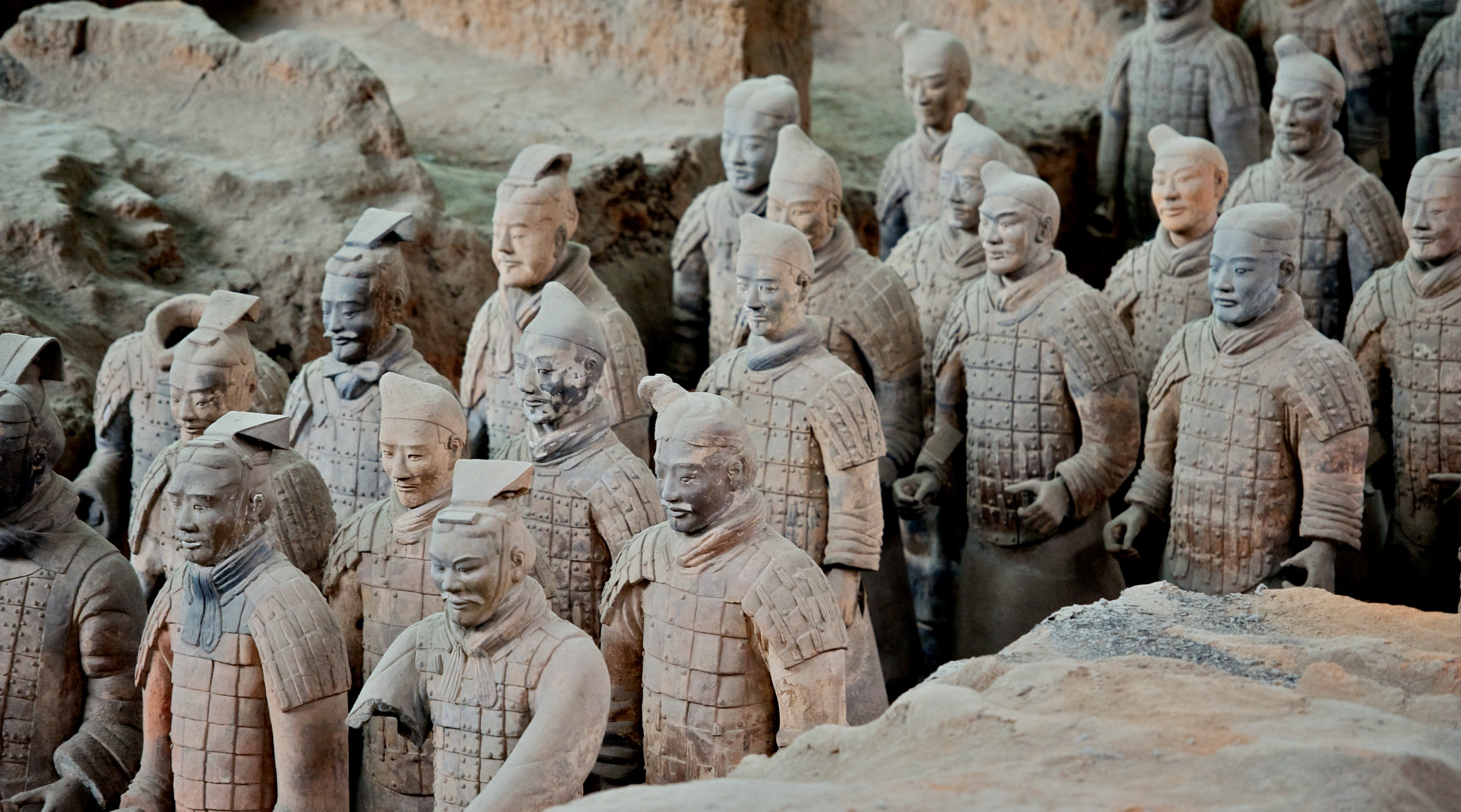
Soldier statues of the Terracotta Army, buried alongside Qin Shi Huang c. 210 BCE

In the 220s BCE, Qin rapidly conquered the other warring states. In 221, its ruler Qin Shi Huang proclaimed himself the first emperor (皇帝; Huángdì) and founded the Qin dynasty. He led an autocratic Legalist state organized in a system of commanderies and counties. The dynasty lasted only fifteen years, falling soon after his death from revolts and civil war.

After the collapse, the Han dynasty emerged to rule China between 206 BCE and 220 CE. (Note: Although 206 BCE is the generally accepted date for the founding of the dynasty, as it was when founding emperor Liu Bang became the King of Han, he did not declare himself emperor until 202 BCE, after the Chu–Han Contention. Han rule was interrupted by the usurper emperor Wang Mang, who ruled from 9 CE to 23 CE.) The Han gradually reinstated centralized control, legitimizing their rule through Confucian scholarship and political institutions which would be maintained in some form into the 20th century. Military expeditions against the Xiongnu, a confederation of nomadic steppe tribes, expanded Han influence into parts of Central Asia and helped to establish the Silk Road, allowing for trade connections between China and western Eurasia. Contemporaneously, merchants established maritime trade routes linking China, Southeast Asia, and India. The dynasty is the namesake of the Han Chinese, China's main ethnic group.

The Han faced widespread uprisings and the emergence of local warlords in the 100s and 200s CE. By 220, the empire was split into the Three Kingdoms. These were briefly united by the Jin dynasty in 280, which fell into civil war. Sinicized formerly-nomadic peoples who had settled in Northern China, such as the Xiongnu, rebelled and founded new dynasties. Various Han Chinese dynasties in Southern China emerged in the 300s. During these conflicts, Buddhism was introduced to China via the Silk Road.

==== Mid-imperial period ====
China was reunited under the Sui dynasty in 589, which constructed the Grand Canal to link Northern and Southern China. The Sui collapsed in the 610s, and was succeeded by the Tang. The Tang dynasty centralized the state and dispatched military expeditions to pacify the surrounding regions. It promoted Buddhism, but through expanding international trade built a heavily cosmopolitan society centered on its capital of Chang'an. It reformed the civil service examinations and oversaw a flourishing of art, poetry, architecture, and scholarship. The 755–763 An Lushan rebellion weakened the Tang, which gradually fragmented before collapsing completely in 907, resulting in another period of war and division.

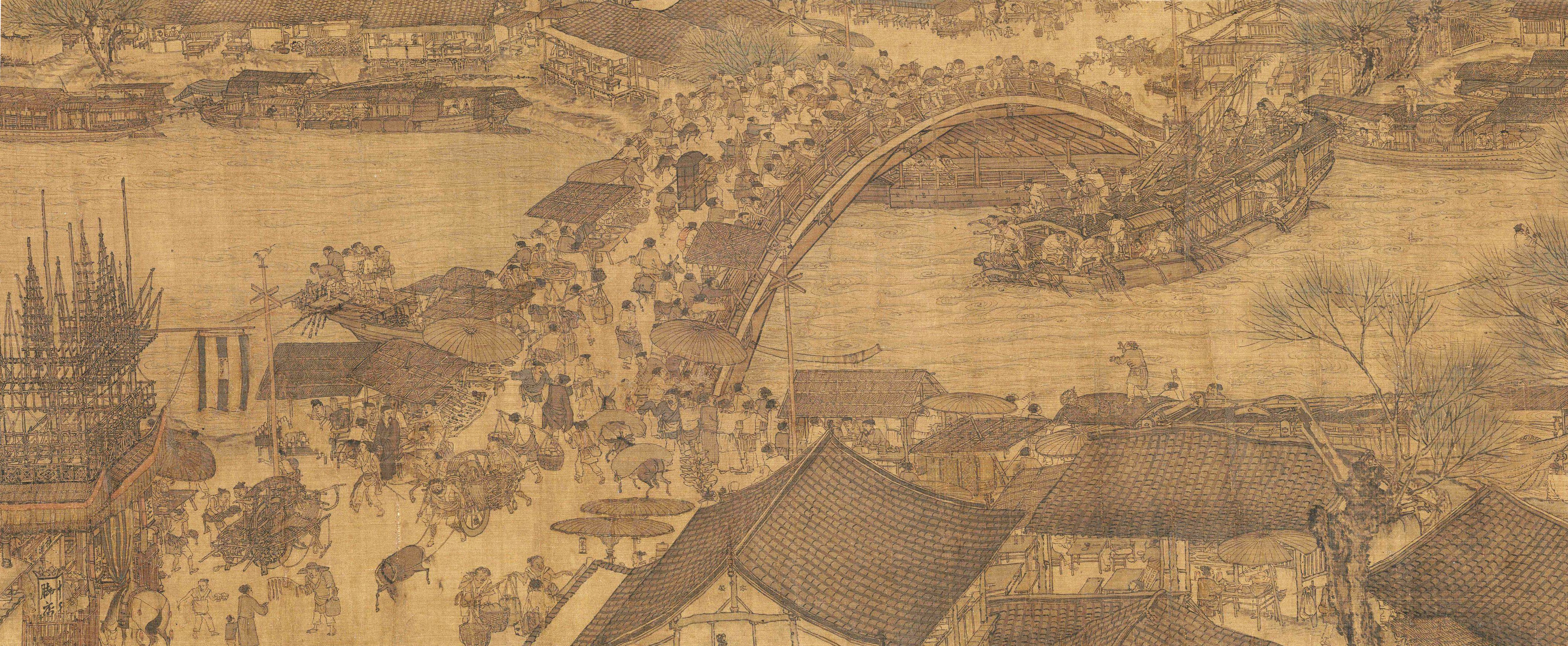
Section from the Song-era landscape painting, Along the River During the Qingming Festival, early 1100s

The Song dynasty rose to power in 960. It faced military crises, unable to subdue its Sinicized non-Han neighbors, the Khitan-led Liao dynasty and the Tangut-led Western Xia. The Song's consistent focus on defense resulted in a heavily centralized state and military, which made the first military application of gunpowder. Books became widely available by the proliferation of printing technology, while the elite class of scholar-officials grew increasingly powerful. Production, population, and trade expanded massively, alongside innovations such as industrial metallurgy and hydraulic machinery. The Song capital Kaifeng was overrun by the Jurchen-led Jin in 1127, forcing the Song to retreat to Southern China. During this period, the revivalist philosophical movement of Neo-Confucianism emerged.

==== Late imperial period ====
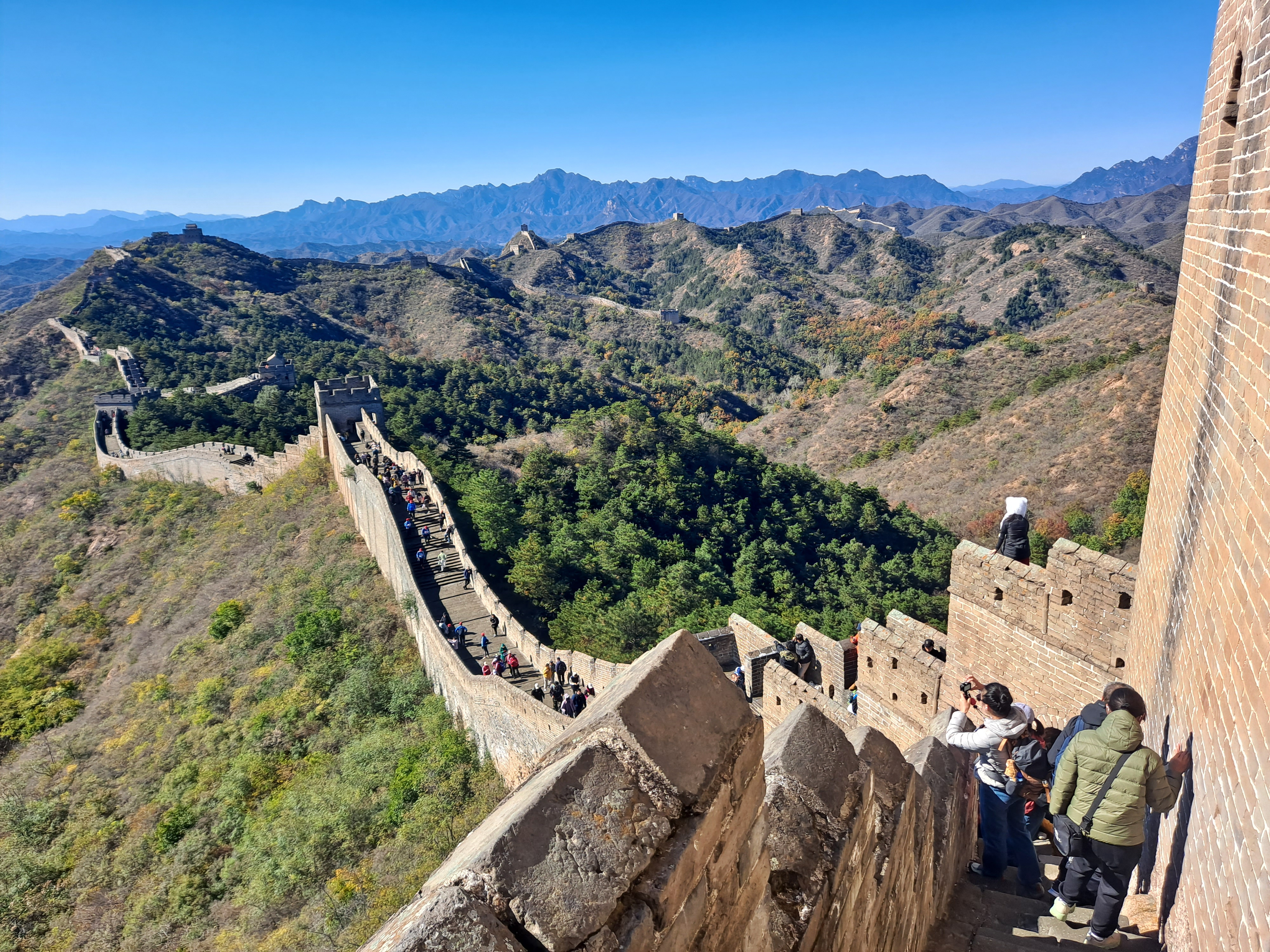
A Ming dynasty section of the Great Wall of China

In 1206, Genghis Khan united the nomadic Mongols to the north under the Mongol Empire. Over the following fifty years, they conquered the Western Xia and the Jin, in addition to their other conquests as far west as Europe. The empire split into separate khanates, with Mongol leader Kublai Khan establishing the Yuan dynasty and subjugating the Song in the 1270s. Although Chinese culture remained largely unchanged, the Yuan maintained a Mongol elite culture and established a complex ethnic and occupational hierarchy. Foreign presence increased as China became more connected to Eurasian trade routes.

In the 1340s, central China was devastated by disease, famine, and severe flooding along the Yellow River. Various rebellions erupted, leading to a peasant leader establishing the Ming dynasty in 1368 and declaring himself the Hongwu Emperor. The Ming later moved their capital from Nanjing to Beijing, with the Forbidden City as the imperial palace. However, the lower Yangtze remained the wealthiest region. Trade grew, and the European colonization of the Americas brought new crops and a massive influx of silver to China. The population doubled, and a growing publishing industry began producing works in vernacular Chinese, including the Four Classic Novels.

The Ming state declined, and by the 1600s, became unable to contain peasant rebellions. The Manchus to the north declared the Qing dynasty in 1636 and conquered the Ming, killing their last claimant emperor in 1662 and conquering a Ming rump state on Taiwan in 1683. From the late 1600s to the end of the 1700s, the High Qing era saw economic growth and territorial expansion westward, including the conquest of Tibet and much of Central Asia.

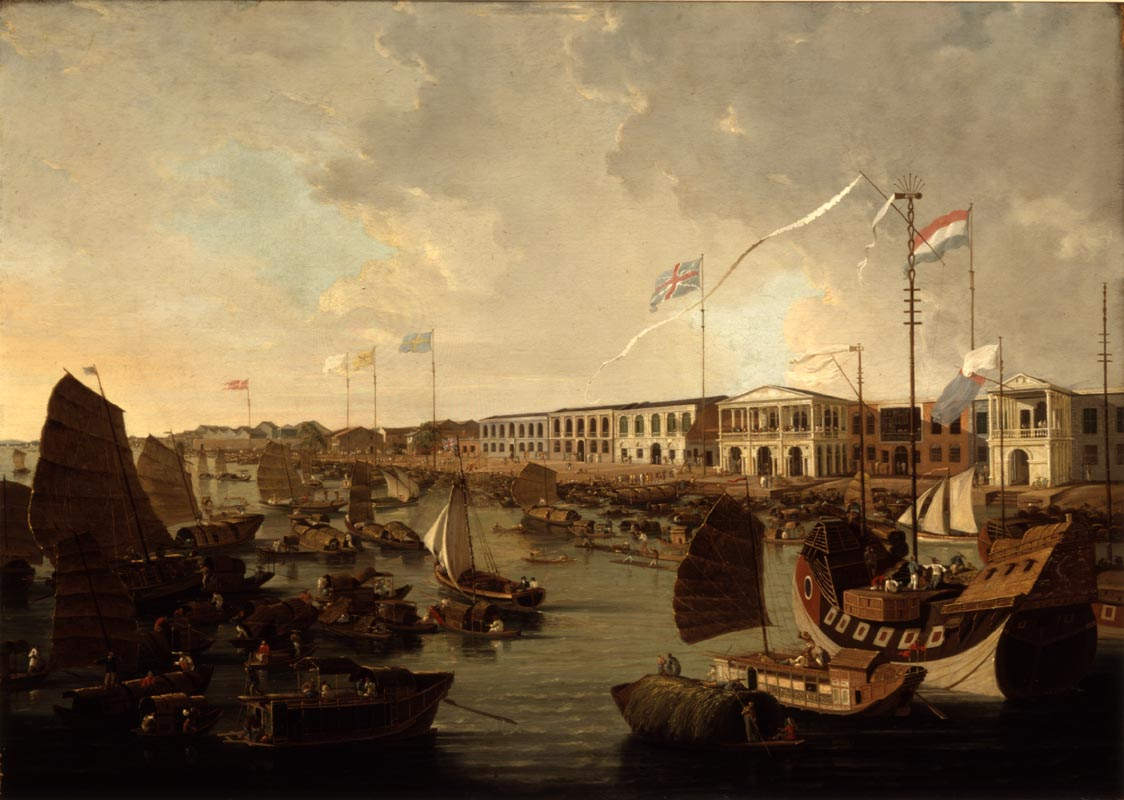
1805 painting of the European factories in Guangzhou (Canton)

European powers fought various wars against the Qing dynasty during the 19th century. These began with the United Kingdom's First Opium War in 1839–1842, which resulted in the first of the "unequal treaties" imposed on the dynasty. These opened treaty ports, allowed Christian missionary activity, and loosened trade restrictions. China faced an economic crisis and internal unrest, and uprisings such as the 1850–1864 Taiping Rebellion resulted in the deaths of millions. Reformist factions of the Qing responded with the Self-Strengthening Movement, seeking to adopt Western weapons and technologies, but this had a limited impact for much of the empire.

The Empire of Japan's defeat of the Qing in the First Sino-Japanese War (1894–1895) resulted in the loss of Taiwan and the growth of both reformist and revolutionary political movements. An imperial push for reform in 1898 ended after an internal coup, while the anti-foreign Boxer Rebellion was defeated by a coalition of foreign powers in 1901. The late Qing dynasty again advanced reforms, but growing revolutionary and anti-Manchu sentiment culminated in the 1911 Revolution. A coalition of revolutionaries led by Sun Yat-sen overthrew the Qing and declared the Republic of China (ROC) in 1912.

=== Republic of China ===
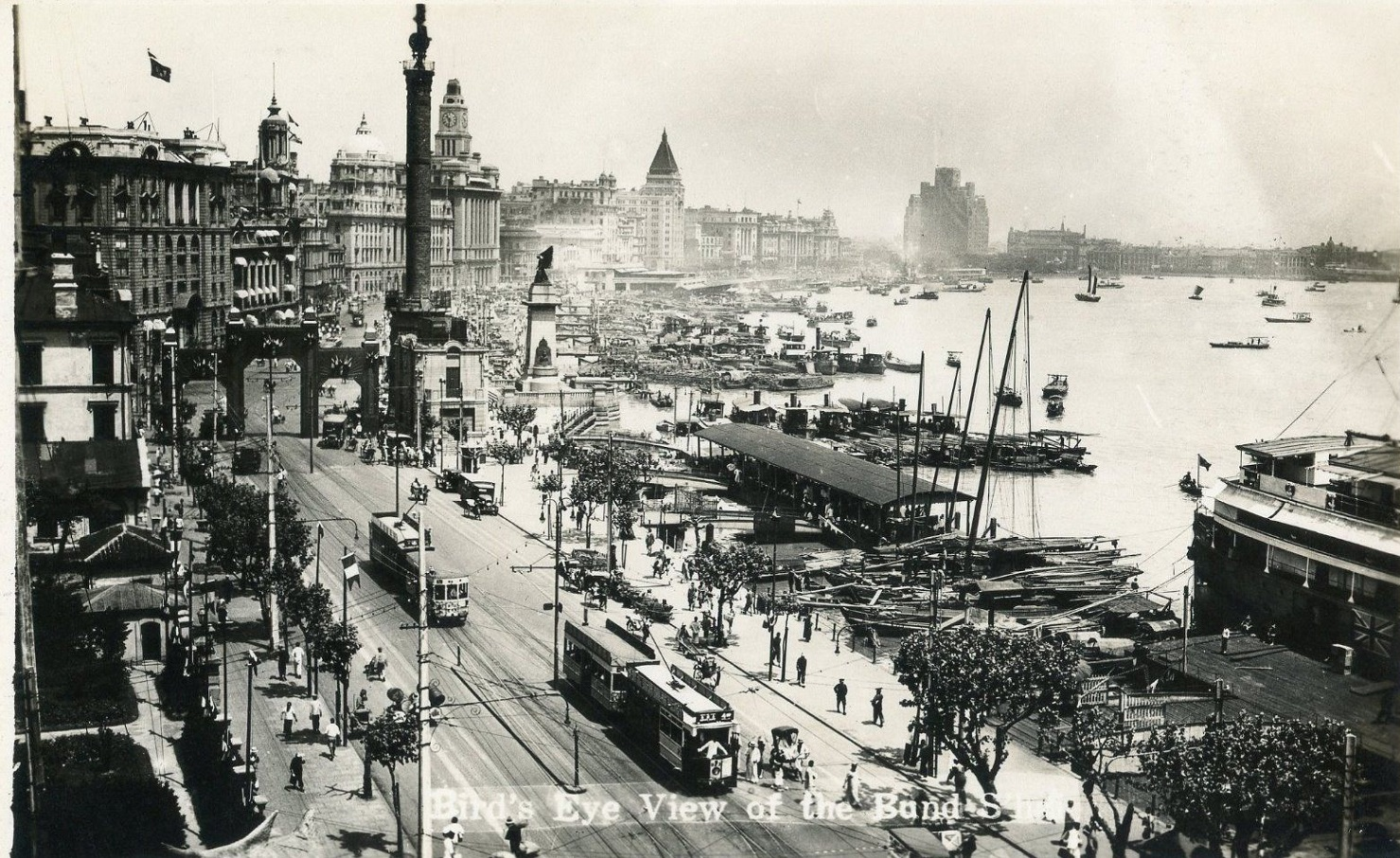
The Shanghai Bund, c. 1934

President Yuan Shikai rose to power in 1912 and crushed his main opposition, the Kuomintang, ruling China as a dictator until his death in 1916, following an abortive attempt to restore the monarchy. During the Warlord Era, feuding regional warlords and governors took power across China, while Tibet and Mongolia declared independence. The nominal republican government had little control outside Beijing. During this period, New Culture intellectuals and students criticized traditional society. A crackdown on a student protest in 1919 led to the May Fourth Movement and further agitation by intellectuals for a cultural and political upheaval, with many embracing Western political ideas such as communism.

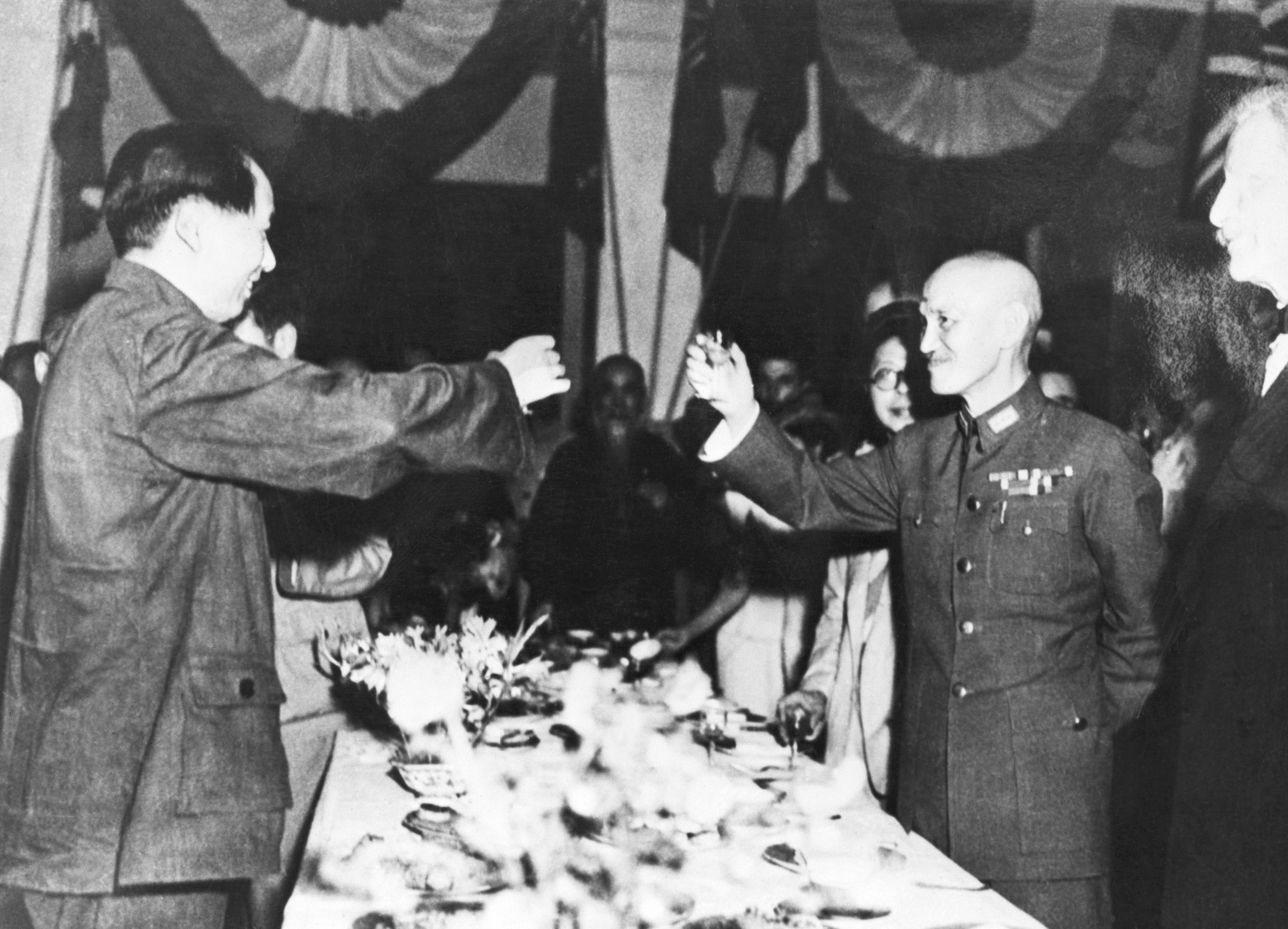
Mao Zedong and Chiang Kai-shek toasting together in 1945 following the end of World War II

In the mid-1920s, the Kuomintang allied with the nascent Chinese Communist Party (CCP), and partially reunified China under Chiang Kai-shek's leadership. Starting with the Shanghai massacre in 1927, the Kuomintang violently purged the CCP and gained the allegiance of the northern warlords, establishing a new government at Nanjing. The CCP was driven into the countryside and repressed, but subsequently regrouped in the northwest.

Japan occupied Manchuria in 1931, and launched an invasion of the rest of China in 1937. A renewed coalition between the CCP and Kuomintang fought Japan in what became a theater of World War II, as Japanese forces committed numerous war atrocities against the civilian population and occupied most of China's major cities. During the Second World War, the Republic of China was recognized as one of the Four Policemen, and was later considered one of the four primary victors in the war. After the surrender of Japan in 1945, the Republic of China became a founding member of the United Nations and regained control over Manchuria and Taiwan. The civil war between the CCP and the Kuomintang resumed the following year.

=== People's Republic of China ===
After a string of military victories, CCP chairman Mao Zedong formally proclaimed the People's Republic of China (PRC) in 1949. The ROC government retreated to Taiwan and continued to claim legitimacy. The following year, the PRC occupied and annexed Tibet. The PRC, which the CCP described as a "people's democratic dictatorship", enacted many reforms: it restructured the economy under state control, promoted literacy and gender equality, and expanded heavy industry. The Land Reform Movement, in which the state encouraged and organized peasant violence against landlords, leading to the death of upwards of a million people, had begun in northern China during the civil war and extended to most of the rest of China between 1950 and 1952. It distributed landlord land to the peasants as private property, but it was soon followed by collectivization of the land.

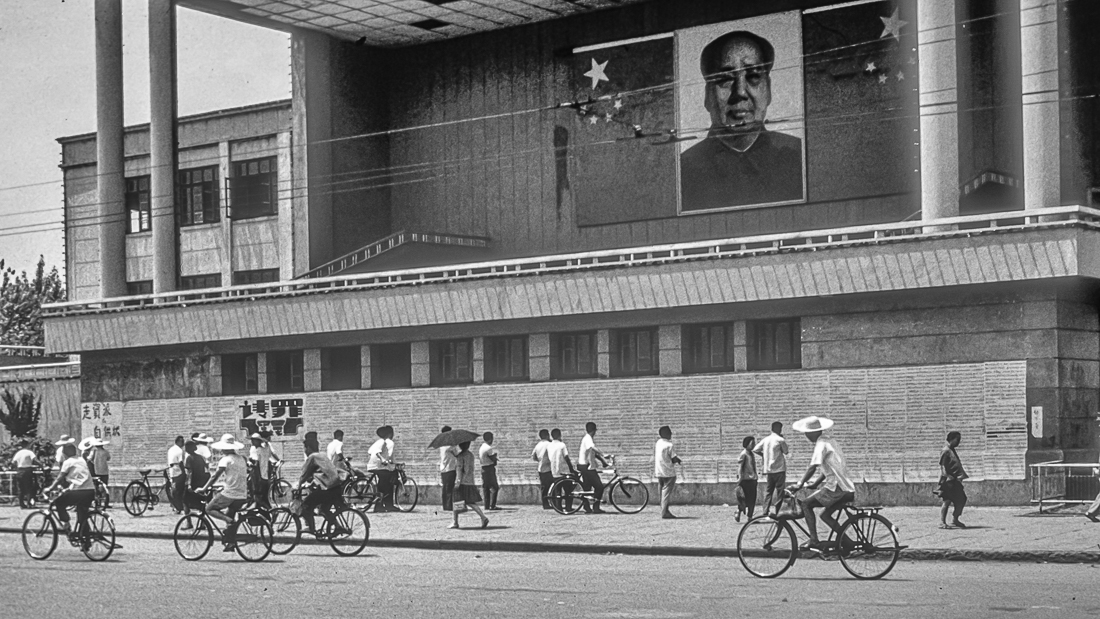
A big-character poster and portrait of Mao Zedong in Beijing during the Cultural Revolution, 1976

In 1958, Mao launched the Great Leap Forward, a mass industrialization project which resulted in the Great Chinese Famine and millions of deaths. As the Cold War deepened, China grew politically isolated from its former ally, the Soviet Union, as well as the Western Bloc. It detonated its first atomic bomb in 1964. Attempting to reassert control over the CCP after the Great Leap, Mao and his allies launched the Cultural Revolution in 1966, sparking a decade of political violence, crackdowns on perceived counterrevolutionaries, and social upheaval that lasted until Mao's death in 1976.

Deng Xiaoping served as paramount leader from 1978 to 1989. The reform and opening-up policies of the 1980s and 1990s saw economic liberalization towards a socialist market economy, rapid economic growth, and improved relations with the West. Political dissent culminated in a mild crackdown early in 1987 and a much more severe and prolonged crackdown in 1989 that included the Tiananmen Square massacre. China shifted away from an agricultural economy and rapidly urbanized, although this led to stark economic inequality between urban and rural areas, as well as environmental deterioration. Since the 1990s, market forces have become China's main economic driver. Xi Jinping became CCP general secretary in 2012; he has launched a far-reaching anti-corruption campaign, expanded Chinese economic influence through the Belt and Road Initiative, and abolished term limits for himself as state president. (Note: Constitutional amendments in the first session of the 13th National People's Congress saw the removal of term limits for the state president, a ceremonial role. There have never been formal term limits for neither the Chairman of the CMC nor the General Secretary of the CCP.)

== Geography ==
Mountains along the Li River in Guangxi

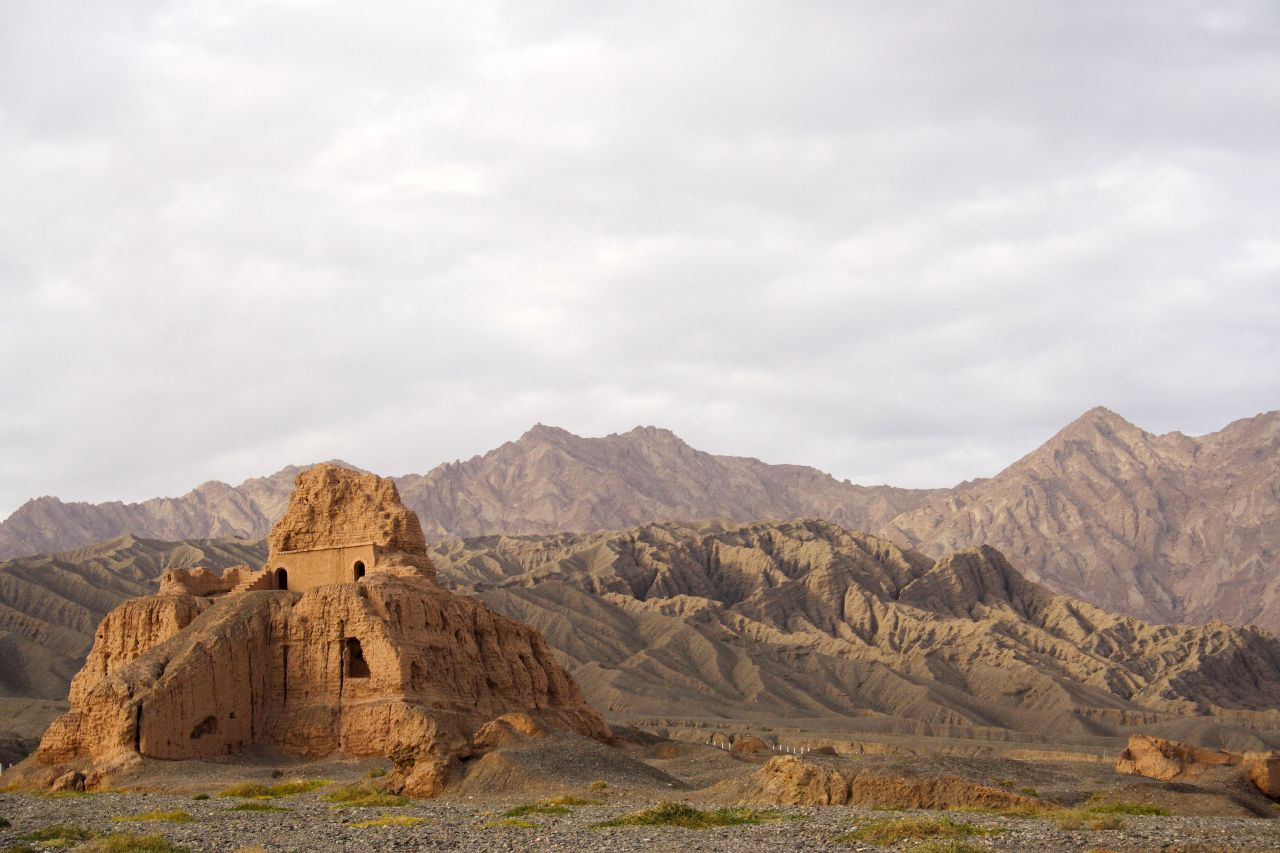
Subashi Temple ruins in the Taklamakan Desert, Xinjiang

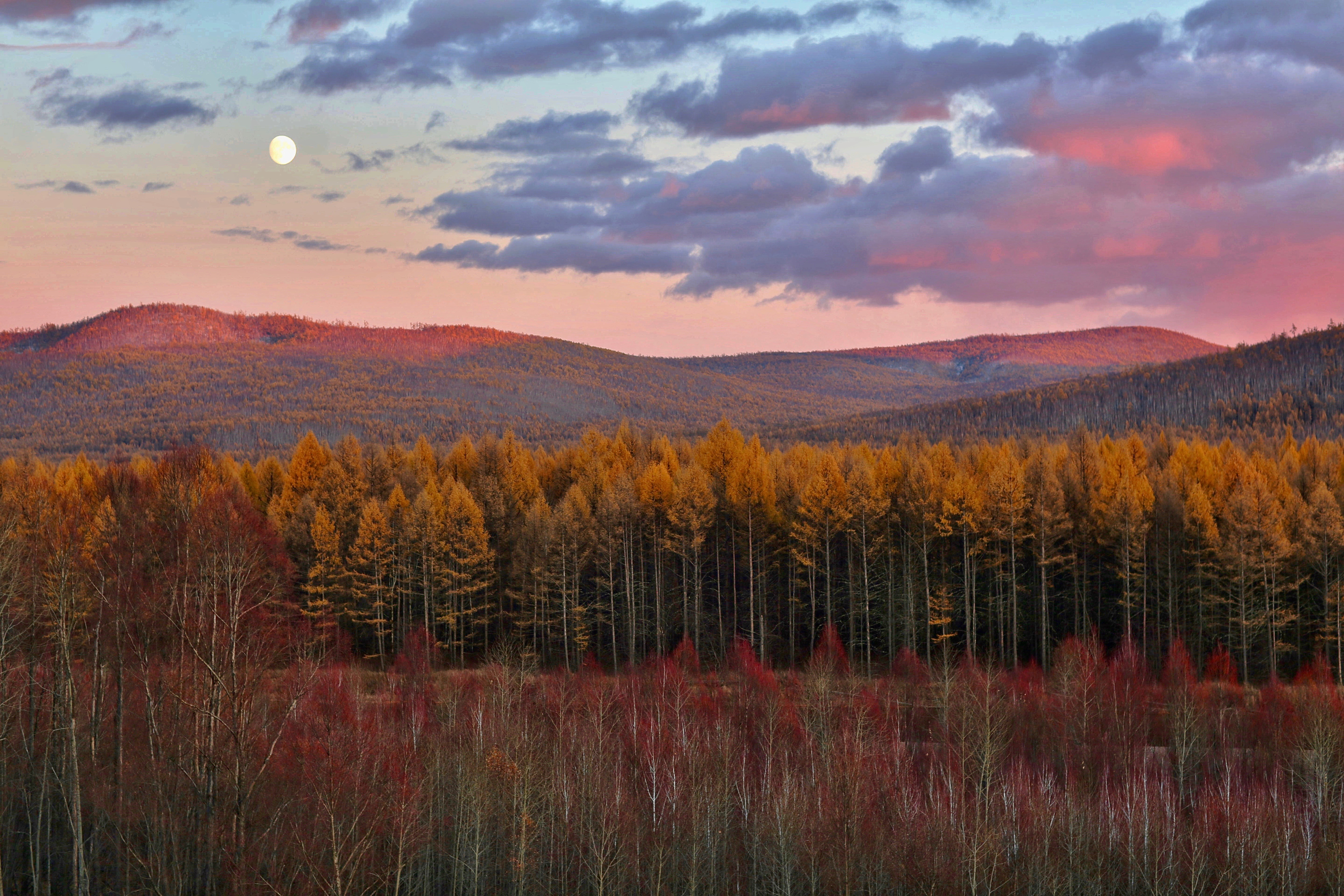
Boreal forest in the Greater Khingan, Inner Mongolia

China's geography is highly varied, featuring a dry and mountainous west, alongside both mountains and wide river valleys in the east. Chinese civilization was traditionally centered in the lowlands around China's two longest rivers: the Yangtze and the Yellow River, both originating on the Tibetan Plateau. This temperate region is bordered by forest and steppe to the north, as well as the mountainous and subtropical south. China's shoreline spans the Bohai Sea, Yellow Sea, East China Sea, and South China Sea, all part of the Pacific Ocean. Its largest island is Taiwan, and the largest governed by the PRC is Hainan. Poyang Lake is the largest of the country's many freshwater lakes.

Large mountain ranges in the west, including the Himalayas and Tian Shan, separate China from South and Central Asia. China features both the Turpan Depression, among the deepest points on land, and the high Tibetan Plateau. The world's highest point, Mount Everest (8,848 metres or 29,029 feet above sea level), lies on the border with Nepal. China has a wide variety of ore and mineral resources.

China's climate is dominated by dry seasons and wet monsoons, which lead to pronounced seasonal temperature differences. In the winter, northern winds coming from high-latitude areas are cold and dry; in summer, southern winds from coastal areas at lower latitudes are warm and moist. The northwestern deserts receive as little as 50 mm (2.0 in) of rainfall annually, while much of southern China exceeds 1,000 mm (39 in). Eastern China is well-suited for agriculture, with two or three harvests per year. The south is dominated by rice farming, while the north grows crops such as wheat and maize.

China frequently faces natural disasters. Its adjacency to both the Pacific Ring of Fire and the Alpide belt (tectonic belts) results in frequent earthquakes, the cause of the majority of China's natural disaster deaths. Severe quakes such as the 1976 Tangshan earthquake cause hundreds of thousands of deaths. Rainstorms and flooding are common hazards, with the Yellow River's perennial floods devastating the surrounding plains throughout recorded history. Typhoons frequently impact southeastern China.

=== Environment ===
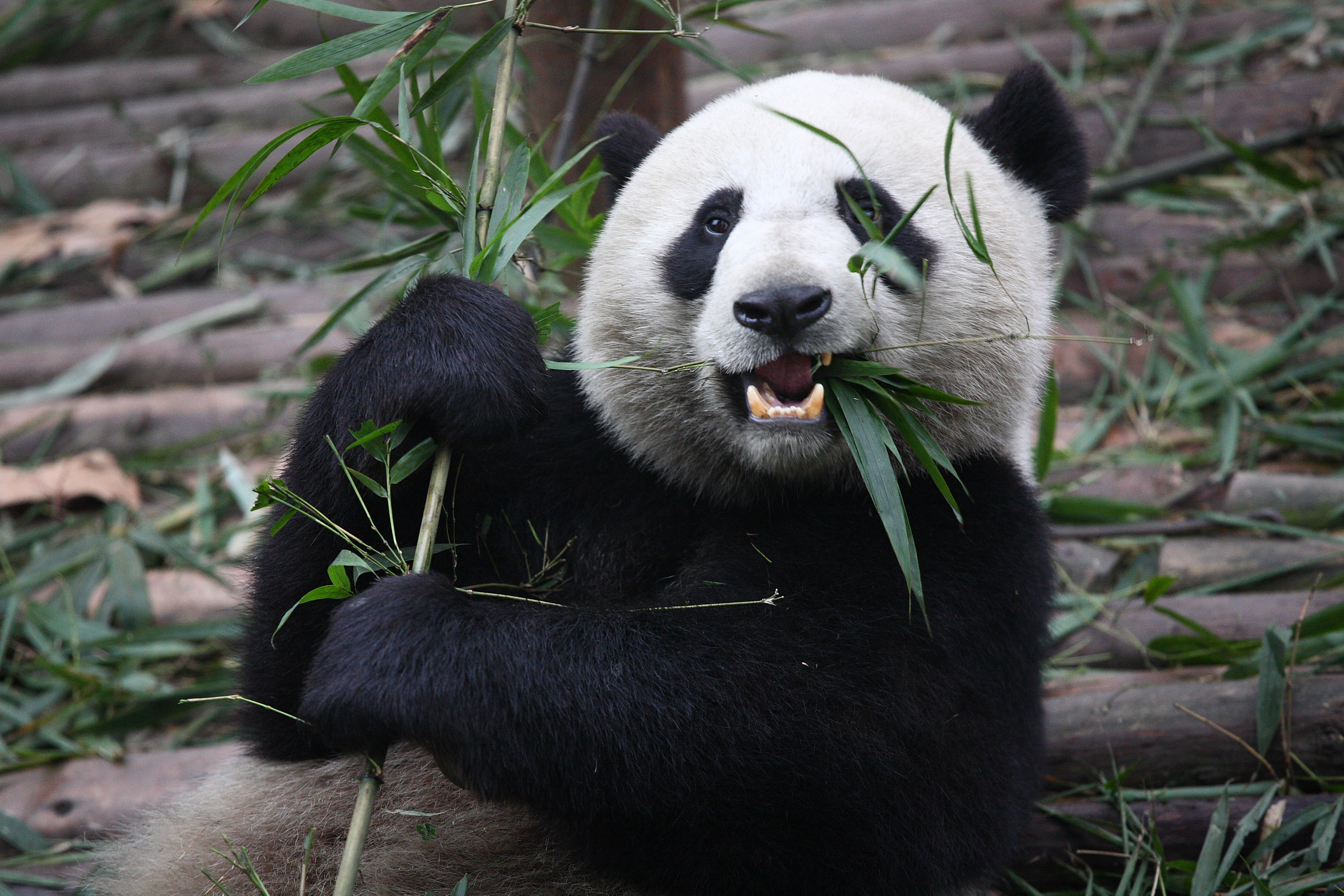
A giant panda, a symbol of China, eating bamboo

China is one of 17 megadiverse countries, containing a wide variety of forests, shrublands, wetlands, steppes, and deserts, which host (as of 2018) 92,300 known species and subspecies of plants, animals, and fungi. According to government surveys, China's forest coverage grew from 10% of the overall territory in 1949 to 25% in 2024. The far north contains taiga, which transitions into deciduous forest to the south. South of the Yangtze, mixed conifer and deciduous forest is common, with tropical and subtropical forests farther south.

In the 21st century, China has suffered from environmental deterioration and pollution due to rapid development, alongside the broader effects of climate change. About 11% of its plant species and 21% of its vertebrate species are threatened or endangered due to habitat loss, pollution, and poaching. "Flagship" endangered species such as the giant panda and tiger have received additional funding and protection.

Although China has the world's highest CO_{2} emissions, it only emits 8 tons of CO_{2} per capita as of 2020, significantly lower than many developed countries. Total greenhouse gas emissions by China are the world's largest. China has prioritized reducing pollution, announcing its aims to reach its peak emissions levels before 2030, and achieve carbon neutrality by 2060. Water quality in China has been impacted by rapid development and high levels of agricultural runoff and heavy metal pollution.

China is the world's leading investor in renewable energy and its commercialization, investing CN¥3.6 trillion (US$546 billion) in 2022 alone. Traditionally reliant on non-renewable energy sources such as coal, China's adoption of renewable energy has increased significantly in the 2010s and 2020s. In 2025, 54.4% of China's electricity came from coal, while 41.6% came from clean energy, with the remainder from other fossil fuels. Despite its emphasis on renewables, China remains dependent on global oil markets.

=== Political geography ===
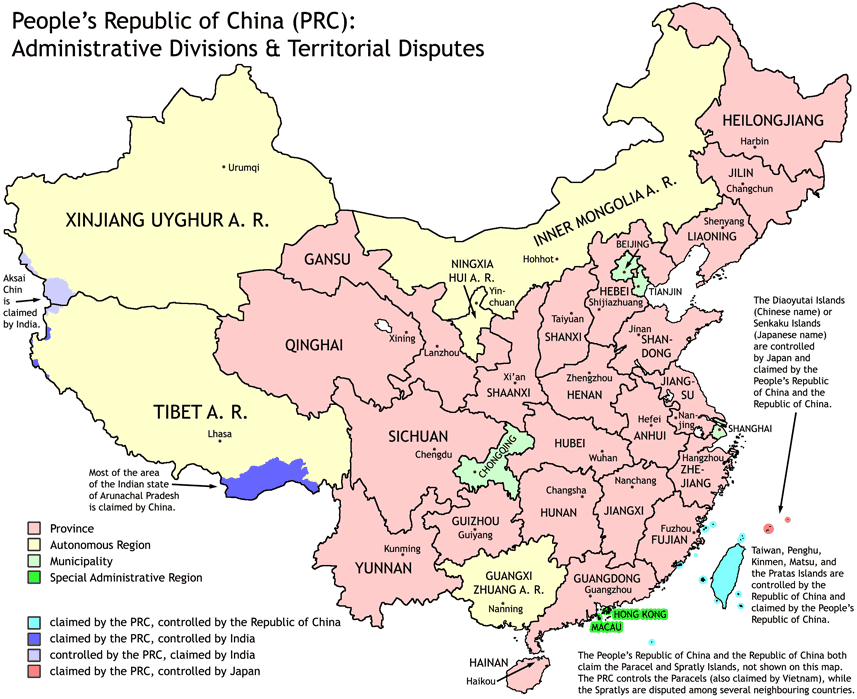
China's administrative divisions and territorial disputes

Territorial disputes in the South China Sea, with the Chinese claim in red

China is the second-largest country by land area after Russia, and the third or fourth largest by total area. Total area figures are generally around 9,596,961 km^{2} (3,705,407 sq mi). China borders 14 nations, with a combined land border length of 22,117 km (13,743 mi). Its coastline spans approximately 14,500 km (9,000 mi).

The PRC has engaged in 23 border disputes since 1949, of which six remain unsettled. It actively disputes several portions of its Himalayan border with India, including Aksai Chin in Kashmir and the Indian state of Arunachal Pradesh, which led to military skirmishes in 2020. It maintains maritime disputes with Japan over the Senkaku/Diaoyu Islands and with various countries over a group of South China Sea Islands within the "Nine-dash line", including the Spratlys and Paracels. This has led to skirmishes with Vietnam and the Philippines.

Both the PRC and the ROC on Taiwan claim legitimacy as the government of China, leading to cross-strait tensions. Taiwan is a de jure province of the PRC, with the ROC-controlled islands of Kinmen and Matsu as a part of Fujian Province.

== Politics ==
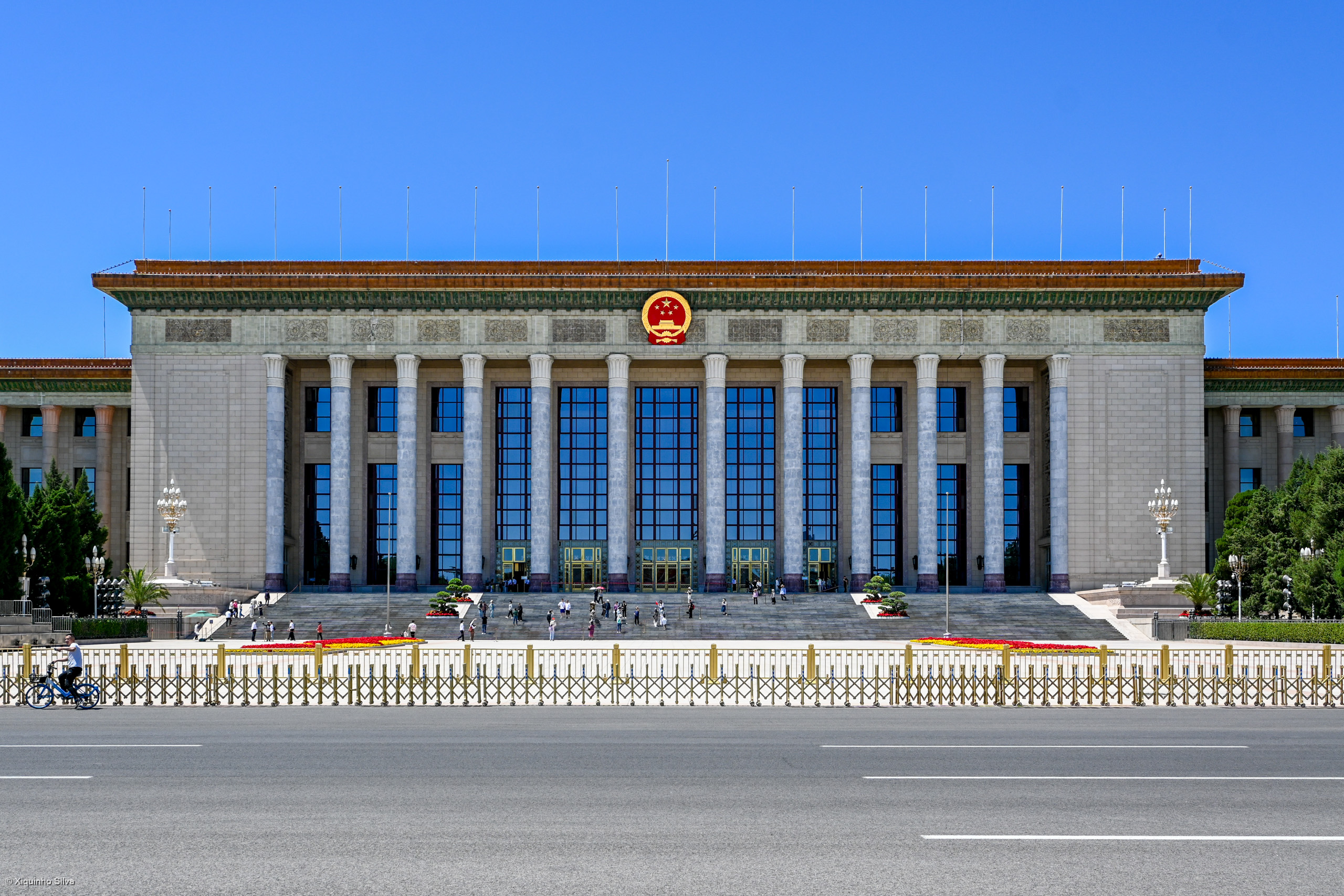
The Great Hall of the People,
where the National People's Congress convenes

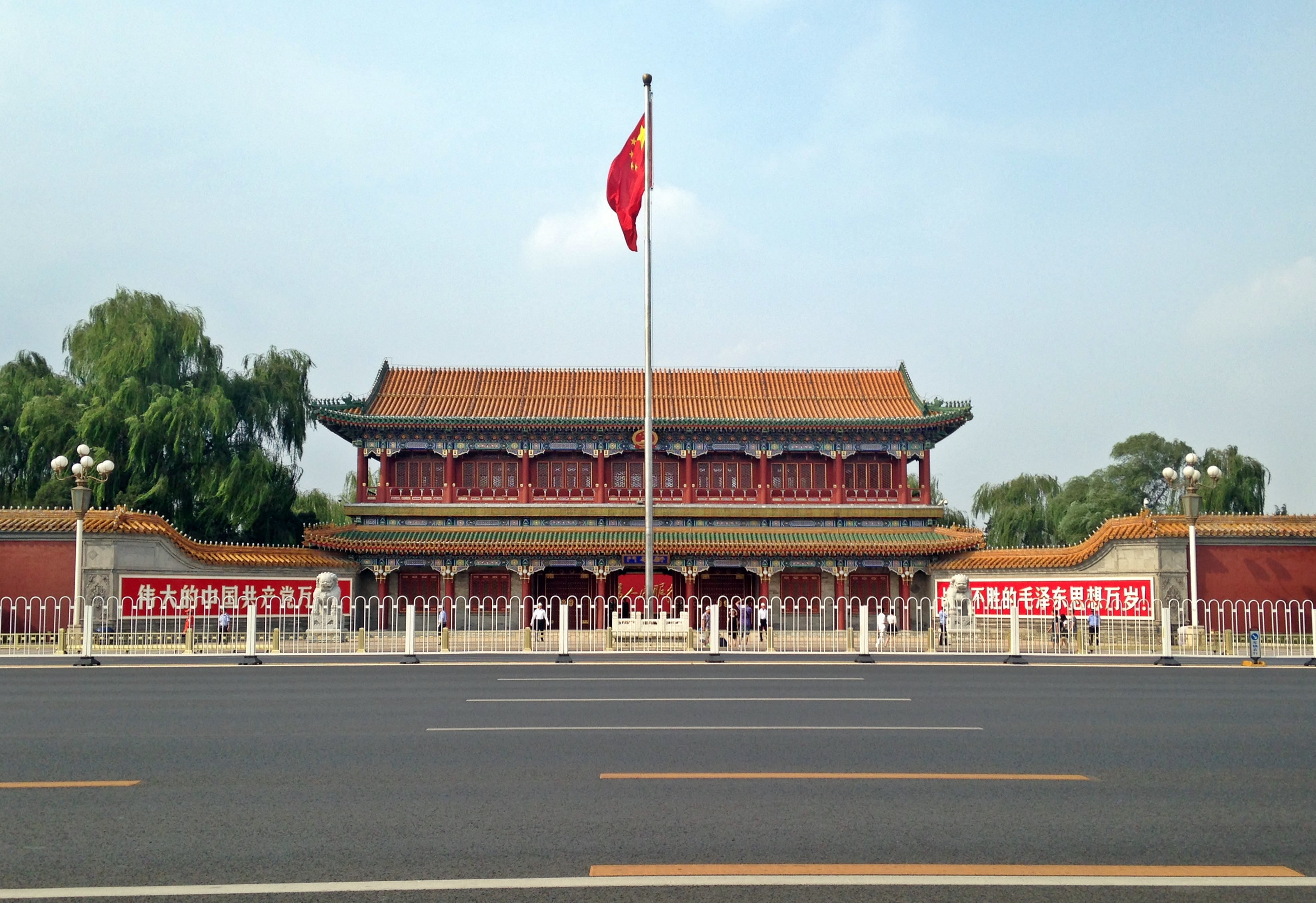
Zhongnanhai, headquarters of the Chinese government and Chinese Communist Party

China is a unitary state under the absolute leadership of the Chinese Communist Party. Since the 1980s, the CCP has called its guiding theories and policies socialism with Chinese characteristics, which it considers an adapted form of Marxism–Leninism that emphasizes a market economy as the primary stage of socialism. China describes itself as a socialist state, and a people's democratic dictatorship. (Note: "People's Democratic Dictatorship" (Chinese: 人民民主专政) is essentially synonymous with the more common Marxist term, dictatorship of the proletariat.) Many academic sources describe it as an authoritarian state, although others dispute this label as reductive, or as oversimplifying its methods of political control.

The National People's Congress (NPC) holds the unified powers of the state and oversight over all state organs, with its Standing Committee elected to meet between the annual NPC meetings. NPC elections are indirect and the CCP controls nominations. The NPC elects the president, vice president, military chairman, chief prosecutor and chief supervisor, and approves the president's nomination for premier (the head of government). In practice, the CCP leadership chooses candidates for these posts. The premier heads the State Council, which includes vice premiers, state councilors and 26 ministers, such as the heads of ministries and commissions. The Chinese People's Political Consultative Conference is an advisory body that formally leads the CCP's united front system, which aims to gain support from non-CCP intellectuals, eight minor parties, and people's organizations.

China's current constitution dates to 1982, succeeding two earlier constitutions. Chinese governance is characterized by a high degree of political centralization but significant economic decentralization. Policy instruments and processes are often tested locally before being adopted more widely. Surveys have generally shown that the Chinese public has a high level of support for the government. (Note: Surveys which have shown high government approval ratings include 2003, 2009, and 2015–2016 surveys by the Harvard Kennedy School, and the 2017–2020 World Values Survey.)

=== Chinese Communist Party ===
Xi Jinping
CCP General Secretary and President

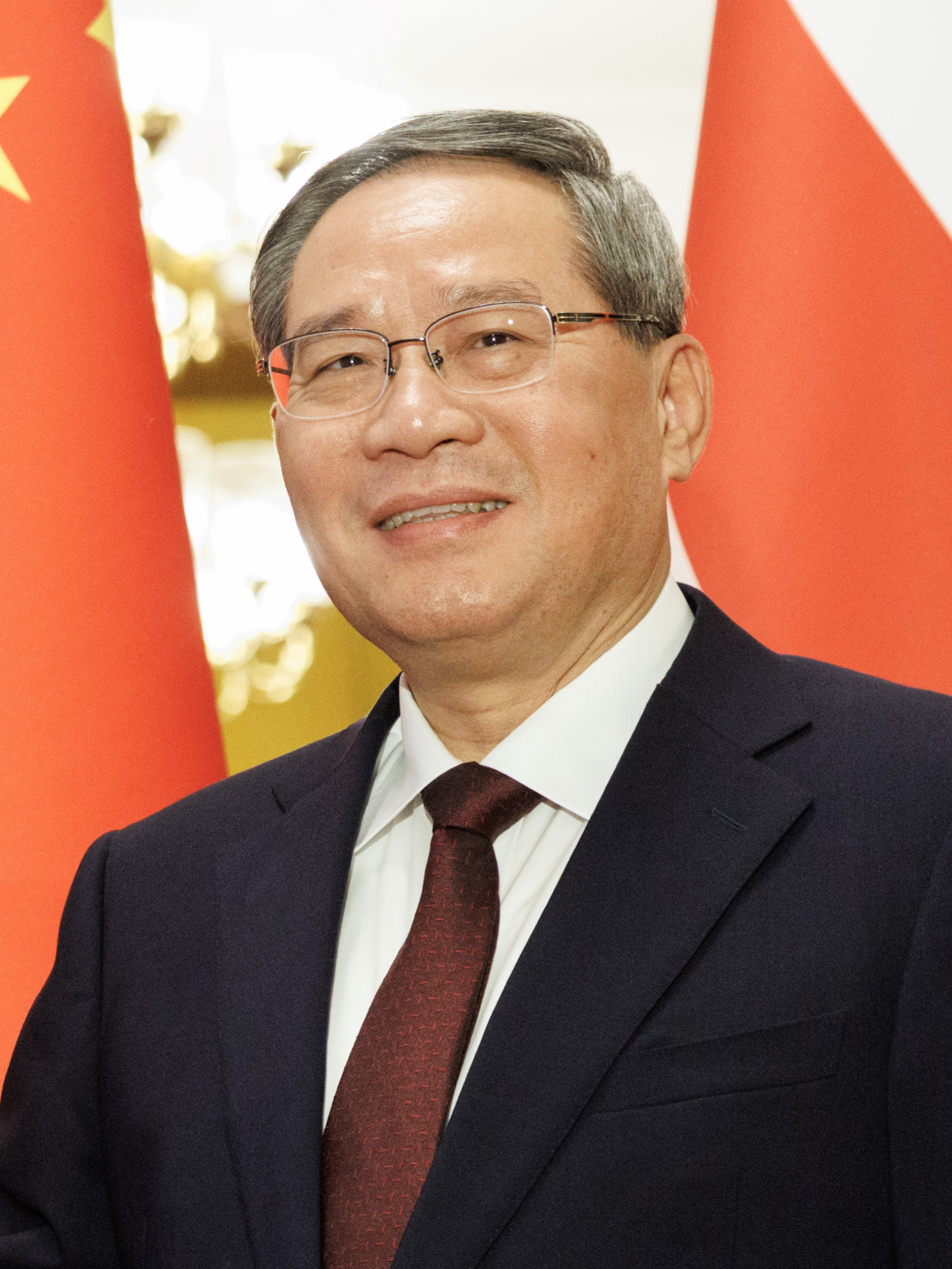
Li Qiang
Premier

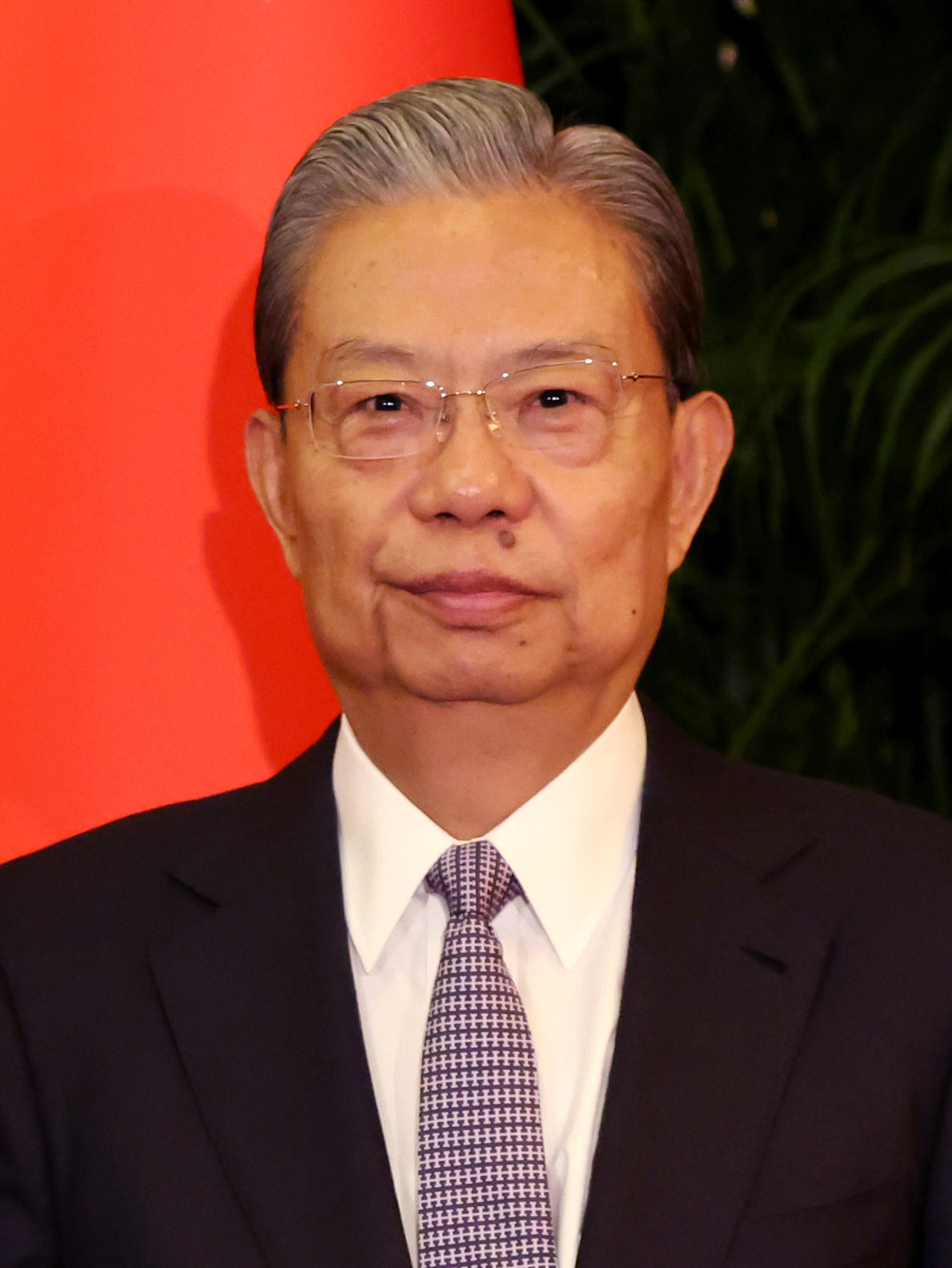
Zhao Leji
Congress chairman

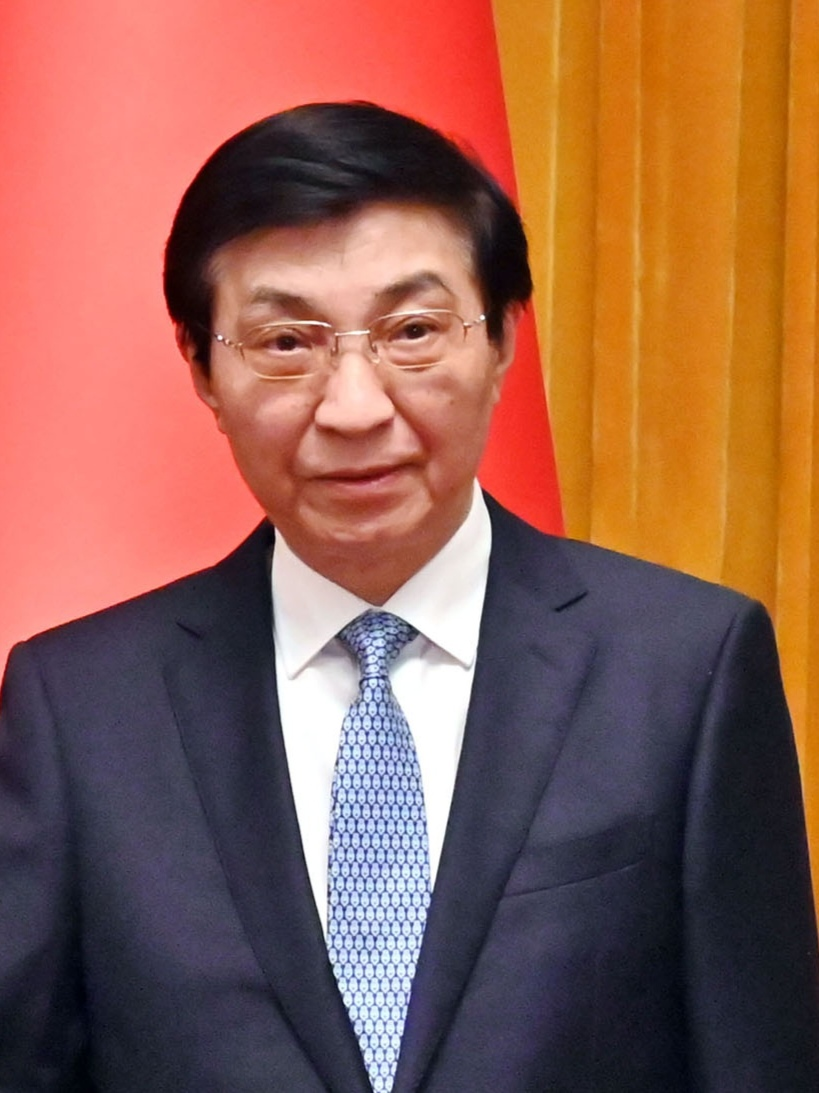
Wang Huning
CPPCC chairman

The CCP is the founding and sole ruling party of China, organized along Leninist principles as a vanguard party. With about 101 million members, it is among the world's largest political parties, as well as the longest continuously ruling. The party's highest body is its National Congress, which mainly consists of members elected by party membership (Note: In the October 2022 congress, 2,296 members were elected and 83 were invited.) and meets every five years. The National Congress elects the Central Committee, which convenes yearly as the highest party organ between congresses. The Central Committee formally elects the party's top leadership, the Politburo, Politburo Standing Committee (PSC) and the general secretary, its top leader. In practice, the committee typically approves a slate of candidates created by existing party leadership.

The Politburo usually gathers once a month, while the smaller PSC is thought to meet weekly. The current general secretary is Xi Jinping, who took office on 15 November 2012. Xi concurrently serves as president and the chair of the Central Military Commission (CMC); as such, he is referred to informally as the paramount leader of China. The National Congress also elects the Central Commission for Discipline Inspection, the party's main disciplinary and anti-corruption organ.

As the CCP is closely intertwined with the government, disputes within the party represent the main form of political contention in China. The CCP controls government appointments, with most senior officials being CCP members. The appointments of CCP cadres and the leadership of major state-owned enterprises and institutions are managed by the party's Organization Department. The Leninist principle of democratic centralism mandates that party decisions are binding on all members.

=== Administrative divisions ===
China is constitutionally a unitary state divided into 23 provinces, (Note: The People's Republic of China claims the islands of Taiwan and Penghu, which it does not control, as its 23rd province, i.e. Taiwan Province; along with Kinmen and Matsu Islands as part of Fujian Province. These are controlled by the Taipei-based Republic of China (ROC). See § Administrative divisions for more details.) five autonomous regions (each with a designated minority group), four direct-administered municipalities, as well as the autonomous special administrative regions (SARs) of Hong Kong and Macau. Provinces and their equivalents are divided into prefectures and prefecture-level cities. These are divided into counties, county-level cities, and districts. Under these, townships are the basic form of local government. Direct elections occur only at the township and county levels and below.

First level administrative divisions of China by type
Type	List
Provinces	Anhui (安徽省); Fujian (福建省); Gansu (甘肃省); Guangdong (广东省); Guizhou (贵州省); Hainan (海南省); Hebei (河北省); Heilongjiang (黑龙江省); Henan (河南省); Hubei (湖北省); Hunan (湖南省); Jiangsu (江苏省); Jiangxi (江西省); Jilin (吉林省); Liaoning (辽宁省); Qinghai (青海省); Shaanxi (陕西省); Shandong (山东省); Shanxi (山西省); Sichuan (四川省); Yunnan (云南省); Zhejiang (浙江省)
Provinces	Taiwan (台湾省), governed by the Republic of China
Autonomous regions	Guangxi (广西壮族自治区); Inner Mongolia (内蒙古自治区); Ningxia (宁夏回族自治区); Tibet (西藏自治区); Xinjiang (新疆维吾尔自治区)
Direct-administered municipalities	Beijing (北京市); Chongqing (重庆市); Shanghai (上海市); Tianjin (天津市)
Special administrative regions	Hong Kong (香港特别行政区); Macau (澳门特别行政区)

=== Foreign relations ===
Diplomatic relations of China: People's Republic of China (PRC) Republic of China (ROC) States that have diplomatic relations with the PRC States that have diplomatic relations with the ROC States that have diplomatic relations with neither

China is one of five permanent members of the United Nations Security Council and the second largest contributor to the United Nations. China has the largest diplomatic network of any country: It has diplomatic relations with 179 United Nations member states and embassies in 174. China is a member of the G20, BRICS, East Asia Summit, APEC, and other intergovernmental organizations.

China is widely described as a superpower due to its influence in geopolitics, technology, manufacturing, economics and culture. Although China moderated its relations with the West during the reform era, its rise in power has brought political tensions with many of its neighbors and with the United States, the current dominant superpower. China is among the United States' largest trade partners, but their relationship is tempered by a trade war and disagreements over the political status of Taiwan.

China's foreign policy is based on the Five Principles of Peaceful Coexistence, which include a principle of non-intervention in other countries' domestic affairs. Per its policy of non-alignment, China has no defense pacts except for its 1961 treaty with North Korea, although it maintains close relationships with neighbors such as Pakistan and Russia. China has invested heavily in developing countries across Asia, Latin America, and Africa, creating a system of development banks and loans through the Belt and Road Initiative.

=== Military ===
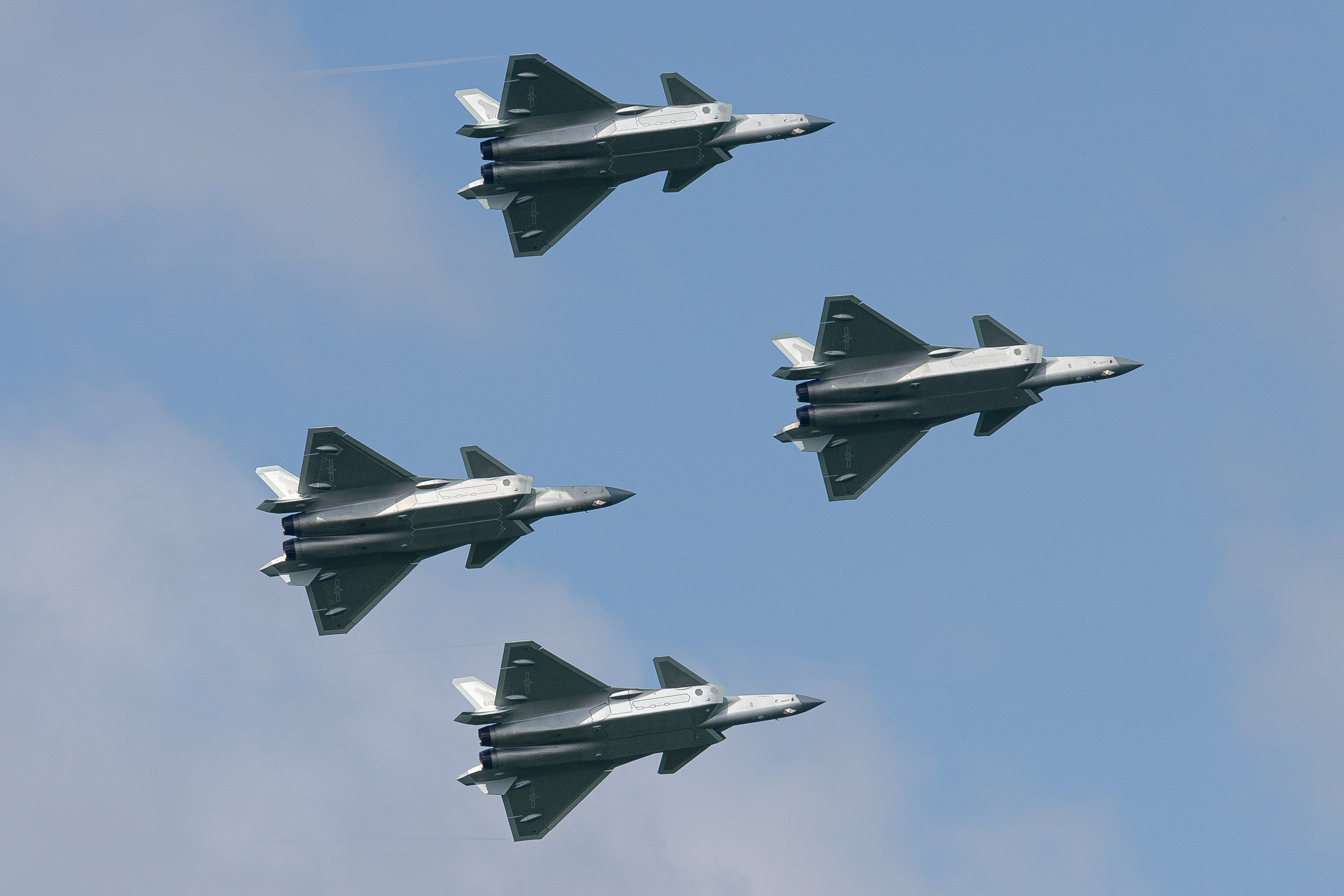
Chengdu J-20 5th generation stealth fighter

The People's Liberation Army (PLA) is the main armed forces of China, under the direct control of the CCP. It consists of four services: the Ground Force, the Navy, the Air Force, and the Rocket Force, and four arms: the Aerospace Force, the Cyberspace Force, the Information Support Force, and the Joint Logistics Support Force. It has around 2 million active soldiers, and the world's third largest stockpile of nuclear weapons, and the world's largest navy by ship count.

The PLA is considered one of the world's most powerful militaries and has rapidly modernized in the 21st century. A 2026 study estimates that its 2025 expenditure was 2.27 trillion yuan (US$336 billion), 12% of global military spending and 1.7% of China's GDP. The PLA, the People's Armed Police and the Militia are commanded by the Central Military Commission. Due to the chairman responsibility system, the chairman of the CMC, currently Xi Jinping, is the commander-in-chief of the PLA.

=== Law and policing ===
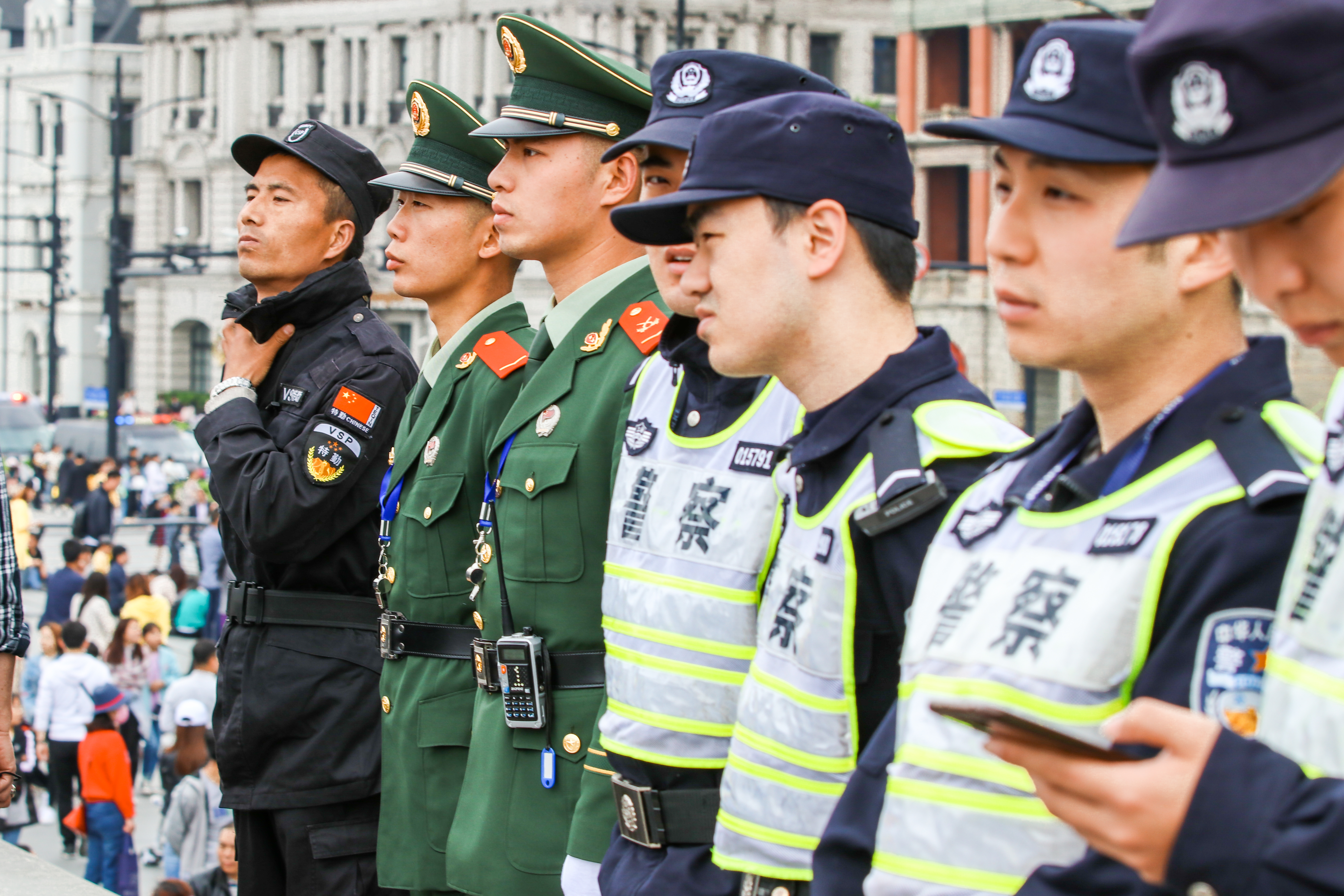
Police officers in Shanghai

The Chinese judicial system consists of people's courts at provincial, regional, and local levels, alongside circuit courts for regional matters and specialized courts to handle professional disputes. The highest legal authority is the Supreme People's Court. The courts are closely controlled by the CCP, supervised by corresponding people's congresses, and led by CCP appointees. PRC law derives from a combination of civil law, traditional Chinese law, and socialist law.

China's law enforcement system is managed by the Ministry of Public Security, which oversees public security bureaus (PSBs) in each province, themselves divided into local levels. Local sub-bureaus and stations handle most routine policing. The People's Armed Police, a paramilitary force, is administered by the CMC and supports emergency response measures. The social credit system maintains a network of blacklists to record businesses and individuals who violate regulations, court orders, or financial agreements. China has periodically mobilized anti-crime campaigns, using heavy penalties as a form of deterrence. Violent crimes are the highest priority for enforcement, although they occur at relatively low rates. Capital punishment has declined since the Mao era, but remains common; China has the most executions per year of any country.

=== Human rights ===
Various human rights organizations, United Nations assessments, and foreign governments have accused China of severe human rights violations. It has been accused of political repression, torture, indefinite detention, restrictions on free speech and religious practice, excessive use of capital punishment, and the persecution of ethnic minorities.

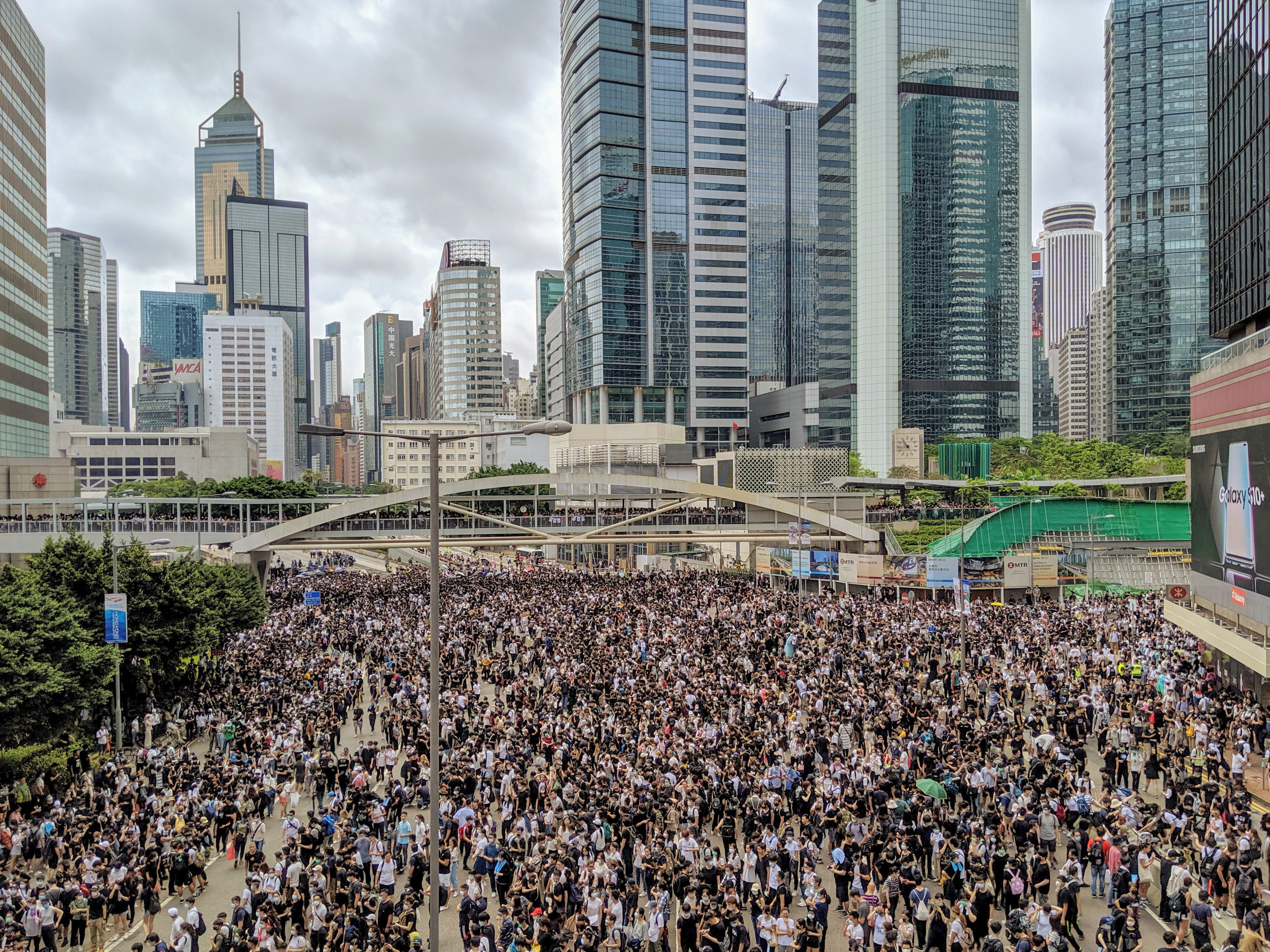
China cracked down on political rights in Hong Kong following the 2019-2020 protests.

Although the Chinese constitution protects a wide variety of civil and political rights, these largely lack enforcement mechanisms. The petitioning system allows citizens to raise complaints of wrongdoing, although the concerns are often left unaddressed, and some petitioners have faced punitive arrest or incarceration. In the 21st century, China has participated extensively in the United Nations Human Rights Council, but remains strongly critical of international scrutiny of its human rights, seeing it as interference in its internal affairs.

In Xinjiang, China has persecuted the Uyghur population through widespread discrimination, police crackdowns, and restrictions on Islamic religious practice and the use of the Uyghur language. China interred over a million Uyghurs in a network of re-education camps in the late 2010s. These facilities have evolved into a system of prisons and forced labor. Several UN OHCHR (Note: Office of the United Nations High Commissioner for Human Rights) experts have equated it to "enslavement as a crime against humanity". Alongside evidence of compulsory sterilization, many genocide scholars have described these actions in Xinjiang as a genocide or cultural genocide.

China has restricted the civil and political rights of Hong Kong residents. Since the 2019–2020 protests, China has cracked down on the pro-democracy movement in the SAR and removed much of its political autonomy. China has cracked down on political expression in Tibet and strengthened surveillance since the late 2000s, restricting residents from obtaining passports and most foreigners from entering the region.

China does not recognize same-sex marriage or same-sex adoption, and regularly censors LGBTQ-related media. Many Chinese hospitals provide sexual conversion therapy, viewing homosexuality as a mental disorder. LGBTQ rights advocates are surveilled and criminalized.

== Economy ==
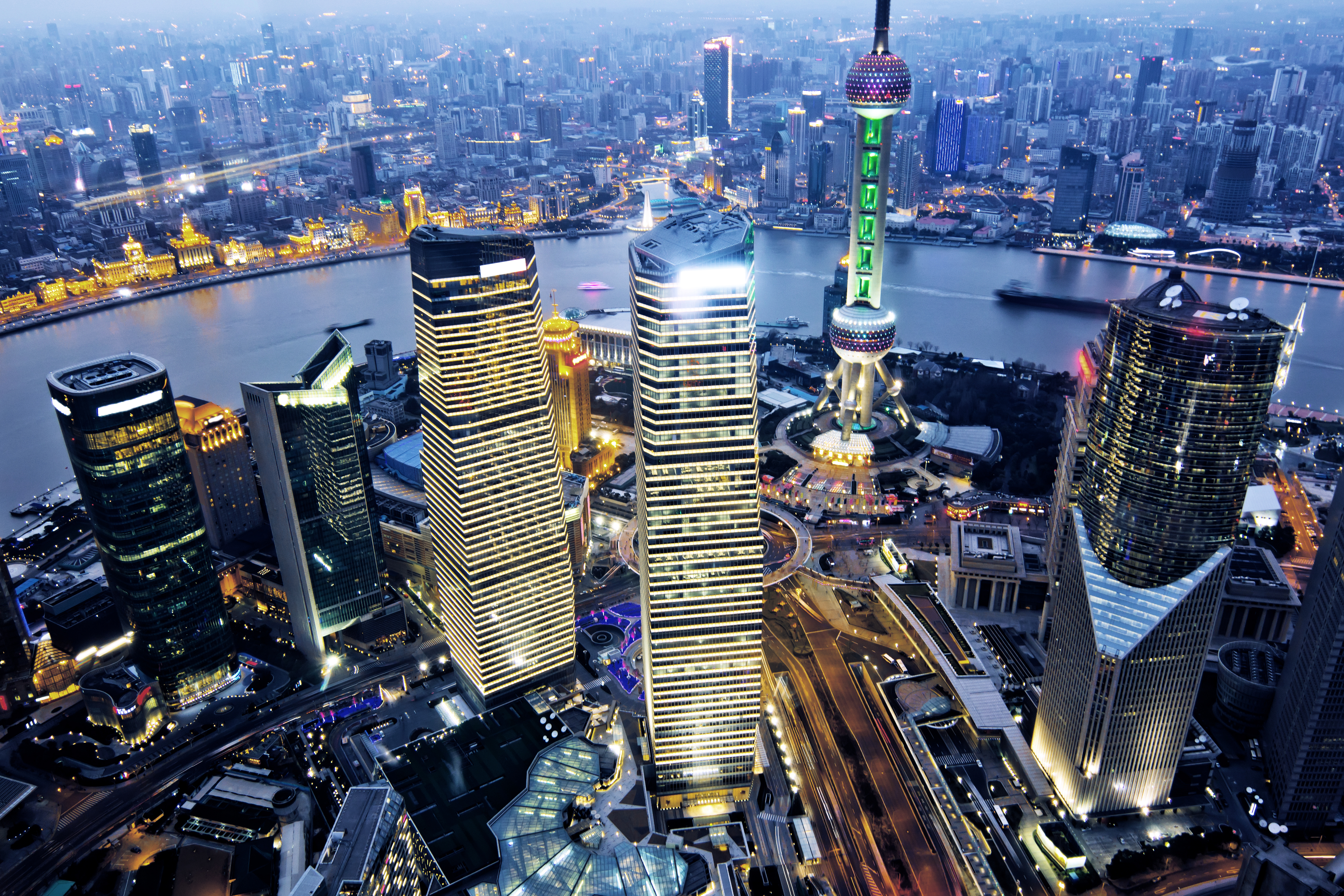
The Shanghai Bund and Lujiazui seen from the Shanghai Tower

The modern PRC is often described by analysts as an example of state capitalism or party-state capitalism, with both market forces and the state playing a major role in the economy. Various state organs manage the economy according to the State Council's five-year plans. China describes its economic system as a socialist market economy, in which the market plays a decisive role in resource allocation under the control of a socialist state. The Chinese economy has expanded more than 20 times since 2000. It is now the second largest economy by GDP (140 trillion yuan) and the largest when adjusted for purchasing power parity. China has brought roughly 800 million people out of extreme poverty, more than any other country in history.

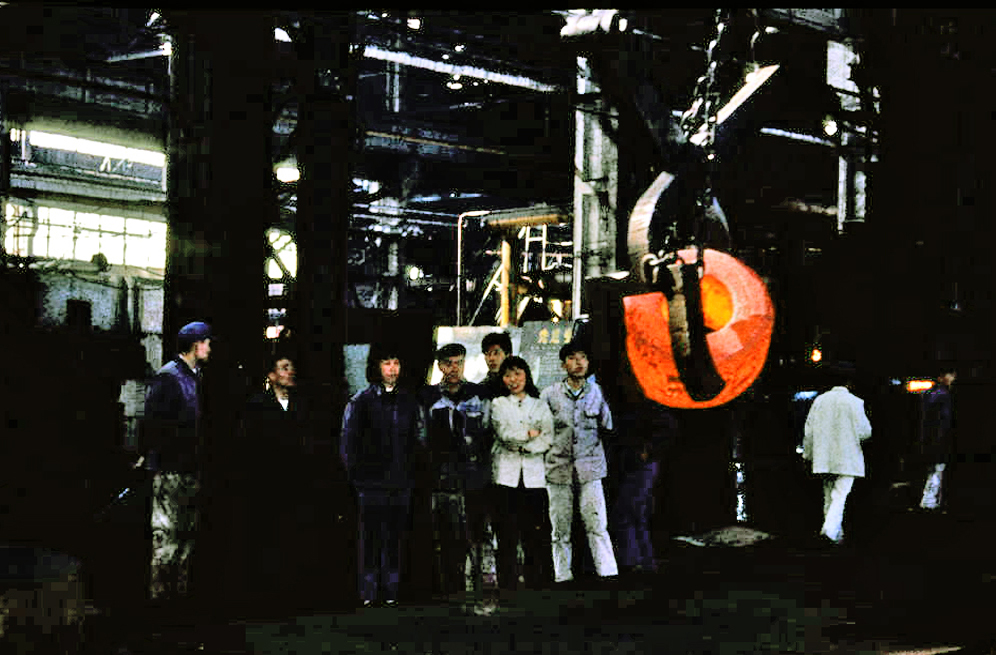
Workers at a steel foundry in Shanghai, 1978

China is the world's leading manufacturing power, accounting for 28% of global manufacturing as of 2024; it is the largest producer of steel, rare earths, ships, and automobiles, as well as the largest exporter of electronics and textiles.

The private sector constitutes the largest portion of the Chinese economy, with about 30–40% under state ownership. State-owned companies make less than 10% of exports, but are predominant in industries such as transportation, utilities, and financial services. Since the 1990s, China has decentralized its economic planning, with about 85% of government spending delegated to the provincial or local level, and local governments adapting national economic plans to suit local interests.

China's main stock exchanges are Shanghai and Shenzhen. Its stock market is the second largest, behind the US. The Chinese banking system makes up a much larger share of the economy than most other countries. Four state-owned banks hold about 40% of the sector's assets as of 2022. China has struggled to establish its currency, the renminbi (in units of yuan), as an international reserve currency; as of 2025, it is the seventh largest currency in foreign exchange reserves.

About a third of China's workforce consists of domestic migrant workers, the floating population. The hukou system restricts citizens' access to services and utilities outside of their registered home, leading to pronounced inequalities between urban and rural workers. Especially in larger cities, only those with local hukou may be able to buy property, though hukou restrictions have loosened significantly in the 21st century.

According to 2026 state data, China's urban unemployment rate was 5.0%. China has a high debt-to-GDP ratio (almost 300% in 2020), with household debt at about 65% of the GDP. China has faced a property sector crisis since 2020. By the late 2010s, Chinese real estate assets far exceed the combined total of stocks, bonds, and deposits.

=== Science and technology ===
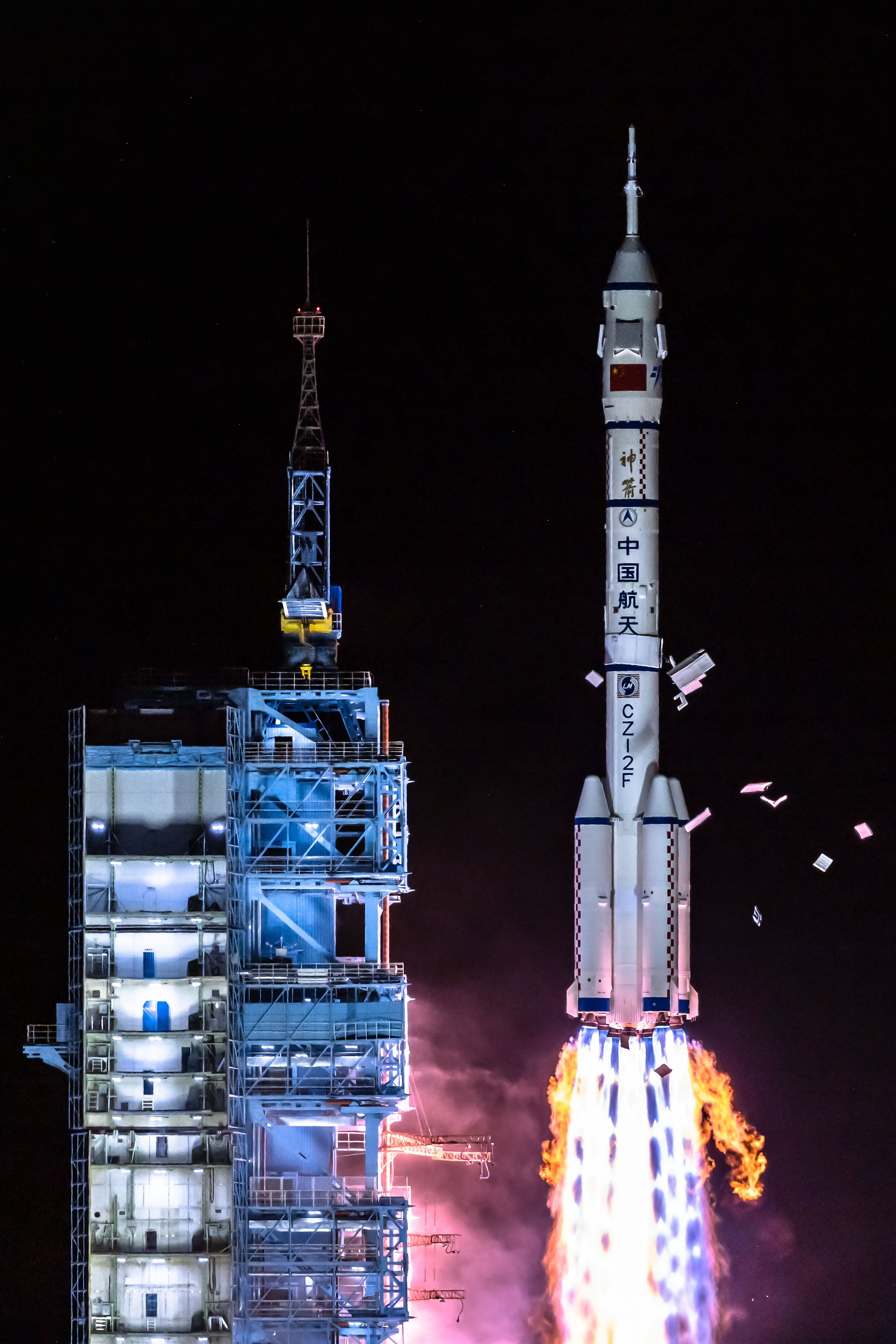
Launch of Shenzhou 13 by a Long March 2F rocket

As the world's largest economy for much of its history, many inventions and scientific discoveries have been produced in China, including paper, printing, the compass, and gunpowder (referred to as the Four Great Inventions). China has pursued rapid technological development since the reform era. It has made great advances in the fields of artificial intelligence, robotics, and biotechnology, while the Xi administration has prioritized green technology and reducing Chinese dependence on foreign technology. It has emphasized technocratic leadership in the 2020s, promoting experts in scientific fields to national leadership positions, while bringing major private technology firms such as Tencent and Alibaba under state regulation. Geopolitical tensions have led Europe and the United States to restrict Chinese access to their technology, especially semiconductors, and launch sanctions targeting the telecommunications and electronics firm Huawei.

Since launching its first satellite in 1970, China has maintained an active space program. After the United States and the Soviet Union, China became the third to independently put astronauts into orbit, with a 2003 mission. The Chinese Lunar Exploration Program has sent multiple robotic landers to the Moon, the Planetary Exploration of China program has sent a lander and rover to Mars, and the Tiangong space station has hosted crewed operations in Low Earth orbit since 2021.

=== Infrastructure and transportation ===
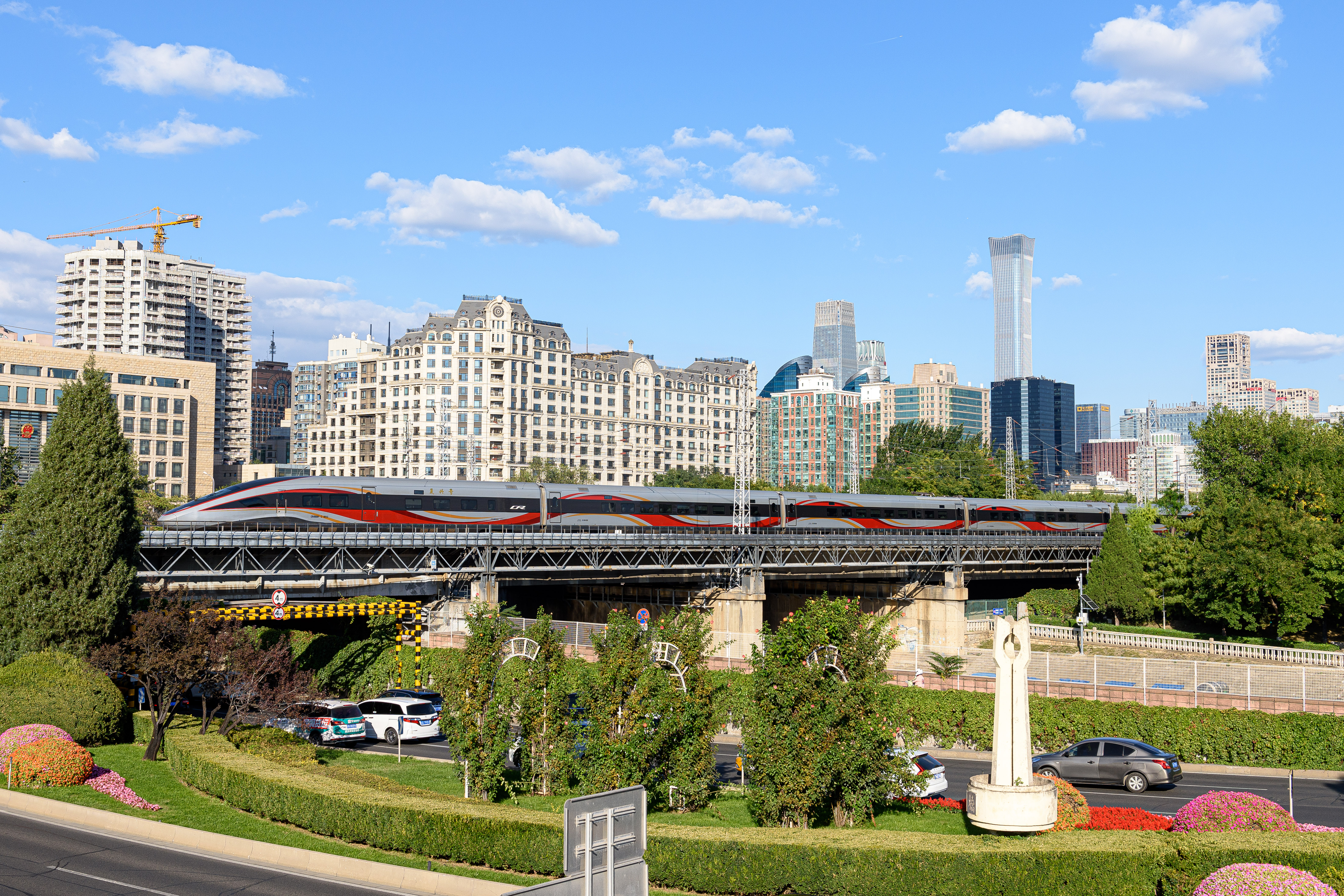
A Fuxing high-speed train running in Beijing

Since the 1990s, automobiles have become a common form of transport in China. According to state data, the Chinese highway network exceeded 6,000,000 km (3,700,000 mi) by the end of 2021, having grown 30% over the past decade. In addition to local and provincial routes, this network includes the national highways, which are divided between the ordinary highways (of various classes) and the national expressway system. China has the largest highway and rail systems in the world by capacity, along with the second longest rail network at roughly 165,000 km (102,526 mi). According to 2022 state data, over 95% of cities exceeding one million residents have access to high-speed rail. Out of the 50 busiest container ports, 18 are located in China, including the world's busiest, the Port of Shanghai. China has the largest domestic aviation market by passenger capacity, and maintains 262 airports as of 2025.

Chinese cities are disparate in their level of infrastructure. Tier-one cities such as Beijing and Shanghai have elaborate and advanced infrastructure networks, while smaller cities and rural areas often have outdated and underfunded transit and public utilities. Water resources in China are unevenly distributed. With industrialization and rapid development, the drier north has faced endemic water shortages. To combat this, the South–North Water Transfer Project pumps water from the Yangtze basin to supply northern cities.

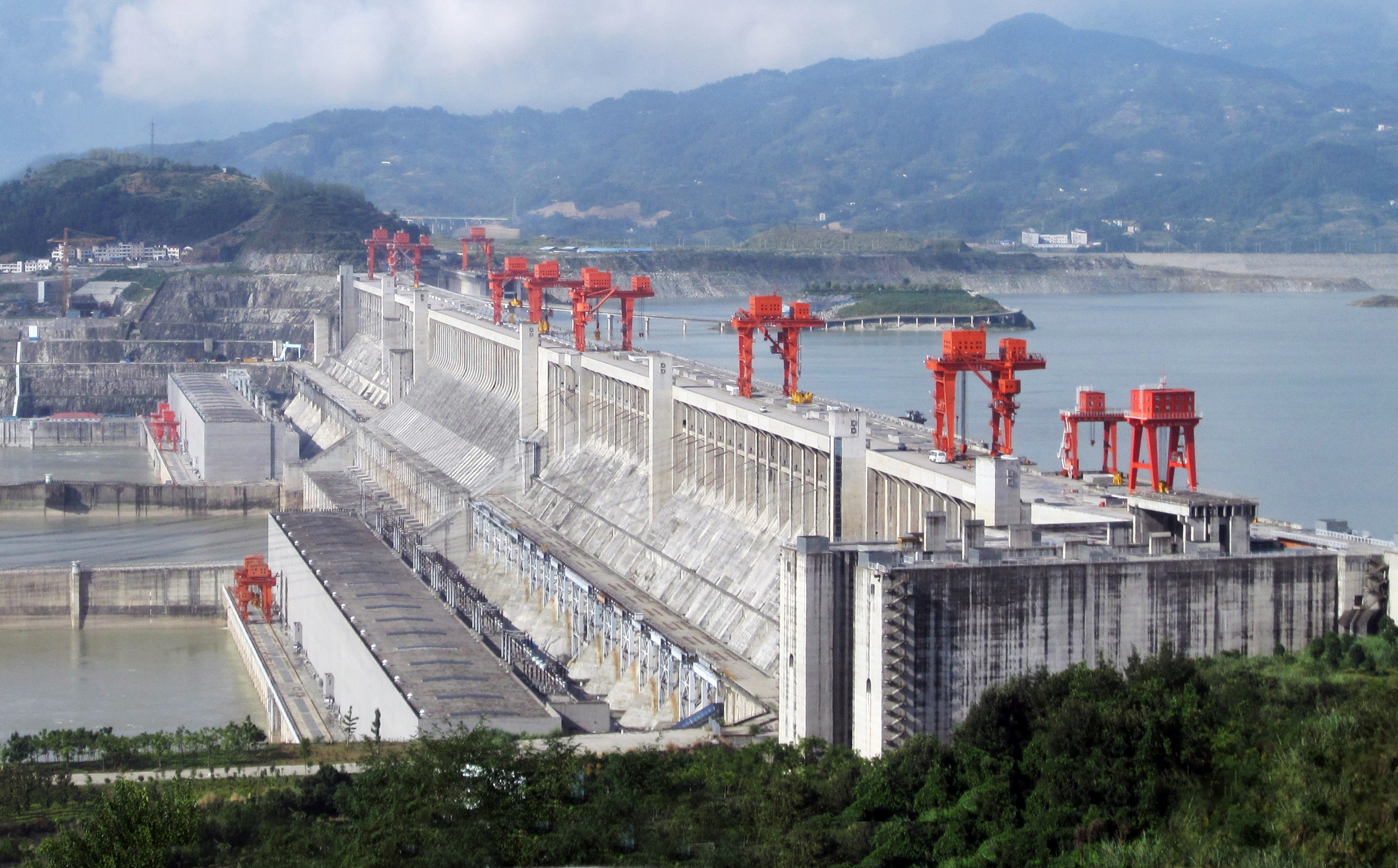
The Three Gorges Dam, the largest hydroelectric dam in the world

The State Grid Corporation of China, the world's largest utility company, manages the electrical grid for most of the country, with the China Southern Power Grid as the electric utility in some southern provinces. Power generation is primarily managed by five state-owned corporations, alongside local and provincial utilities. Most of China's renewable energy comes from hydropower. The Three Gorges Dam is the world's largest power station by capacity.

China has the largest number of internet users and websites of any country. According to state data, it has 1.125 billion internet users as of 2025, about 80% of its population. It has an extensive system of internet censorship. The Great Firewall, a system of internet controls and regulations, blocks access to many foreign websites. Users can circumvent it through virtual private networks, but these face occasional crackdowns. The Cyberspace Administration of China is the national internet regulator and censor. Most telecommunications are operated by state-owned companies.

== Demographics ==
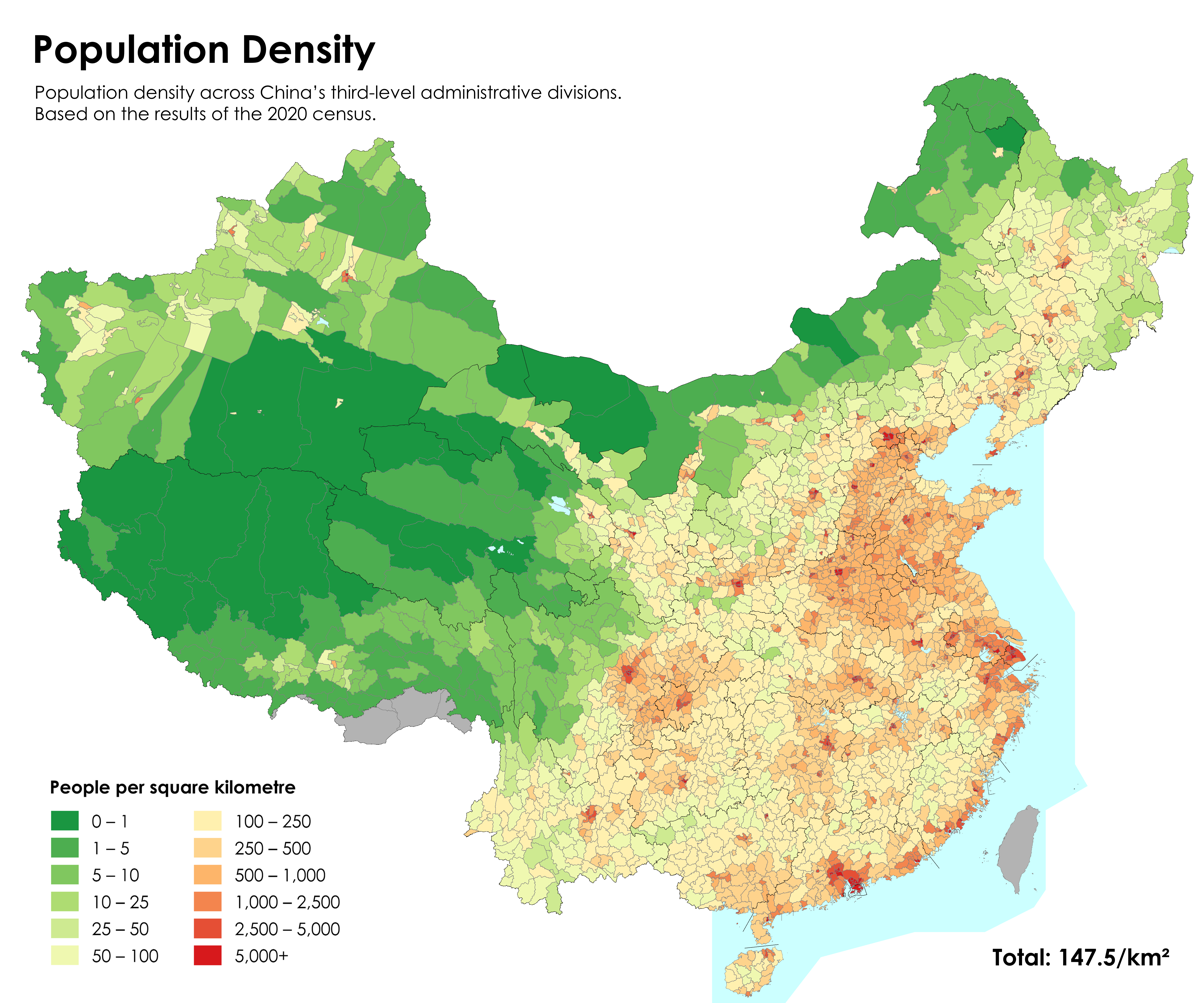
Map of China's population density across third-level administrative divisions. Based on the results of the 2020 census.

The 2020 Chinese census recorded the population as 1,411,778,724. About 17.95% were 14 years old or younger, 63.35% were between 15 and 59, and 18.7% were over 60. Between 2010 and 2020, the average population growth rate was 0.53%. Since 2022, deaths have outpaced births. China has one of the lowest total fertility rates (births per woman) in the world, around 1.0 as of 2025. China has a rapidly aging population: the proportion of Chinese over 65 is predicted to reach 26% by 2050, which would create a large economic and social burden from increased need for caretakers and medical assistance.

The National Bureau of Statistics estimated that the population fell 850,000 from 2021 to 2022, the first decline since 1961. In 2025, China recorded 5.6 births per 1000 people, the lowest recorded birthrate since at least 1949. China's population is concentrated in the eastern half of the country; although 64% of China's territory is west of the Heihe–Tengchong Line, as of 2020 only 6.5% of its population lives west of the line.

Spurred by fears of overpopulation, China maintained a one-child policy from 1979 to 2015, restricting most families to a single child. The policy was most strictly enforced in urban areas, while families from ethnic minorities and rural communities were often exempt from one-child limits. A two-child policy was introduced in 2015, and in July 2021, family size limits as well as penalties for exceeding them were removed. The policy resulted in a skewed sex ratio, as many families preferred to have sons, who were able to continue the patrilineal line and were perceived as better able to support the family. Through a combination of infanticide, sex-selective abortion, and unreported female births, there were 120 boys born for every 100 girls by the late 1990s.

China maintains a restrictive immigration policy, with permanent residence granted to only around 12,000 foreigners as of 2023, while an additional 845,697 foreign nationals lived in mainland China as of the 2020 census. The Chinese diaspora is among the largest on earth, comprising about 40 million people, mostly descended from emigrants during the 19th and early 20th centuries. About two-thirds of this diaspora reside in Indonesia, Thailand, Malaysia, and the United States. The number of people living outside mainland China who were born in mainland China is at 10.5 million.

=== Cities and urbanization ===
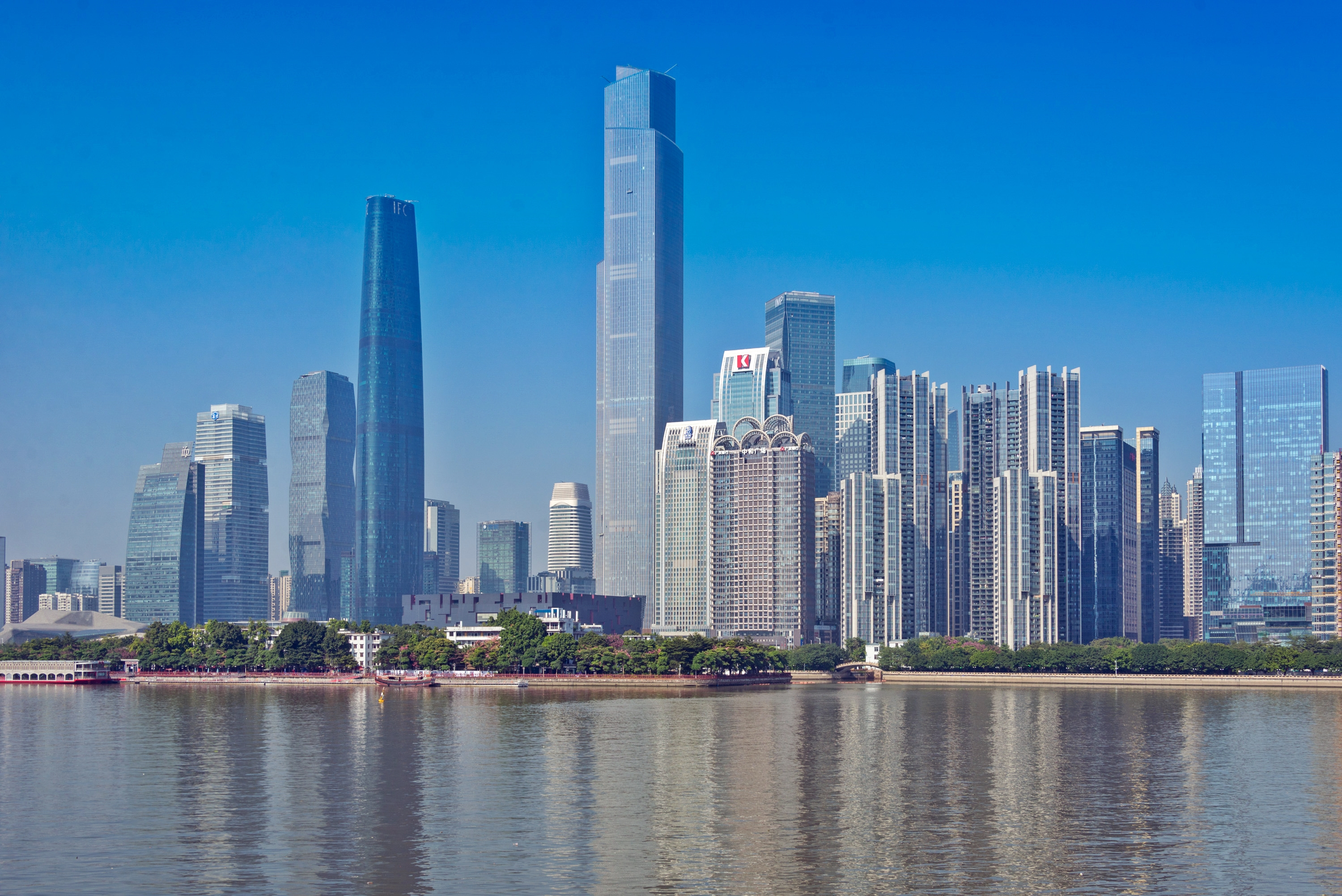
Guangzhou, a major transportation hub and one of China's three largest cities

China has urbanized significantly since the 1980s. The percentage of the country's population living in urban areas increased from 20% in 1980 to over 68% in 2025, according to Chinese government figures, while the United Nations calculates the 2025 urbanization rate as 83.7%. Cities in China often include smaller towns and rural areas under their jurisdiction. Shanghai is its most populous city by urban area. Two urban agglomerations, the Pearl Delta and Yangtze Delta, contain many of the largest cities and tens of millions of people.

The figures below are from the 2020 census and are only estimates of the urban populations within administrative city limits; a different ranking exists for total municipal populations. The large floating population of migrant workers make conducting censuses in urban areas difficult.

Largest cities or municipalities in China China Urban Construction Statistical Yearbook 2020 Urban population and urban temporary population (Note: Population of Hong Kong as of 2018 estimate) (Note: The data for Chongqing refers to its "Metropolitan Developed Economic Area", excluding outlying counties of the larger municipality.)
Rank	Name	Province	Pop.	Rank	Name	Province	Pop.
1	Shanghai	SH	24,281,400	11	Hong Kong	HK	7,448,900
2	Beijing	BJ	19,164,000	12	Zhengzhou	HA	7,179,400
3	Guangzhou	GD	13,858,700	13	Nanjing	JS	6,823,500
4	Shenzhen	GD	13,438,800	14	Xi'an	SN	6,642,100
5	Tianjin	TJ	11,744,400	15	Jinan	SD	6,409,600
6	Chongqing	CQ	11,488,000	16	Shenyang	LN	5,900,000
7	Dongguan	GD	9,752,500	17	Qingdao	SD	5,501,400
8	Chengdu	SC	8,875,600	18	Harbin	HL	5,054,500
9	Wuhan	HB	8,652,900	19	Hefei	AH	4,750,100
10	Hangzhou	ZJ	8,109,000	20	Changchun	JL	4,730,900

=== Languages and ethnic groups ===
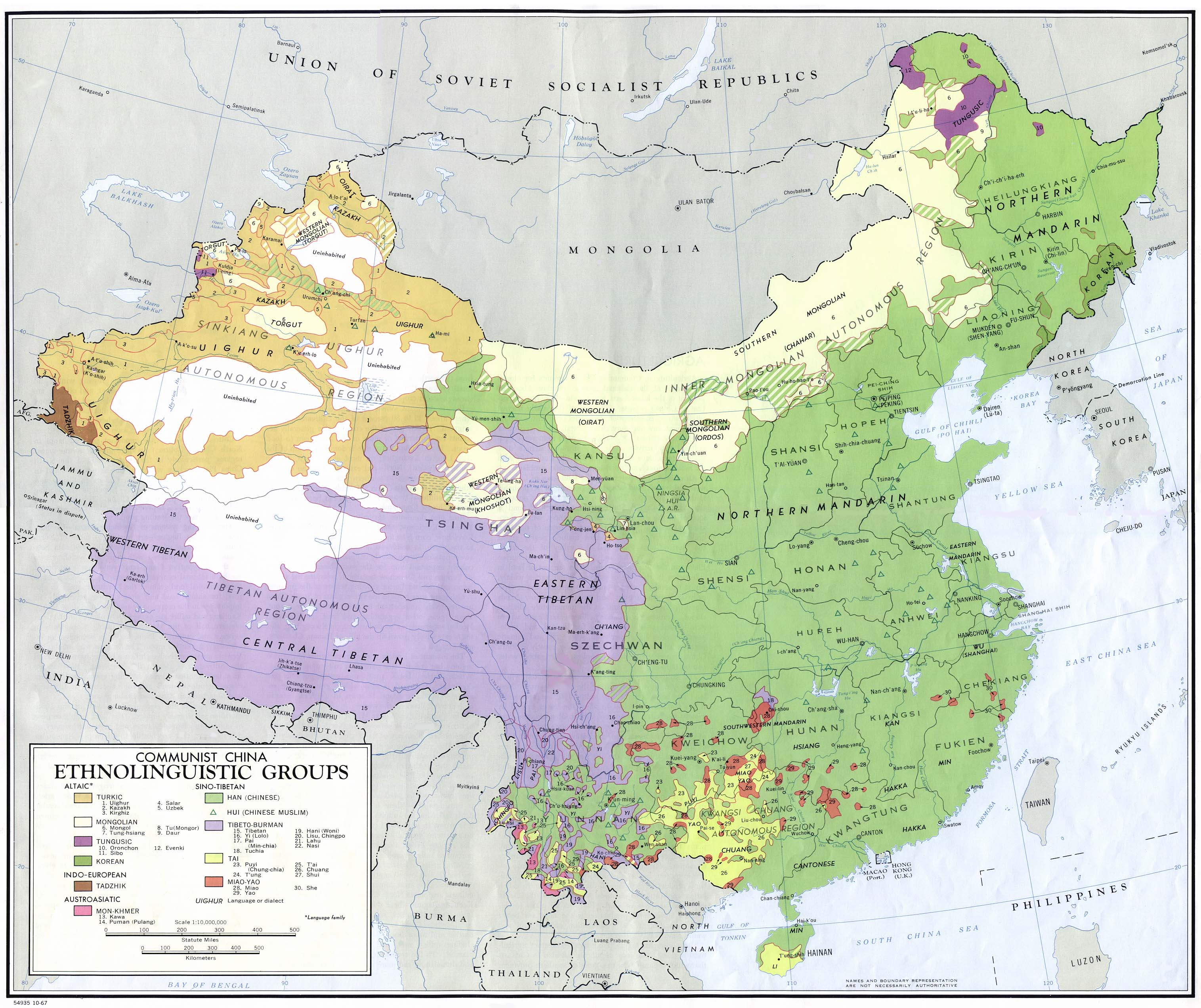
An ethnolinguistic map of China (1967), illustrating the geographic distribution of language families and ethnic groups

China legally recognizes 56 distinct ethnic groups. The largest of these are the Han Chinese, who constitute more than 91% of the total population. Ethnic minority groups are generally found in the western and border regions of China. Social and wealth inequalities exist between many minority groups and the Han, especially in the rural southwestern areas. The Zhuang of the southwest are the most populous minority group; other major groups include the Uyghurs, Hui, Mongols, and Tibetans.

Most Han are speakers of Mandarin Chinese. Standard Chinese, largely based off the Beijing dialect, is the official language of China. Around 300 million people speak other Chinese languages (often described as 方言—local varieties or dialects—in Chinese sources). While also written with Chinese characters, these are not highly mutually intelligible with Mandarin or each other. Major branches of Chinese include Mandarin, Wu, Yue (Cantonese), Min, Gan, Hakka, and Xiang; the latter six are mainly spoken in Southern China. Since the 1950s, local dialects have steadily assimilated into Mandarin or one of the main regional registers.

Simplified Chinese characters, first standardized in the 1950s, are used to write Chinese throughout mainland China, while traditional Chinese characters remain in use in the SARs and Taiwan. Hanyu Pinyin is the official romanization system for Chinese in the PRC.

Other language families are found throughout China. Distantly related to Chinese, Tibeto-Burman languages are found in the west and southwest. In southwestern China, many Hmong–Mien and Kra–Dai languages are spoken by minority groups. Offshoots of the Austroasiatic and Austronesian language families are also found in the south in smaller numbers. In the northwest, Turkic (including Uyghur) and Mongolic languages are found, as well as two Indo-European languages (Russian and Tajik). Several Tungusic languages are found in northwestern and northeastern China. Since the 2010s, the Chinese government has intensified linguistic assimilation policies, generally requiring schools to use Standard Chinese.

=== Religion ===
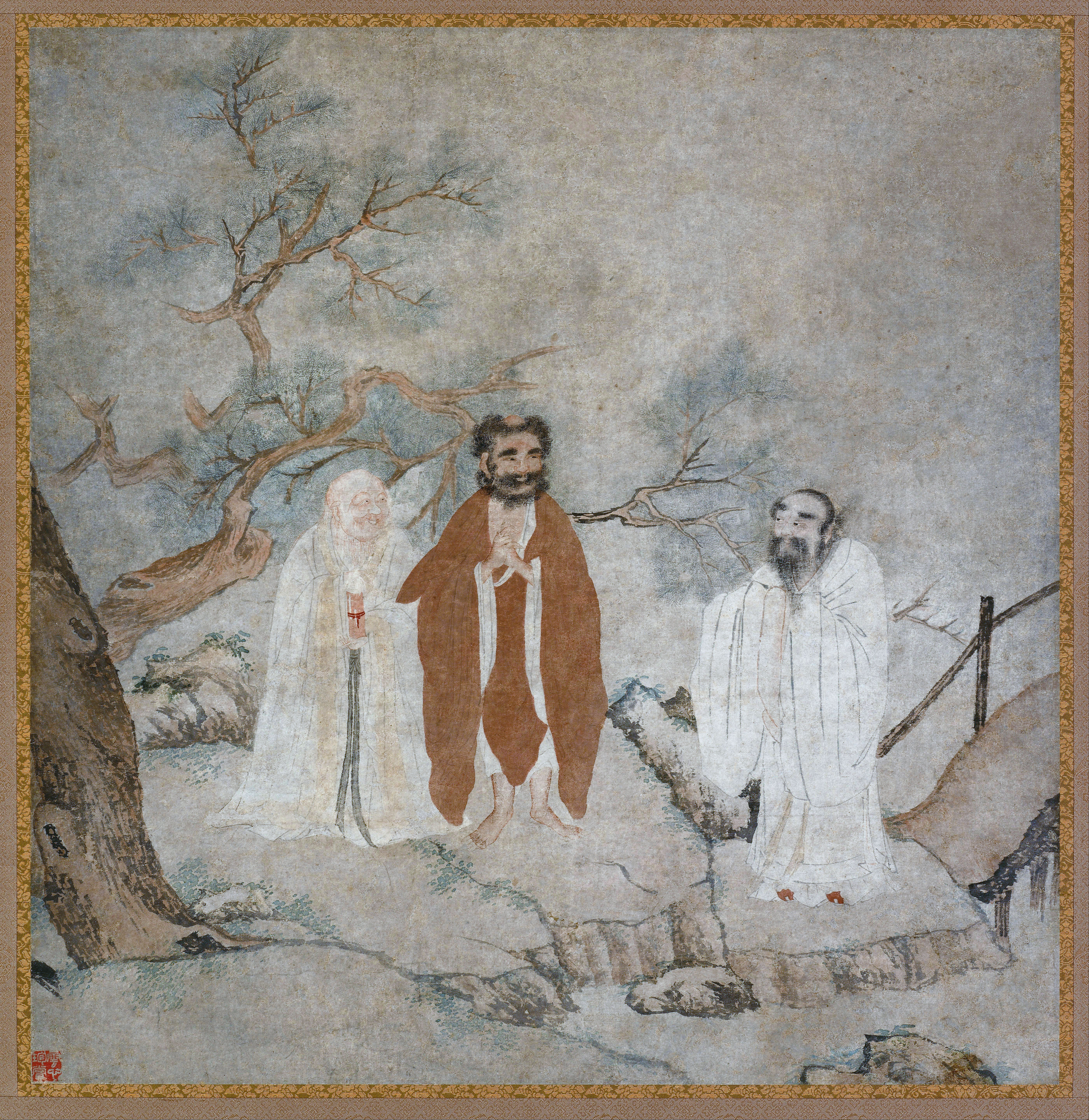
Ming dynasty painting depicting the sages of the three teachings: the Buddha, Laozi, and Confucius

The Chinese religious tradition is heavily syncretic, incorporating various folk religious practices alongside Confucianism, Taoism, and Buddhism. These 'three teachings' were the three main institutionalized schools of Chinese religion. These exist alongside introduced minority religions such as Christianity and Islam, as well as various new religious movements. Statistics on affiliation are difficult to gather due to varying definitions of religion and the diffusive nature of local traditions. Many people follow religious teachings and practices without considering themselves adherents. Local deities are commonly worshiped alongside widely known gods, such as Guan Yu and Mazu.

Confucianism is a philosophical and spiritual tradition that originated in the Eastern Zhou, emphasizing the study of the classics and the relations of the individual, society, and heaven. It has sometimes been identified as a religion, following Western influences. Daoism emphasizes the Dao ('way') as the world's origin and fundamental force, and seeks to harness it through spiritual cultivation. Initially a philosophical movement during the Eastern Zhou, the religious tradition of Daoism emerged during the 2nd century CE. Mahayana Buddhism was introduced to China during the Han dynasty and spread rapidly over the following centuries. Although often dismissed by Confucian elites, Buddhism greatly influenced other Chinese religious and philosophical traditions.

Although China and CCP are legally atheist, freedom of religion is formally guaranteed by the Chinese constitution. China officially recognizes five religions: Buddhism, Taoism, Islam, Catholicism, and Protestantism. Formal religious practice is managed by "patriotic associations" for each of the recognized faiths overseen by the CCP's United Front Work Department. However, the majority of religious activities take place outside of registered organizations. China has attempted to crack down on some forms of unregistered practice, such as Protestant house churches. Religious practices among minority groups, such as Islam among the Uyghur and Tibetan Buddhism, have come under state scrutiny and regulation over fears of separatism.

=== Education ===
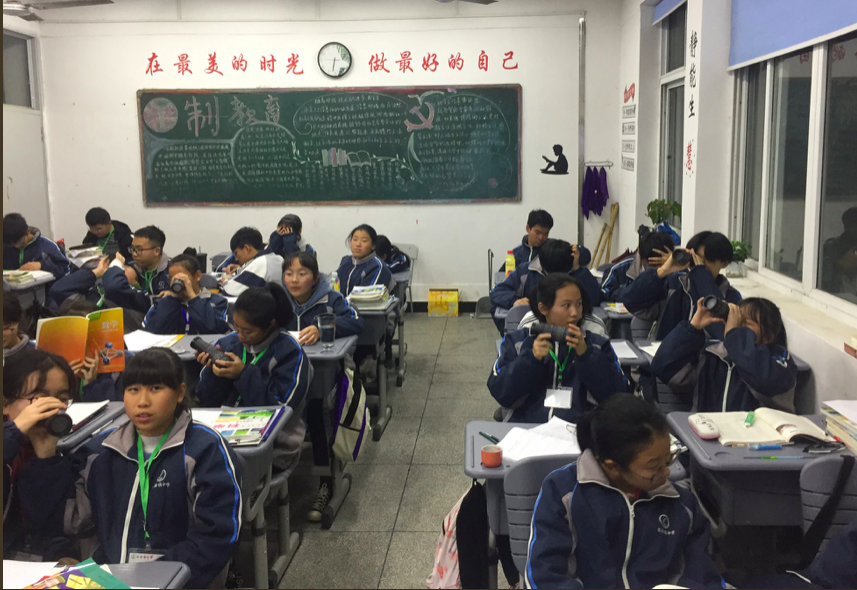
Students at a junior high school classroom in Zhejiang, 2019

Following an optional two to three years of preschool, China has nine years of free compulsory education, generally with six years of elementary school and three years of junior high school. If they pass entrance examinations, students may then attend a senior high school, choosing between an academic or vocational track. The gaokao exams allow access to undergraduate higher education, with additional examinations required to attend postgraduate programs. As of 2022, 95% of junior high students continue to high school, while higher education has a 59.6% enrollment rate.

As of 2022, China had 158 million students enrolled in compulsory school, and 46.5 million enrolled in higher education. There are over 200,000 elementary and junior high schools, over 22,000 secondary schools, and over 3,000 colleges and universities. Both private and public schools exist at all levels, with 10.6% of elementary and junior high students attending private schools. China became the world's largest publisher of scientific papers in 2016. Foreign language programs are mandatory from 3rd grade. Generally focused on English, other languages are increasingly being taught, especially at the senior high level.

=== Health ===
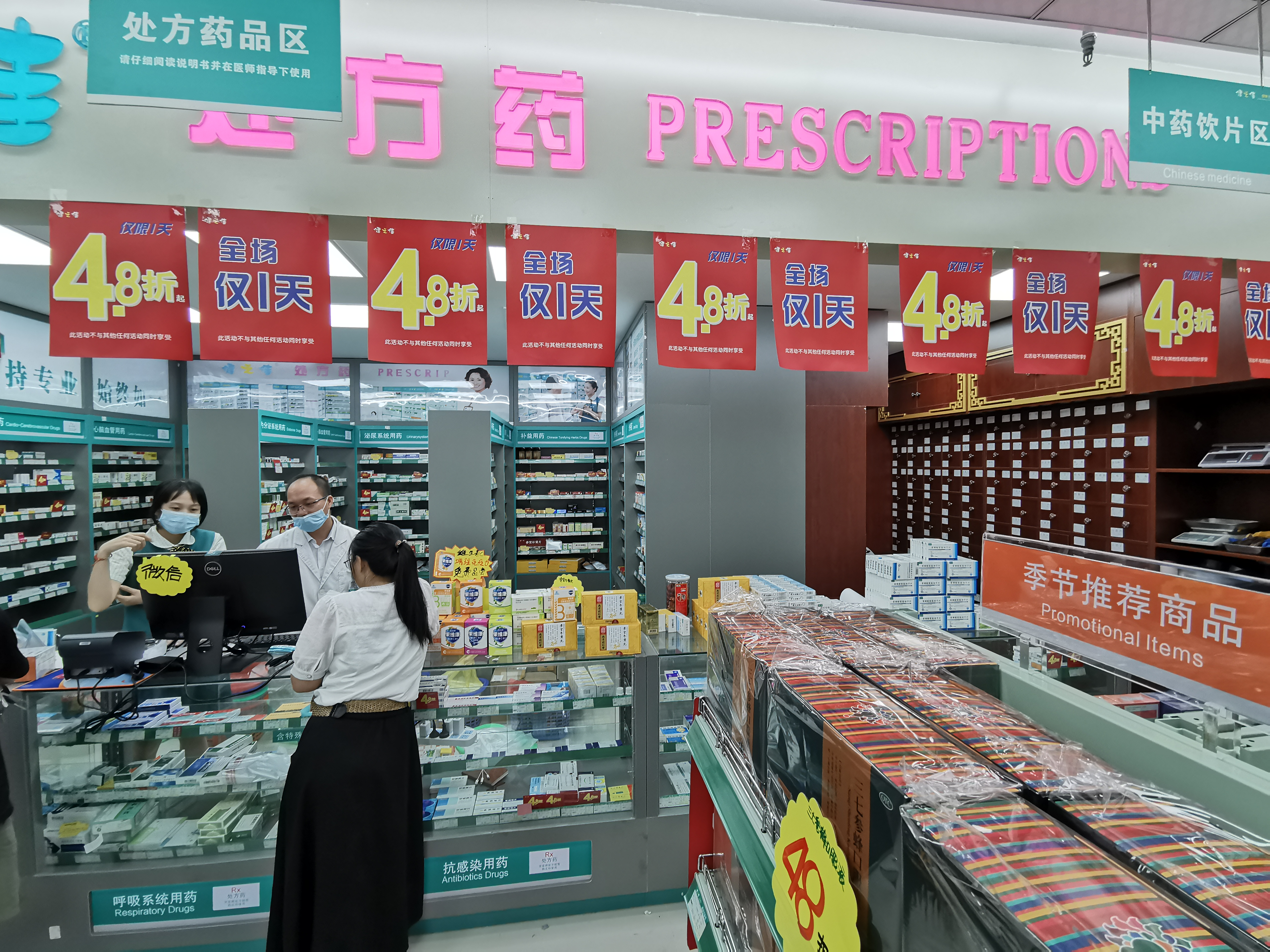
A pharmacy in Guangxi, selling both Western and traditional Chinese medicine

The vast majority of primary health care institutions in China offer both allopathic and traditional Chinese medicine (TCM). In 2017, there were approximately 9,000 community health centers in urban areas—which oversaw roughly 25,000 health stations—and 37,000 township health centers in rural areas. There were about 639,000 village clinics, which operate as independent, for-profit enterprises subsidized by the state.

The National Health Commission, together with its local counterparts, oversees health policy. After the beginning of reform and opening-up in 1978, Chinese public health improved rapidly from better nutrition, although many free health services provided in the countryside disappeared. Healthcare in China became mostly privatized and experienced a significant quality increase. China is a major producer and exporter of active pharmaceutical ingredients.

According to 2025 state data, the life expectancy at birth exceeds 79 years, and the infant mortality rate is 4 per 1,000. Rates of stunted growth declined from 33.1% in 1990 to 4.5% in 2024. Mental health services are underfunded and unevenly distributed. The COVID-19 pandemic was first identified in Wuhan. China maintained a zero-COVID policy, using lockdowns, quarantines, and contact tracing to curb its transmission, until protests in November–December 2022.

== Culture ==
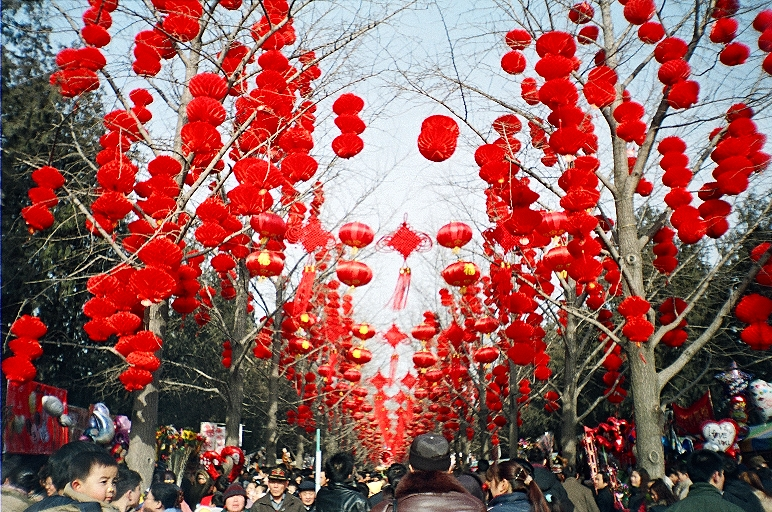
Red paper lanterns hung up for Chinese New Year festivities in Beijing

Beginning in the Qin and Han dynasties and continuing over the following millennia, an area of Chinese cultural influence grew to encompass much of East Asia. Japan, Korea, and Vietnam adopted various political, philosophical, religious, and aesthetic concepts from China, facilitated by their adoption of Chinese characters and participation in the tributary system. China has 60 World Heritage Sites, including the Great Wall and Grand Canal, the second most of any country (behind Italy).

Chinese culture has historically emphasized family connections, with filial piety and the veneration of ancestors seen as vital duties under Confucian ethics. Prior to the 20th century, family relations were highly patriarchal, and arranged marriages were commonplace. The CCP pushed for gender equality after coming to power, establishing the All-China Women's Federation to manage women's issues. However, many patriarchal gender norms remain prevalent, and women face lower employment rates and occupational gender segregation.

Prior to the adoption of the Gregorian calendar in 1912, China traditionally used a 12-month lunisolar calendar. The 60-part sexagenary cycle was often used to enumerate days as well as years, alongside the twelve-year Chinese zodiac. Major holidays and festivals in China include the Chinese New Year (or Spring Festival), the Qingming Festival, the Mid-Autumn Festival, and National Day.

=== Art ===
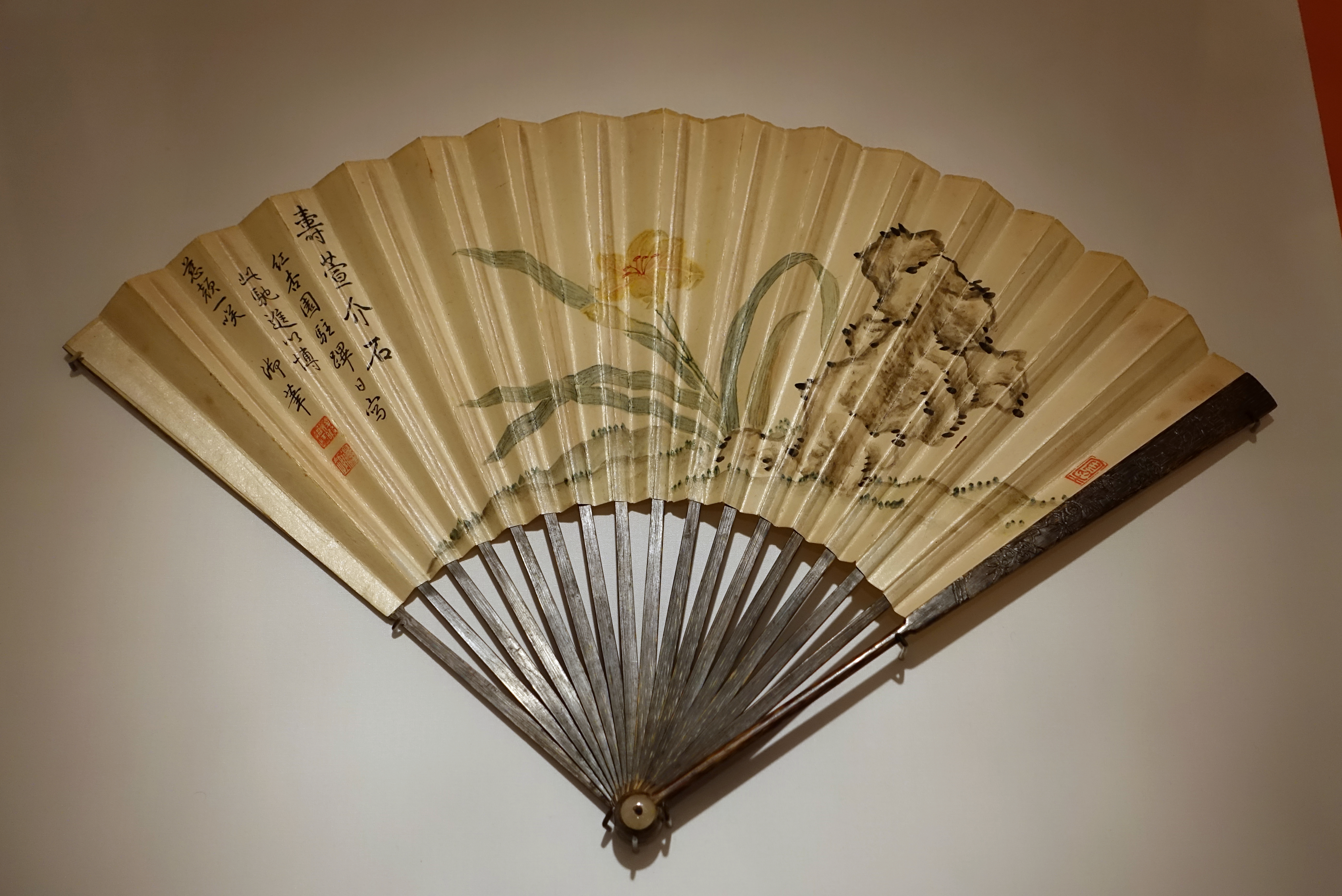
An 18th-century hand fan with a poem and nature painting

Traditional Chinese art makes use of a wide array of common motifs, metaphors, and symbols, often using nature as allegory. During the imperial era, skill in art was a marker of refinement and high social status. By the Song period, landscape paintings became among the most prestigious genres. Renowned art pieces often bear inscriptions and seals from their previous owners, allowing for the tracing of provenance over long periods of time.

Chinese paintings are traditionally made with ink brushes on paper or silk. Horizontal handscrolls and vertical hanging scrolls are common formats, alongside wall paintings, folding screens and hand fans. Calligraphy, emerging during the 3rd and 4th centuries CE, was traditionally regarded in China as the most prestigious form of art, and remains among the most widely practiced. Western painting styles gained popularity during the early 20th century, while the Mao government promoted art as a means to embody socialist ideals. The 21st century has seen a boom in the international influence of Chinese contemporary art.

Pottery and metal crafts in China date to ancient times. Porcelain, also known as china, became a common form of ceramic during the 7th century. By the 14th century, it became popular to decorate porcelain vessels with elaborate blue and white patterns, which became the most popular form of Chinese ceramics. Jade crafts and lacquerware have been common decorative mediums since antiquity.

==== Architecture ====
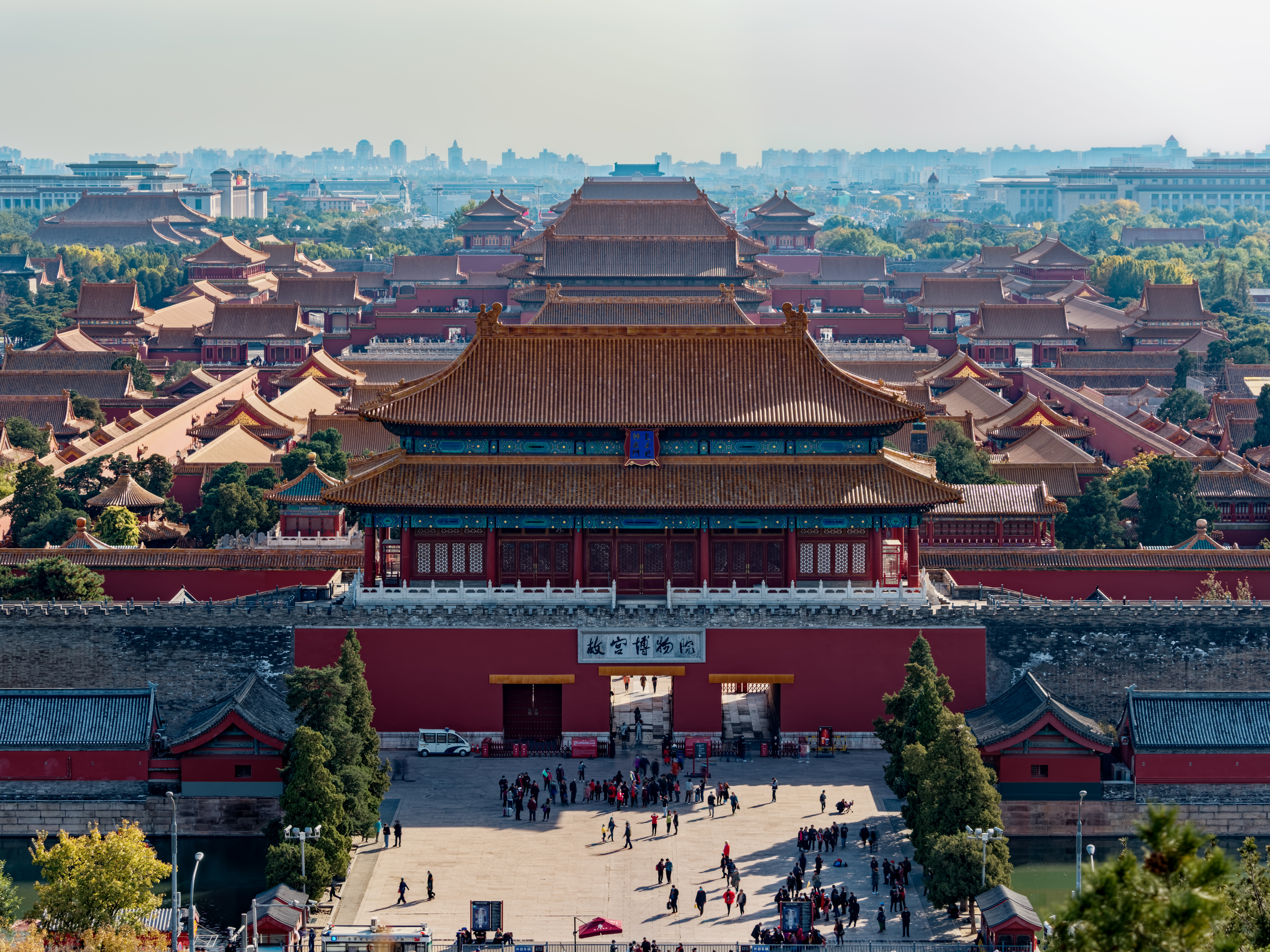
The Forbidden City in Beijing, with the Gate of Divine Prowess at center

Wood is the most commonly used material in traditional Chinese architecture. Roofs of important buildings, generally ceramic tile, are often ornate and hipped. Traditional buildings are often arranged around cardinal directions, with grandeur expressed through large complexes, often featuring courtyards and large gates. The spiritual concept of feng shui influences the layout of houses and settlements, oriented around the flow of qi, vital energy.

Pagodas, multi-story religious towers far taller than other forms of traditional architecture, were introduced to China alongside Buddhism, and comprise many of China's oldest buildings. Western-style architecture was introduced during the 1800s, while domestic architects began to implement Western design principles in the 1900s. The reform era has seen a boom in contemporary skyscrapers and offices, which have largely supplanted traditional architecture.

==== Performing arts ====
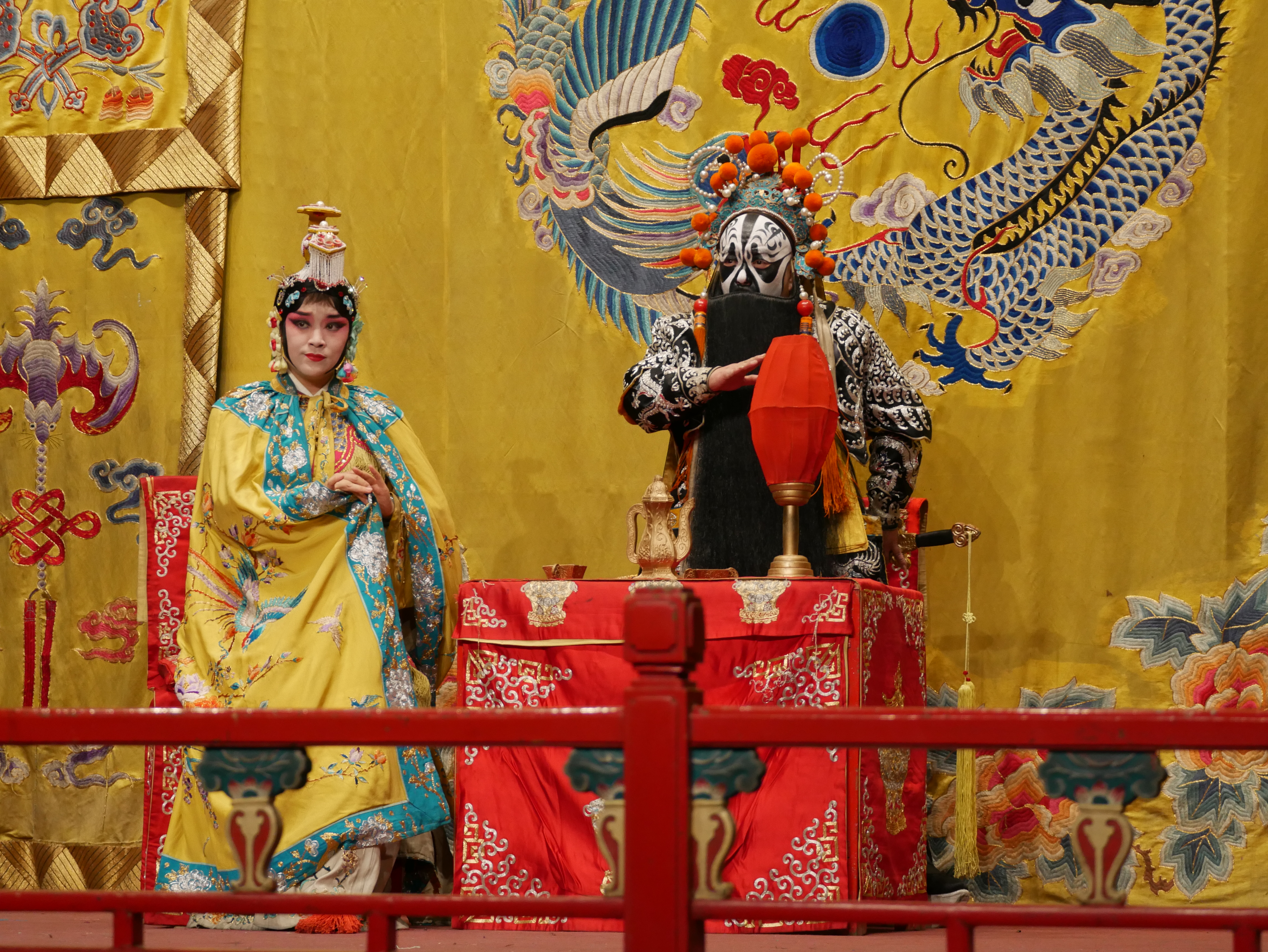
Two actors in a performance of Farewell My Concubine, a Peking opera

The music of China is highly diverse and regional. Traditional Chinese music uses a wide variety of instruments, including the dizi (a flute), erhu (a bowed string instrument), guqin (a plucked string instrument), guzheng (a plucked zither), pipa (a lute), sheng (a mouth organ), suona (a wind instrument), and various types of bells and drums. Western-style music spread during the early 20th century, leading the Chinese orchestra to develop as a fusion of Western orchestral music with Chinese instruments. Western classical music remains highly prestigious. Inspired by Western jazz and boosted by the introduction of recording studios, Mandarin pop music emerged in Shanghai in the 1920s, while the folk rock-inspired Cantopop became popular around Hong Kong during the 1970s. After reform and opening-up, various forms of pop and rock music reached widespread popularity.

Chinese opera emerged from shuochang, folk narrative singing traditions. Influenced by various regional traditions and kunqu, a genre popular during the Ming dynasty, Peking opera reached national popularity during the Qing dynasty, while various local and regional forms of opera emerged across the country. Maoist China promoted revolutionary opera and communist-oriented folk music.

By the Han period, Chinese dance was a frequent subject of art and poetry, as well as an element of religious rites. Dancers often performed for the imperial courts, while Chinese opera dances led to increasing numbers of dance troupes across all levels of society during the Qing. Western dances gained popularity in the early 20th century, while the CCP promoted folk dances such as yangge.

=== Cuisine ===
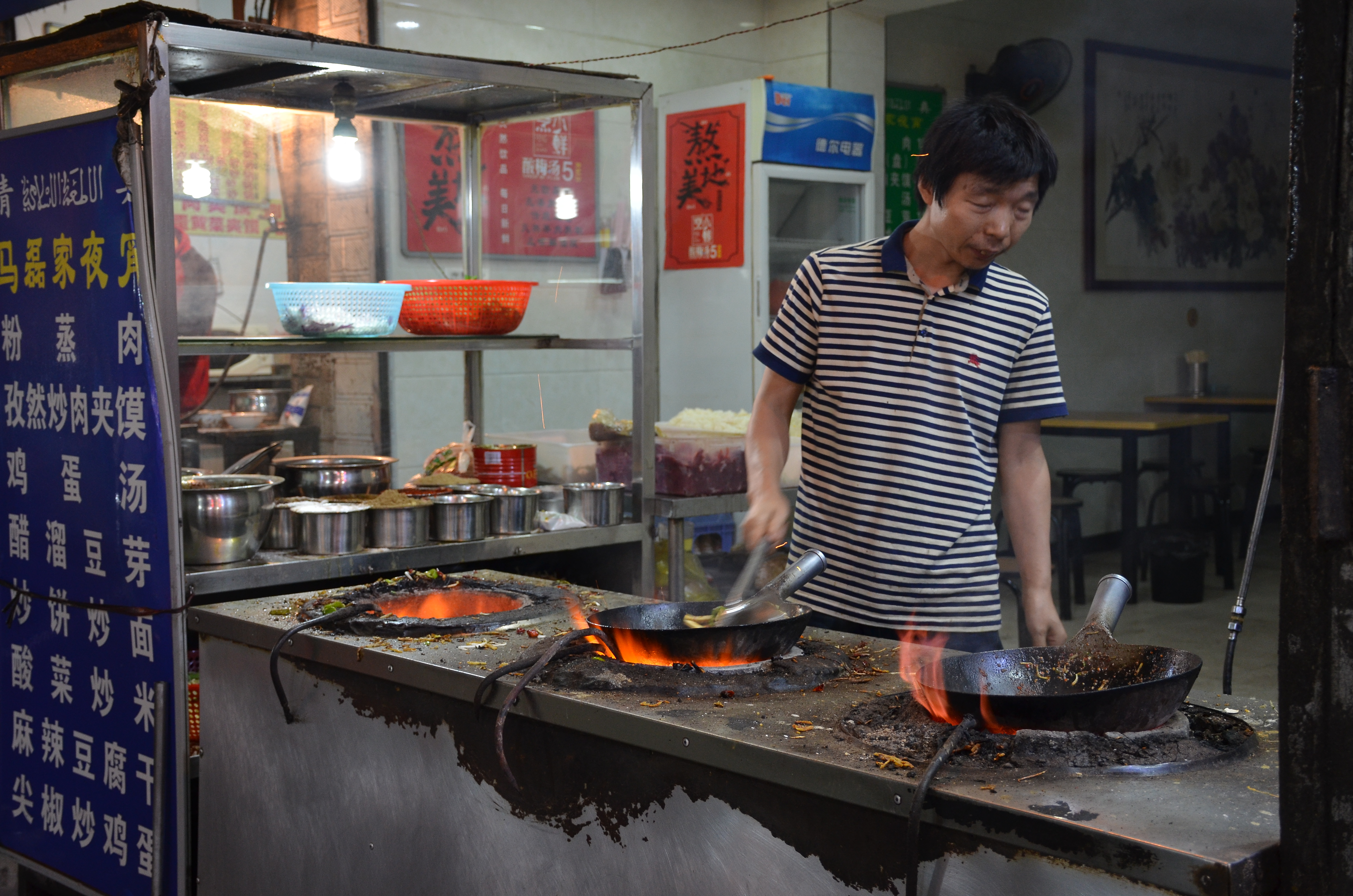
A man at a Chinese Muslim restaurant in Xi'an preparing food in woks

Chinese meals generally incorporate a grain (fan) alongside meat or vegetable-based dishes (cai). Flour—as steamed buns, dumplings, pancakes, or noodles—is the primary grain in the north, alongside maize, millet, rice, and in some regions, sorghum. Rice—steamed or in the form of congee, rice noodles or rice cakes—dominates in the south. Although Chinese cuisine is highly diverse and regional, pork, chicken, fish, and duck are the most common meats. Soybeans are a common staple nationally made into products such as tofu and soy sauce. Stir frying in woks is the most common cooking method, alongside deep-frying, steaming, and hot pot, where dishes are cooked in simmering broth at the table.

People in China generally eat three meals a day, often with a simple breakfast and a more elaborate dinner. Chopsticks are the main eating utensil. Dishes are usually served to be shared among multiple people, rather than served in individual portions. Hot tea almost always accompanies meals across the country, in lieu of water. Alcohol such as rice wines and the distilled liquor baijiu are commonly served with meals. Chinese cuisine was traditionally divided into four great traditions: Lu (Shandong), Yang (Jiangsu), Chuan (Sichuan), and Yue (Guangdong). Chinese Buddhists have developed a unique cuisine that avoids meat, while Chinese Islamic cuisine excludes pork and alcohol.

=== Fashion ===
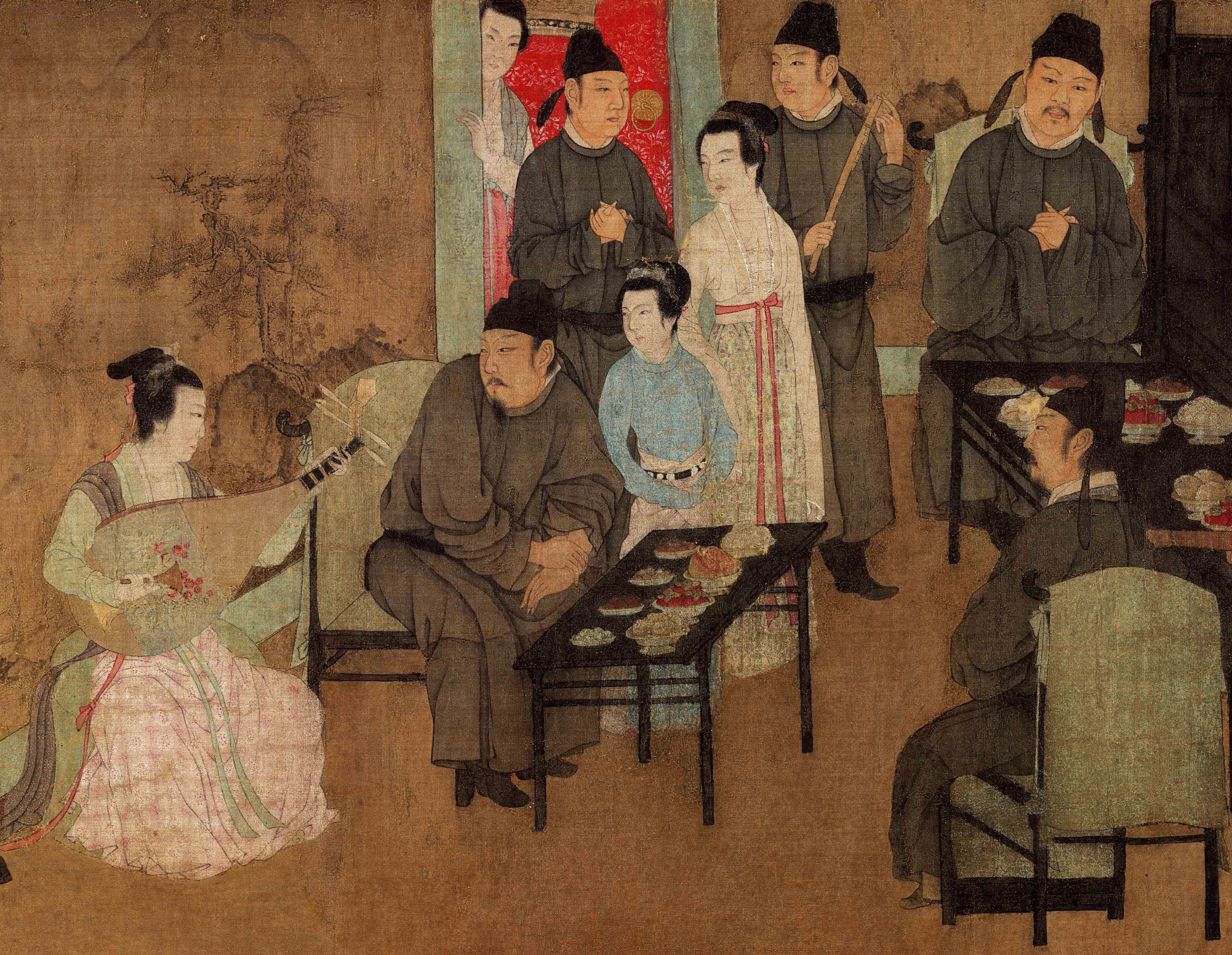
Traditional clothing in a Song dynasty painting

Various forms of robe served as the main form of clothing for men and women throughout Chinese history, adapting over the centuries. Silk, hemp, and later cotton were the main textiles. Both men and women generally bound their hair with caps or pins, except during periods where foreign hairstyles were enforced by the elite.

Chinese fashions changed greatly during the 20th century, as traditional designs largely gave way to Western clothing. The qipao became a popular form of women's dress during the early 20th century, but are today rare outside of formal occasions. After a focus on simple, practical clothing during the Mao era, the reform era saw the emergence of a Western-style fashion industry. In the 21st century, the Hanfu Movement has sought to promote a reconstructed form of traditional Chinese clothing.

=== Literature ===
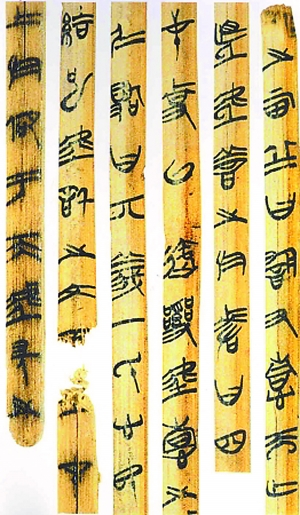
Bamboo slips from the Warring States period, containing part of a commentary on the Classic of Poetry

China has among the longest continuous literary traditions in the world. Late Shang-era oracle bone inscriptions are the oldest known form of Chinese writing, while the oldest surviving literary works—such as the Book of Documents—date to the early Zhou. The Chinese literary canon was historically centered on the Five Classics (ancient transmitted texts) and the Four Books (central Confucian texts). Writings on history were ubiquitous and closely connected to literature since ancient times, seen as a way to guide later generations.

The literati regarded literature as primarily didactic, with fiction seen as useless and potentially corruptive. However, poetry was viewed highly for its ability to convey the nature of reality. The poetry of the Tang era was particularly prized in later dynasties. Before the early 20th century, fiction was generally written in vernacular Chinese, with formal works generally in Classical Chinese. Popular vernacular literature spread with the introduction of printing, resulting in works such as the Four Classic Novels of the Ming and Qing periods.

Modern Chinese literature has been heavily influenced by the political upheavals of the 19th and 20th centuries, seeking to explain the political climate or imagine its future. New Culture writers such as Lu Xun promoted the importance of fiction and vernacular Chinese, experimenting with new modernist forms, while writers of the Reform era sought to explain the trauma of the Mao era. Chinese online literature has become popular alongside the growth of the internet, with about half of Chinese internet users regularly consuming it.

=== Media ===
China's largest media company is China Central Television, which competes with various provincial television networks. China is the largest online video market, with its major streaming platforms including iQIYI, Youku, and Sohu. As of 2025, the Chinese film industry is the second largest by global box office earnings (behind the United States), although 98% of earnings are domestic. China limits the number of foreign films that can be shown domestically. According to state sources, it has over 90,000 cinema screens as of 2025, more than any other country.

As of 2023, China has over 2,600 radio stations, all state-owned, and over 1,900 newspapers. Cities generally have a newspaper published by the local government and another by the local CCP branch. Journalism is tightly controlled and monitored by the CCP, with content critical of the government censored. Foreign Chinese-language news outlets are blocked, while English-language outlets are occasionally available but often censored. Prominent newspapers in China include the People's Daily, Global Times, China Daily, and Reference News. The most popular social media platform is WeChat. Other major platforms include the microblogging service Weibo, the social media platform Xiaohongshu, the news and content aggregator Toutiao, the video-sharing platform Xigua Video, and the short-form video platform Douyin, available internationally as TikTok.

=== Sport and games ===
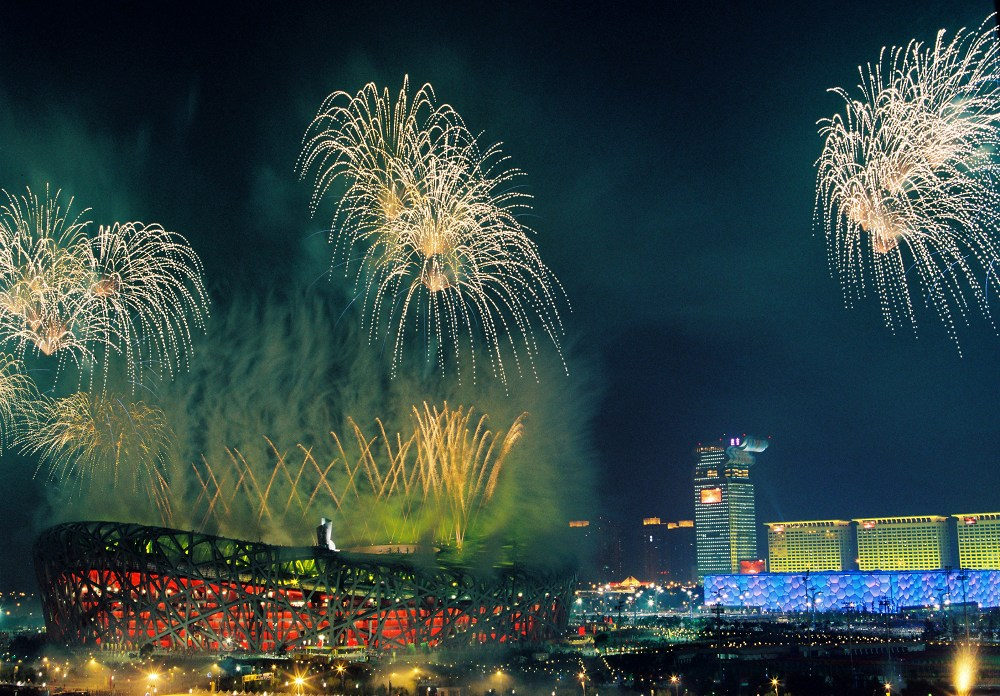
Fireworks over the Beijing National Stadium during the opening ceremony of the 2008 Summer Olympics

Traditional sports such as martial arts and dragon boat racing have been practiced in China for over a millennium. The ball game cuju predates the Qin dynasty and remained popular for millennia, declining during the late Qing dynasty. Chuiwan (similar to modern golf) and polo were popular sports among elites throughout portions of the imperial period, while commoners played regional ball games. Evolving out of Chinese martial arts in the Qing period, tai chi incorporates Taoist practices into a form of gymnastics.

Modern sporting was introduced to China from the West during the late 19th and early 20th centuries. China first participated in the Olympic Games in 1932. Although association football draws large audiences, the men's national team has only qualified once for the FIFA World Cup; the country hosted the FIFA Women's World Cup twice and the women's team finished as runners-up once.

China began to invest heavily in elite sports during the 1990s, and in 2008 Beijing hosted the Summer Olympics. Elite sports in China are managed by the General Administration of Sport, which oversees management centers for various sports, as well as provincial sports committees and teams. The vast majority of sports funding, especially for elite sports, comes from the government. China hosted the Winter Olympics in 2022, and the Asian Games in 1990, 2010, and 2022. (Note: The 2022 Asian Games were held in 2023.) China is dominant among international competition in table tennis (often dubbed China's national sport), badminton, diving, and weightlifting, and is among the top global competitors in snooker.

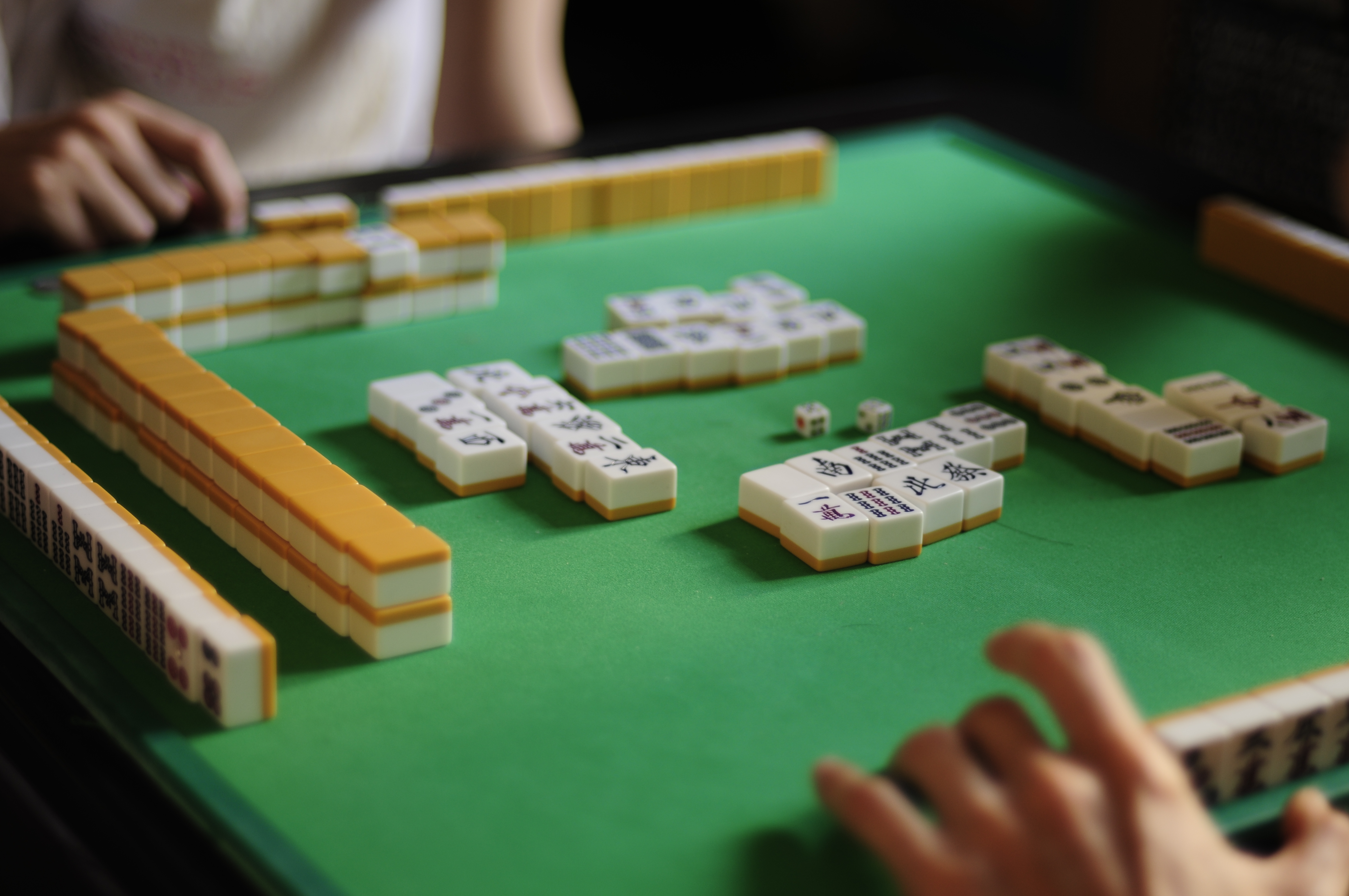
Mahjong originated as a gambling game during the Qing dynasty.

Various card, dice, and board games gained popularity in imperial China, most notably weiqi (also known as Go) and xiangqi (a relative of chess). Mahjong emerged during the 1800s, initially one of many popular gambling games. China is the world's largest video game market. Video games were introduced from Japan in the 1980s, and online video games grew to immense popularity alongside the spread of the internet.

== See also ==
- Outline of China
- Bibliographies of the People's Republic of China

== Sources ==
- The State of the World's Human Rights (Report). Amnesty International. 2026. Archived from the original on 20 June 2026.
- Death Sentences and Executions in 2024 (Report). Amnesty International. 2025. Archived from the original on 10 August 2026.
- Andrews, Julia F.; Shen, Kuiyi (2012). The Art of Modern China. University of California Press. ISBN 978-0-520-23814-5.
- Ba, Zaihua; Li, Yuqi; Ma, Jiao; Qin, Yining; Tian, Jinzhu; Meng, Yixiang; Yi, Jiarong; Zhang, Yingze; Chen, Fei (2023). "Reflections on the Dynamic Zero-COVID Policy in China". Preventive Medicine Reports. 36 102466: 1–10. doi:10.1016/j.pmedr.2023.102466. PMC 10728318. PMID 38116286.
- Bernot, Ausma (2025). "Queer Social Sorting: Control and Criminalization in China's LGBTQIA+ Activism". In Yu, Haiqing; Creemers, Rogier (eds.). Automating Governance in China? Data-Driven Systems in the Scoring Society. Leiden University Press. pp. 167–186. JSTOR jj.38479232.
- Bodde, Derk (1986). "The State and Empire of Ch'in". In Twitchett, Denis; Loewe, Michael (eds.). The Cambridge History of China: Volume 1, The Ch'in and Han Empires, 221 BC – AD 220. Cambridge University Press. pp. 20–102. doi:10.1017/CHOL9780521243278.003. ISBN 978-0-521-24327-8.
- Bradley, David (2007). "East and Southeast Asia". In Moseley, Christopher (ed.). Encyclopedia of the World's Endangered Languages. Routledge. pp. 349–424. ISBN 978-0-7007-1197-0.
- Brussee, Vincent (2023). Social Credit: The Warring States of China's Emerging Data Empire. Palgrave Macmillan. doi:10.1007/978-981-99-2189-8. ISBN 978-981-99-2188-1.
- Brandt, Loren; Rawski, Thomas G., eds. (2019). Policy, Regulation and Innovation in China's Electricity and Telecom Industries. Cambridge University Press. doi:10.1017/9781108645997. ISBN 9781108645997.
  - Wu, Irene S. "China's Electrical and Communication Regulations in Global Context". 52–95.
  - Xu, Yi-chong. "The Search for High Power in China: State Grid Corporation of China". 221–261.
- Chan, Steve (2020). Thucydides's Trap? Historical Interpretation, Logic of Inquiry, and the Future of Sino-American Relations. University of Michigan Press. ISBN 978-0-472-13170-9.
- Chang, Bi-yu (2015). Place, Identity, and National Imagination in Post-war Taiwan. Routledge. ISBN 978-1-3176-5812-2.
- Chang, K. C., ed. (1977). Food in Chinese Culture: Anthropological and Historical Perspectives. Yale University Press. ISBN 9780300019384.
  - Chang, K. C. "Introduction". 1–22.
  - Hsu, Vera Y. N.; Hsu, Francis L. K. "Modern China: North". 295–316.
  - Anderson, E. N., Jr.; Anderson, Marja L. "Modern China: South". 317–382.
- Chang, Shih-Ming Li; Frederiksen, Lynn (2016). Chinese Dance: In the Vast Land and Beyond. Wesleyan University Press. ISBN 978-0-8195-7630-9.
- Chen, Chia-Lin; Pan, Haixiao; Shen, Qing; Wang, James J., eds. (2020). Handbook on Transport and Urban Transformation in China. Edward Elgar Publishing. doi:10.4337/9781786439246. ISBN 9781786439239.
  - Chen, Chia-Lin; Pan, Haixiao; Shen, Qing; Wang, James J. "Introduction to the Handbook on Transport and Urban Transformation in China". 1–17.
  - Fu, Xin. "Highway Development in China". 36–59.
- Chen, Lilly Lee (2016). "Hanyu Pinyin". In Minette, James; Chan, Sin-Wai (eds.). The Routledge Encyclopedia of the Chinese Language. Routledge. pp. 484–504. doi:10.4324/9781315675541. ISBN 9781315675541.
- Chen, Ruoyu; Zhang, Lingxiang (2019). "Imbalance in China's Sex Ratio at Birth: A Review". Journal of Economic Surveys. 33 (3): 1050–1069. doi:10.1111/joes.12309.
- Chen, Yu-jie (2022). "'One China' Contention in China–Taiwan Relations: Law, Policy, and Identity". The China Quarterly. 252: 2025–1044. doi:10.1017/S0305741022001333.
- Chen, Zhi (2004). "From Exclusive Xia to Inclusive Zhu-Xia: The Conceptualisation of Chinese Identity in Early China". Journal of the Royal Asiatic Society. 14 (3): 185–205. doi:10.1017/S135618630400389X. JSTOR 25188470.
- Cheung, Fanny M.; Tang, Catherine S. K. (2017). "Women's Lives in Contemporary Chinese Societies". In Brown, Carrie M.; Gielen, Uwe P.; Gibbons, Judith L.; Kuriansky, Judy (eds.). Women's Evolving Lives: Global and Psychosocial Perspectives. Springer Nature. pp. 19–38. doi:10.1007/978-3-319-58008-1. ISBN 978-3-319-58007-4.
- Clunas, Craig (2009). Art in China (2nd ed.). Oxford University Press. ISBN 9780192842077.
- Chu, Marcus P. (2024). Greater China's Olympic Medal Haul: Beyond Sports Excellence. Routledge. doi:10.4324/9781003373643. ISBN 9781032447315.
- Deng, Yong (2022). China's Strategic Opportunity: Change and Revisionism in Chinese Foreign Policy. Cambridge University Press. doi:10.1017/9781009105095. ISBN 978-1-009-09869-4.
- China Biodiversity Outlook (PDF) (Report). Deutsche Gesellschaft für Internationale Zusammenarbeit (GIZ). 2022. Archived (PDF) from the original on 10 June 2026.
- Ding, Xiaoqin (2009). "The Socialist Market Economy: China and the World". Science & Society. 73 (2): 235–241. doi:10.1521/siso.2009.73.2.235. JSTOR 40404550.
- Ebrey, Patricia Buckley (2010). The Cambridge Illustrated History of China (2nd ed.). Cambridge University Press. ISBN 978-0-521-12433-1.
- Fan, Chen; Ip, Penn Tsz Ting (2023). "'When Showing Hanfu to Foreigners, I Feel Very Proud': The Imagined Community and Affective Economies of Hanfu (Chinese Traditional Couture) Among Chinese Migrant Youths in the United Kingdom". European Journal of Cultural Studies. 26 (6): 781–802. doi:10.1177/13675494221124633.
- Finley, Joanne Smith (2021). "Why Scholars and Activists Increasingly Fear a Uyghur Genocide in Xinjiang". Journal of Genocide Research. 23 (3): 348–370. doi:10.1080/14623528.2020.1848109.
- Harris, Luke J. (2020). "Snooker and Billiards". In Nauright, John; Zipp, Sarah (eds.). Routledge Handbook of Global Sport. Routledge. pp. 227–237. ISBN 978-1-138-88723-7.
- Fang, Hong; Liu, Li, eds. (2023). Routledge Handbook of Sport in China. Routledge. ISBN 978-1-032-06820-6.
  - Huang, Fuhua; Wang, Xiaoqi. "Sports Transformation in Qin and Han Dynasties and Three Kingdoms Period". 15–22.
  - Liu, Hui; Qu, Yingjie. "The Transformation of Traditional Sports in the Ming and Qing Dynasties". 49–56.
  - Zhang, Huijie. "The Rise of Modern Sports and Olympics". 57–58.
  - Yuan, Shuying. "China at the Asian Games: Progress and Prospects". 279–286.
  - Meng, Ting. "The Effects of Hosting the Olympic Games in China: From Host and Non-Host Cities Perspectives". 309–315.
- Eskicioglu, Yigit Cem; Tauscher, Soner (2025). "Imperialism Through Sports: China's Strategy for Global Hegemony". Sport in Society: 1–17. doi:10.1080/17430437.2025.2573284.
- Fang, Ning, ed. (2020). China's Political System. China Governance System Research Series. China Social Sciences Press, Springer Science+Business Media. doi:10.1007/978-981-15-8362-9. ISBN 978-981-15-8361-2.
  - Xiao, Wen. "China's Politics and the Communist Party of China". 1–24.
- Feuchtwang, Stephan, ed. (2020). Handbook of Religion in Contemporary China. Edward Elgar Publishing. doi:10.4337/9781786437969. ISBN 9781786437952.
  - Feuchtwang, Stephan. "Introduction to the Handbook on Religion in China". 1–15.
  - Madsen, Richard. "Religious Policy in China". 17–33.
  - Billioud, Sébastien. "The Contemporary Confucian Revival in Perspective". 75–95.
  - Zhu, Yujie. "Heritage and Religion in China". 96–108.
- Feng, Haoyuan; Sun, Fengyun; Liu, Yaoyi; Zeng, Peng; Deng, Lingzhi; Che, Yue (2021). "Mapping Multiple Water Pollutants Across China Using the Grey Water Footprint". Science of the Total Environment. 785 (785) 147255: 1–12. Bibcode:2021ScTEn.78547255F. doi:10.1016/j.scitotenv.2021.147255. PMID 33933768.
- Finnane, Antonia (2008). Changing Clothes in China: Fashion, History, Nation. Columbia University Press. ISBN 978-0-231-14350-9.
- Sun, Jia; Condé, Carl; Wang, Jiahao (2026). "China". In Foley, Thomas; Tresidder, Anna Foucek; Bozeman, Leslie (eds.). Health and Healthcare Systems: A Global View. Springer Publishing. pp. 414–421. ISBN 978-0-8261-7474-1.
- Houston, Stephen, ed. (2004). The First Writing: Script Invention as History and Process. Cambridge University Press. ISBN 978-0-521-83861-0.
- Fravel, M. Taylor (2008). Strong Borders, Secure Nation: Cooperation and Conflict in China's Territorial Disputes. Princeton University Press. ISBN 978-0-691-13608-0.
- Fu, Congbin; Jiang, Zhihong; Guan, Zhaoyang; He, Jianhai; Xu, Zhongfeng (2008). "Climate of China and East Asian Monsoon". Regional Climate Studies of China. Springer Nature. pp. 1–48. doi:10.1007/978-3-540-79242-0. ISBN 978-3-5407-9242-0.
- Gaddis, John Lewis (1972). The United States and the Origins of the Cold War, 1941–1947. Columbia University Press. pp. 24–25. ISBN 978-0-2311-2239-9.
- da Graça, John V. (2000). Heads of State and Government (2nd ed.). Palgrave Macmillan. doi:10.1007/978-1-349-65771-1. ISBN 978-0-333-78615-4.
- Hamdani, Manal; Belfencha, Ismail (2024). "Strategic Implications of the US–China Semiconductor Rivalry". Discover Global Society. 2 67: 1–14. doi:10.1007/s44282-024-00081-5.
- Han, Rongbin (2026). Make China Great Again: Online Alt-History Fiction and Popular Authoritarianism. Columbia University Press. ISBN 9780231220545.
- Han, Yuting; He, Yao; Lyu, Jun; Yu, Canqing; Bian, Mingze; Li, Liming (2020). "Aging in China: Perspectives on Public Health". Global Health Journal. 4: 11–17. doi:10.1016/j.glohj.2020.01.002.
- Harvey, Brian (2019). China in Space: The Great Leap Forward (2nd ed.). Springer Nature. Bibcode:2019cnsg.book.....H. doi:10.1007/978-3-030-19588-5. ISBN 978-3-030-19587-8.
- He, Zhiguo; Wei, Wei (2023). China's Financial System and Economy: A Review (PDF) (Report). Annual Reviews.
- Heilmann, Sebastian (2018). Red Swan: How Unorthodox Policy-Making Facilitated China's Rise. Chinese University of Hong Kong Press. ISBN 978-9-6299-6827-4.
- Heinz, Annelise (2021). Mahjong: A Chinese Game and the Making of Modern American Culture. Oxford University Press. ISBN 9780190081812.
- Holcombe, Charles (2017). A History of East Asia: From the Origins of Civilization to the Twenty-First Century (2nd ed.). Cambridge University Press. ISBN 9781107118737.
- Huang, Guangping; et al. (2021). "Wildlife Conservation and Management in China: Achievements, Challenges and Perspectives". National Science Review. 8 (7) nwab042. doi:10.1093/nsr/nwab042. PMC 8310758. PMID 34691694.
- Idema, Wilt; Haft, Lloyd (1997). A Guide to Chinese Literature. University of Michigan Press. ISBN 978-0-89264-123-9.
- Inboden, Rana Siu (2021). China and the International Human Rights Regime. Cambridge University Press. doi:10.1017/9781108888745. ISBN 9781108888745.
- Jin, Keyu (2023). The New China Playbook: Beyond Socialism and Capitalism. Viking Press. ISBN 978-1-9848-7828-1.
- Kristensen, Hans M.; Korda, Matt; Johns, Eliana; Knight, Mackenzie (4 March 2025). "Chinese Nuclear Weapons, 2025". Bulletin of the Atomic Scientists. 81 (2): 135–160. Bibcode:2025BuAtS..81b.135K. doi:10.1080/00963402.2025.2467011.
- Kuiper, Kathleen, ed. (2011). The Culture of China. Britannica Educational Publishing. ISBN 9781615301409.
- Jia, Xintong; Feng, Zhuolin (2025). "Education in China: An Introduction". In Feng, Zhuolin; Wang, Qi; Liu, Niancai (eds.). Education in China and the World. Springer Nature and Shanghai Jiao Tong University Press. pp. 1–55. doi:10.1007/978-981-97-7415-9. ISBN 978-981-97-7414-2.
- Joseph, William A., ed. (2024). Politics in China: An Introduction (4th ed.). Oxford University Press. doi:10.1093/oso/9780197683200.001.0001. ISBN 978-0-19-768321-7.
  - Joseph, William A. "Studying Chinese Politics". 3–40.
  - Gilley, Bruce. "Deng Xiaoping and the Reform Era". 118–138.
  - Chan, Alfred L. "The Rise and Rule of Xi Jinping (2012–Present)". 139–160.
  - Joseph, William A. "Ideology: The Evolution of Chinese Communism". 161–207.
  - Li, Cheng. "China's Communist Party-State: The Structure and Dynamics of Power". 208–245.
  - deLisle, Jacques. "China's Legal System". 246–293.
  - Zweig, David. "China's Political Economy". 294–336.
  - Barnett, Robert. "Tibet". 489–522.
  - Bovingdon, Gardner. "Xinjiang". 523–553.
  - Lo, Sonny Shiu-Hing. "Hong Kong". 554–577.
- Laikwan, Pang (2024). One and All: The Logic of Chinese Sovereignty. Stanford University Press. ISBN 978-1-5036-3881-5.
- Lau, Frederick (2008). Music in China: Experiencing Music, Expressing Culture. Oxford University Press. ISBN 978-0-19-530124-3.
- Li, Xi; Lu, Jiapeng; et al. (2017). "The Primary Health-Care System in China". The Lancet. 390 (10112): 2584–2594. doi:10.1016/S0140-6736(17)33109-4. PMID 29231837. Archived from the original on 15 May 2021.
- Liboriussen, Bjarke; Martin, Paul (2016). "Special Issue: Games and Gaming in China". Games and Culture. 11 (3): 227–232. doi:10.1177/1555412015615296.
- Liu, Jingye; Guo, Fengqi; Shi, Ying; Ding, Rijia; Chen, Zhen (2025). "Assessing the Security of Crude Oil Supply Chain: The Case of China". Energy Strategy Reviews. 59 101733: 1–12. Bibcode:2025EneSR..5901733L. doi:10.1016/j.esr.2025.101733.
- Liu, Junru (2004). Chinese Foods. Translated by Wang, William W. China Intercontinental Press. ISBN 9787508506135.
- Liu, Li; Chen, Xingcan (2012). The Archaeology of China: From the Late Paleolithic to the Early Bronze Age. Cambridge University Press. ISBN 9780521643108.
- Lo, Chi (2025). Clash of the Economic Titans: China and the United States. Palgrave Macmillan. doi:10.1007/978-981-95-2510-2. ISBN 978-981-95-2509-6.
- Miller, Terry E.; Church, Michael (2015). "Chinese Opera". In Church, Michael (ed.). Other Classical Musics. The Boydell Press. pp. 126–137. ISBN 978-1-84383-726-8.
- Morton, W. Scott; Lewis, Charlton M. (2005). China: Its History and Culture (4th ed.). McGraw Hill. ISBN 9780071465267.
- Novel Coronavirus Pneumonia Emergency Response Epidemiology Team (2020). "The Epidemiological Characteristics of an Outbreak of 2019 Novel Coronavirus Diseases (COVID-19) in China" 新型冠状病毒肺炎流行病学特征分析. China CDC Weekly 中华流行病学杂志 (in Chinese). 41 (2): 145–151. doi:10.3760/cma.j.issn.0254-6450.2020.02.003. PMID 32064853.
- Owen, Stephen (2011). "Introduction". The Cambridge History of Chinese Literature. Vol. 1, to 1375. Cambridge University Press. pp. xx–xxxii. ISBN 978-0-521-85558-7.
- Pearson, Margaret M.; Rithmire, Meg; Tsai, Kellee (2023). The State and Capitalism in China. Cambridge University Press. doi:10.1017/9781009356732. ISBN 978-1-009-35673-2.
- Pils, Eva (2017). Human Rights in China. Polity Press. ISBN 978-1-5095-0069-7.
- Poston, Dudley L, Jr.; Wong, Juyin Helen (2016). "The Chinese Diaspora: The Current Distribution of the Overseas Chinese Population". Chinese Journal of Sociology. 2 (3): 348–373. doi:10.1177/2057150X16655077.
- Puett, Michael (2016). "Early China in Eurasian History". In Szonyi, Michael (ed.). A Companion to Chinese History. Wiley-Blackwell. pp. 89–105. doi:10.1002/9781118624593. ISBN 978-1-118-62460-9.
- Qi, Wei; Deng, Yu (2024). "How To Define The City Size In China? A Review Over A Century From 1918 to 2020". Cities. 144 104649: 1–13. doi:10.1016/j.cities.2023.104649.
- Que, Jianyu; Lu, Lin; Shi, Le (2019). "Development and Challenges of Mental Health in China". General Psychiatry. 32 (1) e100053: 1–4. doi:10.1136/gpsych-2019-100053. PMC 6551437. PMID 31179426.
- de Rambures, Dominique (2015). The China Development Model. Palgrave Macmillan. pp. 9–22. doi:10.1057/9781137465498_2. ISBN 978-1-349-49955-7.
- Ren, Mu (2021). Beyond Rigidity: China's Non-Intervention Policy in the Post-Cold War Period. Springer Nature. doi:10.1007/978-981-33-4623-9. ISBN 978-981-33-4623-9.
- Roberts, Margaret E. (2018). Censored: Distraction and Diversion Inside China's Great Firewall. Princeton University Press. ISBN 978-0-691-17886-8.
- Ropp, Paul S. (2010). China in World History. Oxford University Press. ISBN 978-0-19-979876-6.
- Rowe, William T. (2009). China's Last Empire: The Great Qing. Harvard University Press. ISBN 978-0-674-03612-3.
- Sai, Yukari; Fischer, Johan (2016). "Muslim Food Consumption in China: Between Qingzhen and Halal". In Bergeaud-Blackler, Florence; Fischer, Johan; Lever, John (eds.). Halal Matters: Islam, Politics, and Markets in Global Perspectives. Routledge. pp. 161–174. ISBN 978-1-138-81275-8.
- Scoggins, Suzanne E. (2018). "Policing Modern China". China Law and Society Review. 3 (2): 79–117. doi:10.1163/25427466-00302001. SSRN 3358916.
- Shelach-Lavi, Gideon (2015). The Archaeology of Early China: From Prehistory to the Han Dynasty. Cambridge University Press. doi:10.1017/CBO9781139022682. ISBN 978-0-521-19689-5.
- Shirk, Susan L. (2023). Overreach: How China Derailed Its Peaceful Rise. Oxford University Press. doi:10.1093/oso/9780190068516.001.0001. ISBN 978-0-19-006851-6.
- SIPRI Fact Sheet: Trends in World Military Expenditure, 2026 (PDF) (Report). Stockholm International Peace Research Institute. 2026. Archived (PDF) from the original on 28 April 2026.
- Smith, Richard J. (2020). "Introduction". Reexamining the Sinosphere: Transmissions and Transformations in East Asia. Cambria Press. pp. xxi–xlix. ISBN 9781604979879.
- Southgate, Laura (2019). ASEAN Resistance to Soveriegnity Violation: Interests, Balancing and the Role of the Vanguard State. Bristol University Press. doi:10.2307/j.ctvg5bt4s. ISBN 978-1-5292-0221-2. JSTOR j.ctvg5bt4s.
- Spence, Jonathan D. (2013). The Search for Modern China. W. W. Norton & Company. ISBN 978-0-393-93451-9.
- Ringen, Stein (2016). The Perfect Dictatorship: China in the 21st Century. Hong Kong University Press. ISBN 978-988-8208-93-7.
- Steinhardt, Nancy Shatzman (2019). Chinese Architecture. Princeton University Press. ISBN 978-0-691-16998-9.
- Stockmann, Daniela; Luo, Ting (2026). Governing Digital China. Cambridge University Press. doi:10.1017/9781009360692. ISBN 978-1-009-36065-4.
- Sullivan, Michael (1984). The Arts of China (3rd ed.). University of California Press. ISBN 978-0-520-04918-5.
- Swain, Tony (2017). Confucianism in China: An Introduction. Bloomsbury Academic. ISBN 978-1-4742-4244-8.
- Tai, Zixue; Lu, Jue (2021). "Playing with Chinese Characteristics: The Landscape of Video Games in China". In Jin, Dal Yong (ed.). The Routledge Handbook of Digital Media and Globalization. Routledge. ISBN 978-0-367-41579-2.
- Tam, Wai Lun (2011). "Communal Worship and Festivals in Chinese Villages". In Palmer, David A.; Shive, Glen; Wickeri, Philip L. (eds.). Chinese Religious Life. Oxford University Press. pp. 30–49. ISBN 978-0-19-973139-8.
- Tollefson, Jeff (2018). "China Declared World's Largest Producer of Scientific Articles". Nature. 553 (7689): 390. Bibcode:2018Natur.553..390T. doi:10.1038/d41586-018-00927-4.
- Pearson, Margaret; Rithmire, Meg; Tsai, Kellee S. (2021). "Party-State Capitalism in China". Current History. 120 (827): 207–213. doi:10.1525/curh.2021.120.827.207.
- "The Moscow Declaration on General Security". Yearbook of the United Nations 1946–1947. United Nations. 1947. OCLC 243471225. Archived from the original on 18 May 2015.</ref><ref>"Declaration by United Nations". United Nations. Archived from the original on 25 May 2017.
- Veeck, Gregory; Pannell, Clifton W.; Huang, Youping; Bao, Shuming (2016). China's Geography: Globalization and the Dynamics of Political, Economic, and Social Change (3rd ed.). Rowman & Littlefield. ISBN 978-1-4422-5255-4.
- Vercammen, Dan (2009). "Modernity Contra Tradition? Taijiquan's Struggle For Survival: A Chinese Case Study". In Pinxten, Rik; Dikomitis, Lisa (eds.). When God Comes To Town? Religious Traditions in Urban Contexts. Berghahn Books. pp. 114–144. ISBN 978-1-84545-554-5.
- Verma, Raj (2024). "India–China Rivalry, Border Dispute, Border Standoffs, and Crises". India Review. 23 (5): 397–408. doi:10.1080/14736489.2024.2423996.
- Wade, Geoff (2009). "The Polity of Yelang and the Origin of the Name 'China'" (PDF). Sino-Platonic Papers (188). Archived (PDF) from the original on 17 November 2017.
- Wang, David Dei-Wei, ed. (2017). A New Literary History of Modern China. Belknap Press. ISBN 9780674978898.
- Wang, Jing'ai; Liang, Shunlin; Shi, Peijun (2022). The Geography of Contemporary China. Springer Nature. doi:10.1007/978-3-031-04158-7. ISBN 978-3-031-04157-0.
- Wang, Jingyi; Wang, Peng (2024). "Campaign-Style Law Enforcement in China: Causes and Consequences". Journal of Criminology. 58 (1): 86–108. doi:10.1177/26338076241252686.
- Wang, Li; Wang, Zhihao (2019). "The Development and Reform of Public Health in China from 1949 to 2019". Globalization and Health. 15 (1) 45: 1–21. doi:10.1186/s12992-019-0486-6. PMC 6604346. PMID 31266514.
- Wang, Shouren (2024). The Expansion of Foreign Language Education in China (PDF) (Report). World Humanities Report. Archived (PDF) from the original on 13 August 2026.
- Wang, Tao (2023). Making Sense of China's Economy. Routledge. doi:10.4324/9781003310938-1. ISBN 978-1-032-31704-5.
- Wang, Yuanyuan; Hu, Zhishan; Peng, Ke; Xin, Ying; Yang, Yuan; Drescher, Jack; Chen, Runsen (2019). "Discrimination Against LGBT Populations in China". The Lancet Public Health. 4 (9): e440–e441. doi:10.1016/S2468-2667(19)30153-7. PMID 31493836.
- Webber, Michael; Crow-Miller, Britt; Rogers, Sarah (2017). "The South–North Water Transfer Project: Remaking the Geography of China". Regional Studies. 51 (3): 370–382. Bibcode:2017RegSt..51..370W. doi:10.1080/00343404.2016.1265647.
- Wei, Chiao (2015). "Daoism in China". In Deeg, Max; Scheid, Bernhard (eds.). Religion in China: Major Concepts and Minority Positions. Austrian Academy of Sciences Press. pp. 13–28. doi:10.2307/j.ctt1vw0pdc. ISBN 978-3-7001-7782-1. JSTOR j.ctt1vw0pdc.
- Wilkinson, Endymion (2012). Chinese History: A New Manual. Harvard University Asia Center. ISBN 978-0-674-06715-8.
- Wirth, Christian (2025). The Transformation of the Chinese People's Liberation Army into a 'World-Class Military' (PDF) (Report). Stiftung Wissenschaft und Politik. Archived (PDF) from the original on 14 March 2026.
- Wuthnow, Joel (2022). "Who Commands the Gun? Mobilization and Use of China's Armed Police". The China Quarterly. 253 (253): 74–89. doi:10.1017/S0305741022001254.
- Xiao, Jia (2026). "Calculating the Hu Huanyong Line". Annals of the American Association of Geographers. 116 (1): 17–38. Bibcode:2026AAAG..116...17X. doi:10.1080/24694452.2025.2534549.
- Xu, Guobin; Chen, Yanhui; Xu, Lianhua, eds. (2018). Introduction to Chinese Culture: Cultural History, Arts, Festivals and Rituals. Palgrave Macmillan. doi:10.1007/978-981-10-8156-9. ISBN 978-981-10-8155-2.
- Yang, Ruoxiao; Wang, William Shi Yuan (2018). "Categorical Perception of Chinese Characters by Simplified and Traditional Chinese Readers". Reading and Writing. 3 (5): 1133–1154. doi:10.1007/s11145-018-9832-y.
- Yao, Xinzhong; Zhao, Yanxia (2010). Chinese Religion: A Contextual Approach. Continuum International Publishing. ISBN 978-1-8470-6475-2.
- Zang, Xiaowei (2016). "Introduction: Who Are Ethnic Minorities and How Well Do They Do in China?". Handbook on Ethnic Minorities in China. Edward Elgar Publishing. pp. 1–19. ISBN 9781784717353.
- Zarrow, Peter (2006). China in War and Revolution, 1895–1949. Routledge. ISBN 978-1-134-21976-6.
- Zeng, Yi; Hesketh, Therese (2016). "The Effects of China's Universal Two-Child Policy". The Lancet. 388 (10054): 1930–1938. Bibcode:2016Lanc..388.1930Z. doi:10.1016/S0140-6736(16)31405-2. PMC 5944611. PMID 27751400.
- Zhai, Yida (2023). "Public Opinion in a Rising Power: National and International Orientations among the Chinese Public". Journal of East Asian Studies. 23: 71–94. doi:10.1017/jea.2023.3.
- Zhang, Chenghui; Zhang, Bo; Hong, Qingyang (2026). "Crime Data in Mainland China: Legal Frameworks, Accessibility, and Research Challenges". Journal of Contemporary Criminal Justice. 42 (1): 132–152. doi:10.1177/10439862251387467.
- Zhang, Hui; Zhou, Zheng (2019). "How is Table Tennis in China Successful?". German Journal of Exercise and Sports Research. 49 (3): 244–250. doi:10.1007/s12662-019-00583-4.
- Zhang, Mo (2026). Contemporary Chinese Law and Legal System: Fundamentals, Civil Justice and Process. Cambridge University Press. doi:10.1017/9781009690478. ISBN 9781009690447.
- Zhang, Xiang (2022). "The Internet Media in China". In Adams, Paul C.; Warf, Barney (eds.). Routledge Handbook of Media Geographies. Routledge. pp. 60–73. doi:10.4324/9781003039068. ISBN 978-0-367-48285-5.
- Zhao, Suisheng (2023). The Dragon Roars Back: Transformational Leaders and Dynamics of Chinese Foreign Policy. Stanford University Press. doi:10.1515/9781503634152. ISBN 978-1-5036-3415-2.
- Zheng, Jinming; Chen, Shushu; Tan, Tien-Chin; Lau, Patrick Wing Chung (2018). "Sport Policy in China (Mainland)". International Journal of Sport Policy and Politics. 10 (3): 469–491. doi:10.1080/19406940.2017.1413585.
