= Laws regarding religious activities in China =

Article 36 of the 1982 Constitution of China states that Chinese citizens are free to believe in, or not to believe in, religion. It also provides that while "normal religious activities" are protected by the state, religious activities must not "disrupt public order, impair the health of citizens, or interfere with the educational system of the state" and that religious affairs must not be "subject to any foreign domination." Buddhism, Catholicism, Protestantism, Taoism, and Islam in China are organized into five official associations controlled by the United Front Work Department (UFWD) of the Central Committee of the Chinese Communist Party. Religious activities are regulated and overseen by the UFWD.

== Background ==
China traditionally negates religious freedom, tradition continued in the modern era and by the Communist regime. The fear is that popular religions foment rebellion.

The Chinese Communist Party (CCP) is officially atheist and requires its members to be atheists. At different points in the history of the People's Republic of China, the CCP has undertaken antireligious campaigns as well as campaigns to promote atheism.

Currently, five religions are officially recognized by the state and organized into national associations under the control of the State Administration for Religious Affairs, a state body that was merged into the United Front Work Department of the Central Committee of the CCP in 2018 during the general secretaryship of Xi Jinping. The five officially-recognized religions are Buddhism, Catholicism, Taoism, Islam, and Protestantism, organized into five associations:

- Buddhist Association of China
- Chinese Catholic Patriotic Association
- Chinese Taoist Association
- Islamic Association of China
- Three-Self Patriotic Movement (Protestant)

China requires the five religious associations to follow the CCP and the state's leadership. People can practice religion within the scope of these associations.

People who practice religions are not permitted to become members of the CCP.

According to Zhejiang University sociologist Yanfei Sun, the Chinese government has generally been more concerned with religions with a highly centralized authority structure than with more decentralized ones.

== 1981 Document No. 19 ==
In 1981, the Central Committee of the CCP issued Document No. 19, which describes the party-state's approach to religion. Formally titled The Basic Viewpoint and Policy on the Religious Question during Our Country's Socialist Period, Document No. 19 revised the CCP's stance on religion and identified some specific policies and regulations.

Document No. 19 states that religion is a characteristic of a period of development in human society, that religion will exist for a long time, and that it will eventually disappear as human society develops. It describes the development of religion as a way for primitive society to explain the "sense of awe toward natural phenomena" and contends that as human society developed, the dominant classes used religion as an opiate to control the masses.

Document No. 19 states that attempts to eliminate religion through coercion are counterproductive. The publication describes the CCP's history of religious policy, contending that there were "major errors" in religious policy after the founding of the People's Republic of China and that previous "coercive measures" against religion backfired. Document No. 19 especially criticizes what it describes as leftist errors after 1957, exacerbated by the Gang of Four's measures against religious adherents during the Cultural Revolution, and which forced some religious currents underground. Document No. 19 deems the efforts during the Cultural Revolution to suppress religion entirely were "completely wrong and extremely harmful."

Document No. 19 states that Marxists should be atheists and free to propagate atheism, but that they must do so without antagonizing religious believers. It permits CCP members to take part in religious activities, especially in ethnic minority regions, where their absence would do more harm than good. If cadres become religious believers themselves, however, Document No. 19 states that they ought to be expelled from the party.

The publication asserts that at the current stage of socialism, conflicts between atheists and theists are of lesser importance. According to Document No. 19, religious adherents and atheists can both find common ground in building socialism. It asserts that after the full development of socialism, religion "will eventually disappear from human history."

It also states that criminal or counter-revolutionary activities practiced under the guise of religion will not be tolerated. Document No. 19 provides that criminal elements "hiding behind the facade of religion will be severely punished according to law."

Document No. 19 addresses clergy formation briefly, noting that the government should establish seminarians to train religious personnel who "in terms of politics, fervently love their homeland and support the Party's leadership and the Socialist system and who possess sufficient knowledge."

Academic S.A. Smith writes that Document No. 19 resulted in the PRC returning to its 1950s concept of free exercise of religion within state regulatory bounds. According to Smith, Document No. 19 contributed to the religious revival in China during the reform era.

== 1982 Constitution ==
According to the current 1982 state constitution, the People's Republic of China is led by the Chinese Communist Party (CCP). Article 36 of the Chinese Constitution explicitly deals with religious affairs. It states:

Citizens of the People's Republic of China enjoy freedom of religious belief. No state organ, public organization or individual may compel citizens to believe in, or not to believe in, any religion; nor may they discriminate against citizens who believe in, or do not believe in, any religion. The state protects normal religious activities. No one may make use of religion to engage in activities that disrupt public order, impair the health of citizens or interfere with the educational system of the state. Religious bodies and religious affairs are not subject to any foreign domination.

The 1978 Constitution had a shorter provision on religion, stating, "[C]itizens enjoy freedom to believe in religion and freedom not to believe in religion and to propagate atheism."

Banning discrimination against religious citizens in China is usually not interpreted to mean that positions in the government or military are equally open to believers in religions. CCP membership is often a prerequisite for many government or military positions. The CCP prohibits its members from holding religious beliefs and mandates the expulsion of violators.

"Normal religious activities" is interpreted by the authorities to mean religious activities carried out by religious bodies that have official government approval. Religions that are not permitted to exist in China, like the Falun Gong or Jehovah's Witnesses, are not protected by the constitution. Religious groups that are not registered by the government, like Catholics who are part of an underground church or Protestant house churches, are not protected by the constitution. Furthermore, religious activities by approved groups that do not conform to the many regulations governing religion in China are also not protected by the constitution.

== 1991 Document No. 6 ==
In February 1991, the CCP Central Committee and the State Council of China issued Document No. 6, formally titled On Some Problems Concerning Further Improving Work on Religion. Document No. 6 stated that Document No. 19 (1981) continued to be the guideline on religious work and positively assessed work to date.

Document No. 6 stated that religious affairs must be supervised by the law and drew a distinction between "normal religious practices" and the use of "religion to engage in disruptive activities". According to Document No. 6, "hostile foreign forces" had used religion to harm China and contended that the same pattern had contributed to the disintegration of the Soviet Union. Thus, Document No. 6 concluded that "religious bodies and religious affairs must adhere to the principles of the independent and autonomous administration of their religion and not be subject to any foreign domination."

== Measures regarding organisations deemed as "cultic groups." ==
On 30 October 1999, the National People's Congress passed the Resolution on Banning Cults, Preventing and Punishing Cultic Activities. The Supreme People's Court and the Supreme People's Procuratorate promulgated instructions on how to apply existing criminal law to people involved in "evil cults," which it defined as "illegal groups that are founded by using religion, qigong, or other pretenses; deify their leaders; produce and spread superstitious ideas and heretical teachings to deceive and swindle people' recruit and control their members; and pose a danger to society." With some revisions, these continue to be the basic legal framework for new religious movements, which the state deems as cults, as of 2026.

== 2006 Procedures for the Registration of Religious Ministers ==
These rules from 2006 simply detail the procedures used in order to register religious ministers in China. Religious ministers who do not conform to these procedures are not permitted to serve in Chinese religious bodies.

== 2007 Measures on the Management of the Reincarnation of Living Buddhas in Tibetan Buddhism ==
In July 2007, the State Administration for Religious Affairs issued management measures for the reincarnation of living Buddhas in Tibetan Buddhism (Order No.5) to be effective in September 2007.

Under the regulation, a reincarnate lama may not be recognized without the CCP's approval and must be born within China's borders. Reincarnate lamas must "protect the unification of the state," among other conditions. The regulation comprises 14 articles, including principles, conditions, the application process, approval procedures, and punishments for those violating the regulation. The regulation is seen as a means to limit the power of the Dalai Lama, who has lived in India since 1959. Some argue that when he passes away, there could be two new Dalai Lamas: one approved by the CCP and the other identified by Buddhist monks.

== 2021 Measures for the Administration of Religious Personnel ==
In February 2021, China's State Administration for Religious Affairs issued "Measures for the Administration of Religious Personnel" (Order No. 15) to be effective on May 1, 2021. Taiwan criticized the law, slamming the CCP for regulating freedom of religion. Among the restrictions, Article III requires religious clergy to "love the motherland" and "support the leadership of the Chinese Communist Party." Religious clergy must also "adhere to the direction of the Sinicization of religion in China." Under Article XII, religious clergy cannot accept overseas appointments or engage in religious activities that would endanger China's national security. Article XVI requires that Catholic bishops be approved and ordained by the Bishops' Conference of the Catholic Church in China.

== 2022 Measures governing Internet religious services ==
In December 2021, China's State Administration for Religious Affairs issued "Measures for the Administration of Internet Religious Information Services," the first CCP regulation dedicated to Internet control over religious activities, effective March 1, 2022. The new law restricted religious content online to approved sites and services. Among the restrictions, any religious content may be posted only with a CCP-issued permit by those based in and recognized by Chinese law. Content perceived to incite subversion, jeopardize national security, challenge the CCP or socialism, undermine social stability, or promote extremism of any form will be banned. The regulation also prohibits working with foreign organizations.

== 2023 Measures for religious activity venues ==
In July 2023, China's State Administration for Religious Affairs issued "Administrative Measures for Religious Activity Venues" (Order No. 19) to be effective on September 1, 2023. Order 19 repealed the previous 2005 Measures. Religious activity venues must not be used for activities that "endanger national security, disrupt social order [or] damage national interests." Managers of religious venues will be reviewed and evaluated for official approval by state officials and must "love the motherland and support the leadership of the Communist Party of China and the socialist system."

== 2024 Xinjiang Regulations on Religious Affairs ==
In December 2023, the CCP-controlled Xinjiang People's Congress issued the revised "Regulations on Religious Affairs of the Xinjiang Uyghur Autonomous Region" to be effective on February 1, 2024. The 78-article regulations cover religious organizations, venues, schools, clergy, activities, and properties. Under Article 5, religions must "practice core socialist values" and "adhere to the direction of the Sinicization of religions." Under Article 6, religions cannot be subject to "interference or control by foreign forces." The regulations also impose new requirements for religious institutions applying to create places of worship. New or renovated religious sites, including mosques, require the approval of the local government and must "embody Chinese characteristics and style" in terms of architecture, sculptures, paintings, and decorations.

The regulations align with the CCP's national laws and regulations to "sinicize" religions, a priority under CCP general secretary Xi Jinping since 2016.

== See also ==
- Heterodox teachings (Chinese law)
- Human rights in Tibet
- Persecution of Falun Gong
- Religion in China
- Antireligious campaigns in China
