= Freedom of religion in China =

In the People's Republic of China (PRC), freedom of religion is formally provided for in the 1982 state constitution, yet with a caveat: the government controls what it calls "normal religious activity", defined in practice as activities that take place within government-sanctioned religious organizations and registered places of worship. Although the PRC's communist government claimed responsibility for the practice of religion, human rights bodies such as United States Commission on International Religious Freedom (USCIRF) have much criticized this differentiation as falling short of international standards for the protection of religious freedom.

The ruling Chinese Communist Party (CCP) officially espouses state atheism, and has conducted antireligious campaigns to this end. China's five officially sanctioned religious organizations are the Buddhist Association of China, Chinese Taoist Association, Islamic Association of China, Three-Self Patriotic Movement and Catholic Patriotic Association. These groups have been overseen and controlled by the CCP's United Front Work Department since the State Administration for Religious Affairs' absorption into the United Front Work Department in 2018. Unregistered religious groups - including house churches, Falun Gong, and underground Catholics - face varying degrees of harassment, including imprisonment and torture. China has recently updated its Religious Affairs Regulations, leading to a notable curtailment of the freedom of religion and belief.

== Legal framework ==
China traditionally negates religious freedom, tradition continued in the modern era and by the Communist regime. The fear is that popular religions foment rebellion.

=== Republic of China ===
Under the early Republic of China view of freedom of religion, freedom attached to religious practice deemed proper (primarily based on the extent to which it resembled the Christian normative religious model). This definition view free religion focused on the "religion" versus "superstition" dichotomy, with state-sanctioned practices in the former category and the latter including Chinese folk religion. The 1912 provisional constitution's freedom of religious belief provision was framed on the Protestant model of religion as an organized faith and it did not protect folk religious belief or temples from being destroyed or repurposed. As academic Mayfair Mei-hui Yang writes, ROC "elites saw no contradiction between protecting freedom of belief on the one hand and eradicating superstition and destroying temples on the other."

The highest court in the ROC first ruled on the parameters of the ROC's freedom of religion principle in 1939. Religion issues had rarely been ruled on by ROC courts until that time, instead being determined by bureaucrats and Nationalist cadres.

The Nationalist government of the ROC intensified the suppression of local religion. Temples were widely appropriated, destroyed, or used for schools. From 1927 to 1937, the ROC condemned folk religious practices as superstition and sought to eliminate these practices through anti-superstition campaigns. The 1928 "Standards for retaining or abolishing gods and shrines" formally abolished all cults of gods with the exception of human heroes such as Yu the Great, Guan Yu and Confucius.

According to Article 13 of the Constitution of the Republic of China of 1947:

The people shall have freedom of religious belief.

=== People's Republic of China ===
Shortly after the October 1949 proclamation of the People's Republic of China, the CCP cabined its freedom of religion principles to the religions it viewed as potentially conforming to modern religion: Buddhism, Daoism, Islam, Protestantism, and Catholicism. These religions continued to be regulated, including through national associations.

In 1981, the Central Committee of the CPC issued Document No. 19, which describes the party-state's approach to religion. Formally titled The Basic Viewpoint and Policy on the Religious Question during Our Country's Socialist Period, Document No. 19 revised the CPC's stance on religion and identified some specific policies and regulations. According to Document No. 19, religious adherents and atheists can both find common ground in building socialism. Academic S.A. Smith writes that Document No. 19 resulted in the PRC returning to its 1950s concept of free exercise of religion within state regulatory bounds. According to Smith, Document No. 19 contributed to the religious revival in China during the reform era.

Article 36 of the Constitution of China of 1982 specifies that:

Citizens of the People's Republic of China enjoy freedom of religious belief. No state organ, public organization or individual may compel citizens to believe in, or not to believe in, any religion; nor may they discriminate against citizens who believe in, or do not believe in, any religion. The state protects normal religious activities. No one may make use of religion to engage in activities that disrupt public order, impair the health of citizens or interfere with the educational system of the state. Religious bodies and religious affairs are not subject to any foreign domination.

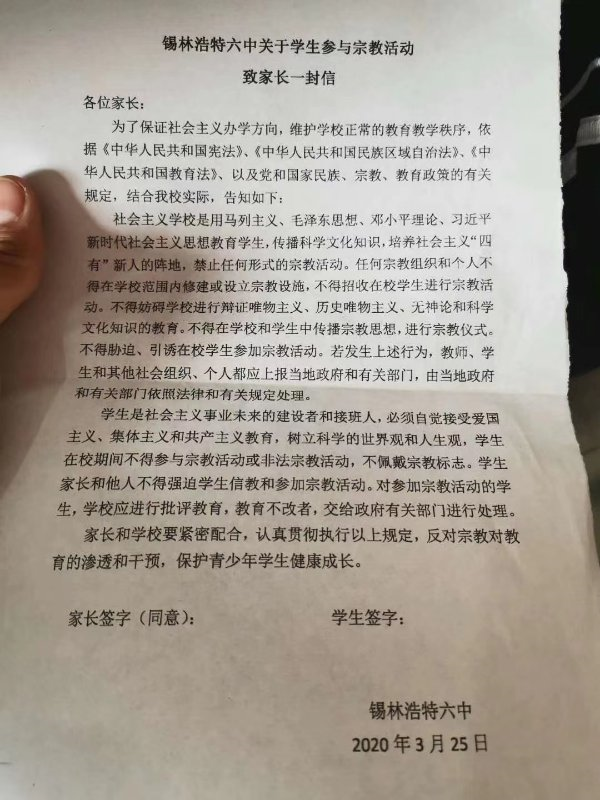
School letter in Xilinhot warning parents about bringing children to religious activities

This protection is extended only to what are called "normal religious activities", generally understood to refer to religions that submit to state control via the State Administration for Religious Affairs. The Constitution further forbids the use of religion to "engage in activities that disrupt social order, impair the health of citizens or interfere with the educational system of the state." Furthermore, it states that "[r]eligious organizations and religious affairs are not subject to any foreign dominance."

The law affords protection to five officially sanctioned religions: the Buddhist Association of China, Chinese Taoist Association, Islamic Association of China, Three-Self Patriotic Movement and Catholic Patriotic Association. Religious groups are required to register with the State Administration for Religious Affairs (SARA, formerly known as the central Religious Affairs Bureau) or its provincial and local offices (still known as Religious Affairs Bureaus (RABs)). SARA and the RABs are responsible for monitoring and judging the legitimacy of religious activity.

The law does not define "proselytization"; however, the constitution states that nobody can force a citizen to believe or not believe in a religion. Proselytizing is only permitted in private settings or within registered houses of worship. Proselytization in public, in unregistered churches or temples, or by foreigners is prohibited. Members of the officially atheist Communist Party are strongly discouraged from holding religious faith. New laws in 2022 required anyone preaching online to apply for a permit for proselytizing. In 2025, the National Religious Affairs Administration issued a new online activity guidelines for clergy.

A significant number of non-sanctioned churches and temples exist, attended by locals and foreigners alike. Unregistered or underground churches are not officially banned, they are dependent on local authorities for permission to practice, and in many areas are not permitted to conduct religious activities. These bodies may face varying degrees of interference, harassment, and persecution by state and party organs. The most common charge in 2022 was "organizing or using a cult to undermine implementation of law," - other charges included endangering state security and inciting secession.

Religious believers have also been charged under article 300 of the criminal code, which forbids using heretical organizations to "undermine the implementation of the law". An extrajudicial, Communist Party-led security organ called the 6-10 Office oversees the suppression of Falun Gong and, increasingly, other unregistered religious organizations.

Folk religions, though not officially protected, are sometimes tolerated by authorities. The State Administration for Religious Affairs has created a department to oversee the management of folk religion.

Although the Chinese Communist Party has a long history of restricting religious freedom, in recent years it has become increasingly hostile toward religion and has initiated campaigns to "sinicize" Islam, Tibetan Buddhism, and Christianity to rid them of what it deems "foreign" influences. The 2018 Revised Regulations on Religious Affairs effectively ban "unauthorized" religious teaching and expand the role of local authorities in controlling religious activities. In 2019, religious freedom conditions in China continued to deteriorate. The Chinese government has created a high-tech surveillance state, utilizing facial recognition and artificial intelligence to monitor religious minorities. On 1 April 2019, a new regulation requiring religious venues to have legal representatives and professional accountants went into effect. Some smaller religious venues, especially in rural areas, found these requirements impossible to fulfill.

Since January 2024, 415 Taiwanese people who had travelled to China had gone missing, been detained or sent to prison. The Mainland Affairs Council said 23 of the cases were involved in religious activities, including 20 followers of I-Kuan Tao, which China calls as an illegal religious group.

== Christianity ==
Christianity has had a presence in China dating as far back as the Tang dynasty, and accumulated a following in China with the arrival of large numbers of missionaries during the Qing dynasty. Missionaries were expelled from China in 1949 when the Communist Party came to power, and the religion was associated with Western imperialism. However, Christianity experienced a resurgence of popularity since the reforms under Deng Xiaoping in the late 1970s and 1980s. By 2011, approximately 60 million Chinese citizens were estimated to be practicing Protestantism or Catholicism. The majority of these do not belong to the state-sanctioned churches. The government declared in 2018 that there are over 44 million Christians in China.

Religious practices are still often tightly controlled by government authorities. Chinese children in mainland China are permitted to be involved with officially sanctioned Christian meetings through the Three-Self Patriotic Movement or the Catholic Patriotic Association. In early January 2018, Chinese authorities in Shanxi province demolished a church, which created a wave of fear among the Christians.

From 2020 to 2021, estimates of the number of Christians in China ranged from 5.1 to 7.4% of the population.

In reports of countries with the strongest anti-Christian persecution, China was ranked by the Open Doors organization in 2019 as the 27th most severe country and in 2023 as 16th most severe.

In 2025, the Chinese government banned Mormon congregations throughout the country. In October 2025, the Chinese government arrested dozens of Zion Church members in Beijing, Shanghai, Shenzhen, and other cities.

=== Roman Catholicism ===
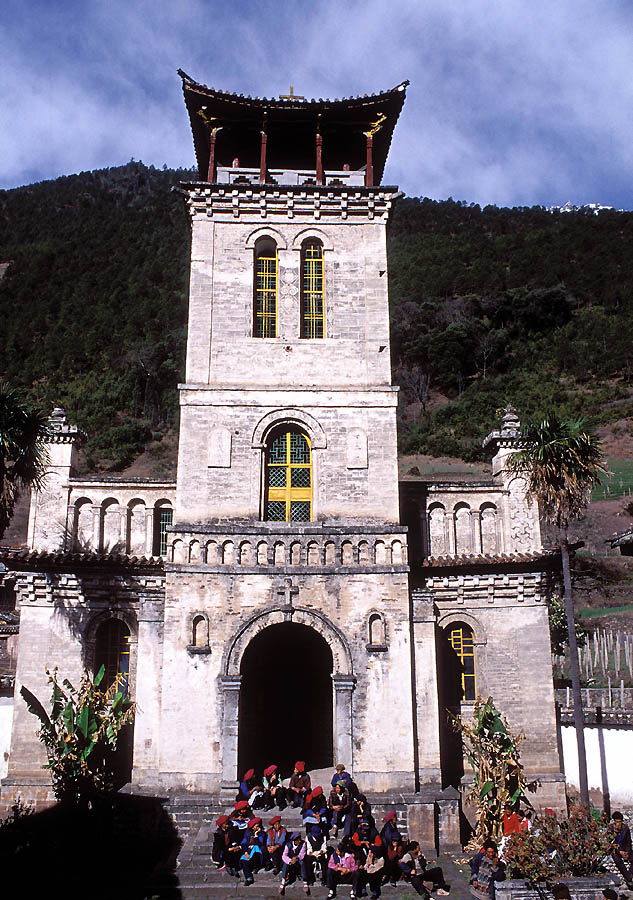
A Roman Catholic church by the Lancang (Mekong) River at Cizhong, Yunnan Province, China

China is home to an estimated 12 million Catholics, the majority of whom worship outside the official Catholic Patriotic Association (CPA). However, in 2020, there was no accurate number of Catholics in the country as the Vatican was unable to collect information. Estimates in 2020 suggested that Catholics made up 0.69% of the population.

Estimates in 2010 suggested that there were roughly 40 bishops unordained by the CPA who operated unofficially, and recognized the authority of the Vatican.

The state-sanctioned church appoints its own bishops, and as with all official religions, exercises control over the doctrine and leadership of the religion. As a matter of maintaining autonomy and rejecting foreign intervention, the official church has no official contact with the Vatican, and does not recognize its authority. However, the CPA has allowed for unofficial Vatican approval of ordinations. Although the CPA continues to carry out ordinations opposed by the Holy See, the majority of CPA bishops are now recognized by both authorities. In addition to overseeing the practice of the Catholic faith, the CPA espouses politically oriented objectives as well. Liu Bainian, chairman of the CPA and the Bishops Conference of the Catholic Church in China, stated in a 2011 interview that the church needed individuals who "love the country and love religion: politically, they should respect the Constitution, respect the law, and fervently love the socialist motherland."

Some Catholics who recognize the authority of the Holy See choose to worship clandestinely due to the risk of harassment from authorities. Several underground Catholic bishops have been reported disappeared or imprisoned, and harassment of unregistered bishops and priests is common. There are reports of Catholic bishops and priests being forced by authorities to attend the ordination ceremonies for bishops who had not gained Vatican approval. Chinese authorities also have reportedly pressured Catholics to break communion with the Vatican by requiring them to renounce an essential belief in Roman Catholicism, the primacy of the Roman Pontiff. In the past, however, authorities have permitted some Vatican-loyal churches to carry out operations.

In December 2025, China's Catholic authorities implemented regulations requiring state approval for all clergy travel outside the mainland. This measure is part of broader controls under Xi Jinping's "Sinicization" campaign since April 2016, including ideological training, surveillance, and pressure on underground Catholic communities, restricting independent religious practice.

=== Protestantism ===
The Three-Self Patriotic Movement (TSPM), National Committee of the Three-Self Patriotic Movement of the Protestant Churches in China, or colloquially the Three-Self Church, is the government-sanctioned ("patriotic") Christian organization in China. Known in combination with the China Christian Council as the lianghui, they form the only state-sanctioned ("registered") Protestant church in mainland China. All other Protestant denominations are illegal.

Chinese house churches are a religious movement of unregistered assemblies of Christians in China, which operate independently of the government-run Three-Self Patriotic Movement (TSPM) and China Christian Council (CCC) for Protestant groups and the Catholic Patriotic Association (CPA) and the Chinese Catholic Bishops Council (CCBC) for Catholics. They are also known as the "Underground" Church or the "Unofficial" Church, although this is somewhat of a misnomer as they are collections of unrelated individual churches rather than a single unified church. They are called "house churches" because as they are not officially registered organizations, they cannot independently own property and hence they meet in private houses, often in secret for fear of arrest or imprisonment.

By 2015, Three-Self Patriotic Movement claimed to have 10-15 million worshippers, while the total number of Protestants, including unofficial house churches, was calculated to be 30 million members.

=== Others outside the mainland ===
Several foreign missionary religious groups are also present outside mainland China. The Church of Scientology, The Church of Jesus Christ of Latter-day Saints (Mormons) and the Unification Church are registered. Other Christian denominations present include Presbyterians, the True Jesus Church, Baptists, Lutherans, Seventh-day Adventists, and Episcopalians.

Approximately 70 percent of the 475,000 Aborigines of Taiwan are Christian. Jehovah's Witnesses are outlawed in mainland China (except in the territories of Hong Kong and Macau with up to 5,975 members in the two territories and 11,284 members in the Taiwan Area).

== Buddhism ==
=== Tibetan Buddhism ===
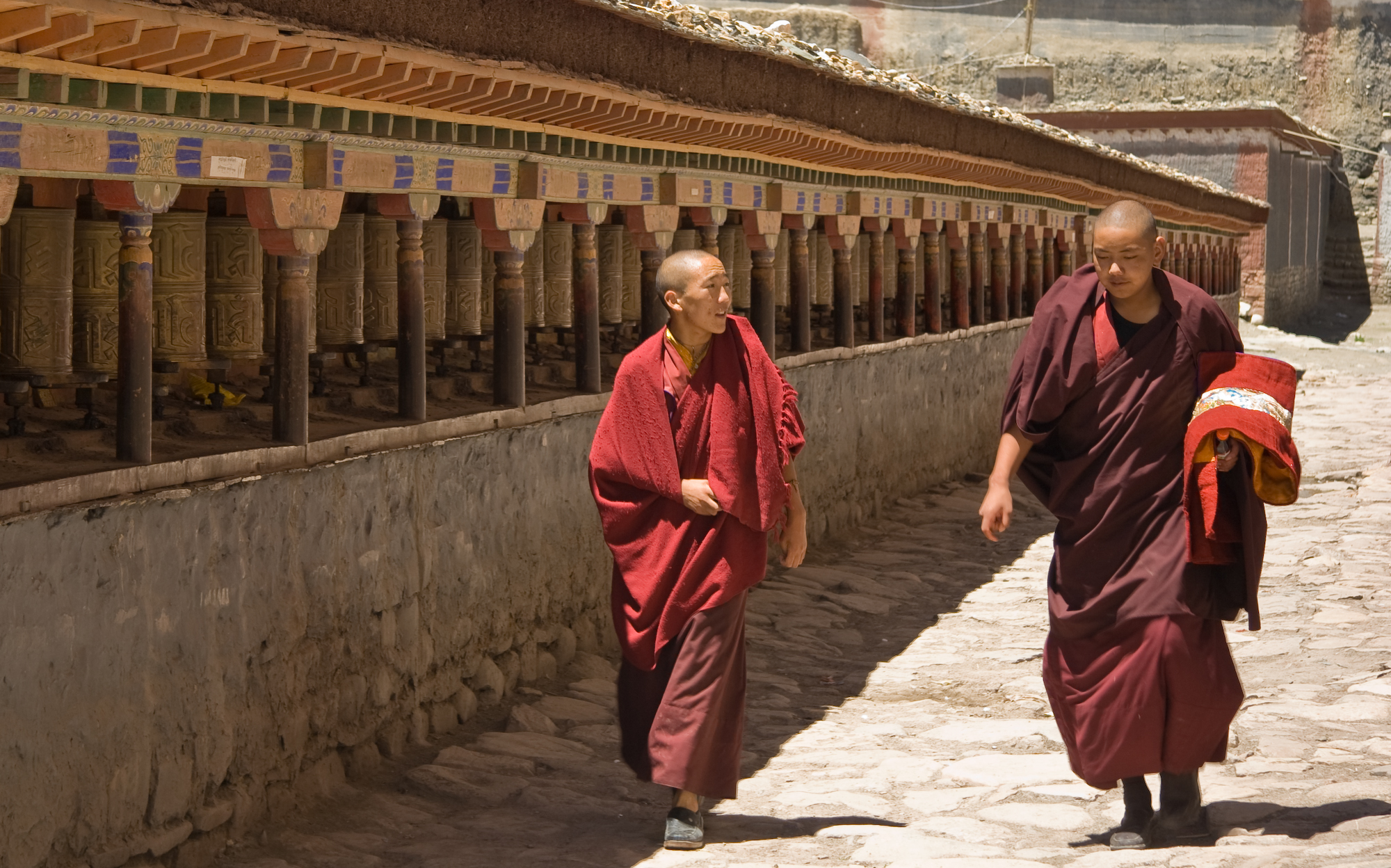
Two young Tibetan Buddhists at the Sakya Monastery in southern Tibet

China took full control of Tibet in 1959. In the wake of the takeover and especially during the cultural revolution many monasteries were destroyed and many monks and laypeople killed. The 14th Dalai Lama fled to India and has since ceded temporal power to an elected government-in-exile. The current Dalai Lama has attempted to negotiate with the Chinese authorities for greater autonomy and religious freedom for Tibet. As various high-ranking Lamas in the country have died, the authorities have proposed their own candidates on the religious authorities, which has led at times to rival claimants to the same position. In an effort to control this, the Chinese government passed a law in 2007 requiring a Reincarnation Application be completed and approved for all lamas wishing to reincarnate.

The present incarnation of the Panchen Lama is disputed. The Dalai Lama recognizes Gedhun Choekyi Nyima; however, the Chinese government recognizes Gyaincain Norbu as the incarnation of the 11th Panchen Lama. Exile Tibetan sources allege that Gedhun Choekyi Nyima was kidnapped by the Chinese government. The identity of the Panchen Lama is of critical importance to Tibetan Buddhism because he is one of the authorities that must approve the next Dalai Lama.

Monks are required to obtain certificates from the authorities that permit them to reside in monasteries.

== Judaism ==
There are also a small number of adherents of Judaism in Taiwan, mainly expatriates. In mainland China, since 2015, descendants of the Kaifeng Jews in Henan have come under government pressure and suspicion.

== Taoism ==
Taoist practitioners are required to register with the PRC-controlled Chinese Taoist Association (CTA), which exercises control over religious doctrine and personnel. Local governments restrict the construction of Taoist temples and statues, and call for abandonment of practices they deem to be "superstitious" or "feudal". The CTA dictates the proper interpretation of Taoist doctrine, and exhorts Taoist practitioners to support the Communist Party and the state. For example, a Taoist scripture reading class held by the CTA in November 2010 required participants to "fervently love the socialist motherland [and] uphold the leadership of the Chinese Communist Party."

Researchers and academics estimate that as much as 80 percent of Taiwan's population believes in some form of traditional folk religion. These beliefs may include some aspects of shamanism, ancestor worship, belief in ghosts and other spirits, and animism. Such folk religions may overlap with an individual's belief in Buddhism, Taoism, Confucianism, or other traditional Chinese religions. Traditional Chinese religions with adherents constituting less than 5 percent of the population include: I Kuan Tao, Tien Ti Chiao (Heaven Emperor Religion), Tien Te Chiao (Heaven Virtue Religion), Li-ism, Hsuan Yuan Chiao (Yellow Emperor Religion), Tian Li Chiao (Tenrikyo), Universe Maitreya Emperor Religion, Hai Tze Tao, Zhonghua Sheng Chiao (Chinese Holy Religion), Da Yi Chiao (Great Changes Religion), Pre-cosmic Salvationism, and Huang Chung Chiao (Yellow Middle Religion).

== Islam ==
After the communist takeover of the mainland in 1949, more than 20,000 Muslims fled to the island of Taiwan.

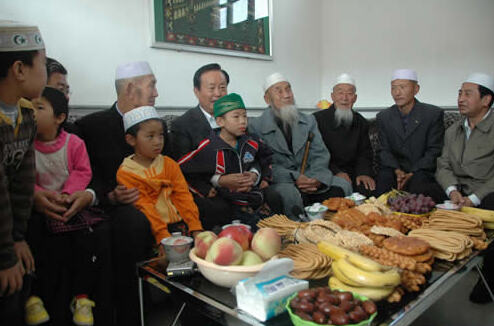
An ethnic Hui family celebrates Eid

In 2022, estimates suggest that 1.7% of the country's population is Muslim. According to a 2000 census, 96 percent of 20.3 million reported Muslims belong to three ethnic groups: Hui, Uyghur, and Kazakh. Most Hui Muslims live in Ningxia, Qinghai, and Gansu provinces, while Uyghur Muslims are predominantly found in Xinjiang.

The state-run Islamic Association of China (IAC) oversees the practice of Islam, though many Muslims worship outside the state system. The IAC regulates the content of sermons and the interpretation of religious scripture, exercises control over the confirmation of religious leaders, and monitors overseas pilgrimages. In 2001, the IAC established a committee to ensure that scriptures were interpreted in a manner that would serve the interests of the Chinese government and the Communist Party.

Authorities in Xinjiang impose rigid controls over religious expression, particularly over Uyghurs. Human rights reports indicate that crackdowns on religion are frequently integrated into security campaigns. Authorities monitor mosques, restrict the observation of Ramadan by government officials and students, and enact campaigns to prevent Uyghur men from wearing beards. In the past Uyghur Muslims who worship independently have been detained and charged with conducting "illegal religious activities".

However, the suppression of the Uyghurs has more to do with the fact that they are separatists, rather than Muslims. China banned a book titled "Xing Fengsu" ("Sexual Customs") which insulted Islam and placed its authors under arrest in 1989 after protests in Lanzhou and Beijing by Chinese Hui Muslims, during which the Chinese police provided protection to the Hui Muslim protesters, and the Chinese government organized public burnings of the book. The Chinese government assisted them and gave into their demands because the Hui do not have a separatist movement, unlike the Uyghurs. Hui Muslim protesters who violently rioted by vandalizing property during the protests against the book were let off by the Chinese government and went unpunished while Uyghur protesters were imprisoned.

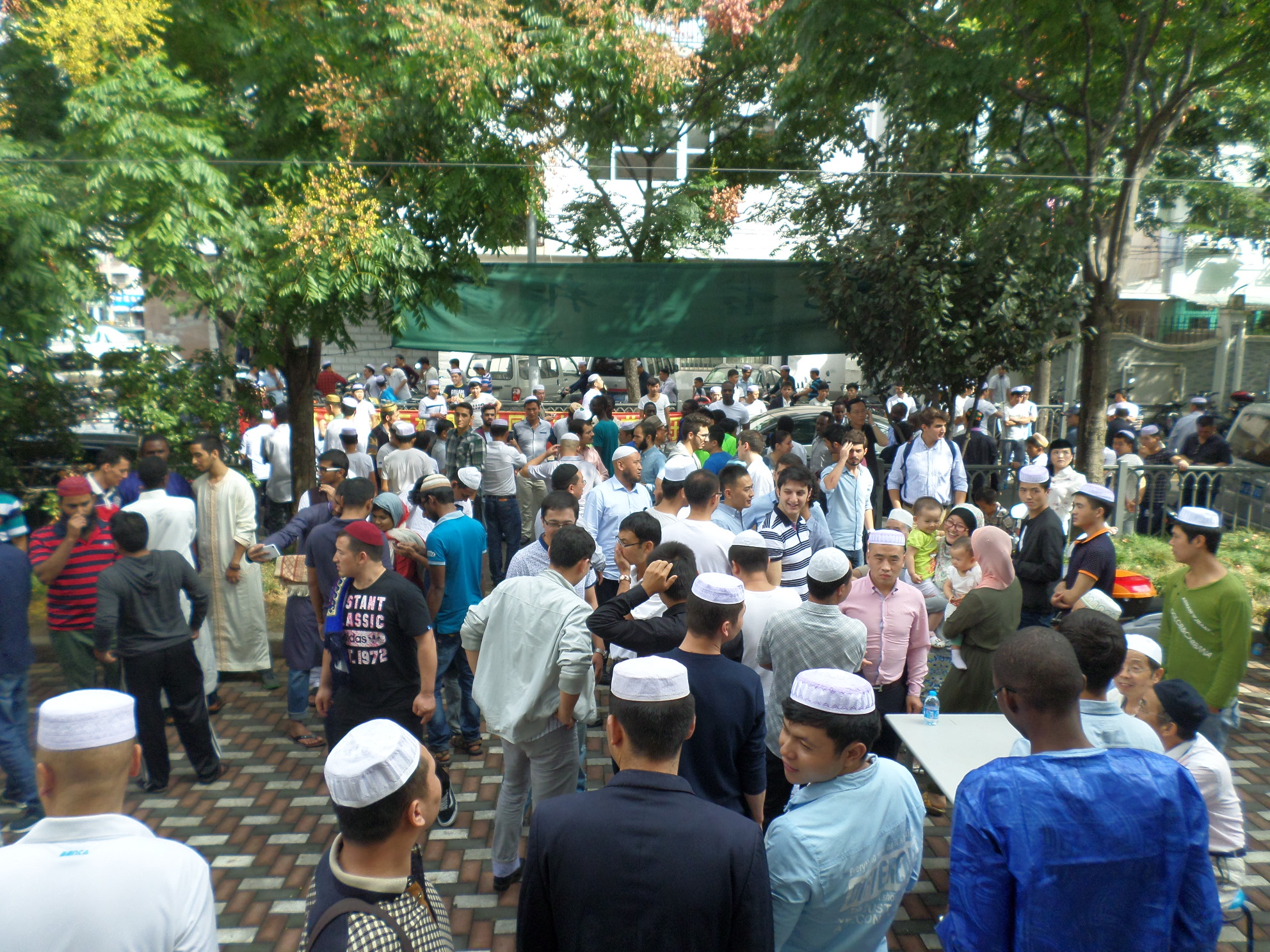
Eid al-Adha at Jiangwan Mosque, Shanghai.

In 2007, anticipating the coming "Year of the Pig" in the Chinese calendar, depictions of pigs were banned from CCTV "to avoid conflicts with ethnic minorities". This is believed to refer to China's population of 20 million Muslims (to whom pigs are considered "unclean").

In response to the 2015 Charlie Hebdo shooting, Chinese state-run media attacked Charlie Hebdo for publishing the cartoons which insulted Muhammad, with the state-run Xinhua News Agency advocating limits on freedom of speech, while another state-run newspaper Global Times said the attack was "payback" for what it characterized as Western colonialism, and it also accused Charlie Hebdo of trying to incite a clash of civilizations.

Different Muslim ethnic groups in different regions of China are treated differently by the Chinese government with regards to religious freedom. Religious freedom is present for Hui Muslims, who can practice their religion, build Mosques, and have their children attend Mosques, while more controls are placed on Uyghurs in Xinjiang. Since the 1980s, Islamic private schools have been supported and permitted by the Chinese government in Muslim areas, while only Xinjiang is specifically prevented from allowing these schools because of the separatist sentiment which exists there.

The Diplomat reported that Chinese government policy towards Uyghurs in Xinjiang is not directed towards Islam in general, but rather towards aggressively stamping out the Uyghur separatist threat.

Although religious education for children is officially forbidden by law in China, the Communist party allows Hui Muslims to violate this law and have their children educated in religion and attend mosques while the law is enforced on Uyghurs. After secondary education is completed, China then allows Hui students to embark on religious studies under the direction of an Imam.

Hui Muslims who are employed by the state are allowed to fast during Ramadan unlike Uyghurs who hold the same job positions, the amount of Hui who are going on Hajj is expanding, and Hui women are allowed to wear veils, while Uyghur women are discouraged from wearing them. The Xinjiang Muslim Association in China and the Chinese embassy in Malaysia have denied that Uyghurs are banned from fasting, inviting foreigners to come see it for themselves. The Star also reported in 2021 that Uyghurs in Xinjiang made prayers for Aidilfitri.

Hui religious schools are allowed to operate a massive autonomous network of mosques and schools that are run by a Hui Sufi leader, which was formed with the approval of the Chinese government even as he admitted to attending an event where Bin Laden spoke.

Uyghur views vary by the oasis where they live. China has historically favored Turpan and Hami. Uyghurs in Turfan and Hami and their leaders like Emin Khoja allied with the Qing against Uyghurs in Altishahr. During the Qing dynasty, China enfeoffed the rulers of Turpan and Hami (Kumul) as autonomous princes, while the rest of the Uyghurs in Altishahr (the Tarim Basin) were ruled by Begs. Uyghurs from Turpan and Hami were appointed by China as officials to rule over Uyghurs in the Tarim Basin. Turpan is more economically prosperous and it views China more positively than does the rebellious Kashgar, which is the most anti-Chinese oasis. Uyghurs in Turpan are treated leniently and favorably by China with regards to religious policies, while Kashgar is subjected to controls by the government. In Turpan and Hami, religion is viewed more positively by China than religion in Kashgar and Khotan in southern Xinjiang. Both Uyghur and Han Communist officials in Turpan turn a blind eye to the law and allow religious Islamic education for Uyghur children. Celebrating at religious functions and going on Hajj to Mecca is encouraged by the Chinese government, for Uyghur members of the Communist party. From 1979 to 1989, 350 mosques were built in Turpan. Han, Hui, and the Chinese government is viewed more positively by Uyghurs in Turpan, where the government has given them better economic, religious, and political treatment.

== Falun Gong ==
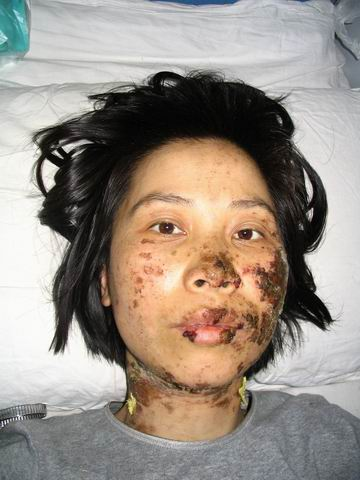
Gao Rongrong, a Falun Gong practitioner, was tortured to death in custody in 2005. She had been beaten by officials using electro-shock batons on her face and neck for 7 hours.

Following a period of meteoric growth of Falun Gong in the 1990s, the Communist Party launched a campaign to "eradicate" Falun Gong on 20 July 1999. The suppression is characterized by a multifaceted propaganda campaign, a program of enforced ideological conversion and re-education, and a variety of extralegal coercive measures such as arbitrary arrests, forced labor, and physical torture, sometimes resulting in death.

An extra-constitutional body called the 6-10 Office was created to lead the suppression of Falun Gong. The 6-10 Office helped establish a legal framework for the persecution of the group. In addition to banning Falun Gong activities and promotion, the Chinese government passed broader legislation aimed at suppressing Falun Gong and similar groups that it labeled as "Cults" or "heretical organizations," including the "Decision on Banning Heretical Organizations and Preventing and Punishing Heretical Activities" (1999) by the Standing Committee of the National People's Congress (NPC), the Supreme People's Court Notice 29 (1999), and the 2001 criminalization of organizing "cult" activities online. The Chinese government stated that these moves were necessary to protect "normal" religious activities in China. However, scholars and human rights organizations have criticized them as being used to create the illusion of rule-of-law, restrict religious freedom, legitimize the persecution of Falun Gong practitioners, and arm the CCP with the weapons to attack any religious or qigong movements that it perceives as a threat.

The authorities mobilized the state media apparatus, judiciary, police, army, the education system, families and workplaces against the group. The campaign is driven by large-scale propaganda through television, newspaper, radio and internet. There are reports of systematic torture, illegal imprisonment, forced labor, organ harvesting and abusive psychiatric measures, with the apparent aim of forcing practitioners to recant their belief in Falun Gong.

Foreign observers estimate that hundreds of thousands and perhaps millions of Falun Gong practitioners have been detained in "re-education through labor" camps, prisons and other detention facilities for refusing to renounce the spiritual practice. Former prisoners have reported that Falun Gong practitioners consistently received "the longest sentences and worst treatment" in labor camps, and in some facilities Falun Gong practitioners formed the substantial majority of detainees. As of 2009 at least 2,000 Falun Gong adherents had been tortured to death in the persecution campaign, with some observers putting the number much higher. In 2022, it was reported that 172 Falun Gong followers died following persecution.

Some international observers and judicial authorities have described the campaign against Falun Gong as a genocide. In 2009, courts in Spain and Argentina indicted senior Chinese officials for genocide and crimes against humanity for their role in orchestrating the suppression of Falun Gong.

However, the Falun Gong is generally considered a spiritual movement and not a religion by the ROC government. The leading proponent of Falun Gong in Taiwan reports that membership exceeds 500,000 and continues to grow rapidly.

=== Organ harvesting allegations ===
In 2006, allegations emerged that the vital organs of non-consenting Falun Gong practitioners had been used to supply China's organ tourism industry. The Kilgour-Matas report stated in 2006, "We believe that there has been and continues today to be large scale organ seizures from unwilling Falun Gong practitioners". Ethan Gutmann interviewed over 100 witnesses and alleged that about 65,000 Falun Gong prisoners were killed for their organs from 2000 to 2008. In 2008, two United Nations Special Rapporteurs reiterated their requests for "the Chinese government to fully explain the allegation of taking vital organs from Falun Gong practitioners". The Chinese government has denied the allegation.

In August 2024, The Diplomat reported its interview with Cheng Pei Ming, the first known survivor of China's forced organ harvesting. Cheng, a Falun Gong practitioner, recounted how he was subjected to repeated blood tests and a subsequent forced surgery while imprisoned in China and later discovered during medical exams in the U.S. that segments of his liver and a portion of his lung had been surgically removed.

== See also ==
- Religion in China
- Chinese laws regarding religious activities

== Bibliography ==
- Fischer, Andrew Martin (2005). "Close encounters of an Inner-Asian kind: Tibetan–Muslim coexistence and conflict in Tibet, past and present" (PDF). CSRC Working Paper Series (Working Paper no.68). Crisis States Research Centre. Archived from the original (PDF) on 3 January 2006.
- Lin, Hsaio-ting (2011). Tibet and Nationalist China's Frontier: Intrigues and Ethnopolitics, 1928-49. UBC Press. ISBN 978-0-7748-5988-2.
- Overmyer, Daniel L. (2009). Local Religion in North China in the Twentieth Century the Structure and Organization of Community Rituals and Beliefs (PDF). Leiden; Boston, MA: Brill. ISBN 978-90-474-2936-4. Archived from the original (PDF) on 16 June 2015.
