= Xiagang Church =

Church in Xiamen, China

Xiagang Church was a church located in the sub-provincial city of Xiamen, in the southeast portion of the province of Fujian, in the People's Republic of China. Xiagang Church had been a Presbyterian faith church also affiliated with the Reformed Church in America and the London Missionary Society.

As one of the treaty ports, Xiamen was historically important for the spread of Christianity in China. In 1900, Pastor Yang Huaide (1868-1946) became the first pastor of Xiagang Church. Yang served 42 years with the church. In the early 1930s, the church had a congregation of a few hundred members. After Yang's death, one offshoot of the Xiagang Church became the Xunsiding Church which was closed by the Chinese Communist Party in 2019. During the 1950s, Xiagang Church had to close, with church meetings continuing in private homes.

== See also ==
- Antireligious campaigns of the Chinese Communist Party
