= Islam in China (1912–present) =

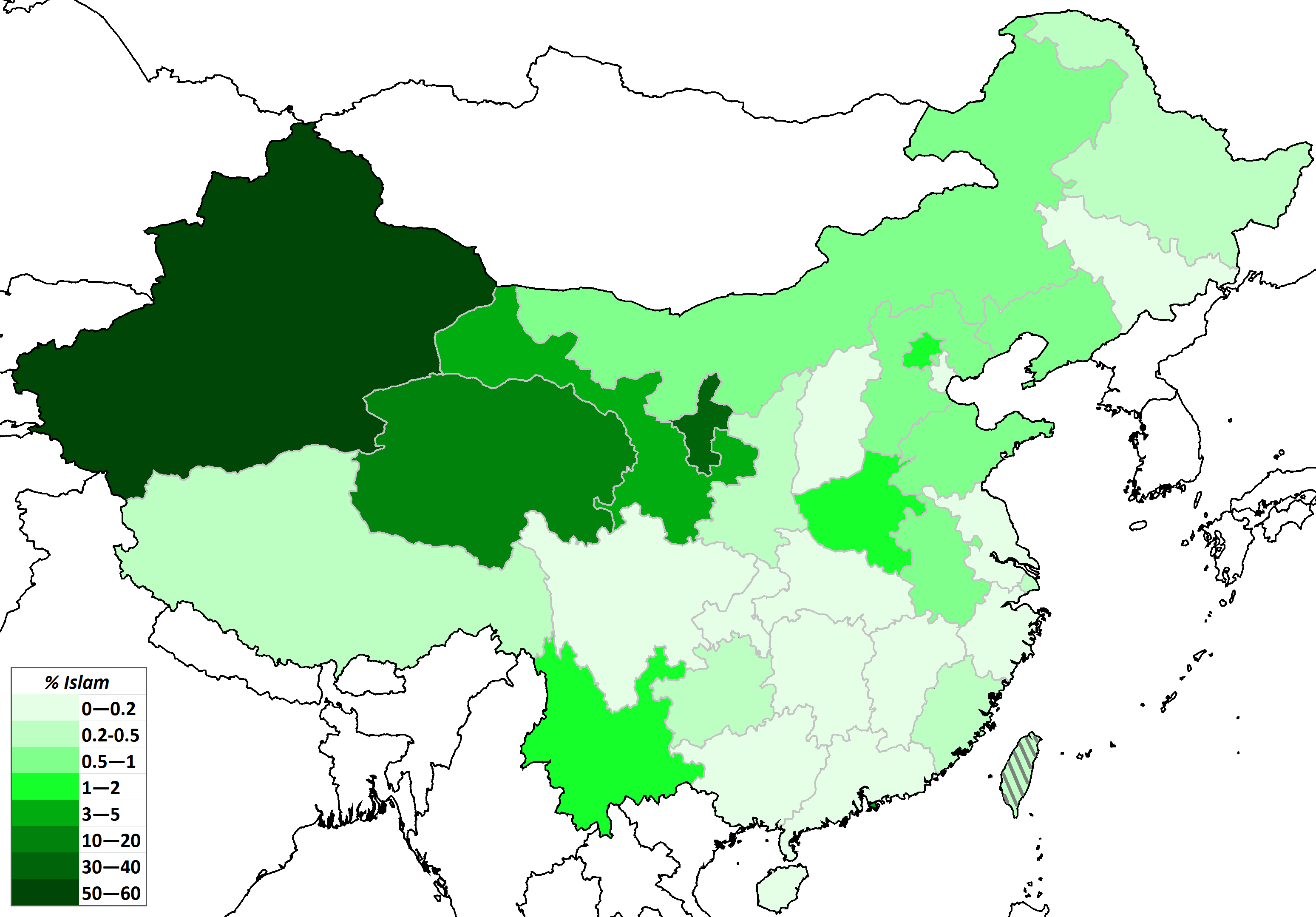
The percentage of Muslim population in the provinces of China, According to 2010 data.

After the fall of the Qing dynasty following the Xinhai Revolution (1911–1912), Sun Yat-sen, who led the new Republic of China (1912–1949), immediately proclaimed that the country belonged equally to the Han, Hui (Muslim), Meng (Mongol), and Tsang (Tibetan) peoples. When the People's Republic of China was established in 1949, Chinese Muslims suffered political repression along with all other religious groups in China, especially during the Cultural Revolution (1966–1976).

In modern-day China, there is a series of human rights abuses against Chinese Muslims, particularly the persecution of Uyghurs in the autonomous region of Xinjiang.

== Republic of China ==
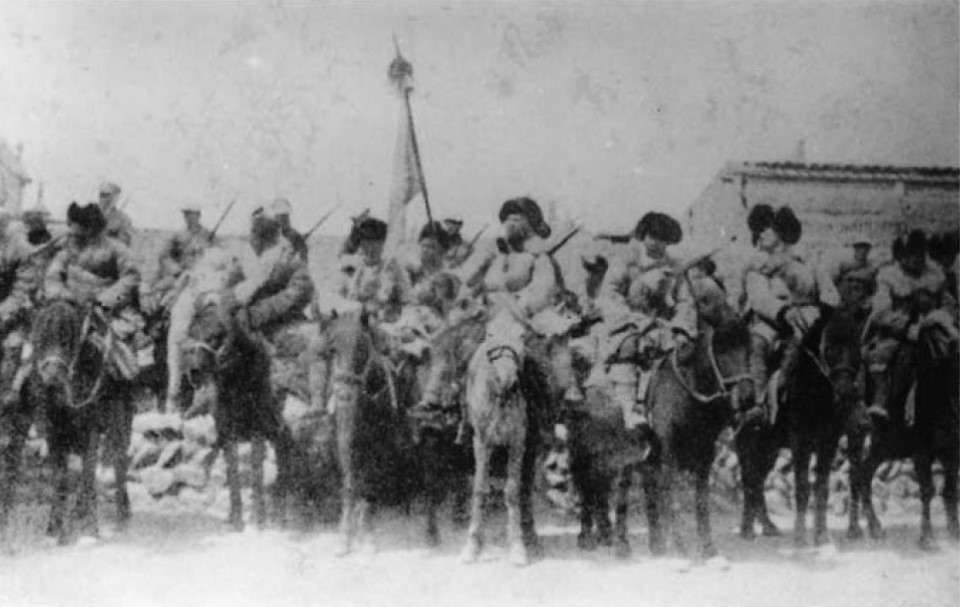
Chinese Muslim guerrilla fighters gather to oppose the Japanese invaders in Northwestern China, c. 1939

In the first decade of the 20th century, it has been estimated that there were 20 million Muslims in China proper (that is, China excluding the regions of Mongolia and Xinjiang). Of these, almost half resided in Gansu, over a third in Shaanxi (as defined at that time) and the rest in Yunnan.

The Hui Muslim community was divided in its support for the Xinhai Revolution (1911–1912). The Hui Muslims of Shaanxi supported the revolutionaries and the Hui Muslims of Gansu supported the Qing. The native Hui Muslims (Mohammedans) of Xi'an (Shaanxi province) joined the Han Chinese revolutionaries in slaughtering the entire 20,000 Manchu population of Xi'an. The native Hui Muslims of Gansu province led by general Ma Anliang sided with the Qing and prepared to attack the anti-Qing revolutionaries of Xi'an city. Only some wealthy Manchus who were ransomed and Manchu females survived. Wealthy Han Chinese seized Manchu girls to become their slaves and poor Han Chinese troops seized young Manchu women to be their wives. Young pretty Manchu girls were also seized by Hui Muslims of Xi'an during the massacre and brought up as Muslims.

The Manchu Qing dynasty fell in 1912, and the Republic of China (1912–1949) was established by Sun Yat-sen, who immediately proclaimed that the country belonged equally to the Han, Hui (Muslim), Meng (Mongol), and Tsang (Tibetan) peoples. This led to some improvement in relations between these different ethnic groups in China. The end of the Qing dynasty also marked an increase in Sino-foreign interaction. This led to increased contact between Muslim minorities in China and the Muslim-majority countries of the Middle East. By 1939, at least 33 Hui Muslims had studied at the Al-Azhar University in Cairo, Egypt. In 1912, the Chinese Muslim Federation was formed in the capital Nanjing. Similar organization formed in Beijing (1912), Shanghai (1925), and Jinan (1934). Academic activities within the Muslim community also flourished. Before the Second Sino-Japanese War (1937–1945), there existed more than a hundred known Muslim periodicals. Thirty journals were published between 1911 and 1937. Although Linxia remained the center for religious activities, many Muslim cultural activities had shifted to Beijing. National organizations like the Chinese Muslim Association were established for Muslims. Muslims had a substantial presence among military leaders and the Nationalist government.

The New Culture Movement influenced elite Muslim men to begin establishing women's mosques as an effort towards modernization. These institutions converged with women's schools.

During the Second Sino-Japanese War the Japanese followed what has been referred to as a "killing policy" and destroyed many mosques. According to Wan Lei, "Statistics showed that the Japanese destroyed 220 mosques and killed countless Hui people by April 1941." After the Rape of Nanking mosques in Nanjing were found to be filled with dead bodies. They also followed a policy of economic oppression which involved the destruction of mosques and Hui communities and made many Hui jobless and homeless. Another policy was one of deliberate humiliation. This included soldiers smearing mosques with pork fat, forcing Hui to butcher pigs to feed the soldiers, and forcing girls to supposedly train as geishas and singers but in fact made them serve as sex slaves. Hui cemeteries were destroyed for military reasons. Many Hui fought in the war against Japan. In 1937, during the Battle of Beiping–Tianjin the Chinese government was notified by Muslim General Ma Bufang of the Ma clique that he was prepared to bring the fight to the Japanese in a telegram message. Immediately after the Marco Polo Bridge Incident, Ma Bufang arranged for a cavalry division under the Muslim General Ma Biao to be sent east to battle the Japanese. Ethnic Turkic Salar Muslims made up the majority of the first cavalry division which was sent by Ma Bufang.

The Hui Muslim county of Dachang was subjected to slaughter by the Japanese.

Muslims affiliated with the Kuomintang moved to Taiwan after the Chinese Civil War. In the Kuomintang Islamic insurgency, Muslim Kuomintang National Revolutionary Army forces in Northwest China, in Gansu, Qinghai, Ningxia, Xinjiang, as well as Yunnan, continued an unsuccessful insurgency against the communists from 1950 to 1958, after the general civil war was over.

=== Islamic education before 1949 ===
Muslim Kuomintang officials in the Republic of China government supported the Chengda Teachers Academy, which helped usher in a new era of Islamic education in China, promoting nationalism and Chinese language among Muslims, and fully incorporating them into the main aspects of Chinese society. The Ministry of Education provided funds to the Chinese Islamic National Salvation Federation for Chinese Muslim's education. The President of the federation was General Bai Chongxi (Pai Chung-hsi) and the vice president was Tang Kesan (Tang Ko-san). 40 Sino-Arabic primary schools were founded in Ningxia by its Governor Ma Hongkui.

Imam Wang Jingzhai studied at Al-Azhar University in Egypt along with several other Chinese Muslim students, the first Chinese students in modern times to study in the Middle East. Wang recalled his experience teaching at madrassas in the provinces of Henan (Yu), Hebei (Ji), and Shandong (Lu) which were outside of the traditional stronghold of Muslim education in northwest China, and where the living conditions were poorer and the students had a much tougher time than the northwestern students. In 1931 China sent five students to study at Al-Azhar in Egypt, among them was Muhammad Ma Jian and they were the first Chinese to study at Al-Azhar.

Hui Muslims from the Central Plains (Zhongyuan) differed in their view of women's education than Hui Muslims from the northwestern provinces, with the Hui from the Central Plains provinces like Henan having a history of women's Mosques and religious schooling for women, while Hui women in northwestern provinces were kept in the house. However, in northwestern China reformers started bringing female education in the 1920s. In Linxia, Gansu, a secular school for Hui girls was founded by the Muslim warlord Ma Bufang, the school was named Shuada Suqin Women's Primary School after his wife Ma Suqin who was also involved in its founding. Hui Muslim refugees fled to northwest China from the central plains after the Japanese invasion of China, where they continued to practice women's education and build women's mosque communities, while women's education was not adopted by the local northwestern Hui Muslims and the two different communities continued to differ in this practice.

== People's Republic of China ==
=== 20th century ===
The People's Republic of China (PRC) was founded in 1949, in the aftermath of the Chinese Communist Revolution (1946–1950). Ten ethnic groups that were traditionally Muslim became part of the state's recognized ethnicities. During the Land Reform Movement, Muslims received preferential policies, as Article 3 of the Agrarian Reform Law of 1950 expressly exempted mosque-owned lands from expropriation and redistribution, unlike ancestral shrines, Buddhist monasteries, and Christian churches. However, by 1958, the central leadership had ordered all mosques’ land to be confiscated to prepare for the establishment of People's Communes.

Through many of the early years, there were tremendous upheavals which culminated in the Cultural Revolution (1966–1976). During the Cultural Revolution, Islam, along with all other religions in the country, including the traditional Chinese religion, were persecuted by the atheist Red Guards, who had attempted to eradicate them through a series of atheistic and anti-religious campaigns, encouraged by the Chinese Communist Party (CCP) to smash the Four Olds. Traditional Chinese, Confucian, and Buddhist temples and monasteries, Christian churches, and Muslim mosques were all attacked.

In 1975, in what would be known as the Shadian incident, there was an uprising among Hui in what was the only large scale ethnic rebellion during the Cultural Revolution. In crushing the rebellion, the People's Liberation Army massacred 1,600 Hui with MIG fighter jets used to fire rockets onto the village. Following the fall of the Gang of Four, apologies and reparations were made.

After the advent of Deng Xiaoping in 1979, Muslims enjoyed a period of liberalisation. New legislation gave all minorities the freedom to use their own spoken and written languages, to develop their own culture and education and to practice their religion. More Chinese Muslims than ever before were allowed to go on the Hajj.

There is an ethnic separatist movement among the Uighur minority, who are a Turkic people with their own language. Uighur separatists are intent on establishing the East Turkestan Republic, which existed for a few years in the 1930s and as a Soviet Communist puppet state, the Second East Turkestan Republic 1944–1950. The Soviet Union supported Uighur separatists against China during the Sino-Soviet split. Following the collapse of the Soviet Union, China feared potential separatist goals of Muslim majority in Xinjiang. An April, 1996 agreement between Russia, Kazakhstan, Tajikistan and Kyrgyzstan, however, assures China of avoiding a military conflict. Other Muslim states have also asserted that they have no intentions of becoming involved in China's internal affairs.

China banned a book titled "Xing Fengsu" ("Sexual Customs") which insulted Islam and placed its authors under arrest in 1989 after protests in Lanzhou and Beijing by Chinese Hui Muslims, during which the Chinese police provided protection to the Hui Muslim protestors, and the Chinese government organized public burnings of the book. The Chinese government assisted them and gave in to their demands because Hui do not have a separatist movement, unlike the Uyghurs, Hui Muslim protestors who violently rioted by vandalizing property during the protests against the book were let off by the Chinese government and went unpunished while Uyghur protestors were imprisoned.

Since the 1980s, Hui and Uyghur Muslims, like other minority ethnicities, have been subject to affirmative action policies, aiming to narrow the socioeconomic gap between the majority Han and ethnic minorities. Islamic private schools (Sino-Arabic schools (中阿學校)) have been supported and permitted by the Chinese government among Muslim areas, only specifically excluding Xinjiang from allowing these schools because of separatist sentiment there.

=== 21st century ===
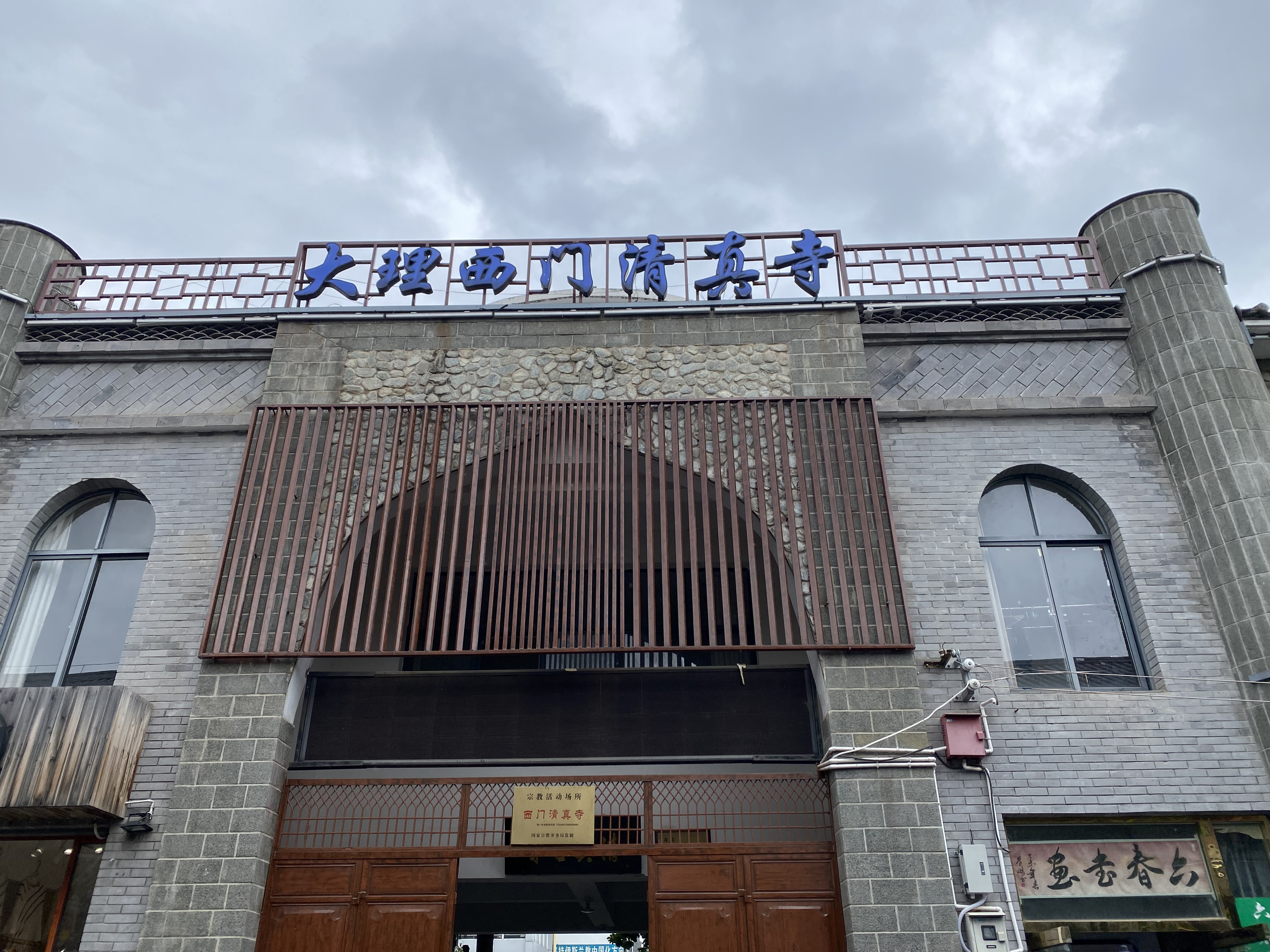
Mosque with dome removed due to Sinicization policy

During the 21st century, China has moved to significantly increase its repression of Muslims, particularly Uyghurs in Xinjiang. In doing so, the Chinese government has outlawed traditional gatherings, with police forces increasingly monitoring Muslim religious ceremonies such as weddings and funerals. Authorities have conducted raids on religious classes, suppressed the printing of "unauthorized" religious texts, razed mosques, and forced imams to undergo political indoctrination. Uyghurs have been incarcerated for teaching Quranic verses to their children.

In 2007, China Central Television (CCTV), the People's Republic of China's state-run television station ordered major advertising agencies not to use pig images, cartoons or slogans "to avoid conflicts with ethnic minorities", a reference to China's Muslims. In response to the 2015 Charlie Hebdo shooting Chinese state-run media attacked Charlie Hebdo for publishing the cartoons insulting Muhammad, with the state-run Xinhua News Agency advocated limiting freedom of speech, while another state-run newspaper Global Times said the attack was "payback" for what it characterised as Western colonialism and accusing Charlie Hebdo of trying to incite a clash of civilizations.

In the past, celebrating at religious functions and going on Hajj to Mecca was encouraged by the Chinese government for Uyghur members of the CCP. From 1979 to 1989, 350 mosques were built in Turpan. Three decades later, the government was building "re-education" camps for interning Muslims without charge in Turpan. The Hajj became heavily restricted and required explicit permission from the Islamic Association of China. In 2017, the Chinese government officially prohibited Muslims in Xinjiang from naming their babies "Muhammad" among other Islamic names.

In November 2017, Chinese users discovered the Salah (Islamic prayer) notification feature in Huawei Mate 10 phone, on the company's website for mainland China. It was viewed as an unjustified promotion of Islam given that Muslims are a minority religious group in mainland China that make up only about 1–2% of the population. Significant backlash has formed on the Chinese internet and some have even tried to boycott Huawei phones for including such feature, and make fun of the phone by calling it "the first phone with a Halal prayer feature" and describe the event as the "Islamic conversion of Huawei".

Later, Huawei published an official statement via Sina Weibo, stating that the feature was only a personalized notification service designed for "certain overseas regions" that was not available in China. Netizens questioned why promotion of that feature was available on the company's Chinese website in the first place if that was not the intended area but those comments were deleted before getting any response. A Taoist priest commented that the mosque-finding service on the device was also available in mainland China, inconsistent with the official explanation about these religious features. After Huawei published the official statement, many news reports and discussions made on Chinese online media or Chinese discussion platforms were made inaccessible or removed from the internet.

In August 2023, General Secretary of the Chinese Communist Party Xi Jinping called the sinicization of Islam in China to be deepened. In March 2024, Xinjiang's Chinese Communist Party Committee Secretary, Ma Xingrui, stated that the sinicization of Islam in Xinjiang is "inevitable." Prohibitions on fasting during Ramadan are couched in terms of protecting residents' free will.

==== Xinjiang re-education camps ====
Since the Chinese Communist Revolution (1946−1950) that occurred during the 20th century and throughout the first half of the 21st century, the Chinese Communist government and authorities of the PRC have reportedly detained more than a million Chinese Muslims in re-education camps. Most of the people who have been targeted and arbitrarily detained in these re-education camps are the Uyghurs, a predominantly Turkic-speaking Chinese-Muslim ethnic group which inhabits primarily the Northwestern region of Xinjiang, alongside Kazakhs, Kyrgyz, and other Turkic Muslim ethnic minorities. Core strategies of the Chinese government's campaign against the Uyghurs and other Turkic Muslim ethnic minorities include identity-based persecution, systematized mass detention and surveillance, forced abortions and sterilizations, forced birth control, forced labor, forced assimilation, torture, brainwashing, and gang rape.

In May 2018, the western news media reported that hundreds of thousands of Muslims were being detained in massive extrajudicial re-education camps in western Xinjiang. These were called "re-education" camps and later, "vocational training centres" by the government, intended for the "rehabilitation and redemption" to combat terrorism and religious extremism. In August 2018, the United Nations said that credible reports had led it to estimate that up to a million Uighurs and other Muslims were being held in "something that resembles a massive internment camp that is shrouded in secrecy". The U.N.'s International Convention on the Elimination of All Forms of Racial Discrimination said that some estimates indicated that up to 2 million Uighurs and other Muslims were held in "political camps for indoctrination", in a "no-rights zone".

By that time, conditions in Xinjiang had deteriorated so far that they were described by informed political scientists as "Orwellian" and observers drew comparisons with Nazi concentration camps.

In response to the UN panel's finding of indefinite detention without due process, the Chinese government delegation officially conceded that it was engaging in widespread "resettlement and re-education" and State media described the controls in Xinjiang as "intense".

On 31 August 2018, the United Nations committee called on the Chinese government to "end the practice of detention without lawful charge, trial and conviction", to release the detained persons, to provide specifics as to the number of interred individuals and the reasons for their detention, and to investigate the allegations of "racial, ethnic and ethno-religious profiling". A BBC report quoted an unnamed Chinese official as saying that "Uighurs enjoyed full rights" but also admitting that "those deceived by religious extremism... shall be assisted by resettlement and re-education".

=== Different Treatment of Hui Muslims and Uyghur Muslims ===
Different Muslim ethnic groups in different regions are treated differently by the government of the People's Republic of China in regards to religious freedom. Hui Muslims, who can practice their religion, build Mosques, and have their children attend Mosques, while more controls are placed on Uyghurs in Xinjiang. Hui Muslims who are employed by the state are allowed to fast during Ramadan unlike Uyghurs in the same positions, the amount of Hui going on Hajj is expanding, and Hui women are allowed to wear veils, while Uyghur women are discouraged from wearing them and Uyghurs find it difficult to get passports to go on Hajj. China does not enforce the law against children attending Mosques in non-Uyghurs in areas outside of Xinjiang.

Although religious education for children is officially forbidden by law in China, the Communist party allows Hui Muslims to violate this law and have their children educated in religion and attend Mosques while the law is enforced on Uyghurs. After secondary education is completed, China then allows Hui students who are willing to embark on religious studies under an Imam.

=== Tibetan-Muslim sectarian violence ===
In Tibet, the majority of Muslims are Hui people. Hatred between Tibetans and Muslims stems from events during the Muslim warlord Ma Bufang's rule in Qinghai such as Ngolok rebellions (1917–49) and the Sino-Tibetan War. Violence subsided after 1949 under Communist Party repression but reignited as strictures were relaxed. Riots broke out in March 2008 between Muslims and Tibetans over incidents such as suspected human bones in and deliberate contamination of soups served in Muslim-owned establishments and overpricing of balloons by Muslim vendors. Tibetans attacked Muslim restaurants. Fires set by Tibetans resulted in Muslim deaths and riots. The Tibetan exile community sought to suppress reports reaching the international community, fearing damage to the cause of Tibetan autonomy and fuelling Hui Muslim support of government repression of Tibetans generally. In addition, Chinese-speaking Hui have problems with Tibetan Hui (the Tibetan speaking Kache minority of Muslims). The main mosque in Lhasa was burned down by Tibetans during the unrest.

The majority of Tibetans viewed the wars against Iraq and Afghanistan after 9/11 positively and it had the effect of galvanizing anti-Muslim attitudes among Tibetans and resulted in an anti-Muslim boycott against Muslim owned businesses. Tibetan Buddhists propagate a false libel that Muslims cremate their Imams and use the ashes to convert Tibetans to Islam by making Tibetans inhale the ashes, even though the Tibetans seem to be aware that Muslims practice burial and not cremation since they frequently clash against proposed Muslim cemeteries in their area.

== See also ==
- History of Islam in China
