= Murder of Wu Shuoyan =

2014 murder in Zhaoyuan, China

- Location: Zhaoyuan, Shandong, China
- Date: 28 May 2014
- Attack type: Beating
- Weapons: Mops, chair
- Victim: Wu Shuoyan
- Assailants: Zhang Lidong; Zhang Qiaolian; Zhang Fan; Zhang Hang; Zhang Duo; Lü Yingchun
- No. of participants: 6
- Verdict: Guilty
- Convictions: Murder
- Convicted: 5

On 28 May 2014, 37-year-old Wu Shuoyan was murdered in Zhaoyuan, Shandong, China. The perpetrators claimed to be part of a religious sect called Eastern Lightning (also known as "Church of Almighty God") and had attacked Wu after she was deemed an "evil spirit" for rebuffing attempts of conversion by the group. The killing became known as the McDonald's murder (Chinese: 招远麦当劳杀人案) due to occurring inside a McDonald's fast food restaurant, generating considerable attention in China, with footage of the murder widely distributed.

Authorities stated the attackers were members of Eastern Lightning. In the wake of the murder, authorities engaged in widespread arrests of the group's members. Covering the trial and the confessions of the assailants, reporters for the Chinese daily The Beijing News wrote that the perpetrators were in fact not members of Eastern Lightning at the time of the murder, a position also maintained by some Western scholars who wrote about Eastern Lightning.

== Murder ==
External videos
- Smartphone footage of the murder of Wu Shuoyan

Wu Shuoyan (吴硕艳) worked as a salesperson in a clothing store at a mall, which the McDonald's was a part of. She was married and had a five-year-old son at the time of her murder.

Wu was waiting after work to meet her husband and son in the mall McDonald's. While Wu was there, a group of six persons (including a 12-year-old), entered the restaurant. They announced that they were "missionaries". After presenting their religious message, they demanded that customers supply their cell phone numbers for future contacts. Wu was twice asked to provide her phone number. She refused.

Wu was then beaten by two of the "missionaries", who used mops the group had brought with them. A chair was thrown at Wu, and her head and face were stomped. One attacker screamed "Go die! Evil spirit!" while another shouted at customers: "Whoever interferes will die!". The attack was captured on camera, with footage widely shared online.

Wu died from her injuries. Police arrived and arrested the assailants. One witness told media: "The little boy who was with [the assailants] was so calm. Even when the police arrived, he kicked the victim in the head, yelling 'evil goes to hell'".

== Investigation ==
The perpetrators consisted of the Zhang extended family, who were originally from Wuji County, Hebei: All six were unemployed or not enrolled in education.

- Zhang Lidong (张立冬; 1959–2015), former owner of a small textile business
- Zhang Qiaolian (张巧联; b. 1990), lover of Zhang Lidong
- Zhang Fan (张帆; 1984–2015), daughter of Zhang Lidong from his previous marriage
- Zhang Hang (张航; b. 1996), daughter of Zhang Lidong from his previous marriage
- Zhang Duo (张舵; b. 2001), son of Zhang Lidong from his previous marriage
- Lü Yingchun (吕迎春; b. 1975), a woman local to Shandong who lived with the Zhang family

On 31 May Zhang Lidong's jailhouse interview was broadcast in which he showed no remorse for Wu's murder, saying "I beat her with all my might and stamped on her too. She was a demon. We had to destroy her." Zhang reported having been a member of a group worshipping "Almighty God", that Chinese authorities identified with Eastern Lightning. Police reported finding Eastern Lightning literature in the Zhang home. It was reported that Zhang Qiaolian and Zhang Hang acknowledged guilt while the three others voiced no remorse.

== Trial ==
Zhang Lidong at trial.

Zhang Duo was too young to stand trial, but the other five perpetrators were committed to trial and appeared on 21 August 2014, before the Intermediate People's Court of Yantai, in the Shandong province.

At trial, Lü Yingchun explained that it was indispensable to kill the saleswoman, as she was a particularly dangerous "evil spirit": "Zhang Hang asked that lady for her phone number, but she refused to give it to her. When I became conscious of it, I found out that we had been attacked and drained by an 'evil spirit,' which caused us to be weak and helpless. The two of us identified her as that 'evil spirit' and cursed her with words. Not only did she not listen, her attack got even stronger. […] During the 'demon's' attack on us, Zhang Fan and I became gradually aware that the woman must die, otherwise it would devour everybody. […] The clash between the woman and us was a battle between two spirits. The others could not see it and neither could they understand it. The police could not understand it as well."

Two of the defendants, Zhang Lidong and his daughter Zhang Fan, were sentenced to death and executed on 2 February 2015. As for the other three defendants, Lü Yingchun, was sentenced to life in prison, Zhang Hang was sentenced to ten years of jail and Zhang Qiaolian to seven years.

In May 2017, Lü Yingchun's sentence was reduced to 21 year and 3 months due to her good behaviour in prison.

== Reactions ==
Chinese authorities stated that the perpetrators belonged to Eastern Lightning. Mainstream Western media largely stated the same. Even prior to the attack, the sect had been banned in China, and in the wake of the murder, authorities engaged in widespread arrests of Eastern Lightning members. Representatives from Eastern Lightning publicly condemned the murder, stating it had been committed by "psychopaths" who had nothing to do with them.

Covering the trial in 2014, The Beijing News, a daily newspaper owned by the Beijing Committee of the Chinese Communist Party, but with a reputation of independent reporting, published on 22 August 2014 (one day after the trial), two articles casting doubts on the official version. Reporter Yang Feng published the confessions of the main defendants during the trial, including passages where both Lü Yingchun and Zhang Fan claimed that theirs was a different "Almighty God" church from the one also known as Eastern Lightning and whose leader is Zhao Weishan. While Eastern Lightning worships as Almighty God a woman called Yang Xiangbin, the group responsible for the murder believed that God had simultaneously incarnated as a single soul shared by the two female bodies of Lü Yingchun and Zhang Fan. As reported by Yang Feng, Zhang Fan stated at trial that, "I am God in his substance. Lü Yingchun is also God in his substance. The relationship between Lü Yingchun and me is, we are two bodies in the flesh but we share a same soul." She went on to say that, "the 'Almighty God Church' I believe in is not a cult, while Zhao Weishan's 'Church of Almighty God' is a cult."

Yang Feng also reported that Lü Yingchun stated, "The state has defined Zhao Weishan's fake 'Church of Almighty God as a cult organization. We also call them 'evil spirits.' Only Zhang Fan and I, the eldest sons, represent the true 'Almighty God Church.' Zhang Fan and I are the only true spokespersons for the 'Almighty God.' The state crackdown deals with Zhao Weishan's 'Almighty God,' not our 'Almighty God.' They are fake 'Almighty Gods.' We are the real ones."

In the same issue of The Beijing News, a team of five journalists led by Xiao Hui and Zhang Yongsheng published an investigative piece on the history of the group responsible for the murder, that they nicknamed "the Almighty God family." They stated that both Lü Yingchun and Zhang Fan had some contacts with Zhao Weishan's Church of Almighty God as young women, but later the main influence on their group were two independent preachers from Baotou, Inner Mongolia, Li Youwang and Fan Bin, although Lü and Zhang broke with them when the preachers refused to acknowledge that the two women were divine incarnations.

One day before the Beijing News articles, in the day the trial was held, the non-government-owned Phoenix Television broadcast in its program Social Watch an interview Zhang Fan was allowed to grant in jail. She said that, in her youth, she was interested in Eastern Lighting but denied that she had direct contacts with that church. "I never managed to contact the Church of Almighty God because they were secretive people, and I was not able to find them," she said.

In her book on Eastern Lighting, published by Brill in 2015, Australian scholar Emily Dunn quoted Yang Feng's article and noted that, "International media outlets repeated the Chinese assessment of the Church of Almighty God as bizarre and violent. What they overlooked were Lu Yingchun and Zhang Fan's statements to the court that although they started out as members of Eastern Lightning (in 1998 and 2007 respectively), they had outgrown it." By 2020, an article on the Church of Almighty God published in The Daily Beast by veteran reporter Donald Kirk found that "today, scholars tend to support the response of [Church of Almighty God] members that another group was to blame for the McDonald's murder."

Meanwhile, Chinese authorities had announced that both Lü Yingchun and the younger sister of the executed Zhang Fan, Zhang Hang, had been successfully "re-educated" in jail, and that Lü Yingchun was willing to join the official campaign against cults by writing a memoir and lecturing to fellow inmates. Although Lü maintained that hers was a group based on the belief that she and Zhang Fan were the real Almighty God, she also blamed books and Web sites of Eastern Lightning for having "ideologically corrupted" them in their youth.

The murder prompted a wave of government campaigns to crack down on what the state deems as "evil cults". Eastern Lightning's mode of expansion is to proselytize among independent Protestant congregations (commonly termed house churches), and many leaders among these Protestant communities have criticized Eastern Lightning and assisted the state's efforts.
