= The Church of Jesus Christ of Latter-day Saints in China =

The Church of Jesus Christ of Latter-day Saints in the People's Republic of China
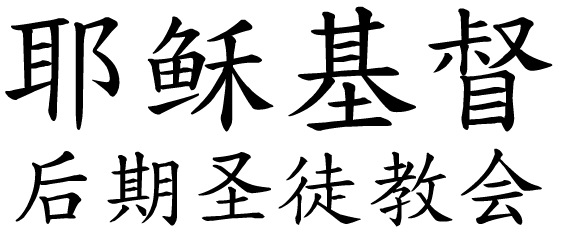
- The logo of the LDS Church in Simplified Chinese

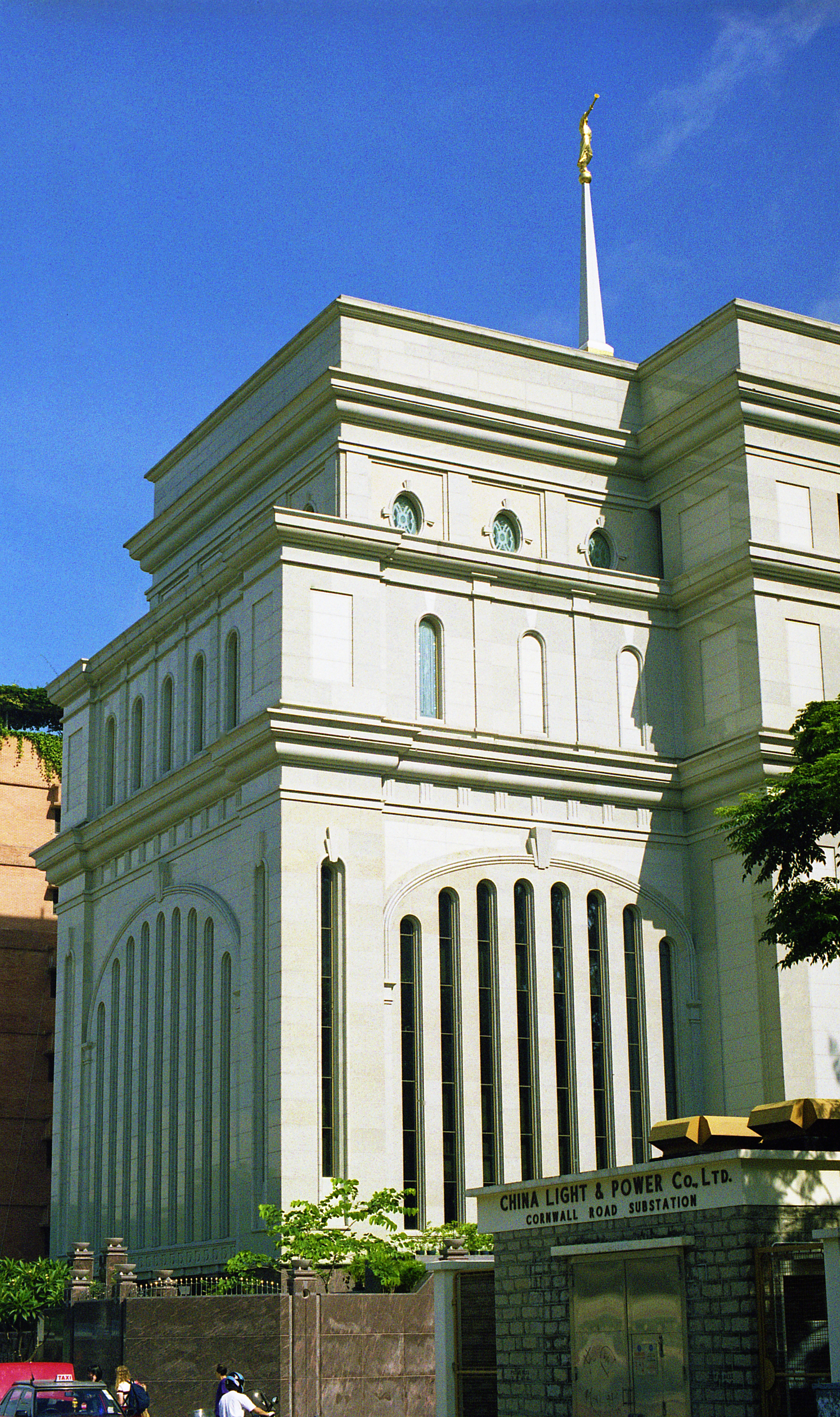
- The Hong Kong China Temple
- Area: Asia
- Temples: 1 operating; 1 announced; 2 total

The Church of Jesus Christ of Latter-day Saints (simplified Chinese: 耶稣基督后期圣徒教会; traditional Chinese: 耶穌基督後期聖徒教會; pinyin: yēsūjīdūhòuqīshèngtújiàohuì) has a limited presence in the People's Republic of China and is subject to legal restrictions in mainland China. China has five officially recognized religions recognized by the state government, and this church is not one of them. Although returned overseas Chinese converts and foreign Latter-day Saints who live in China did attend in-country sacrament meetings until its ban in 2025, Chinese nationals and foreigners did not attend the same meetings, and the church has directed its non-Chinese members to avoid proselytizing in mainland China. Under the general secretaryship of Xi Jinping, various congregations have been banned throughout the country.

== History ==
=== Qing Dynasty ===
Church missionaries briefly visited Asia in 1851. Three missionaries—Hosea Stout, James Lewis, and Chapman Duncan—arrived in Hong Kong, which was, at that time, a British colony, on April 28, 1853. Missionary efforts in Hong Kong did not succeed, as both locals and colonists did not welcome the religious message and the local climate, culture, and language posed problems for proselytism. The three missionaries could not afford to learn the language and received negative press coverage in Hong Kong. Meanwhile, another religious movement, the God Worshipping Society, instigated the Taiping Rebellion, preventing missionaries from going to the mainland. The missionaries left on June 22, 1853; no further missionary activities were conducted in China in the 19th century.

In 1910, missionary Alma O. Taylor visited China. His report to church leaders on the possibility of a proselytization campaign was negative.

=== Republic of China ===
Future church president, David O. McKay, travelled to China with Hugh Cannon in 1921, symbolically consecrating China to missionary efforts without beginning an actual missionary campaign. Cannon wrote that in the aftermath of China's ongoing famine, unrest, and recent humiliations on the part of foreign powers, China needed "someone to plead her cause before the throne of grace." McKay's dedicatory prayer hoped for political stability and a cessation of superstition.

=== People's Republic of China ===
In 1949, the church began missionary activities in Hong Kong and Macao, but was unable to visit the mainland due to the Communist victory in the Chinese Civil War. The Chinese Civil War and the Korean War hampered the missionary efforts. The Hong Kong mission, with 9 missionaries and 14 Chinese converts, closed on February 6, 1951.

In 1956, missionary activities returned in Hong Kong and were initiated in Taiwan. Since then, the church has experienced "stable and moderate growth" in Taiwan, Hong Kong, and Macao.

==== Reform and opening up ====
In the context of the Chinese economic reforms of the 1980s, church leaders began engaging in legal and political negotiations with the Chinese state. In addresses in 1979, church president Spencer W. Kimball called on members to pray for peace and an opening to missionary work in China, while also praising elements of certain Chinese government policies on sexual morality, work ethics, honesty, self-discipline, and hygiene. During this visit, Kimball offered a rededication prayer for the land of China, seeking blessings for its people and the eventual opening of doors for the gospel. Visits between Chinese and church delegations occurred between 1980 and 1996. The church's Polynesian Cultural Center hosted several Chinese dignitaries, namely Vice Premier Geng Biao, Premier Zhao Ziyang, President Li Xiannian, and Vice President Li Lanqing. Church leaders and lawyers met with religious affairs officials and reported positively concerning the prospect of expanding into China.

Between the late 1970s and the mid-1990s, the church engaged in cultural exchange with China. Since 1979, Brigham Young University (BYU) performance groups have held tours in China to the approbation of Chinese political and business leaders. Future church president Russell M. Nelson, who was also a surgeon, was recognized as an honorary professor at Shandong Medical College in 1985. Beginning in the 1980s, BYU teachers were sent to Chinese institutions to help teach English.

After 1996, meetings became less publicized as the Chinese state sought to avoid inspiring other religious organizations to make similar demands for greater autonomy.

On August 30, 2010, the church confirmed the formation of a "relationship" that could lead to "regularizing" of its activities in China. In December 2012, Nelson reiterated that the church was not sending missionaries to China. In 2013, the church launched a website presented as being for informing Chinese converts on the restrictions they will obey once they return to China. The website confirmed that officially-approved congregations had existed in China since 2004, and reiterated the restrictions on the church's religious activities imposed by Chinese regulations.

In 2018, Chinese-American Gerrit W. Gong was called as a member of the church's Quorum of the Twelve Apostles.

==== Under Xi Jinping ====
On April 5, 2020, the church announced it would construct a temple in Shanghai to allow "Chinese members to continue to participate in ordinances of the temple" while the Hong Kong temple was undergoing renovation. In response, the Shanghai Municipal Bureau of Ethnic and Religious Affairs issued statements denying any knowledge of plans to build such a temple, indicating that it is "wishful thinking" and "not based in reality" and that foreigners are not allowed to establish places of worship in China.

In 2025, the Chinese government banned congregations throughout the country.

== By region ==
=== Mainland China ===
==== Membership ====
The church's lack of legal recognition in China prevents an official count of its members in China from being available. In 2018, researcher Matt Martinich estimated that there were at least 10,000 church members in China.

==== Religious activities ====
In Mainland China, the church holds separate church meetings for Chinese nationals and foreigners. Church members from Taiwan or Hong Kong attend meetings for foreigners unless their place of residence is on the mainland. Foreign Latter-day Saints are not allowed to proselytize to those in China, whether in person or online.

Church meetings are held, depending on the circumstances, in rented locations or members' homes. With the explicit or implicit consent of local or national authorities, local branches possess religious materials for worship activities that may not be distributed to outsiders.

Although foreign church members may not proselytize in China, the church is able to gain believers in China by having Chinese nationals convert while they are overseas, including by sending Mandarin-speaking missionaries to Western cities with a large Chinese population. Chinese converts are permitted to try to convert family members, and friends of converts may ask them about their faith. Those who are converted while in China must travel outside of mainland China to be baptized. These constrained modalities of proselytism have contributed to the creation of a small group of members that are generally well-educated and well-off.

==== Secular activities ====
Organizations linked to the church conduct secular activities in and relating to China. According to sociologist Pierre Vendassi, these secular activities have the effect or intent of promoting a positive image and contributing marginally to the spread of the religion, and convincing the government of the organizations social usefulness.

BYU has sent performance troupes and English teachers to China. BYU English teachers have taught at high-ranking Chinese universities, including Tsinghua University, Renmin University, Fudan University, and Jiaotong University, with more than 1,200 students per year encountering teachers that are members. Universities linked to the church offer academic exchange programs for Chinese students.

Latter-day Saint Charities work with local groups to engage in humanitarian, social, and educational efforts in low-development regions. Legal NGOs linked to the church advise governmental and legal leaders on the rule of law.

The secular activities of church-linked organizations in China are separate from the church's religious activities.

==== Legal status ====
The church is not officially recognized by the national government in mainland China, and operates under restrictions on fellowshipping and proselytism. Sociologist Pierre Vendassi states that the church has achieved a "precarious, but no less real, status of recognition" in practice.

According to Vendassi, the legal tolerance of the church by mainland Chinese authorities is atypical of religious movements based outside of China and can be attributed to the church's practice of engaging in quasi-diplomatic dialogue with governmental authorities and strictly following regulations on religion. Vendassi identifies a "red church" strategy in the church's actions, coming to the conclusion the church appears to be seeking to become an officially sanctioned religion in mainland China.

Scholar Kim-Kwong Chan describes a "dilemma" that the Chinese government faces with regard to the church's legal status: recognizing the church would "open the floodgates to other world religions" seeking official status. Chan also states that China's regulations on religion have created an "embarrassing situation" in which the church lacks official status despite "influential business investors" in China like Bill Marriott being members of the church.

==== Society ====
Sociologist Pierre Vendassi observed that, compared to members of Evangelical communities in China, the church's adherents in China tend to more greatly limit the visibility of their religious identity. According to Vendassi, interviews indicate that some Latter-day Saints in China are concerned that displaying their religious identity too prominently would carry a "political and social risk", citing one member who expressed to Vendassi in an interview that revealing his religious identity would cause others to "think that it's an American church." Vendassi argues that this can be linked to the church's "red church" policy, which cooperates with government regulations that have the goal of opposing "its development and its very nature".

According to writer Robert Farley, the church is benefitted by good U.S.-China relations because it relies on converting Chinese nationals while they are overseas.

=== Macau ===
The Church of Jesus Christ of Latter-day Saints in Macau
- Area: Asia
- Members: 1,595 (2025)
- Branches: 2
- FamilySearch Centers: 1

As of December 31, 2024, the church counts 1,445 members and 2 Branches in Macau. The church sees a significant flow members moving in and out of Macau causing fluctuations in membership and congregations. In 2015, Macau served as the pilot program for the Church's 2-hr Sunday meeting block schedule.

=== Hong Kong ===
As of December 31, 2025, the church counts 24,930 members, 1 temple, 1 mission, 1 district, 4 stakes, 20 wards, and 6 branches in Hong Kong.

== Temples ==
Temples in the People's Republic of China
Red = Operating
Blue = Under Construction
Yellow = Announced
Black = Closed for Renovations

The Hong Kong China Temple was built in 1996 and is located at 2 Cornwell Street, Kowloon Tong.

48. Hong Kong China Temple; Official website; News & images	
Location: Announced: Groundbreaking: Dedicated: Rededicated: Size: Style:	Kowloon Tong, Hong Kong, China; 3 October 1992 by Ezra Taft Benson; 22 January 1994 by John K. Carmack; 26 May 1996 by Gordon B. Hinckley; 19 June 2022 by Gerrit W. Gong; 51,921 sq ft (4,823.6 m^{2}) on a 0.31-acre (0.13 ha) site Hong Kong colonial, single-spire design - designed by Liang Peddle Thorpe Architects
302. Shanghai People's Republic of China Temple (Announced); Official website; News & images	
Location: Announced:	Shanghai, People's Republic of China; 5 April 2020 by Russell M. Nelson

== See also ==
- The Church of Jesus Christ of Latter-day Saints in Taiwan
- Christianity in China
- Freedom of religion in China
- Human rights in China
