= Antireligious campaigns in China =

Chinese governments since the late 19th century have discouraged and cracked down on both folk and organized religion. The Qing dynasty's 1898 edict confiscated folk religion temples that were not performing state sacrifices and turned them into schools; though these confiscations were reversed after a short time, they set a precedent for subsequent antireligious campaigns. In the Republic of China (ROC), both the Beiyang government and then the Nationalist government viewed the free exercise of "religion" as based on the Western model of institutionalized religions, and sought to eliminate folk religious practice through anti-superstition campaigns. During the Chinese Civil War, in the Yan'an Soviet, the Chinese Communist Party (CCP) implemented a campaign in 1945 to eliminate shamanic practices, especially those that it deemed unhygienic. After the 1949 proclamation of the People's Republic of China, the government sought to suppress new religious movements that had developed during the ROC era, deeming them reactionary secret societies.

The Chinese Communist Party adheres to the doctrine of state atheism and has carried out antireligious campaigns in the People's Republic of China to this end. Members of the CCP are required to be atheists. Major campaigns sought to eliminate religion during the Cultural Revolution. Red Guards destroyed religious objects, texts, temples, and premises as part of the campaign against the "Four Olds." The first nationwide antireligious campaign of the Reform and Opening Up period was the 1983 suppression of The Shouters, a new religious movement. In the mid-1990s, government discourses changed from the Mao-era characterization of such movements as "reactionary secret societies" to using the terminology of "evil cults". Beginning in 1999 during Jiang Zemin's administration, the government began a campaign to suppress Falun Gong and persecuted practitioners.

State campaigns against religion have escalated since Xi Jinping became CCP general secretary in 2012. For Christians in China, government decrees have mandated the widespread removal of crosses from churches, and in some cases, they have also mandated the destruction of houses of worship. Congregations of Mormons have been banned throughout the country and the small Kaifeng Jewish community has been suppressed. In Tibet, decrees have mandated the destruction of Tibetan Buddhist monastic centers, denied Tibetans' access to their cultural heritage, and led to ongoing persecution of high Buddhist lamas as well as Buddhist nuns and monks. In Xinjiang, the government has detained more than a million Uyghur Muslims in re-education camps, destroyed or sinicized mosques, and suppressed Islamic religious practices such as fasting during Ramadan.

== Late Qing period ==
Christianity was the religion most systemically discriminated against in China prior to the founding of the People's Republic of China. Chinese emperors were concerned about whether foreign authorities, particularly the Vatican, would gain control over Chinese Christians. Many Chinese people were concerned that Christianity would replace traditional Chinese cultural identity.

In 1898, Kang Youwei persuaded the Emperor to issue an edict confiscating folk religion temples which were not performing state sacrifices and turn them into schools. The temple confiscations were shortly reversed. The policy set a precedent for future campaigns in China.

Beginning in 1901, and more so after 1904, local officials and reform activists seized temple land and infrastructure to build schools, self-administration bureaus, barracks, police stations, post offices, and other newly mandated public buildings.

The Qing Code enacted a "Ban on Vernacular Masters and Heretical Techniques", including criminalizing spirit possession practices.

The current meaning of "religion" (Chinese: 宗教; pinyin: zongjiao) developed in Chinese discourses around 1900. In its earliest uses, it referred specifically to Christianity. It became more broadly used by intellectuals in China to describe exclusive systems of thought and practice with a congregational organization distinct from society as a whole, a viewpoint consistent with the Western post-Enlightenment view of religion. This definition of religion helped advance anti-superstition policies.

== Republic of China ==
In the Republic of China, both the Beiyang government and the Nationalist government sought the eliminate the social power of traditional Chinese religion. The 1912 provisional constitution's freedom of religious belief provision was framed on the Protestant model of religion as an organized faith and it did not protect folk religious belief or temples from being destroyed or repurposed. As academic Mayfair Mei-hui Yang writes, ROC "elites saw no contradiction between protecting freedom of belief on the one hand and eradicating superstition and destroying temples on the other." They deemed practices contrary to Western-style civilization as superstitious.

The ROC continued the Qing-era drive to convert temples into other institutions. Yuan Shikai supported the conversion of temples into public property.

Nationalist discourses in China during the 1920s became more anti-religious, and protests which were part of the Anti-Christian Movement occurred from 1922 to 1927. The Nationalists promoted secularism and enacted a series of campaigns to eliminate activities deemed superstitious.

From 1927 to 1937, the Nationalist government condemned folk religious practices as superstition and sought to eliminate these practices through anti-superstition campaigns. These campaigns targeted temples, shrines, practitioners, professions, and larger communities.

As part of its campaigns against temples, the Nationalist government issued standards for whether temples should be preserved or eliminated. Temples tied to religions that were deemed legitimate were acceptable, as were those for the worship of "former worthies" (religious figures deemed socially or nationally useful). The 1928 "Standards for retaining or abolishing gods and shrines" formally abolished all cults of gods with the exception of human heroes such as Yu the Great, Guan Yu and Confucius. Regulations for the campaigns against temples were amorphous and whether a temple's deity was deemed legitimate could be a matter a debate; implementation of the campaigns was accordingly uneven.

After 1928, the ROC campaign to against folk religion temples became more intense, particularly in north China, and increasingly emphasized the physical destruction of temples. The ROC temple conversion campaign lasted until the start of the Second Sino-Japanese War.

The Nationalist government initiated campaigns against ritual professions deemed "superstitious". It banned the professional practices of the "three aunties and six grannies": Buddhist and Daoist nuns, female fortune-tellers, female healers, female shamans, procuresses, female matchmakers, brothel madams, and midwives. In its campaign against superstition, the Nationalist government condemned men who practiced arts deemed superstitious as disreputable, deeming them "unproductive" and "useless to society." Male ritual professions condemned in this way included shamans, fortune tellers, geomancers, spirit mediums, and physiognomists, among others.Such practitioners were frequently viewed by the Nationalist government as swindlers. For example, in Jiangnan, a Nationalist campaign required practitioners to change their profession within three months or be moved into a factory or workhouse.

The efficacy of the ROC's anti-superstition policies were limited as a result of its weak bureaucracy, the political divisions of the warlord era, and then the Second Sino-Japanese War. Campaigns against temples were generally more effective in the north of China (where the campaigns focused more on converting the temples to educational uses) than in the south (where they focused more on destroying the actual temple premises).

Yiguandao became the largest new religious movement of the Republic of China era, in part because of its effective use of opportunities during the war. Its founder Zhang Guangbi developed a close relationship with the Japanese and Yiguandao included officials of the Wang Jingwei government in its membership. As a result, both the Nationalists and the CCP condemned Yiguandao; at the end of the Second Sino-Japanese War, Zhang was arrested and the society was banned. As the CCP came into power, some networks of Yiguandao engaged in armed conflict with it.

== CCP-controlled areas and the early PRC ==
The CCP's first mass campaign against superstition occurred in Yan'an in 1944 and 1945. The campaign sought to eliminate shamanic ritual practices, reform shamans into productive workers, and to promote public health and hygiene.

In 1949, the CCP denounced religions as being associated with "foreign cultural imperialism," "feudalism," and "superstition." After its founding, the PRC began a campaign to suppress the new religious movements that had developed during the ROC era, deeming them reactionary secret societies (fandong huidaomen). These efforts eliminated new religious movements from public practice.

In the 1950s, "combat superstition teams" visited rural areas in an effort to promote science and to reform thinking deemed as superstitious.

During the Korean War, the United States froze all Chinese assets in the United States and banned the transfer of funds from the United States to within the PRC. Among the effects of these policies was cutting off funding for American-affiliated cultural institutions in China, including Christian colleges and religious institutions. The PRC responded by nationalizing American-affiliated cultural institutions, including religious ones.

Various campaigns from the 1950s to the 1970s sought to eliminate the influence of folk religion, including through exhibition of objects deemed superstitious and publishing confessions from spirit mediums. These campaigns aimed to expose what the state deemed to be evil and ignorant superstitious practices.

As a result of antireligious campaigns which were waged between 1950 and 1979, churches, mosques, and temples were closed and re-education was imposed upon clergy.

== Cultural Revolution ==
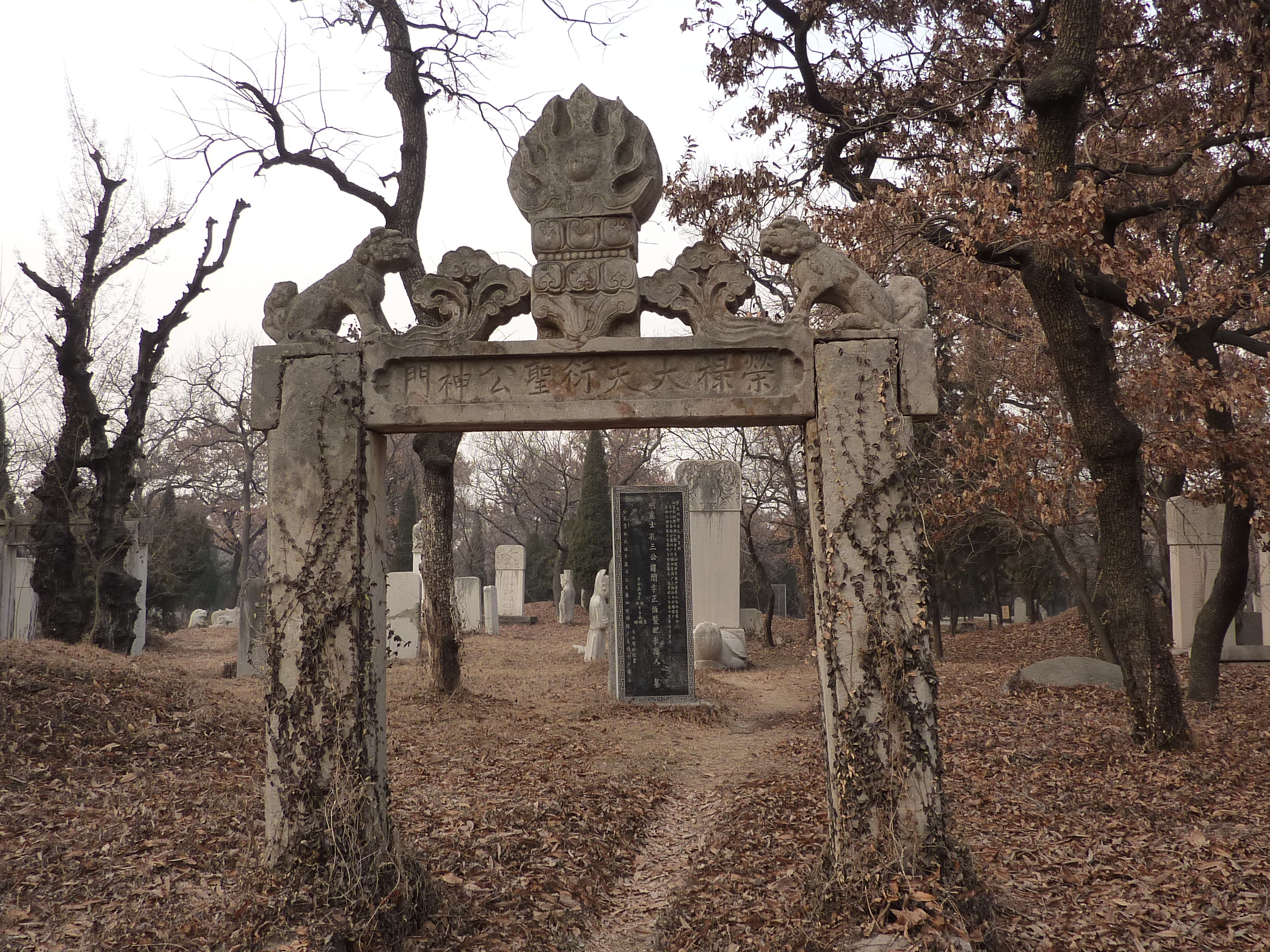
The Cemetery of Confucius was attacked by Red Guards in November 1966.

During the Cultural Revolution, religious repression intensified at both the grassroots and state level in China. In August 1966, Chairman Mao Zedong launched the Four Olds campaign. Its aim was to eliminate old thought, culture, customs, and habits and to establish a new revolutionary culture. Red Guards, mobilized by Mao and facilitated by the government, undertook the mass destruction of cultural and religious relics, texts, and places of worship.

State atheism and public religious repression were longstanding practices of the Chinese Communist Party (CCP) since their victory in 1949. However, with the onset of the Cultural Revolution, a nationwide ban on both public and private religious practice was enacted, including household altars, prayer, and the study of religious texts. During this period, especially during the Four Olds campaign, the CCP and Red Guards enforced this ban. They “shut down” or “destroyed” places of worship, including temples, mosques, and churches, burned “sacred” books, and “smashed” artifacts. The CCP criminalized the possession of religious artifacts or texts. It is estimated that before the Chinese Communist Party came to power, there were more than 20,000 mosques in Xinjiang. The number declined to fewer than 500 during the Cultural Revolution.

All religions in China were attacked in this manner, including Confucianism, folk worship, Buddhism, Islam, Christianity, and indigenous religions of ethnic minorities. Historian Merle Goldman assessed that while “organized religion was destroyed” by the Cultural Revolution's campaigns, “the religion could not be.” Many people maintained their religious beliefs and practices in secret.

Confucianism was a major target of the Four Olds campaign, as it is deeply entwined with Chinese culture. Red Guards set out to “smash the four olds,” including texts, relics, and cultural sites, from 1966 to 1967. Beijing was a hotspot of Four Olds campaign activity: more than 4,922 of the capital's 6,843 official historical sites were destroyed or damaged in 1966.

On August 26, 1966, a group of Red Guards attempted to destroy the Confucius Temple complex in the philosopher's hometown of Qufu, Shandong Province. They were rebuffed by locals, who had formed their own mass organization to protect the site. A group of students and teachers from Beijing Normal University, led by Tan Houlan, returned in November to attack and vandalize the cemetery. They destroyed over 6,600 registered cultural artifacts, including more than 900 paintings, 2,700 books, 1,000 stone steles, and 2,000 graves. Red Guards hosted local mass rallies where they denounced Confucius and his educational philosophy.

In 1966, the municipal government of Foshan, Guangdong province, revoked protection for urban cultural sites — the Hall of Scriptures Right Monastery, Emperor Guan's Shrine-on-the-Water, the Southern Springs Right Shrine, and the Ancestral Temple of the Prince's Daughter's Husband — clearing the way for the “called-for destruction of the ‘four olds’”. According to MacFarquhar and Schoenhals, a state film crew escorted one group of Red Guards to record their “destruction of Buddhist statues and incense burners” at a monastery in Beijing's Western Hills “for posterity.”

Anti-religious action in the PRC has often been, and continues to be, closely tied to the persecution of ethnic minorities. In Tibet, religious repression was one component of the Chinese government's overarching policy of forced cultural assimilation for the region. Though many had already been destroyed by 1966, Freedom House, corroborated by Jane Ardley, reported that only eleven of the 6,200 Tibetan Buddhist monasteries survived the Cultural Revolution. Monks were beaten or killed, and many Tibetans escaped with sacred texts and compiled teachings in exile communities in India. According to Jane Ardley's analysis of the Tibetan independence movement, the majority of Tibet's estimated 600,000 monks and nuns were “dead, disappeared, or imprisoned” by 1979.

=== Shadian incident ===
In 1974 and 1975, Muslim Hui people from Yunnan led an uprising against the CCP that was put down by the People's Liberation Army (PLA) in a massacre, known as the Shadian incident. Shadian Town was home to one of the largest Hui populations in China before the massacre, with approximately 7,200 residents. Ethnoreligious conflict simmered in Yunnan in the late 1960s and early 1970s due to the prohibition of religion. Reportedly, "acts of religious coercion" were perpetrated against Muslims in the region, including individuals being "compelled…to eat pork" and incidents of "pork bones…thrown into wells" to "irretrievably pollute the drinking water." Hundreds of Muslims from Shadian protested to demand their constitutional religious freedoms and attempted to reclaim mosques closed by the PLA. Amid violence between local Muslim and county non-Muslim militias, Deng Xiaoping commanded 10,000 PLA soldiers to quell the rebellion on July 29, 1975. According to MacFarquhar and Schoenhals, the estimated death toll of the ensuing massacre was 1,600, including 300 children. Shadian Town accounted for half of the casualties.

== Deng Xiaoping era ==
In 1982, the CCP issued The Basic Viewpoint on the Religious Question during our Country’s Socialist Period, commonly known as Document 19, that repudiated certain policies of the Cultural Revolution but also asserted that "communists are atheists and must unremittingly propagate atheism." It described the Cultural Revolution's effort to suppress religion from society as "completely wrong and extremely harmful." Document No. 19 states that Marxists should be atheists and free to propagate atheism, but that they must do so without antagonizing religious believers.

In 1983, a nationwide campaign sought to suppress The Shouters. This was the first nationwide campaign of the post-Mao era targeting a religious group that the government had deemed a reactionary secret society. A "strike hard" campaign against new religious movements proceeded from 1983 to 1986 (and later in some places).

== 1989–2002: Jiang Zemin administration ==
In the mid-1990s, the Chinese state began to adopt Western anti-cult discourse and terminology, influenced by the global media coverage of groups like the Branch Davidians, Aum Shinrikyo, and the Order of the Solar Temple. It stopped using the Mao-era term "reactionary secret society" to refer to such groups, and instead began using the term "evil cult" (邪教 xiejiao) or "cultic organization". From 1995 to 1999, the Ministry of State Security, the State Council, and the Central Committee of the Chinese Communist Party designated 14 new religious movements as evil cults.

=== Falun Gong ===
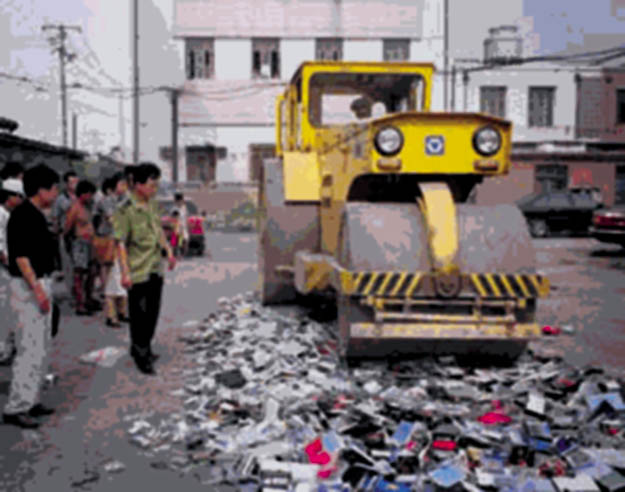
Falun Gong books are destroyed following the announcement of the ban in 1999.

On July 20, 1999, the Chinese government, led by Jiang Zemin from 1989 to 2002, commenced the persecution of Falun Gong. It called for the "education of Marxist materialism and atheism" to counter Falun Gong. People practicing in public or disseminating Falun Gong books would be jailed, according to state media.

The Washington Post reported that Jiang Zemin alone decided that Falun Gong must be eliminated. Human Rights Watch observed that the persecution against Falun Gong reflects the CCP's belief that "religion is inherently subversive, a vehicle for foreign and domestic anti-China forces."

In December 1999, four high-profile Falun Gong practitioners were sentenced to between 16 and 18 years in prison. On October 1, 2000, foreign media correspondents witnessed police beating and arresting thousands of Falun Gong practitioners on the Tiananmen Square in Beijing who were protesting against the persecution. An April 2000 Wall Street Journal article described how the Chinese government tortured a 58-year-old woman who refused to renounce her faith in Falun Gong and died in police custody.

According to reports, Falun Gong practitioners have been subjected to medical testing and had their organs forcibly removed since 1999. Another report highlighted that the rapid expansion of the organ transplant industry in China coincided with Jiang's launch of the persecution against Falun Gong in 1999. It referenced accounts from Falun Gong practitioners who underwent medical testing consistent with the requirements for organ transplants.

=== Tibetan Buddhists ===
In 1989, violent repression spread in Tibet after prolonged rebellions against Chinese rule. Under the local authority of Hu Jintao, then the CCP Secretary of Tibet, possibly hundreds of Tibetans were killed. Martial Law was declared for a year, until 30 April 1990, during which hundreds more were killed and thousands imprisoned under Jiang's Beijing authority and Hu's local authority. Hu was later promoted to top leadership posts for his work.

In 1991, while crafting policy towards Tibetan Buddhists, Jiang's preliminary decree stated reincarnated lamas must be approved by China's central government. The decree was later revised and termed State Religious Affairs Bureau Order No. 5 in 2007, during the administration of Hu Jintao.

In 1992, Jiang's government formally accepted the 14th Dalai Lama's official recognition and the enthronement of Orgyen Trinley Dorje as the reincarnated 17th Gyalwang Karmapa, spiritual leader of the Karma Kagyu school. The recognition process was led by the 3rd Jamgon Kongtrul, who died in a mysterious car crash earlier in 1992. The Karmapa, along with the Dalai Lama and the Panchen Lama, is highly respected by Tibetans and considered to be living Buddhas. By 1999, the Karmapa escaped to India and pointed to interference by the Chinese government in his spiritual leadership and studies as his motive.

Also in 1992, 13 monks from Drepung Monastery were arrested on 12 May for protesting peacefully. Samdup was jailed for seven years, and in 2020, became the fourth former political prisoner to die from medical complications within the previous six months.

In 1994, a Chinese policy called "grasping with both hands" was implemented in Tibet, targeting Tibetan Buddhism and culture. It was credited with leading to the 2008 Tibetan unrest.

On May 17, 1995, Jiang's government officially reversed its acceptance policy of recognized re-incarnated lamas and of Tibetan Buddhist spiritual leaders, and abducted Gedhun Choekyi Nyima, the 11th Panchen Lama, three days after his official recognition by the Dalai Lama. Chadrel Rinpoche and two others involved in the recognition process were also disappeared, then imprisoned. Months later, in November, Jiang's government installed its proxy Panchen Lama, Gyaltsen Norbu. The recognized 11th Panchen Lama, Gedhun Choekyi Nyima, continues to be forcibly detained in an unknown location.

In 1996, Jiang's administration officially banned all photographs of Tibet's spiritual leader, the 14th Dalai Lama.

By March 1998, the Central Tibetan Administration reported the Dalai Lama statement that Chinese campaigns of repression had spread beyond monasteries and nunneries, and that Jiang was undertaking "a deliberate policy of cultural genocide in Tibet".

In 2001, the Chinese government began persecuting and forcibly evicting nuns and monks studying at Larung Gar Buddhist Academy and Yarchen Gar in Tibet.

=== Christians ===
According to Human Rights Watch, Christians who met in private homes, including those involved in underground churches and house churches, and did not register with the authorities, were repeatedly detained, fined, or harassed by the police. On January 27, 1994, Huang Fangxin was arrested and labeled a "ringleader of an illegal religious organization" due to his involvement in "illegal religious" activities, which included organizing a gospel team.

Harsher punishments, including lengthy imprisonment terms, were imposed on those identified by the authorities as leaders of "illegal" religious groups. In 1996, it was reported that some Christians in Zhoukou, Henan Province, were so frightened that they dared not stay in their homes. Instead, they had to sleep and worship in the fields.

In August 2000, the authorities arrested 130 members of an underground Christian church in central China. According to reports, the family church group had 500,000 members and refused to register with the authorities. The founder of the church, Zhang Rongliang, was charged of leading a "cult" and sentenced to two years in forced labor camp in December 2000.

In November–December 2000, the authorities destroyed, closed, or confiscated about 400 unregistered Protestant and Catholic church buildings in Wenzhou, Zhejiang Province, alone, as a part of the most destructive campaign since the late 1970s.

=== Muslims ===
On May 18, 1996, state media Xinjiang Daily under Jiang's administration, published a commentary on the government policy, stating "Freedom of religious belief is not freedom for religion." According to Ethan Gutmann, a China analyst and human-rights investigator, the Chinese government began harvesting organs from members of the predominantly Muslim Uyghur ethnic minority group in the 1990s. "Each year, about 25,000-50,000 captive Uyghurs go missing," wrote Gutmann. Other reports also concluded the targeted populations of state-sanctioned organ harvest include Uyghurs in Xinjiang in addition to Falun Gong.

== 2002–2012: Hu Jintao administration ==
Under the Hu–Wen Administration from 2002 to 2012, land redevelopment was used as a form of religious persecution, while the demolition of spiritually sacred buildings and sites was undertaken.

=== Falun Gong ===
In June 2005, Gao Rongrong, a 37-year-old accountant from Liaoning Province, died in custody after two years at the Longshan Forced Labor Camp. According to Amnesty International, she had been tortured with electric shocks to her face and neck, resulting in severe burns.

In January 2008, police detained musician Yu Zhou and his wife after finding CDs and printed materials about Falun Gong in their car. Zhou was taken into custody and died 10 days later. His wife was sentenced to three years in a forced labor camp.

Human Rights Watch reported in 2005 that Falun Gong practitioners constituted the majority of detainees in the camps examined and endured the "longest sentences and worst treatment." "The government's campaign against the group has been so thorough that even long-time Chinese activists are afraid to say the group's name aloud," according to the report.

=== Tibetan Buddhists ===
In 2006, Tibetans were arrested after responding to calls from the Dalai Lama to burn animal skin clothing. Bonfires spread throughout Tibet as a form of defiance.

On 13 July 2007, the State Religious Affairs Bureau Order No. 5 was passed, requiring reincarnated lamas and religious institutions in Tibet to apply for permission with state bureaus so as to be considered legal.

The persecution of Tibetan Buddhists escalated under Hu Jintao, leading to the 2008 Tibetan unrest. The uprising is described as the biggest challenge to China's invasion since 1959. As unrest over Chinese persecution grew, waves of protests began, including street demonstrations, which were met with excessive force.

A farming boycott began in 2009 in protest for those people detained or "disappeared" into the CCP's custody. Civil disobedience became widespread, as all the monks in a Jomda, Chamdo province monastery deserted in June 2009 instead of participating in "patriotic education".

Acts of self-immolation began in 2009 at Kirti Monastery. In 2010, two Tibetan laypeople were killed while trying to stop a mass arrest of approximately 300 monks at Kirti Monastery.

In 2011, China's foreign ministry announced only Beijing could appoint the 15th Dalai Lama. A monk at Nyitso monastery, Tsewang Norbu, self-immolated after chanting "Long live the Dalai Lama" and "Tibetan people want freedom". The non-profit organization Free Tibet said telephone and internet services were subsequently cut to keep the news from spreading, and the monastery's utilities had been repeatedly cut. Author Tsering Woeser said that Chinese security forces surrounded the monastery on the same night of Tsewang Norbu's death.

== 2012–present: Xi Jinping administration ==
The Chinese government and the Chinese Communist Party, led by Xi Jinping from 2012 to the present, intensified antireligious campaigns in the country. In 2016, Xi called for "improved religious work" by uniting religious and non-religious people, and emphasizing that members of the Chinese Communist Party must act as "unyielding Marxist atheists".

In September 2019, the UN Human Rights Council was told by the China Tribunal that the Government of China "is harvesting and selling organs from persecuted religious and ethnic minorities on an industrial scale". The tribunal concluded that religious and ethnic minorities are being "killed to order... cut open while still alive for their kidneys, livers, hearts, lungs, cornea, and skin to be removed and turned into commodities for sale".

=== New religious movements ===
Although Xi Jinping abolished the "reeducation through labor" system in 2013, Amnesty International reported that Falun Gong practitioners are among those particularly at risk of torture. Scholar André Laliberté argues that the CCP continues to target Falun Gong for repression because it perceives the movement as a challenge to its authority. Reports express concerns that the CCP subjects Falun Gong practitioners and ethnic Uyghurs to organ harvesting.

In 2014, proselytizing members of a new religious movement murdered a woman named Wu Shuoyan at a McDonald's restaurant in Zhaoyuan when she refused to provide them her phone number. Different views of the murderers' affiliations exist: they were either members of Eastern Lightning (itself an offshoot of The Shouters), or a further offshoot of Eastern Lightning. The murder prompted a wave of government campaigns to crack down on what the state deems as "evil cults". Eastern Lightning's mode of expansion is to proselytize among independent Protestant congregations (commonly termed house churches), and many leaders among these Protestant communities have criticized Eastern Lightning and assisted the state's efforts.

=== Tibetan Buddhists ===
According to a report by the Tibetan Centre for Human Rights and Democracy, under Xi Jinping, the widespread targeting of Tibetans and Tibetan Buddhist monasteries, together with the persecution of ordained Khenpos, nuns, and monks, escalated. Han Chinese settling in Tibet also continues.

Massive redevelopment projects, including railways, mines, roadways, dams, and shopping centers forcibly displace Tibetans and erode the environment. From 2015 to the present, farmlands and ancestral nomadic grazing lands are also being confiscated from Tibetans.

Reports state that administrators of monasteries have been replaced by police or by people considered government infiltrators, while military surveillance units have been installed at Kirti Monastery, Yarchen Gar, Shak Rongpo Gaden Dargyeling Monastery, and at other monasteries, along with CCTV cameras. Drongna Monastery was forcibly closed in 2013, and its chant master Thardhod Gyaltsen received an 18-year prison sentence in 2014 for possession of a picture and recording of the 14th Dalai Lama.

Some also express concerns that construction and tourism are eroding Tibetan culture. By 2020, after Chinese state-sponsored tourist agencies funneled people from inner China to Lhasa, reports stated that the tourists disrupted ceremonies, were disrespectful to Tibetan customs, and threw trash around sacred sites. Police support the tourists confronted by complaints.

Reports also indicate tourism is used to disrupt monastic life within Buddhist monasteries. Monastic residences of nuns and monks were demolished before mass evictions began in 2016 at Larung Gar, in 2019 at Yarchen Gar, in 2013 at Jhada Gon Palden Khachoe Nunnery, and elsewhere. For Yarchen Gar alone, almost six thousand monks and nuns were evicted from their homes. Between 2017 and 2018, at least 4,820 Tibetan and Han Chinese monks and nuns were removed from Larung Gar, and over 7,000 dwellings and other structures were demolished, which began in 2001. Tourist accommodations and roads replaced the residences, or are planned for the sites where residences were demolished. Other monasteries are partially renovated for tourist accommodations, whose proximity disrupts daily life.

After the mass evictions, nuns and monks were bused away, and reportedly detained in re-education camps. Among others, an identified re-education center is named Ningtri. Reports include beatings and the torture of monastics and laypeople at re-education camps, and in jails after arrests.

In 2016, the CCP commenced a campaign to sinicize religion, which intensified after 2018. The sinicization of Tibet was condemned by the Dalai Lama as cultural cleansing.

The ethnic cleansing policies in Tibet were managed by hardliner Chen Quanguo, before his 2016 transfer to govern Xinjiang. A United States Department of State report in 2019 documented incidents of sexual abuse, rape, and gender-based violence at the Chinese detention centers.

In April 2019, the Chinese police-enforced ban against photographs of the Dalai Lama spread to remote areas of Tibet.

Under Xi Jinping's authority, the CCP's cultural and political "Sinicization" policies have been implemented in schools to indoctrinate Tibetan children with the CCP's ideology. According to United Nations Special Rapporteurs in 2023, Tibetan children are forced to complete a compulsory education curriculum in Mandarin Chinese as part of the CCP's policy of forced assimilation. Radio Free Asia reported that, in early 2024, the CCP intensified efforts to enforce a ban by going door-to-door to prevent Tibetan children from taking private classes and participating in religious activities during school breaks.

=== Christians ===
The persecution of members of other spiritual organizations is also continuing under Xi Jinping. Journalist Ian Johnson noted that officials have targeted Christianity, and Islam, with particular intensity because of their perceived foreign ties. In the Chinese province of Zhejiang alone, over 1200 Christian crosses have been removed from their steeples since 2013.

During August 2017 in Shanxi province, several Catholic priests and supporters were injured while blocking a state-owned bulldozer from razing a former factory building granted to the Church as compensation for a property lost in 1992. Local authorities unanimously decided the condition of the property met the criteria for demolition, as required by the city's planned transportation network project. However, the diocese complained they were denied an opportunity to negotiate, and were given no assurance of fair compensation. In February 2018, government authorities in Kashgar, "launched an anti-religion propaganda drive through local police stations", which included policemen erecting a banner proclaiming, "We Must Solemnly Reject Religion, Must Not Believe in Religion".

In December 2018, Chinese authorities raided Christian house churches just before Christmas, compelling their owners to close them. Christmas trees and Santa Clauses were also removed. In 2018, the United Front Work Department initiated a crackdown on large outdoor religious statues.

The government of China continued to persecute Christians during the 2019 COVID-19 pandemic, demolishing the Xiangbaishu Church in Yixing and removing a Christian Cross from the steeple of a church in Guiyang County. In Shandong Province, "officials issued guidance forbidding online preaching, a vital way for churches to reach congregants amid both persecution and the spread of the virus".

In 2020, the Chinese government put additional regulations in place to restrict religious education and proselytizing. It issued new regulations in September 2025, limiting religious activity online to channels registered with the authorities. In October 2025, the Chinese government arrested dozens of Zion Church members in Beijing, Shanghai, Shenzhen, and other cities.

=== Muslims ===
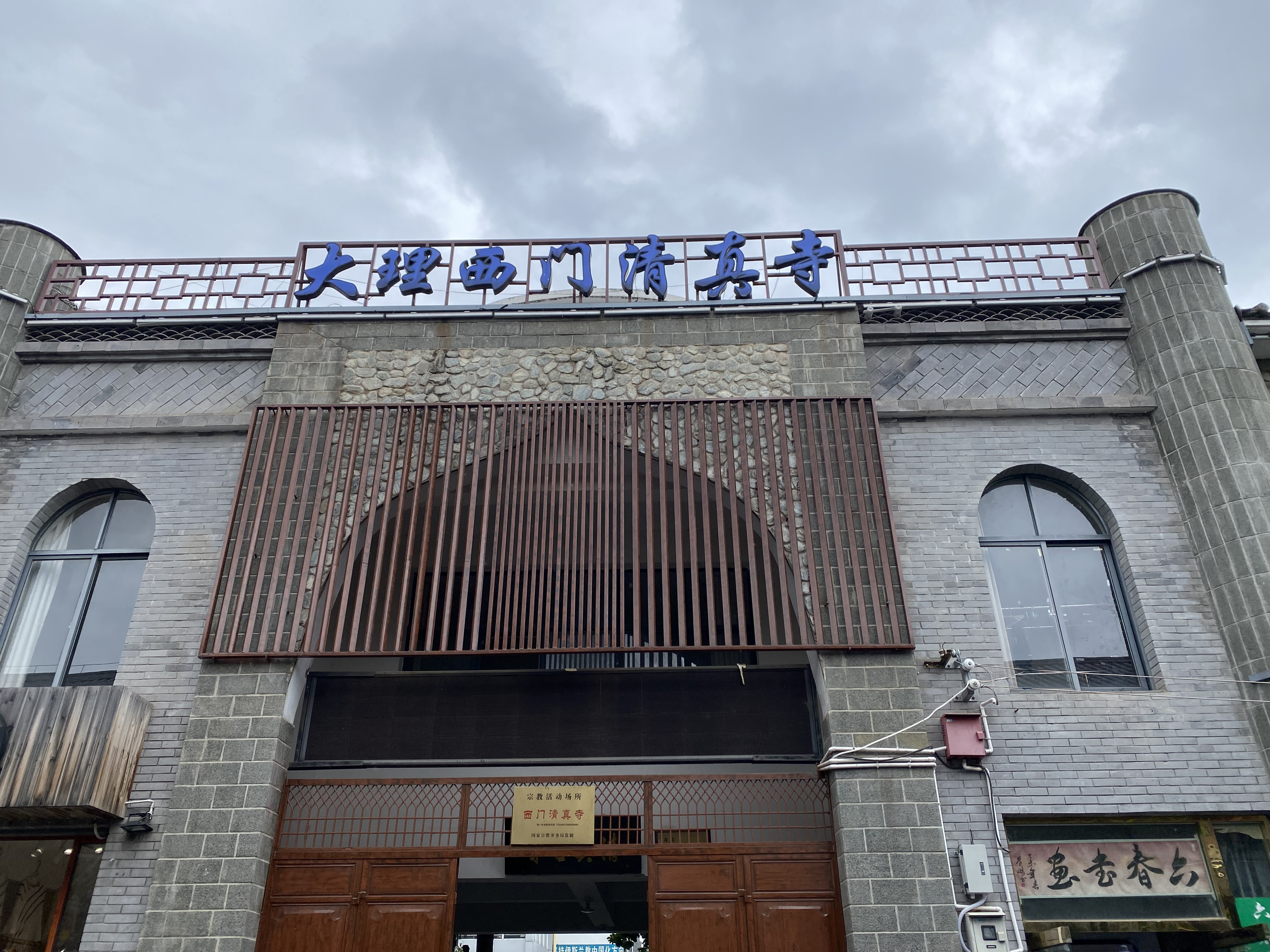
Mosque with dome removed due to Sinicization policy

In 2017, the Chinese government officially prohibited Muslims in Xinjiang from naming their babies "Muhammad" among other Islamic names. By November 2018, the Chinese government had detained over one million Uyghurs in re-education camps as part of a thought reform campaign, "where Uyghur Muslims are remade into atheist Chinese subjects" and subjected to forced labor. For children forcibly taken away from their parents, the Chinese government has established kindergartens with the aim of combating 'three evil forces' (separatism, extremism, and terrorism), and "converting future generations of Uyghur Muslim children into loyal subjects who embrace atheism". According to estimates from the Australian Strategic Policy Institute, under Xi Jinping, thousands of mosques and Muslim religious sites were damaged or destroyed in China. The Chinese government has intensified its repression by using artificial intelligence facial recognition cameras against the Uyghurs, both outside and inside places of worship. Government campaigns against Islam have extended to the Hui people and Utsul community in Hainan.

Chinese officials denied the use of re-education camps, but said Uyghurs have been placed in "vocational training centers" to curb extremism and boost employability. Muslim prisoners in detention centers and re-education camps have faced practices such as being force-fed pork. Prohibitions on fasting during Ramadan are couched in terms of protecting residents' free will.

In November 2019, the re-education camps were described in the leaked Xinjiang papers. A 2020 Associated Press investigation found that in an effort to reduce the Muslim population, the state subjects minority women to pregnancy checks and imposes intrauterine devices (IUDs), sterilization, and abortion on hundreds of thousands. While the use of IUDs and sterilization had declined in China, it had sharply increased in Xinjiang. The United States Commission on International Religious Freedom (USCIRF) cautioned that China's oppressive population control policies targeting Uyghurs and other Muslim groups—including forced sterilization—could legally constitute genocide under international law.

=== Jews ===
The Kaifeng Jewish community has reported increasing suppression by the authorities since 2015, this campaign of repression has resulted in a reversal of the modest revival which the Kaifeng Jewish community experienced in the 1990s. The public performance of religious services and the celebration of religious festivals like Passover and Sukkot have been prohibited, and Jewish community groups have been shut down.

=== Mormons ===
In 2025, the Chinese government banned congregations of The Church of Jesus Christ of Latter-day Saints in China throughout the country.

== Responses in the United States ==
On September 4, 2000, the U.S. Commission on International Religious Freedom issued a release stating the "already deplorable" China's record on religious freedom had "further deteriorated," citing "reliable press reports" of religious repression against Falun Gong, Zhong Gong, Uighur Muslims, Protestant and Roman Catholic Christians and Tibet Buddhists.

On July 24, 2002, U.S. House of Representatives passed a unanimous resolution (House Concurrent Resolution 188) condemning the persecution of Falun Gong in China.

In June 2020, the Uyghur Human Rights Policy Act was signed into law in the United States in response to the re-education camps in Xinjiang. In December 2021, the Uyghur Forced Labor Prevention Act became law to ensure that American entities do not fund forced labor in Xinjiang. The law presumes that all goods originating from Xinjiang, where Beijing has established internment camps, are produced using forced labor.

In December 2020, the Tibet Policy and Support Act became law in the United States in support of Tibetan Buddhists' right to determine Dalai Lama succession.

In March 2023, the U.S. House of Representatives passed the Stop Forced Organ Harvesting Act of 2023, which would impose sanctions and penalties on individuals involved in state-sanctioned forced organ harvesting, particularly targeting the Falun Gong and Uyghur communities.

In May 2023, U.S. Senators Marco Rubio and Jeff Merkley introduced the Uyghur Genocide Accountability and Sanctions Act (UGSA) to hold the CCP accountable for human rights abuses against Uyghurs and other Turkic minorities in Xinjiang. In April 2024, the U.S. Congressional Uyghur Caucus introduced the House's version of the UGASA.

In June 2024, the U.S. House of Representatives passed the Falun Gong Protection Act, which seeks to impose sanctions on anyone involved in involuntary organ harvesting, with an emphasis on those targeting Falun Gong members.

== See also ==
- Human rights in China
- Freedom of religion in China
- Persecution of Falun Gong
- Transnational repression by China
- Four Buddhist Persecutions in China
