= Islamic Association of China =

Religious organization based in Beijing, China

- 中国伊斯兰教协会
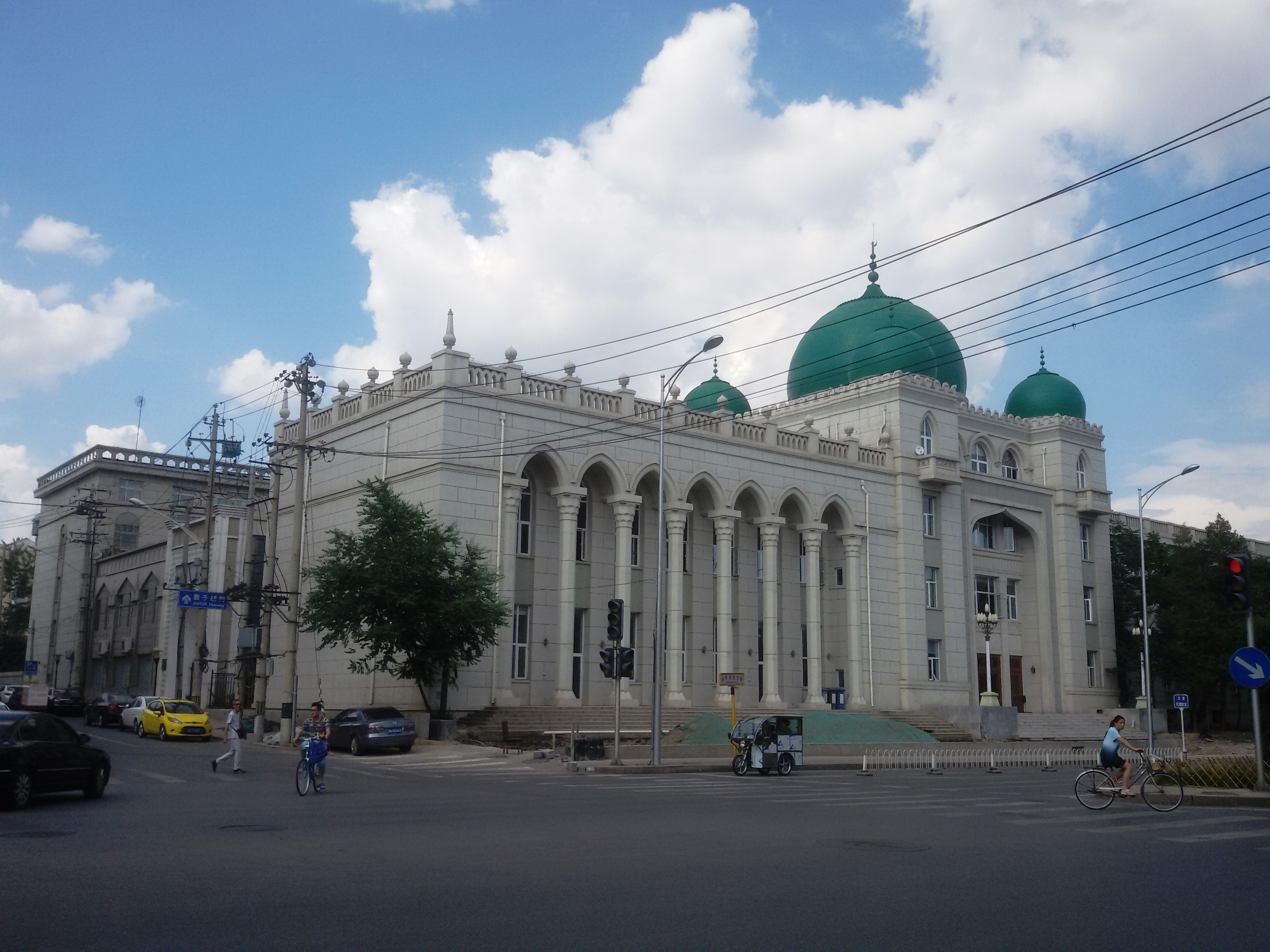
- Headquarters of the Islamic Association of China
- Formation: 1953; 73 years ago
- Headquarters: Beijing
- Parent organization: United Front Work Department of the Central Committee of the Chinese Communist Party
- Website: www.chinaislam.net.cn

The Islamic Association of China (simplified Chinese: 中国伊斯兰教协会; traditional Chinese: 中國伊斯蘭教協會; pinyin: Zhōngguó Yīsīlánjiào Xiéhuì; Uyghur: جۇڭگو ئىسلام دىنى جەمئىيىتى) is the official government supervisory organ for Islam in the People's Republic of China. The association is controlled by the United Front Work Department of the Central Committee of the Chinese Communist Party (CCP) following the State Administration for Religious Affairs' absorption into the United Front Work Department in 2018.

In international relations, the Islamic Association of China is a major official interlocutor for China with the Organization of Islamic Cooperation.

== History ==
In July 1952, Muslim leaders Burhan Shahidi, Liu Geping, Saifuddin Azizi, Yang Jingren, Pu-sheng, Ma Jian, Pang Shiqian and Ma Yuhuai met in Beijing to discuss founding a Chinese Islamic association. The Islamic Association of China was established on May 11, 1953, as the first unified national Islamic organization, designed to build bridges between all Chinese Muslims. At its inaugural meeting on May 11, 1953, in Beijing, representatives from 10 nationalities of the People's Republic of China were in attendance. Since its founding, there have been eight national conferences.

In 1955, the association established an Islamic college at Beijing that trains students to become religious professionals. In 1957, the Association began publishing a bi-monthly magazine targeted at Chinese Muslims. During the Cultural Revolution, the actives of the Association ceased but began again in 1979.

In 1980, the CCP Central Committee approved a request by the United Front Work Department to create a national conference for religious groups. The Islamic Association of China was one of five such religious groups, which also included the Catholic Patriotic Association, the Chinese Taoist Association, the Three-Self Patriotic Movement, and the Buddhist Association of China.

In 2018, the association's parent organization, the State Administration for Religious Affairs, was absorbed into the CCP's United Front Work Department.

In 2025, shortly prior to Ramadan, the Islamic Association of China changed its official logo, removing imagery of a mosque topped by a crescent moon.

== Leaders ==
The incumbent president is Xilalunding Chen Guangyuan, and the vice-president is Juma Taier.

== See also ==
- Islam in China (1912–present)
- Islamophobia in China
- Islamic socialism
