= Chinese Taoist Association =

State-sanctioned religious organization in China

- 中国道教协会
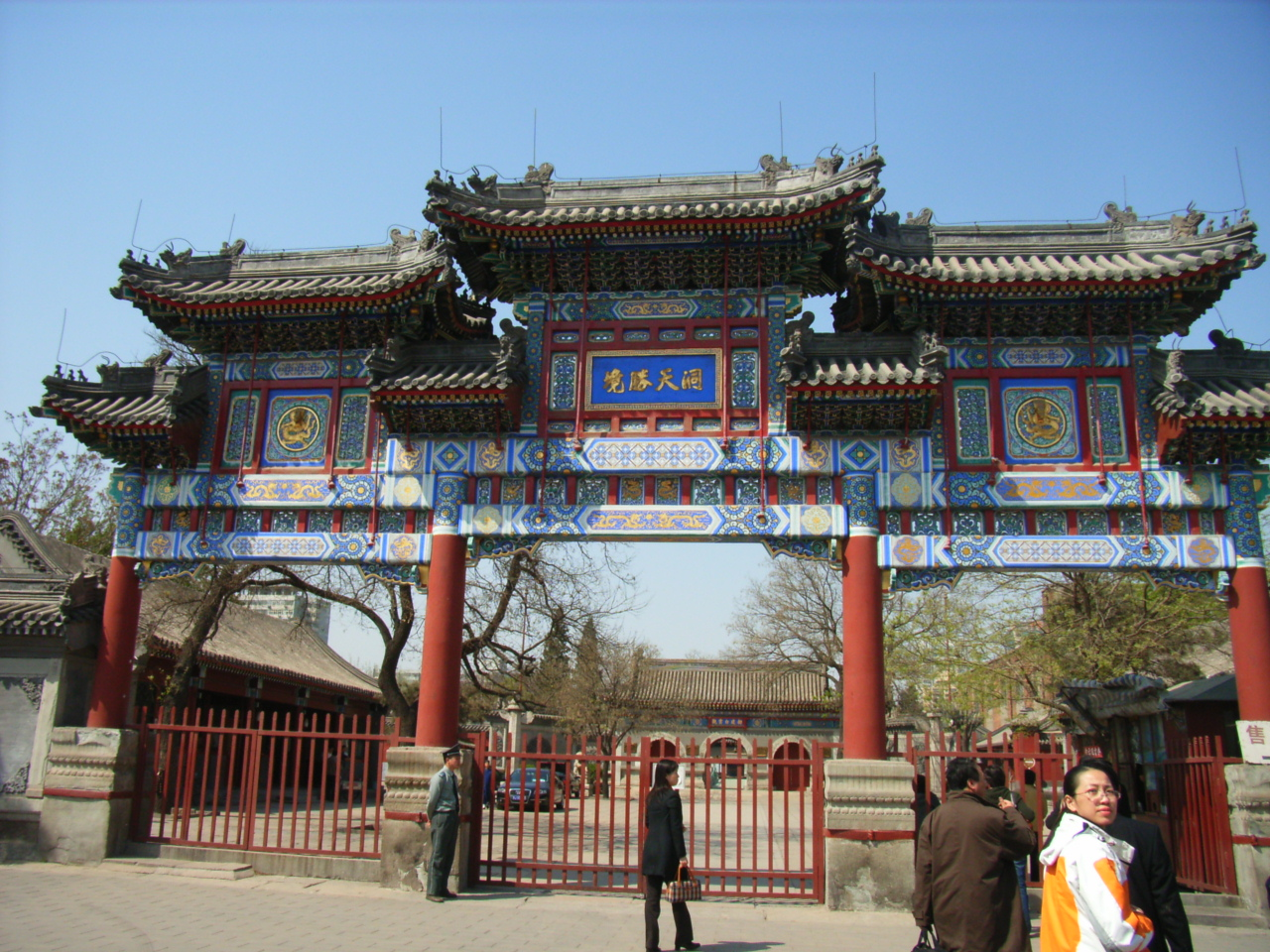
- Chinese Taoist Association headquarters at the White Cloud Temple
- Formation: 1957; 69 years ago
- Headquarters: White Cloud Temple, 9 Baiyunguan Street, Xicheng District, Beijing
- Parent organization: United Front Work Department of the Central Committee of the Chinese Communist Party
- Website: www.taoist.org.cn

Chinese Taoist Association (CTA; Chinese: 中国道教协会), founded in April 1957, is the official government supervisory organ of Taoism in the People's Republic of China.

== History ==
In 1980, the Central Committee of the Chinese Communist Party approved a request by the United Front Work Department to create a national conference for religious groups. The Chinese Taoist Association was one of five such religious groups, which also included the Islamic Association of China, the Catholic Patriotic Association, the Three-Self Patriotic Movement, and the Buddhist Association of China.

It is overseen by the United Front Work Department since the State Administration for Religious Affairs' absorption in the UFWD in 2018. Dozens of regional and local Taoist associations are included in this overarching group, which is encouraged by the government to be a bridge between Chinese Taoists and the government, to encourage a "patriotic merger" between Taoism and government initiatives.

The group disseminates information on traditional Taoist topics, including forums and conferences. The association was a major sponsor of the 2007 International Forum on the Tao Te Ching. The Chinese Taoist Association advocates for the re-compensation of losses inflicted on Taoism by the Cultural Revolution. Taoism was banned for several years in the People's Republic of China during that period.

Taoist practitioners in China are required to register with the Chinese Taoist Association in order to be granted recognition and official protection. The CTA exercises control over religious doctrine and personnel, and dictates the proper interpretation of Taoist doctrine. It also encourages Taoist practitioners to support the Communist Party and the state. For example, a Taoist scripture reading class held by the CTA in November 2010 required participants to "fervently love the socialist motherland [and] uphold the leadership of the Chinese Communist Party." The central government of China has supported and encouraged the Association, along with other official religious groups, in promoting the "harmonious society" initiative of CCP General Secretary Hu Jintao.

In February 2023, the CTA launched a searchable database of official practitioners.
