= Li Yang =

Li Yang or Yang Li may refer to:

== People surnamed Li ==
- Li Yang (director) (born 1959), Chinese film director
- Li Yang (educator) (born 1969), Chinese educator and founder of Crazy English
- Yang Li (fashion designer) (born 1987), UK-based fashion designer

=== Sportspeople ===
- Li Yang (rower) (born 1978), Chinese Olympic rower
- Li Yang (ski jumper) (born 1980), Chinese ski jumper
- Li Yang (boxer) (born 1982), Chinese amateur featherweight boxer
- Li Yang (sport shooter) (born 1985), Chinese sports shooter
- Lee Yang (born 1995), Taiwanese badminton player
- Li Yang, former name of Geng Xiaoshun (born 1990), Chinese footballer
- Li Yang (footballer, born 1997), Chinese male footballer
- Li Yang (footballer, born 1999), Chinese male footballer
- Li Yang (judoka) (born 1993), Chinese judoka

== People surnamed Yang ==
- Li Yang (biologist), American biologist
- Li "Cindy" Yang (born c. 1973), Chinese-American massage parlor owner and Trump fundraiser
- Yang Li (stand-up comedian) (born 1992), Chinese comedian
- Yang Li (footballer) (born 1993), Chinese female footballer
- Yang Li (activist), Chinese human rights activist

== See also ==
- Liyang (disambiguation), for a list of places
- 16164 Yangli, minor planet
