= Zhang Lebin =

Chinese politician

- 张乐斌

Deputy Director of the State Administration for Religious Affairs
- In office May 2010 – September 2015 Serving with Jiang Jianyong and Chen Zongrong
- Preceded by: Director
- Succeeded by: Wang Zuo'an

Personal details
- Born: April 1958 (age 68) Bo'ai County, Henan, China
- Party: Chinese Communist Party (1983–2016; expelled)
- Education: Xinxiang Normal College; Central Party School of the Chinese Communist Party; Central China Normal University

Chinese name
- Traditional Chinese: 張樂斌
- Simplified Chinese: 张乐斌
Transcriptions
Standard Mandarin
- Hanyu Pinyin: Zhāng Lèbīn

Zhang Lebin (born April 1958) is a former Chinese politician who spent most of his career in Communist Youth League of China Central Committee. He previously served as deputy director of the State Administration for Religious Affairs. As of September 2015 he was under investigation by the Communist Party's anti-corruption agency.

== Life and career ==
Born in Bo'ai County, Henan in April 1958, he graduated from Xinxiang Normal College in July 1982.

He became involved in politics in August 1977, and joined the Chinese Communist Party in December 1983.

In August 1977 he was a worker in Tractor Station in his hometown, and soon taught school.

In July 1984 he was promoted to become his hometown's party secretary of the Communist Youth League, a position he held until December 1987. Then he was transferred to the Communist Youth League of China Central Committee and over a period of 13 years worked his way up to the position of deputy director of the State Administration for Religious Affairs.

On September 22, 2015, the CCP Central Commission for Discipline and Inspection announced that he has come under investigation for "serious violation of discipline." He was expelled from the party on January 5, 2016.
