= Religious policy of Xi Jinping =

Religious sinicization (from "sinicize", meaning somebody or something modified under Chinese influence) usually refers to "the indigenisation of religious faith, practice, and ritual in Chinese culture and society". Since Xi Jinping took office as the General Secretary of the Chinese Communist Party in 2012, the officially atheist Chinese Communist Party (CCP) has tightened restrictions on religion in the People's Republic of China.

The ruling CCP requires its members to be atheists or face expulsion from the party. After the proclamation of the People's Republic of China in 1949, CCP leaders viewed religion as a potential threat, associating it with foreign influence, feudalism, and superstition. During the Cultural Revolution (1966–1976), CCP Chairman Mao Zedong undertook a campaign to eliminate religion, which led to the widespread destruction of religious sites and persecution of believers. Under Deng Xiaoping, the CCP shifted to a regulatory policy, aimed at managing religion and using its influence to achieve other party objectives, as well as to suppress any threat it might present to the party's authority. Given the apparent expansion of religion in Chinese society in recent decades, CCP leaders have responded with a combination of regulations and repression.

The Xi general secretaryship has broadly followed a similar approach to religion and continued policies initiated by its predecessors. However, religious policy under Xi Jinping can be distinguished from that of the Hu Jintao era in four key ways: a set of new, more restrictive legal instruments has been introduced, religious persecution targets have broadened, there is increased state interference in daily religious practices, and there are new forms of technological surveillance.

In May 2015, sinicization entered the official discourse when Xi Jinping declared, at the Central United Front Work Conference, that religion in China should be adapted to align with socialist values and must adhere to the path of sinicization. The theme of religious sinicization has grown more prominent in official discourse. He further emphasized his strategy of religious Sinicisation in a speech in 2016. This was followed up in 2018 by the National People's Congress and Chinese People's Political Consultative Conference (CPPCC) approving the administrative, ideological, and legal frameworks for the policy of Sinicisation, with these measures coming into force on the 1st of February 2020.

The CCP's policy is an attempt to bring religions under state control and align them with Chinese culture. The campaign particularly affects religions deemed 'foreign', such as Christianity and Islam. Xi Jinping perceives these religions as susceptible to 'Western values' and extremism, which he considers to be a threat to his objectives.

The religious sinicization policy has three main focuses for the CCP to monitor and manage religion in China: bureaucratically, the CCP streamlines oversight of religion; ideologically, it reinforces Party influence over religious beliefs and practices; and legally, it provides the juridical framework to monitor and control the growth of religion and its influence in China. Religious Sinicization requires patriotic education and public displays of loyalty to the CCP in churches, mosques, and temples. The leaders of Christianity and Islam are expected to "align their teachings and customs with Chinese traditions and 'pledge loyalty' to the state". Thus, rather than adapting religion to Chinese culture and traditions, it is about making religions subservient to CCP ideology.

== Implementation and regulations ==
The Xi general secretaryship considers ideological security a component of national security, which has driven the implementation of numerous new laws and regulations to control religious activities in China. These measures seek to enshrine 'sinicization' as the dominant ideological pursuit for religious policy, and effectively render religious organizations as de facto subsidiaries of the state. The campaign to Sinicize religion seeks to require religions (particularly those with foreign origins) to align teachings, customs, and morality with Chinese culture.

The state has taken a more favorable view towards folk religion, which the PRC has at times past deemed superstition, encouraging the registration of temples and emphasizing their value as part of traditional Chinese culture. Previously, few temples were able to obtain registered legal status, often by registering as Buddhist or Daoist sites. Following policy changes in the Xi administration, folk religion temples can register as folk belief activities sites (minjian xinyang huodong changsuo).

Publishing in 2026, academic Yanfei Sun writes that Xi's public comments demonstrate more goodwill towards Buddhism than other religions. The state seeks to promote what it describes as the "healthy development" of Buddhism and Daoism, on the view that such development will help revitalize traditional Chinese culture and enhance China's international image. Measures in this regard include banning profit-making activities by both religions, and seeking to prevent local governments and businesses from what the state describes as exploiting these religions for financial gain. These address what the state perceives as over commercialization of Buddhism and Daoism during the earlier post-Mao years.

Article 3 of the revision expresses concerns about the "subversion" of religion, aiming to "uphold the principles of protecting what is legal, prohibiting what is illegal, suppressing extremism, resisting infiltration, and combating crime". The regulations seek to curb unauthorized activities like non-government-organized hajj, house churches, and online proselytizing. The drafters link "extremism" and "crime" to violence from independence movements in Xinjiang and Tibet, whilst "Infiltration" encompasses foreign missionary efforts perceived as attempts to "Westernize" and "divide" China, and restricts citizens’ involvement in religious activities overseas, a heretofore unprecedented measure.

In 2021, SARA issued the "Administrative Measures for Religious Clergy" (Order No. 15), which came into effect on May 1, 2021. The measures call for religious clergy to "love the motherland", "support the leadership of the Chinese Communist Party" and "adhere to the direction of the organization of religion in China." (Article 3). Religious clergy are expected to cultivate sinicization through their sermons (Art. 7). Chapter 5 establishes a database maintained by local religious affairs departments to track clergy "awards" and "punishments" (Art. 33), and Article 35 mandates training programs to enhance political education, which would be supported by this system (Art. 37).

In 2021, SARA issued the ‘Measures on the Administration of Religious Schools’, which emphasized Sinicization through resistance to foreign influence. Article 22 requires that religious schools implement education on ‘Xi Jinping Thought on Socialism with Chinese Characteristics for a New Era’.

== UFWD's role in sinicization ==
Previously, there were a range of official departments that contributed to the growth of religious followers and affiliated places of worship. For Protestants, it was the China Christian Council (CCC) and the Three-Self Patriotic Association (TPSM) which are examples of these religious actors. This changed in 2018, when the National People's Congress (NPC) and the Chinese People's Political Consultative Conference (CPPCC) put in place "ideological, legal and bureaucratic" structures to enforce the sinicization of religion and the centralization of religious actors.

The powers of these associations were then transferred to the Party's United Front Work Department, which seeks to "liase with and influence…non party groups". Sinicization has put restrictions on how much religious leaders can expand and adapt. For example, a report by Weishan Huang explains that an abbot's attempt to hire an architect to modernize a temple in Shanghai was denied as local authorities want to ensure that religion "remains frozen in the past while letting the Communist Party create a modern Chinese culture".

The UFWD is referred to by Xi Jinping as his magic weapon, which reports to the CCP's Central Committee and defends policies to sinicize China's minorities. Focused on the "Great Rejuvenation of the Chinese Nation", the UFWD is the CCP's tool for bringing together twelve primary groups into a united front under party leadership, thereby "neutralizing any opposition". This method creates an environment whereby these groups, including religious individuals, can be used to co-opt and influence others, with the UFWD being the "peak agency" for "ethnic and religious affairs".

The UFWD divides up labor while coordinating united front work. For religion, the UFWD controls the National Religious Affairs Administration (formerly the State Administration for Religious Affairs) which is directed by Chen Ruifeng, whom the UFWD has overseen since 2018. Some of its efforts include building databases of religious individuals at universities and monitoring religious activities of teachers and students, with a central theme of suppressing the belief in and practice of religion.

== Use of technology and surveillance for sinicization ==
The shrinking and control of religious space under Xi Jinping has become far more effective in an age of digital authoritarianism. The CCP has significantly expanded the use of technology to implement sinicization policies, with its efforts aimed at aligning religious practices with state-approved socialist ideals. The government employs a comprehensive digital surveillance infrastructure that includes advanced technologies such as artificial intelligence (AI), facial recognition, and biometric data collection. Public and private religious gatherings, particularly among Uighur Muslims and Tibetan Buddhists, are closely monitored using these technologies.

In particular, the use of facial recognition cameras is prominent in mosques, churches, and temples to track attendees and alert authorities if individuals flagged as potential threats appear. AI systems can identify religious markers in clothing and monitor large data sets for patterns of religious behavior that might indicate subversive activities. Furthermore, biometric data collection extends beyond visual tracking; in regions like Xinjiang, residents must undergo scans that include DNA sampling, iris imaging, and voice recording. This facilitates an extensive, multi-layered surveillance network that enables CCP authorities to maintain ubiquitous watch mechanisms on religious practices and identities.

The CCP's digital oversight extends to online activities. The government mandates that citizens install software on their mobile devices to log communications and media consumption, allowing real-time monitoring of religious expressions on platforms like WeChat. The Integrated Joint Operations Platform (IJOP) in Xinjiang aggregates data from various surveillance sources, flagging individuals who engage in behaviors such as frequent mosque visits or contact with international religious organizations.

== Institutional and cultural adaptations for sinicization ==
The institutional adaptations under Xi Jinping's sinicization policy involve profound changes in religious practices and governance. These include efforts to modify religious texts and symbols to align more closely with the CCP's ideology. In some registered churches, for instance, images of Jesus have been replaced with portraits of ‘Uncle Xi’, signaling loyalty to the state as a fundamental aspect of worship. This reflects a broader directive wherein religious teachings must emphasize core socialist values and discard elements perceived as incompatible with state ideology.

Religious institutions are increasingly subject to the oversight of the United Front Work Department (UFWD), consolidating power that once resided with separate agencies like the State Administration for Religious Affairs. This shift facilitates streamlined control over religious activities and curtails external influences. Protestant and Catholic churches, as well as other religious groups, are instructed to revise their religious texts. Leading seminaries are also required to produce new editions of scriptures, removing or altering content that challenges CCP hegemony.

The sinicization policy also targets informal religious gatherings. The state has tightened regulations on unregistered churches, often subjecting them to raids, closures, and increased surveillance.

== Impact and outlook ==
Administrative measures have weakened religious communities, but some believe that state control over these groups will never be complete, citing the continuation of religious activities across the nation. Some argue that the January 2024 agreement between China and the Vatican indicates a new level of trust, while others see this as the Vatican succumbing to Chinese pressure. Cross-province variations in the degree of the removal of religious symbols and affiliated places of worship also question the impact of sinicization in China. For example, some local congregations have managed to reach "accommodations with local officials about preserving them as cultural heritage" and have also managed to subtly give religious instruction to youth by listing places of worship as museums while continuing to function in a religious capacity.

Publishing in 2026, academic Yanfei Sun writes that religious policy in the Xi administration shows continuity with the post-Mao era, upholding principles of secularism but not taking steps to return to the radical religious policy positions of the Mao era. According to Sun, "[T]he Xi administration still follows the principles outlined in Document 19, published in 1992. State-sanctioned religions, including Protestantism and Catholicism, continue to enjoy legal protection under this administration." The administration has increased efforts to incorporate religious practice from the legal gray area (such as Protestant house churches) into the state-sanctioned system.
