= New social strata =

Chinese Communist Party term

- Simplified Chinese: 新的社会阶层人士
Transcriptions
Standard Mandarin
- Hanyu Pinyin: Xīnde shèhuì jiēcéng rénshì

New social strata is a political term used by the Chinese Communist Party and is one of the twelve principal targets of "united front work." It is generally listed alongside non-CCP members and non-CCP intellectuals.

== History ==
Jiang Zemin's Three Represents allowed members of the new social strata to join the Chinese Communist Party. In 2016, the United Front Work Department (UFWD) established a functional department responsible for the work of people from new social strata. December 2020 UFWD regulations defines new social strata as a separate aspect of the united front. At the Central United Front Work Conference held on July 29–30, 2022, Xi Jinping said, “We must do a good job in the united front work among non-Party intellectuals and new social strata.”

== Classification ==
The “new social strata” mainly include four groups:

- Managers and technical personnel of private and foreign-invested enterprises
- Social organization practitioners
- Freelancers
- New media practitioners

According to a 2021 survey, the total number of people in the new social strata in China was about 91 million, an increase of about 19 million compared to 2016, representing a 5-year increase of 26.3%.
