= Cindy Yang =

Cindy Yang may refer to:

- Li "Cindy" Yang, Chinese-American massage parlor owner and Trump fundraiser
- Cindy Yang (actress), Taiwanese actress
