= Cui Maohu =

Chinese politician

- 崔茂虎

Director of the National Religious Affairs Administration
- In office 7 June 2022 – 18 March 2023
- Premier: Li Keqiang
- Preceded by: Wang Zuo'an
- Succeeded by: Chen Ruifeng

Deputy Head of the United Front Work Department
- In office 7 June 2022 – 18 March 2023
- Head: You Quan; Shi Taifeng

Personal details
- Born: December 1965 (age 60) Xuanwei County, Yunnan, China
- Party: Chinese Communist Party (1990–2023; expelled)
- Education: Yunnan University

Cui Maohu (Chinese: 崔茂虎; pinyin: Cuī Màohǔ; born December 1965) is a Chinese politician who was director of the National Religious Affairs Administration, and a deputy head of the United Front Work Department, from 2022 to 2023. He was a representative of the 19th National Congress of the Chinese Communist Party.

== Career ==
Cui was born in Xuanwei County (now Xuanwei), Yunnan, in December 1965. In 1983, he was accepted to Yunnan University, majoring in philosophy. After graduating in 1987, he became a teacher at Qujing Finance and Trade School.

Cui got involved in politics in December 1989, and joined the Chinese Communist Party in May 1990. Cui was despatched to the Organization Department of the CCP Yunnan Provincial Committee in August 1994, becoming its deputy head in December 2007. He also served as head of Yunnan Provincial Human Resources and Social Security Department. In May 2017, he was named party chief of Lijiang, his first foray into a prefectural leadership role. He was appointed vice governor of Yunnan in May 2021 and six months later was admitted to member of the Standing Committee of the CCP Yunnan Provincial Committee, the province's top authority. He concurrently served as secretary-general of the CCP Yunnan Provincial Committee from November 2021 to June 2022.

In June 2022, he was chosen as director of the National Religious Affairs Administration, concurrently serving as deputy head of the United Front Work Department.

== Downfall ==
On 18 March 2023, he was put under investigation for alleged "serious violations of discipline and laws" by the Central Commission for Discipline Inspection (CCDI), the party's internal disciplinary body, and the National Supervisory Commission, the highest anti-corruption agency of China. On August 30, he was stripped of his posts within the CCP and in the public office. On September 4, he was detained by the Supreme People's Procuratorate. On December 15, he was indicted on suspicion of accepting bribes.

On 25 April 2024, Cui stood trial at the Intermediate People's Court of Shenyang on charges of taking bribes. He took advantage of his job to gain benefits for other individuals and enterprises in engineering contracting, payment disbursement, and appointment of politicians, in return for bribes paid in cash or gifts worth more than 10.43 million yuan ($1.45 million). On July 23, he was eventually sentenced to a 11-year jail and fined 1.5 million yuan for taking bribes, all property gained from the bribery would be turned over to the national treasury.

Government offices
Preceded by Xie Yi (解毅)	Head of Yunnan Provincial Human Resources and Social Security Department; 2014–2017	Succeeded by Yang Yujian (杨榆坚)
Preceded by Wang Zuo'an	Director of the National Religious Affairs Administration; 2022–present	Succeeded by Chen Ruifeng
Party political offices
Preceded by Luo Jie (罗杰)	Communist Party Secretary of Lijiang; 2017–2021	Succeeded by Pu Hong (浦虹)
Preceded by Chen Shun	Secretary-General of the CCP Yunnan Provincial Committee; 2021–2022	Succeeded by Qiu Jiang
