= United front in Taiwan =

Chinese Communist Party strategy applied to Taiwan

The united front in Taiwan is an aspect of the Chinese Communist Party (CCP) and the government of the People's Republic of China's larger united front strategy, applied to Taiwan, to achieve unification. It relies on the presence of pro-Beijing groups in Taiwan combined with a carrot-and-stick approach of threatening war with Taiwan while offering opportunities for business and cultural exchanges. According to officials of Taiwan's Mainland Affairs Council, the CCP has long relied on organized crime as part of its united front tactics in Taiwan. In Taiwan, opponents of Chinese unification often regard the "united front" strategy as part of Chinese imperialism and expansionism.

== History ==
In 2011, Xi Jinping instructed cadres to "make full use" of Mazu for promotion of Chinese unification. Temples in Taiwan, especially in rural areas, have been the most prominent targets for influence operations as they are meeting grounds for prominent local figures and financial donations to temples remain unregulated. The Chinese government sponsors religious trips to China for Taiwanese as part of an influence campaign.

Starting in 2017, the All-China Federation of Taiwan Compatriots took on a more prominent role in the CCP's united front efforts directed at Taiwan.

According to Sinologist Gerry Groot, the CCP's abrogation of one country, two systems in Hong Kong following the 2019–2020 Hong Kong protests "was noted in Taiwan, where it made the work of the tiny minority of pro-unification activists even harder and reinforced the skepticism of others regarding the value of CCP promises." Others have also perceived its failure to persuade Taiwanese.

In 2022, Taiwan's National Security Bureau chief stated that the CCP had provided training to local internet celebrities in "cognitive warfare" campaigns to spread propaganda.

In 2023, Taiwan's Mainland Affairs Council stated in a report that the CCP's united front efforts in Taiwan through "cognitive warfare" were increasing.

During the run-up to the 2024 Taiwanese presidential election, the All-China Federation of Taiwan Compatriots coordinated editorial attacks against Democratic Progressive Party presidential candidate Lai Ching-te, framing him as "pro-war"; Lai later won the election. In November 2023, Taiwanese prosecutors investigated individuals accused of recruiting Taiwanese tourists on trips to mainland China paid for by the Taiwan Affairs Office, in which they met with representatives of the United Front Work Department (UFWD) and were urged to vote for pan-Blue candidates. According to a Taiwan security official, more than 1,000 Taiwanese local officials had visited China on junkets in 2023. A Liberty Times investigation showed that almost 30% of the 456 borough chiefs in Taipei had taken trips in 2023 to mainland China subsidized by the Chinese government.

In 2025, Taiwan's Mainland Affairs Council stated that Douyin and Xiaohongshu are vectors for pro-unification propaganda. In 2026, Taiwan's National Security Bureau said that united front and infiltration activities geared toward the country's military had shift from mid-level officers to the rank and file.

== Organizations ==
Two bureaus of the Ministry of State Security (MSS), the China Institutes of Contemporary International Relations and the Institute of Taiwan Studies at the Chinese Academy of Social Sciences, share intelligence collection and analysis on Taiwan.

The UFWD sponsors paid trips and summer camps to mainland China for Taiwanese youth. The trips are reported to promote pro-Chinese unification sentiment.

Triads and Hongmen associations in Taiwan are also increasingly vectors of CCP influence operations. Taiwan's Ministry of the Interior stated that the MSS operates an "external liaison office" in Xiamen which communicates with and provides financial assistance to organized criminal groups in Taiwan.

== Responses ==
In January 2025, seven members of the Fukang Alliance Party were indicted on espionage charges. In February 2025, Taiwan's Ministry of Education barred two schools affiliated with the UFWD, Huaqiao University and Jinan University, from conducting exchanges in Taiwan. The ministry also stated it would no longer recognize qualifications from schools associated with the UFWD. The same month, the same ministry banned exchanges with the Seven Sons of National Defence. In March 2025, Taiwanese president Lai Ching-te gave a policy speech in which he promised greater efforts to crack down on PRC espionage and infiltration in Taiwan.

== See also ==
- Cross-Strait relations
- Political status of Taiwan
- China Council for the Promotion of Peaceful National Reunification
- Pro-Beijing camp (Taiwan)
- United front (China)
  - First and Second United Front
  - United front in Hong Kong
- Central Leading Group for Taiwan Affairs
  - Taiwan Affairs Office
    - Association for Relations Across the Taiwan Straits
