= United front (China) =

Political strategy of the Chinese Communist Party

United Front
- Simplified Chinese: 统一战线
- Traditional Chinese: 統一戰綫
Transcriptions
Standard Mandarin
- Hanyu Pinyin: Tǒngyī Zhànxiàn
- Wade–Giles: T'ung^{3}-i^{1} Chan^{4}-hsien^{4}
- IPA: [tʰʊ̀ŋ.í ʈʂân.ɕjɛ̂n]
Yue: Cantonese
- Yale Romanization: Túng-yāt Jin-sin
- Jyutping: Tung^{2}-jat^{1} zin^{3}-sin^{3}
- IPA: [tʰʊŋ˧˥.jɐt̚˥ tsin˧.sin˧]

Socialist United Front
- Simplified Chinese: 社会主义统一战线
- Traditional Chinese: 社會主義統一戰綫
Transcriptions
Standard Mandarin
- Hanyu Pinyin: Shèhuìzhǔyì Tǒngyī Zhànxiàn
- Wade–Giles: She^{4}-hui^{4}-chu^{3}-i^{4} T'ung^{3}-i^{1} Chan^{4}-hsien^{4}
- IPA: [ʂɤ̂.xwêɪ.ʈʂù.î tʰʊ̀ŋ.í ʈʂân.ɕjɛ̂n]
Yue: Cantonese
- Yale Romanization: Séh-wuí-jyú-yih Túng-yāt Jin-sin
- Jyutping: Se^{5}-wui^{2}-zyu^{2}-ji^{6} Tung^{2}-jat^{1} Zin^{3}-sin^{3}
- IPA: [sɛ˩˧.wuj˧˥.tsy˧˥.ji˨ tʰʊŋ˧˥.jɐt̚˥ tsin˧.sin˧]

Patriotic United Front
- Simplified Chinese: 爱国(主义)统一战线
- Traditional Chinese: 愛國(主義)統一戰綫
Transcriptions
Standard Mandarin
- Hanyu Pinyin: Aiguó(zhǔyì) Tǒngyī Zhànxiàn
- Wade–Giles: Ai-kuo^{2}(chu^{3}-i^{4}) T'ung^{3}-i^{1} Chan^{4}-hsien^{4}
- IPA: [ai.kwǒ.ʈʂù.î tʰʊ̀ŋ.í ʈʂân.ɕjɛ̂n]
Yue: Cantonese
- Yale Romanization: Ngoi-gwok(jyú-yih) Túng-yāt Jin-sin
- Jyutping: Ngoi^{3}-gwok^{3}(zyu^{2}-ji^{6}) Tung^{2}-jat^{1} Zin^{3}-sin^{3}
- IPA: [ŋɔj˧.kʷɔk̚˧.tsy˧˥.ji˨ tʰʊŋ˧˥.jɐt̚˥ tsin˧.sin˧]

People's Democratic United Front (1945–1966)
- Simplified Chinese: 人民民主统一战线
- Traditional Chinese: 人民民主統一戰綫
Transcriptions
Standard Mandarin
- Hanyu Pinyin: Rénmín Mínzhǔ Tǒngyī Zhànxiàn
- Wade–Giles: Jen^{2}-min^{2} Min^{2}-chu^{3} T'ung^{3}-i^{1} Chan^{4}-hsien^{4}
- IPA: [ɻə̌n.mǐn mǐn.ʈʂù tʰʊ̀ŋ.í ʈʂân.ɕjɛ̂n]
Yue: Cantonese
- Yale Romanization: Yàhn-màhn Màhn-jyú Túng-yāt Jin-sin
- Jyutping: Jan^{4}-man^{4} Man^{4}-zyu^{2} Tung^{2}-jat^{1} Zin^{3}-sin^{3}
- IPA: [jɐn˩.mɐn˩ mɐn˩.tsy˧˥ tʰʊŋ˧˥.jɐt̚˥ tsin˧.sin˧]

Revolutionary United Front (1966–1978)
- Simplified Chinese: 革命统一战线
- Traditional Chinese: 革命統一戰綫
Transcriptions
Standard Mandarin
- Hanyu Pinyin: Gémìng Tǒngyī Zhànxiàn
- Wade–Giles: Ko^{2}-ming^{4} T'ung^{3}-i^{1} Chan^{4}-hsien^{4}
- IPA: [kɤ̌.mîŋ tʰʊ̀ŋ.í ʈʂân.ɕjɛ̂n]
Yue: Cantonese
- Yale Romanization: Gaak-mihng Túng-yāt Jin-sin
- Jyutping: Gaak^{3}-ming^{6} Tung^{2}-jat^{1} Zin^{3}-sin^{3}
- IPA: [kak̚˧.mɪŋ˨ tʰʊŋ˧˥.jɐt̚˥ tsin˧.sin˧]

The united front, officially named the patriotic united front, (Note: Formerly known as the People's Democratic United Front (1945–1966) and the Revolutionary United Front (1966–1978).) is a political strategy of the Chinese Communist Party (CCP) involving networks of groups and key individuals that are influenced or controlled by the CCP and used to advance its interests. It has historically been a popular front that has included eight legally permitted political parties and people's organizations which have nominal representation in the National People's Congress (NPC) and the Chinese People's Political Consultative Conference (CPPCC).

The CCP first organized the "National Revolution United Front" during the Northern Expedition of 1926–1928 and then the "Workers' and Peasants' Democratic United Front" in the Chinese Soviet Republic era of 1931–1937. Mao Zedong later promoted the "Anti-Japanese National United Front". During the Chinese Civil War, the CCP organized the "people's democratic united front" to overthrow the Kuomintang. In 1966, during the Cultural Revolution, the "people's democratic united front" was renamed to the "revolutionary united front". In 1979, it assumed its current name of "patriotic united front", further expanding its scope. Under CCP general secretary Xi Jinping, the united front and its targets of influence have expanded in size and scope.

United front organizations are managed primarily by the United Front Work Department (UFWD), but the united front strategy is not limited solely to the UFWD. All CCP cadres are required to engage in "united front work". CPPCC is considered to be the highest-ranking united front organization, being central to the system. Outside of China, the strategy involves numerous front organizations, which tend to obfuscate or downplay any association with the CCP.

== History ==
The CCP organized the "National Revolution United Front" (simplified Chinese: 国民革命统一战线; traditional Chinese: 國民革命統一戰綫; pinyin: Guómín gémìng tǒngyī zhànxiàn) with the Kuomintang (KMT) during the Northern Expedition of 1926–1928 and then the "Workers' and Peasants' Democratic United Front" (simplified Chinese: 工农民主统一战线; traditional Chinese: 工農民主統一戰綫; pinyin: Gōngnóng mínzhǔ tǒngyī zhànxiàn) in the Chinese Soviet Republic era of 1931–1937. Mao Zedong originally promoted the "Anti-Japanese National United Front" (simplified Chinese: 抗日民族统一战线; traditional Chinese: 抗日民族統一戰綫; pinyin: Kàngrì mínzú tǒngyī zhànxiàn).

In late 1935, the Communist International (Comintern) instructed the CCP to establish the broadest possible anti-fascist united front. At a meeting in December 1935, the CCP Politburo resolved to reach understanding, seek compromise, and establish relations with all nations, parties, and individuals who opposed imperial Japan.

The united front "assumed its current form" in 1946, three years before the CCP defeated the KMT's Nationalist government of Chiang Kai-shek. According to CCP histography, the "people's democratic united front" was formed including "workers, peasants, the urban petty bourgeoisie, the national bourgeoisie, various democratic parties, enlightened gentry, other patriots, ethnic minorities, and overseas Chinese" to overthrow Chiang's government. Mao credited the united front as one of his "Three Magic Weapons" against the KMT—alongside the Leninist Chinese Communist Party and the Red Army—and credited the Front with playing a part in the Chinese Communist Revolution. In 1966, during the Cultural Revolution, the "people's democratic united front" was renamed to the "revolutionary united front".

On 1 September 1979, at a Politburo meeting hearing a report from the National United Front Work Conference, its name was changed to the "patriotic united front". Deng Xiaoping said "The united front at the present stage can be called a revolutionary and patriotic united front". The Resolution on Certain Questions in the History of Our Party since the Founding of the People's Republic of China, adopted in 1981, abandoned the previous formulation of the "revolutionary united front" and formally designated the united front in the new era as the "patriotic united front". According to the Chinese Communist Party News Network, this change "allows all individuals, groups, political parties, and organizations that love the motherland, regardless of social system, political stance, ideology, or lifestyle, to join the united front, thus further expanding its scope".

During Xi Jinping's second term, the State Administration for Religious Affairs, State Ethnic Affairs Commission, and Overseas Chinese Affairs Office were reorganized under the UFWD as part of Xi's consolidation of many state powers under the CCP.

== Organs ==
The two organs historically affiliated with the united front are the United Front Work Department and the Chinese People's Political Consultative Conference (CPPCC). According to Yi-Zheng Lian, the organs "are often poorly understood outside China because there are no equivalents for them in the West". Inside China, leaders of formal united front organizations are selected by the CCP, or are themselves CCP members. In practice, united front member parties and allied people's organizations are subservient to the CCP, and must accept the CCP's "leading role" as a condition of their continued existence.

=== United Front Work Department ===
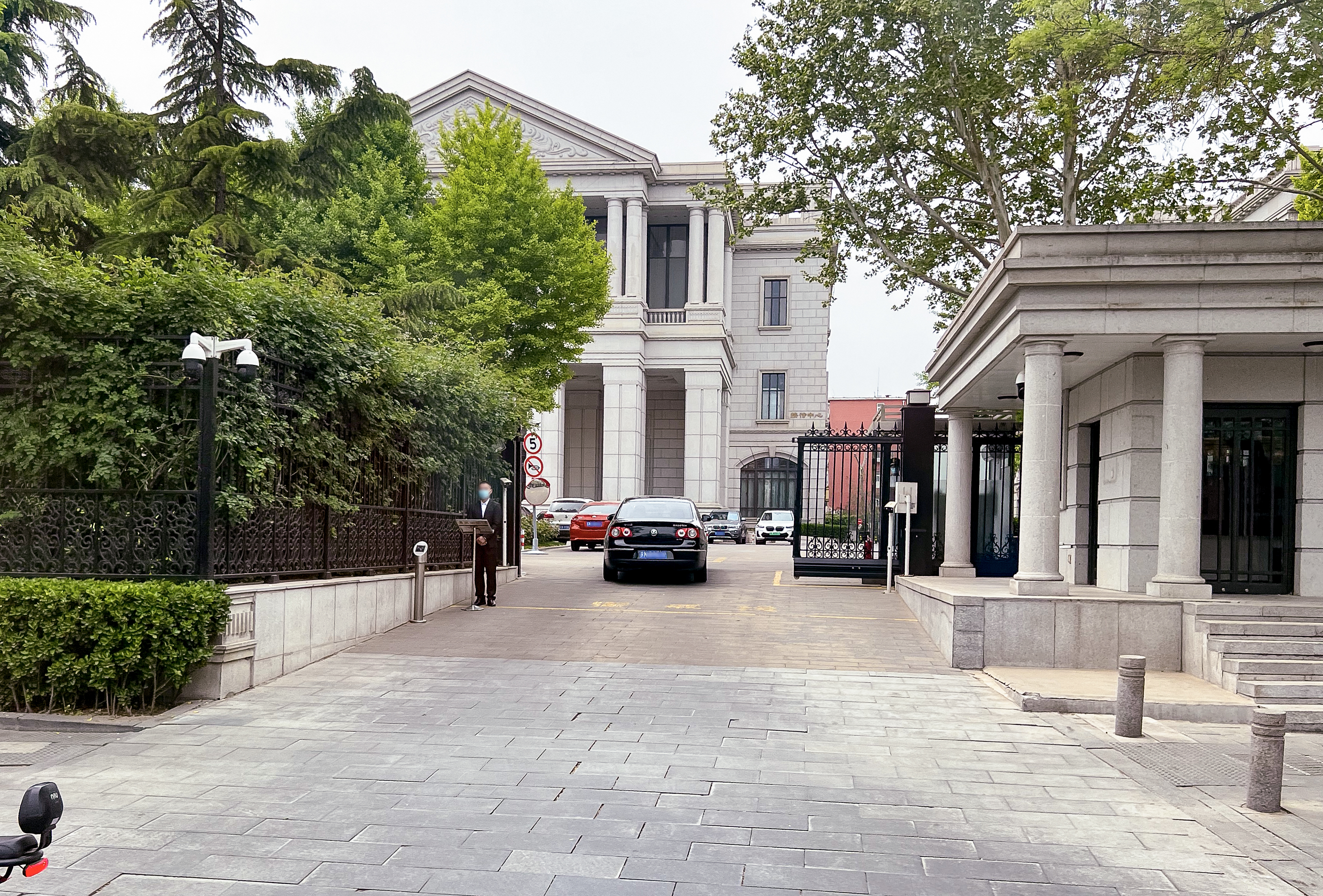
Entrance to UFWD headquarters in Beijing

The United Front Work Department is headed by the chief of the secretariat of the CCP's Central Committee. It oversees front organizations and their affiliates in multiple countries such as the Chinese Students and Scholars Association, which ostensibly helps Chinese students and academics studying or residing in the West, enjoining them to conduct "people-to-people diplomacy" on behalf of the People's Republic of China.

== Activities ==
The united front is a political strategy that the CCP has used to influence beyond its immediate circles while downplaying direct associations with the CCP. In theory, the united front existed to give front organizations and non-Communist forces a platform in society. Historically, the CCP co-opted and re-purposed non-Communist organizations to become part of the united front through tactics of entryism. However, scholars describe the contemporary united front as a complex network of organizations that engage in various types of surveillance and political warfare for the CCP. According to Neil Thomas of Asia Society, united front work is primarily domestic, calling it a "domestic apparatus whose tentacles extend beyond China’s borders".

Scholar Jichang Lulu noted that united front organizations abroad "re-purpose democratic governance structures to serve as tools of extraterritorial influence". Scholar Martin Thorley states that the united front's "main purposes are to neutralize threats to the party and ensure desirable scenarios for the party". Additionally, many non-governmental organizations in China or connected to China have been described as government-organized non-governmental organization (GONGOs) that are organized under the CCP's united front system.

According to a 2018 report by the United States–China Economic and Security Review Commission, "United Front work serves to promote Beijing's preferred global narrative, pressure individuals living in free and open societies to self-censor and avoid discussing issues unfavorable to the CCP, and harass or undermine groups critical of Beijing's policies." According to scholar Anne-Marie Brady, "united front work is a task of all CCP agencies (some more than others) as well as a basic task of every CCP member." Nearly all Chinese embassies include staff that are formally tasked with united front work. Embassies and consulates also maintain networks of "consular volunteers" that engage in united front work.

Scholar Jeffrey Stoff also argues that the CCP's "influence apparatus intersects with or directly supports its global technology transfer apparatus." In 2019, the united front's aggregate budget across multiple institutions was estimated at over $2.6 billion, which was larger than the Chinese Foreign Ministry's budget.

According to the Taiwanese Mainland Affairs Council, the united front uses internet celebrities to carry out infiltration campaigns on social media. United front groups have also been linked to organized crime in several countries.

Starting in January 2020, united front-linked organizations in Canada and other countries were activated to purchase, stockpile, and export personal protective equipment in response to the COVID-19 pandemic in mainland China. In September 2020, the CCP announced that it would strengthen united front work in the private sector by establishing more party committees in regional federations of industry and commerce (FIC), and by arranging a special liaison between FICs and the CCP.

Overseas Chinese hometown associations have been cultivated for united front work. During the APEC United States 2023 summit in San Francisco, united front groups, including hometown associations, coordinated with Chinese embassy officials to instigate violence against Tibetan, Uyghur, and Chinese dissident protesters.

=== Relationship with intelligence agencies ===
In 1939, Zhou Enlai espoused "nestling intelligence within the united front" while also "using the united front to push forth intelligence". According to Australian analyst Alex Joske, "the united front system provides networks, cover and institutions that intelligence agencies use for their own purposes". Joske added that "united front networks are a golden opportunity for Party's spies because they represent groups of Party-aligned individuals who are relatively receptive to clandestine recruitment." Peter Mattis, head of the Jamestown Foundation, stated, "United front groups are used – very specifically – to hide the Ministry of State Security". According to French journalist Roger Faligot, the aftermath of the 1989 Tiananmen Square protests and massacre led to the "growing use of party organizations, such as the United Front Work Department and friendship associations, as fronts for intelligence operations."

== Organizations affiliated with the united front ==
In 2020, Newsweek identified nearly 600 united front organizations in the United States and 384 in the United Kingdom as of 2023. In 2026, the Jamestown Foundation identified 967 united front organizations in the United States, 575 in Canada, 405 in the United Kingdom, and 347 in Germany.

=== Organizations managed by or affiliated with the United Front Work Department ===
- All-China Federation of Industry and Commerce
- Center for China and Globalization
- China Council for the Promotion of Peaceful National Reunification
- China News Service
- Chinese People's Association for Friendship with Foreign Countries
- Chinese Students and Scholars Association
- Religious organizations formerly managed by the State Administration for Religious Affairs:
  - Buddhist Association of China
  - Chinese Taoist Association
  - Islamic Association of China
  - Three-Self Patriotic Movement
  - Catholic Patriotic Association
- National Ethnic Affairs Commission

=== Other united front organizations ===
- China Council for the Promotion of International Trade (Ministry of Commerce)
- China International Culture Exchange Center (Ministry of State Security)
- Institute for China-America Studies

== See also ==
- United front in Taiwan
- United front in Hong Kong
- Confucius Institutes
- Non-Party intellectuals
