= 2004 amendment to the Constitution of China =

Amendment to the Constitution of the People's Republic of China

National People's Congress
- Territorial extent: China
- Passed by: National People's Congress
- Passed: 14 March 2004
- Effective: 14 March 2004

Codification
- Acts amended: Constitution of the People's Republic of China
- Introduced by: Standing Committee of the National People's Congress
- Voting summary: 2,863 voted for; 10 voted against; 17 abstained
- Status: In force

The Amendment to the Constitution of the People's Republic of China was proposed by the 16th Central Committee of the Chinese Communist Party and adopted at the second session of the 10th National People's Congress on 14 March 2004.

The amendments incorporated Three Represents to the constitution and included guarantees regarding private property.

== History ==
On 27 March 2003, National People's Congress Standing Committee Chairman Wu Bangguo was appointed as the head of a taskforce to draft amendments to the constitution. From January 18 to 19, 2004, the second plenary session of the 19th CCP Central Committee was held and adopted the “Proposal of the Central Committee of the Chinese Communist Party on Amending Part of the Constitution". It was the first amendment to the constitution to have been endorsed by the Central Committee, in addition to approval by the Politburo. On January 26, the CCP Central Committee submitted the proposal to the Standing Committee of the National People's Congress. On 14 March 2004, the second session of the 10th National People's Congress passed the Constitutional Amendment with 2,863 votes in favor, 10 votes against, and 17 abstentions.

== Amendments ==
The amendment contains 14 articles. It incorporated the Three Represents into the Constitution. Martial law was renamed to the state of emergency and the amendments authorized the President to declare a state of emergency based on the decision of the National People's Congress. In addition, the March of the Volunteers was given constitutional status as the national anthem of China. The amendments included guarantees regarding private property ("legally obtained private property of the citizens shall not be violated") and human rights ("the State respects and protects human rights").The government argued that this represented progress for Chinese democracy and was a sign from the CCP that they recognized the need to adapt to the booming Chinese economy, which had created a growing middle class who wanted private property protections. It also authorized the government to "expropriate", in addition to "requisitioning", private property in the public interest, if it "makes compensation according to law".

Chinese leader Hu Jintao said that "These amendments of the Chinese constitution are of great importance to the development of China [...] We will make serious efforts to carry them out in practice."
