= China Council for the Promotion of Peaceful National Reunification =

Organization promoting unification between mainland China and Taiwan

- 中国和平统一促进会
- Abbreviation: CCPPNR
- Formation: September 22, 1988; 37 years ago
- Purpose: Chinese unification
- Headquarters: Beijing
- President: Wang Huning
- Executive Vice President: Li Ganjie
- Parent organization: United Front Work Department
- Website: www.zhongguotongcuhui.org.cn

CCPPNR organization
- Simplified Chinese: 中国和平统一促进会
- Traditional Chinese: 中國和平統一促進會
- Literal meaning: Organization for Promoting Peaceful Reunification of China
Transcriptions
Standard Mandarin
- Hanyu Pinyin: Zhōngguó hépíngtǒngyī cùjìn huì

CCPPNR conference
- Simplified Chinese: 全球华侨华人促进中国和平统一大会
- Traditional Chinese: 全球華僑華人促進中國和平統一大會
- Literal meaning: Overseas Chinese World Conference for Promoting Peaceful Reunification of China
Transcriptions
Standard Mandarin
- Hanyu Pinyin: quánqiú huáqiáo Huárén cùjìn Zhōngguó hépíngtǒngyī dàhuì

The China Council for the Promotion of Peaceful National Reunification (CCPPNR) is a semi-official umbrella organization that promotes unification between mainland China and Taiwan under the People's Republic of China (PRC). The council was founded in 1988 by Taiwanese author Chen Yingzhen in Beijing under the guidance of the United Front Work Department (UFWD) of the Central Committee of the Chinese Communist Party (CCP), and operates under the UFWD's control. The organization officially supports unification under the "one country, two systems" framework.

According to scholar Anne-Marie Brady, in addition to promoting unification, "the organization also engages in a range of activities which support Chinese foreign policy goals." The main council oversees over 200 chapters in over 90 countries.

The group holds an annual Overseas Chinese World Conference for Promoting Peaceful Reunification of China. This event has been held in multiple countries and is coordinated by local councils and other front organizations linked to the United Front Work Department. The council is currently presided by Wang Huning, chairman of the Chinese People's Political Consultative Conference, with UFWD head Li Ganjie as its executive vice president.

== History ==
The council was set up in 1988 by Taiwanese author Chen Yingzhen in Beijing under the guidance of paramount leader Deng Xiaoping and the CCP's United Front Work Department in order to promote Chinese unification and oppose Taiwan independence.

The council was previously chaired by Wang Yang and vice chair You Quan. On 11 September 2023, Chinese People's Political Consultative Conference (CPPCC) chairman Wang Huning was elected as the president of the council.

== Functions ==
The council is a united front organization, designed to promote unification with Taiwan, coming under the purview of the United Front Work Department. It is led by a president, elected at a plenary meeting of the council; though not required by law, the CCPPNR is usually led by the chairman of the CPPCC while the head of the United Front Work Department serves as its executive vice president.

According to scholar Anne-Marie Brady, in addition to promoting unification, "the organization also engages in a range of activities which support Chinese foreign policy goals, including block-voting and fund-raising for ethnic Chinese political candidates who agree to support their organization's agenda." Scholars and observers have noted that the council and its events are part of the political influence agenda of the CCP and that Taiwan has never been under the control of the PRC.

== Branches ==
The council's main body oversees more than 200 chapters in multiple countries. As of 2019, the council had chapters in at least 91 countries, as well as five transnational chapters.

=== Australia ===
In 2019, it was reported that the Australia-based branch, the Australia Council for Promotion of Peaceful Reunification (ACPPRC), was not registered as a foreign agent even though it acts to influence Australian politics. The ACPPRC was previously headed by Huang Xiangmo who was subsequently banned from entering Australia due to national security concerns.

=== Japan ===
The Japanese branch of the council was established in Tokyo in 2000. Its affiliate branches include All-Japan Overseas Chinese China Peaceful Reunification Council (全日本華僑華人中国平和統一促進会), established in 2005, and the All-Japan Chinese Council for the Promotion of the Peaceful Unification of China (全日本華人促進中国平和統一協議会), established in 2018. The council also lists the Japan Overseas Chinese Federation (日本华侨华人联合会) as an affiliate in its website.

=== New Zealand ===
The New Zealand branch of the council, founded in 2000, is called the Peaceful Reunification of China Association of New Zealand.

=== Turkey ===
The Turkish branch of the council is called the China Peaceful Unification Association (CPUA, 土耳其中国和平统一促进会, Turkish: Çin’in Barışçıl Birleşmesi Derneği). During the COVID-19 pandemic in Turkey, the CPUA donated medical face masks to the Istanbul municipal government, as well as to Istanbul's Maltepe and Beşiktaş districts.

=== United States ===
National Association for China's Peaceful Unification
- Abbreviation: NACPU
- Tax ID no.: 47-3699634
- Headquarters: Washington, D.C.
- Website: www.nacpu.org

In the United States, multiple local councils exist and a national-level council is registered as a non-profit called the National Association for China's Peaceful Unification (NACPU). NACPU is also registered under the Foreign Agents Registration Act (FARA). Some of NACPU's leadership overlaps with a similar group, the Alliance for China's Peaceful Reunification (ACPR), which has organized protests against visits to the U.S. by Taiwanese officials such as Tsai Ing-wen. In 2019, the council had 36 chapter organizations throughout the US, located across ten states, Washington, D.C., as well as US territories of Puerto Rico and Guam.

In 2019, U.S. congressional representative Judy Chu was named "honorary chairwoman" of a branch council called the Forums for Peaceful Reunification of China, an organization opposed to Taiwanese independence.

In 2019, Li "Cindy" Yang, a vice-president of the organization's Florida-based council, was investigated by the Federal Bureau of Investigation for allegedly "peddling access" to Mar-a-Lago. Subsequently, the Florida branch, named the Florida Association for China Unification Inc., filed for dissolution. Despite evidence that laws may have been broken, the Federal Election Commission (FEC) voted not to investigate elections finance law complaints against Yang.

In September 2020, U.S. Secretary of State Mike Pompeo stated that the State Department had begun reviewing the activities of the CCPPNR in the U.S. In October 2020, NACPU was designated a foreign mission by the United States Department of State.

In 2022, the U.S. National Counterintelligence and Security Center issued a warning notice to state and local leaders citing the NACPU, the Chinese People's Association for Friendship with Foreign Countries, and the United Front Work Department.

In 2023, the founder of the Texas Council for the Promotion of China's Peaceful Reunification, John Shing-Wan Leung, was jailed for life in China on espionage charges.

In May 2023, the founder of the New England Alliance for the Peaceful Unification of China (NEAPUC), Liang Litang, was indicted for acting as an unregistered foreign agent of the Chinese government and for surveilling and harassing Chinese dissidents. He was later found not guilty.

== See also ==
- One China
- Two Chinas
- Cross-Strait relations
