= Liyang (disambiguation) =

Liyang (溧阳) is a county-level city in Jiangsu, China.

Liyang may also refer to the following places in China:

- Liyang, Huangshan (黎阳), a town in Huangshan, Anhui
- Liyang, He County (历阳), a town in He County, Anhui
- Liyang, Henan (黎阳), a town in Xun County, Henan
- Liyang, Shanxi (李阳), a town in Heshun County, Shanxi
- Liyang, Zhejiang (力洋), a town in Ninghai County, Zhejiang
- Liyang Township (丽阳乡), a township in Jingdezhen, Jiangxi
- Liyang Subdistrict, Xi'an (栎阳街道), a subdistrict in Lintong District, Xi'an, Shaanxi
- Liyang Subdistrict, Li County (澧阳街道), a subdistrict in Li County, Hunan

== See also ==
- Li Yang (disambiguation) – a list of people
