= Three Represents =

Chinese political theory by Jiang Zemin

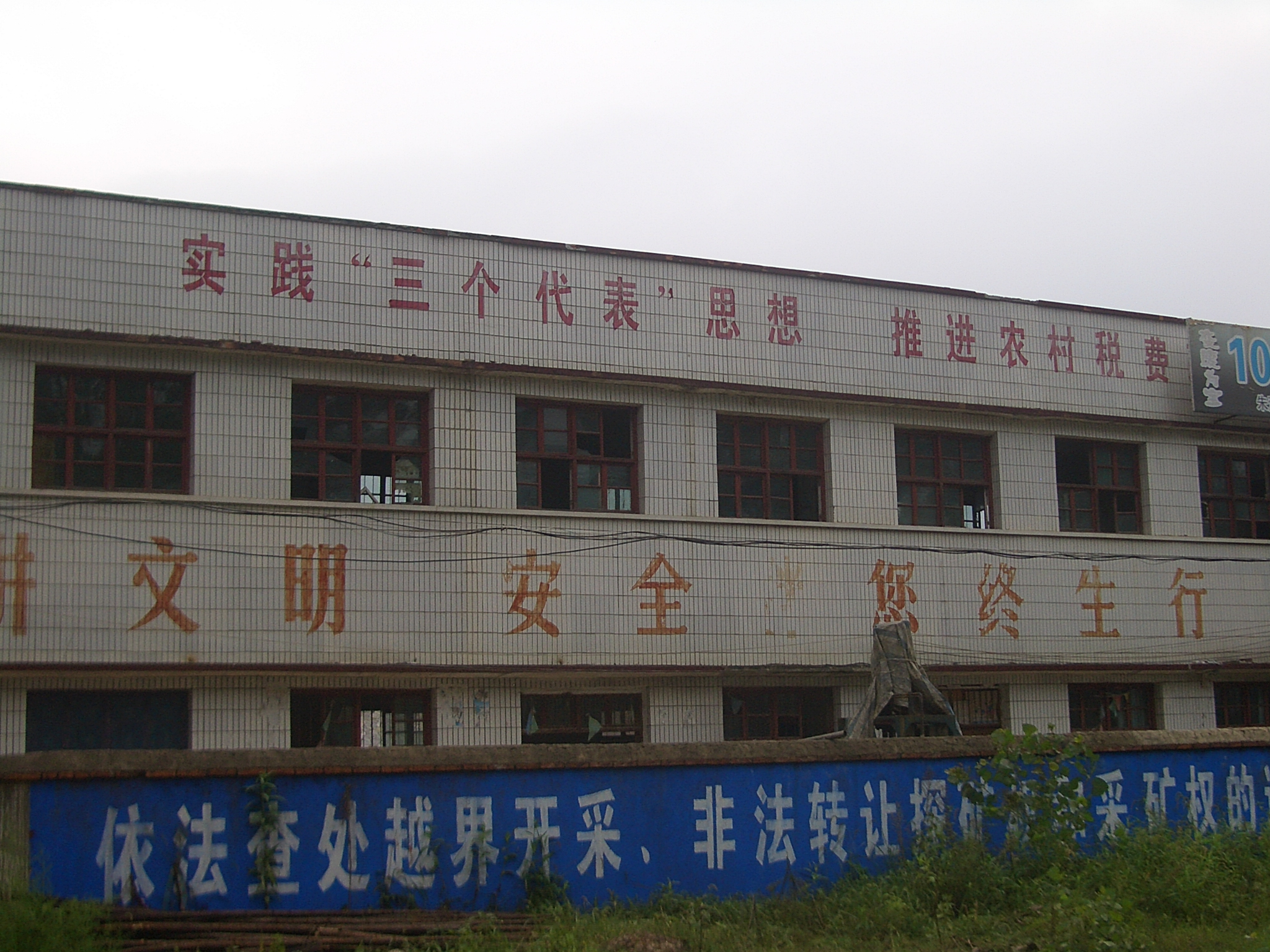
- A slogan in Futu, Hubei, reads: "Practise the Thought of Three Represents, advance the reform on rural tax system". The word "reform" (改革) is blocked by a billboard.
- Simplified Chinese: 「三个代表」重要思想
- Traditional Chinese: 「三個代表」重要思想
Transcriptions
Standard Mandarin
- Hanyu Pinyin: "Sān gè dàibiǎo" zhòngyào sīxiǎng

The Three Represents, officially the Theory of Three Represents, is a political doctrine that defines the role of the Chinese Communist Party (CCP) in Chinese society. It legitimized the entry of the new social strata, including private business owners and bourgeois elements, into the CCP.

The theory was first introduced by Jiang Zemin—then the General Secretary of the CCP—on 25 February 2000, while he was on the inspection tour in Gaozhou, Guangdong. During Jiang's leadership, the Three Represents was officially described as the "Marxism for contemporary China" and the development of Marxism–Leninism, Mao Zedong Thought and Deng Xiaoping Theory. The theory was ratified by the party at the 16th Party Congress in November 2002. It was also added to the Chinese Constitution on March 14, 2004.

The doctrine led to a co-optation strategy by the CCP in order to integrate elites, such as entrepreneurs with skilled expertise, into the CCP. This strategy has been seen as essential to win the support of the economic and political elites, as well as crucial for the party's long-term survival and success in promoting economic modernization.

== Background ==
The origins of the People's Republic of China's transition to a more open and modern country dates back to the late-1970s, after the death of Mao Zedong. The reform and opening up led by Deng Xiaoping in 1978 kickstarted the shift of the CCP from the traditional Maoism ideology towards a socialist market-oriented approach. These reforms have led to the opening up of both the state-owned and private economic sectors and have been imperative to advancing China's stagnated economy. However, the 1989 Tiananmen Square protests and massacre were a major setback to these economic reforms. In these protests, thousands of students called for greater freedom of speech, more economic freedom, and stricter curbs on corruption.

The 1989 Tiananmen Square protests and massacre were seen by many Chinese businessmen and women as a symbol of change - these protests have changed the way economic and political elites perceive themselves and their role in the political discourse. This served as a reminder for the CCP that businesspeople have the potential to generate democratization movements that may threaten the regime. As a result, the CCP banned businesspeople from joining the party, which led to a setback of the co-optation strategy from the late 1980s to early 1990s.

== History and development ==
Following the tenure of Deng Xiaoping, Jiang Zemin articulated a new theory to define the new relationship between the party and the people, which is named Three Represents. The Three Represents was devised by a small team including the political theorist Wang Huning. Jiang first delivered a speech about the Three Represents on 25 February 2000 during a symposium on party building in Guangzhou. It brought wide attention and many interpretations of the meaning of the speech. This political theory informs the CCP's co-optation strategy and shows the CCP's desire to bring economic and political elites into the party because they have the skills party leaders need in order to accomplish their policy agenda of economic modernization.

The Three Represents results from Jiang Zemin's efforts to grapple with the diverse class backgrounds of party members and their sometimes conflicting material interests. Based on Mao's premise that the Communist Party should serve the people, it became important as China's private sector grew to bring "worthy people from all sectors who are loyal to the motherland and to socialism" into the Party.

In Jiang's speech on the Three Represents on the 80th anniversary of the founding of the CCP in 2001, he claimed that the expansion of "working class" would help the party remain advanced as the vanguard of the working class by expanding its popular support and increasing its social influence. Jiang made a statement on the concept of the working class that it includes intellectuals:

"With intellectuals being part of the working class, the scientific, technical and educational level of the working class has been raised considerably... Consequently some workers have changed their jobs. But this has not changed the status of the Chinese working class. On the contrary, this will serve to improve the overall quality of the working class and give play to its advantages as a group in the long run. The Chinese working class has always been the basic force for promoting the advanced productive forces in China. Our Party must remain the vanguard of the working class and unswervingly and wholeheartedly rely on the working class."

The Three Represents were written into the CCP constitution to be part of CCP's guiding ideology during the 16th Party National Congress in November 2002. It was also written to the Chinese Constitution on 14 March 2004.

== Content ==
The theory requires the CCP to:

1. Represent the development trend of China's advanced productive forces.
2. Represent the orientation of China's advanced culture.
3. Represent the fundamental interests of the overwhelming majority of the Chinese people.

In this context, to "represent" means to incorporate.

== Rationale ==
The CCP's strategy to maintain regime stability includes the co-optation of economic and political elites. Bruce J. Dickson, a prominent scholar in academic research on political change in China, theorizes two main reasons why the CCP has adopted this co-optation strategy.

The first main reason, Dickson argues, is that entrepreneurs and the economic elite have benefitted the People's Republic of China (PRC) by creating new jobs, leading to greater prosperity across China. By co-opting Chinese businessmen and women into the CCP, the CCP by default becomes connected to the architects of China's growing economy and thus linked to those who are needed to continue this economic growth. Dickson argues that China's increasing prosperity is the "main source of the CCP's contemporary claim to legitimate rule", and therefore, it is through maintaining this increase in prosperity that the CCP can ensure its own survival. In other words, the co-optation of the economic elite is necessary to promote economic modernization and increasing prosperity, which fuels the CCP's political legitimacy. The second main reason is that by co-opting economic elites into the CCP, the party can "pre-empt efforts by these new elites either to form their own groups in opposition to the Party or to align with other regime opponents". The CCP were concerned that if the economic elites continued to be excluded from the CCP, they might organize against the party, with their growing economic power and resources translating into significant political clout.

Shabrina and Winarsih (2016) argue a third reason for the CCP's adoption of the co-optation strategy – the CCP's desire for party leadership and membership to represent the large majority of Chinese people. As China's middle class began to grow exponentially at the start of the 21st century, the CCP determined it was important not to exclude or marginalize this growing social class from CCP activities and instead decided to involve economic elites in various political processes. The CCP's desire to represent the interests of the majority of Chinese people (or at least to be seen to do this) is shown through Jiang Zemin's Three Represents slogan; a redefinition of the CCP's relationship with Chinese society in which the Party claims to represent not only the proletariat, but also society's "advanced productive forces", which is referring to "the growing urban middle class of businesspeople, professionals, and high-tech specialists".

== Implementation ==
The CCP has utilized a dual approach in co-opting the business sector within its political control. This includes both entrepreneurs joining the Party as members and legislators, as well as the CCP itself forming organizations within private enterprises to oversee its internal actions. The CCP does this not only to prevent any sort of alternative power center but to also glean important insight and support from business leaders in China. This model can be described as 'state corporatism', geared towards extending control as opposed to a need to balance interests.

Motivating the entrepreneurial class to be incorporated within the party is both self-interest and fear. By being a part of the CCP, the business community can benefit from state support. The state's complete authority within the economy necessitates friendly relations to ensure smooth functioning of their economic interests. The CCP also uses its controlling levers to force business leaders and enterprises to follow the party line. After Jack Ma of Alibaba openly criticized state control of the banking sector at the Shanghai Bund Summit in October 2020, China's market regulator announced the launch of an antitrust inquiry into Alibaba. This has repeated with the former chairman of the Anbang Insurance group, Wu Xiahao, who was sentenced to 18 years in prison for criticizing the CCP. Ye Jianming of CEFC China Energy was also detained in 2014. These moves show the CCP's capacity and incentive to target those critical of its regime.

Since the policy shift under Jiang Zemin, the PRC has been incorporating business leaders into the membership of the party. This creates "ties to wealthy and successful entrepreneurs". Economic and political elites may serve in internal committees or even "serve as delegates in legislative congresses", bringing their experience and expertise to strengthen CCP functioning and administration. Within the CCP, licensed associations for independent entrepreneurs have also been created, which coordinate actions between entrepreneurs and members of the CCP. New committees within the CCP have also been created to cater for a specific function that the Party requires. These groups are managed by "officials from the party" to ensure that entrepreneurs follow Party guidelines and do not stray from CCP ideology.

The CCP also creates branches within private enterprises to supervise their actions and ensure total authority. In March 2012, CCP general secretary Xi Jinping issued an official document, directing the party to "comprehensively cover" private enterprise, in line with the 1993 Company Law of the People's Republic of China that requires all companies to host CCP units within their administration. CCP penetration into the private sector has increased as China's economy continues to grow, with "92% of China's top 500 private enterprises" hosting party cells within their company. The CCP gives greater attention to these large firms, providing "full-time secretaries and party workers" that oversee company decisions and governance. These cells ensure that enterprises follow guidelines, laws, and regulations while also ensuring that their personnel are regularly taught Party positions and ideology.

=== Influence and reception ===
Jiang's theory was the subject of significant internal debate. Supporters viewed it as a further development of socialism with Chinese characteristics or a mechanism to incorporate bourgeois elements into the discipline of the party. Certain segments within the CCP criticized the Three Represents as being un-Marxist and a betrayal of basic Marxist values. Criticism originated on all ideological sides of the party. Three Represents was officially described by Li Changchun, a member of the CCP Politburo Standing Committee, as the "Marxism for contemporary China". The theory officially is continuation and development of Marxism–Leninism, Mao Zedong Thought and Deng Xiaoping Theory.

Jiang said that by representing Chinese people in three levels, the party used the interests and demands of the overwhelming majority of the people to replace the specific interests of people from different quarters, especially the class nature of the working class. As Xiao Gongqin argues, the innovation of the "Three Represents" theory was meant to complete the historical ideology transformation of CCP from a revolutionary party to a ruling party. The CCP can keep its legitimacy under the 'socialist market economy' or any system that is conducive to the development of advanced productive forces, without promoting any revolutionary movement or keeping the ideal of egalitarianism.

Jiang disagreed with the assertion that his theories were not Marxist, and concluded that attaining the communist mode of production (as formulated by earlier communists) was more complex than had been realized; it was useless to try to force a change, as it had to develop naturally by following the economic laws of history. The theory is most notable for allowing capitalists, officially referred to as the "new social strata", to join the party on the grounds that they engaged in "honest labour and work" and through their labour contributed "to build[ing] socialism with Chinese characteristics." Jiang's decision to allow capitalists into the CCP was criticized as "political misconduct" and "ideological confusions". These critiques helped fuel the rise of the Chinese New Left movement.

Zheng Bijian, the executive vice president of the Central Party School who has been active in helping to create the Three Represents, argued that a party of the whole people would be a catch-all party that would include diverse and conflicting interests. To include all of the broad mass of contemporary Chinese intellectuals, science and technology workers, cultural workers, and economic managers, in the category of the so-called 'middle class' would weaken or even obliterate the working class. At the time Jiang announced the theory, most entrepreneurs who were members of the CCP had been party members before starting their businesses. This change allowed for a new cohort of party members who could join after having had success in business. The greatest jump in the numbers of party members who are also entrepreneurs came in 2001, not long after the announcement of the Three Represents. In recent years (as of 2022), around 30-35% of Chinese entrepreneurs have been party members.

Academic Lin Chun writes that while "nothing was politically incorrect in this banal statement" of the Three Represents, "it simply signaled that the party no longer even pretended to be the vanguard of the working class." Academics Steve Tsang and Olivia Cheung observe that the Three Represents helped co-opt economic elites and extend the party's reach into the growing private sector. Academic Pang Laikwan describes the Three Represents as legitimating privately owned enterprises in the context of the socialist market economy. Recently the co-optation strategy has been retracted by the CCP. Since Xi Jinping succeeded as the CCP general secretary and took power in 2012, many elites and business owners have been under threat from the CCP's reform spree, which includes the implementation of the anti-corruption campaign and strict guidelines on many technology companies. In other words, under Xi's administration, the co-optation strategy has been undermined, though it is still relevant towards understanding the CCP's membership demographic.

=== Assessment of the strategy ===
The co-optation strategy has been considered widely successful, which is reflected in the steady increase of businesspeople into CCP membership; from 13% of CCP members in 1993, to 20% in 1999, and then to 34% in 2004. The co-optation strategy is considered to be a successful attempt by the CCP to assure their government's survival. During Jiang Zemin's term as General Secretary of the CCP, and subsequently under the Hu Jintao and Wen Jiabao administration, there has been rapid economic growth in China, which scholars argue could partly be a result of the CCP's adoption of the co-optation strategy. From 1979 to 2018, China's annual real GDP growth averaged 9.5%, compared to 6.7% from 1953 to 1978.

The introduction of the co-optation strategy to the CCP has created division within the party over whether this represented a break away from the party's ideology. Opponents of co-optation have argued that the inclusion of entrepreneurs within the party represents the interests of private capital triumphing over those of the working class, otherwise known as the proletariat. By allowing those who exploit the proletariat to enter the Party, the CCP is breaking from its traditions in favor of private enterprises and wealth accumulation. The critics of the co-optation strategy tended to be the more orthodox Marxist members of the CCP. Their vocal and public criticism of Jiang's support for co-optation resulted in his banning of Marxist newspapers within the PRC. These critics believed that not only was co-optation at odds with the ideology of the CCP but that it would begin to transform Chinese Society away from its traditional values and could result in the eventual collapse of the regime. This belief that co-optation would ultimately result in the destruction of the party is closely tied to the modernization theory, which states that as a nation develops, it will tend towards democratization.

The co-optation of private enterprises into the CCP has allowed for massive economic growth within the country, with many CEOs of these enterprises generating vast amounts of wealth. The role of entrepreneurs within China is rapidly changing and many of its richest citizens are attempting to leave the country with their wealth. This is a direct result of Xi Jinping's decision to restrict the excess wealth of these individuals, with many being pressured into donating billions to social causes like low-income housing. Those who have fallen afoul of the state, often due to corruption and refusal to pay taxes, face lengthy prison sentences or steep fines. This, coupled with the effects of COVID-19 lockdowns in China, has led to a massive drop in the wealth of entrepreneurs and many are looking to flee the country, taking large parts of the Chinese economy along with them. Under Xi Jinping's leadership, the CCP has begun to move away from the co-optation strategy it has previously employed, instead beginning to favour an approach that aims to promote common prosperity throughout China.

== See also ==
- Succession of power in China
- Ideology of the Chinese Communist Party
