= Huasheng Morning Post =

Chinese newspaper

- Type: Daily newspaper
- Owner: United Front Work Department
- Founded: 1956
- Language: Chinese
- Headquarters: Nanning, Guangxi
- Website: szb.hscbw.com:8082

Huasheng Morning Post (华声晨报; 華聲晨報), or Huasheng Chenbao, also transliterated as Huasheng Morning News, is a Nanning-based Chinese morning newspaper that is publicly issued to China and abroad.

Huasheng Morning Post also has two weekly digests, namely Huasheng Morning Post - World Reference and Huasheng Morning Post - World Column.

== History ==
Huasheng Morning Post, founded in 1956, was sponsored and supervised by Overseas Exchange Association of Guangxi Zhuang Autonomous Region.
