= Wang Zuo'an =

Chinese politician

- 王作安
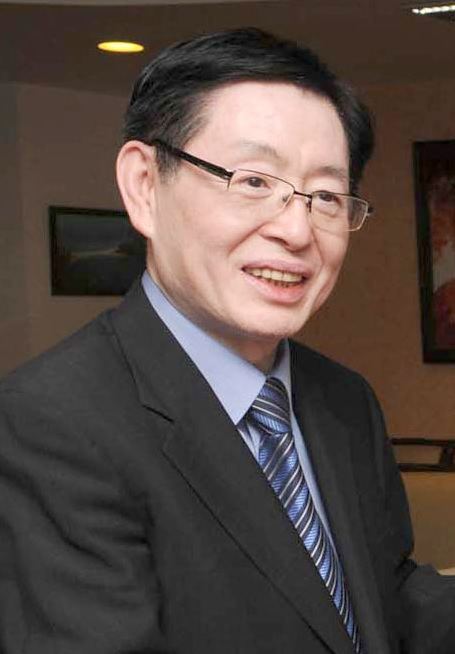
- Wang in April 2015.

Director of the State Administration for Religious Affairs
- In office September 2009 – June 2022
- Premier: Li Keqiang
- Preceded by: Ye Xiaowen
- Succeeded by: Cui Maohu

Personal details
- Born: May 1958 (age 68) Yixing, Jiangsu, China
- Party: Chinese Communist Party
- Education: Nanjing University

Wang Zuo'an (Chinese: 王作安; pinyin: Wāng Zuó'ān; born May 1958) is a Chinese politician who served as director of the State Administration for Religious Affairs and vice-minister of the United Front Work Department from 2009 to 2022.

He was an alternate member of the 18th Central Committee of the Chinese Communist Party. He was a member of the 12th and 13th Standing Committee of the Chinese People's Political Consultative Conference.

== Biography ==
Wang was born in Yixing, Jiangsu, in May 1958. He entered the workforce in September 1977, and joined the Chinese Communist Party in June 1985. After the Cultural Revolution in 1977, he worked in a ceramic factory in his hometown. After the resumption of College Entrance Examination, he entered the Nanjing University, where he majored in philosophy.

After university, he was assigned to the United Front Work Department, where he worked until 1987. In August 1987 he was transferred to the State Administration for Religious Affairs and over a period of 30 years worked his way up to the position of Director. He concurrently serving as vice-minister of the United Front Work Department since March 2018.

Government offices
Preceded by Ye Xiaowen	Director of the State Administration for Religious Affairs; 2009–2022	Succeeded by Cui Maohu
