= Marketing Dictatorship: Propaganda and Thought Work in Contemporary China =

2009 book by Anne-Marie Brady

- Author: Anne-Marie Brady
- Language: English
- Subject: Chinese politics; Propaganda; Political communication
- Genre: Non-fiction
- Published: 2009
- Publisher: Rowman & Littlefield
- Publication place: United States
- Media type: Print; e-book
- Pages: 248
- ISBN: 9780742540583

Marketing Dictatorship: Propaganda and Thought Work in Contemporary China is a 2009 book by political scientist Anne-Marie Brady. The book analyzes the evolution of propaganda within the Chinese Communist Party (CCP). Brady argues that the CCP has incorporated modern marketing techniques, digital technologies, and data-driven strategies into its system of ideological control. She characterizes this model as a "marketing dictatorship," where political authority is reinforced through propaganda and strategic communication.

== Background ==
Brady is a professor of political science and international relations at the University of Canterbury. Her research focuses on the CCP's domestic politics and foreign policy, as well as polar politics, Pacific politics, and New Zealand foreign policy. Her work has been cited in policy discussions in countries including the United States, New Zealand, Australia, the United Kingdom, Canada, and the European Union.

== Synopsis ==
In the book, Brady examines how the CCP has maintained and strengthened its political control in the reform era, focusing on the role of propaganda and "thought work" in sustaining authority while adapting to major socio-economic changes.

Brady argues that the CCP has transformed its propaganda system into a sophisticated, professionalized apparatus that blends traditional Leninist methods with modern marketing strategies. She writes that "Rather than the violent means of the past, the Party-State's legitimacy is now carefully manufactured through assiduous political public relations, and the modern forms of propaganda and thought work." The book describes how the CCP uses data analytics and audience segmentation to tailor messaging to specific groups, and integrates propaganda across state media, education, and digital platforms. The book also discusses how the CCP extends influence beyond China's borders through media, academia, and influence within diaspora communities.

According to Brady, new forms of social control and persuasion, and advances in propaganda technologies, "have made a major contribution toward creating the conditions for ongoing CCP rule in China." She concludes that "Party propagandists have succeeded in marketing dictatorship."

== Reception ==
The book has been reviewed in academic journals focusing on Chinese politics and communication.

China Perspectives described the book as a significant contribution to the study of Chinese propaganda and as groundbreaking in its examination of the institutionalization of propaganda practices, and its integration of communication strategies across social media. The review identified three weaknesses in the book: a lack of analysis of the reasons behind variations in propaganda content, an absence of a systematic explanation of its impact on public opinion, and a limited discussion of broader debates on authoritarian resilience. The China Journal's review discussed the book as an examination of the CCP's propaganda system and its role in governance in contemporary China.
