= He Chengxiang =

Chinese politician

- 何成湘

Director of the State Administration for Religious Affairs
- In office 1954–1961
- Premier: Zhou Enlai
- Preceded by: New title
- Succeeded by: Xiao Xianfa

Personal details
- Born: February 1900 Gong County, Sichuan, Qing China
- Died: July 23, 1967 (aged 67) Lanzhou, Gansu, People's Republic of China
- Party: Chinese Communist Party
- Parent: He Lizhong
- Education: Yibin No. 1 High School; Shanghai University

Chinese name
- Chinese: 何成湘
Transcriptions
Standard Mandarin
- Hanyu Pinyin: Hé Chéngxiāng

Guzhou
- Chinese: 鼓洲
Transcriptions
Standard Mandarin
- Hanyu Pinyin: Gǔzhōu

He Zhonghan
- Traditional Chinese: 何忠漢
- Simplified Chinese: 何忠汉
Transcriptions
Standard Mandarin
- Hanyu Pinyin: Hé Zhōnghàn

He Xiang
- Chinese: 何湘
Transcriptions
Standard Mandarin
- Hanyu Pinyin: Hé Xiāng

He Chengxiang (Chinese: 何成湘; February 1900 – 23 July 1967), courtesy name Guzhou (Chinese: 鼓洲), also known as He Zhonghan (Chinese: 何忠汉) and He Xiang (Chinese: 何湘), was a Chinese politician who served as director of the State Administration for Religious Affairs from 1954 to 1961.

== Biography ==
He was born in Gong County, Sichuan, in February 1900, to a landlord family. He was the fourth of nine children. His father He Lizhong (Chinese: 何礼中) was a merchant. In 1917 he attended the Xuzhou Unity High School (now Yibin No. 1 High School). In 1923 he was accepted to the Shanghai University, where he joined the Chinese Communist Party (CCP) in the next year.

In May 1925 he participated in the May Thirtieth Movement. In June 1926, he was proposed as secretary-general of the All-China Students' Federation (ACSF), a student organization under the leadership of the CCP. In the winter of 1926, he was appointed secretary-general of the Jiangsu and Zhejiang Provinces of the Communist Youth League. In March 1927 he was transferred to Wuhan, capital of Hubei province, as director of the Hubei Provincial Committee of the Communist Youth League. At the beginning of 1928, he was appointed secretary of Jiangsu Provincial Committee of the Communist Youth League. In June 1928 he was imprisoned in Longhua Prison. At the beginning of 1929, he was appointed secretary of Shunzhi Provincial Committee of the Communist Youth League. In September 1929, he was arrested by the Tianjin Gendarmerie Command. He was released in 1930. In 1931, he was sent to northeast China, where he was Chinese Communist Party Committee Secretary of Manzhou Province. In the spring of 1935, he became director of the CCP Organization Department. During the Second Sino-Japanese War, he worked in the Southern Bureau of the CCP Central Committee. During the Chinese Civil War, he was involved in the Chongqing negotiations.

After the establishment of the Communist State, he was appointed director of the State Administration for Religious Affairs. In 1961 he was transferred to northwest China's Gansu province, where he was vice-governor there.

In 1966, Mao Zedong launched the Cultural Revolution, Lin Biao and Kang Sheng slandered him as a "traitor". He was mistreated and tortured and then died in Lanzhou, capital of Gansu province, on September 23, 1967. He was rehabilitated in May 1979.

Government offices
| New title | Director of the State Administration for Religious Affairs; 1954–1961 | Succeeded by Xiao Xianfa |
