= Ye Xiaowen =

Chinese politician

- 叶小文
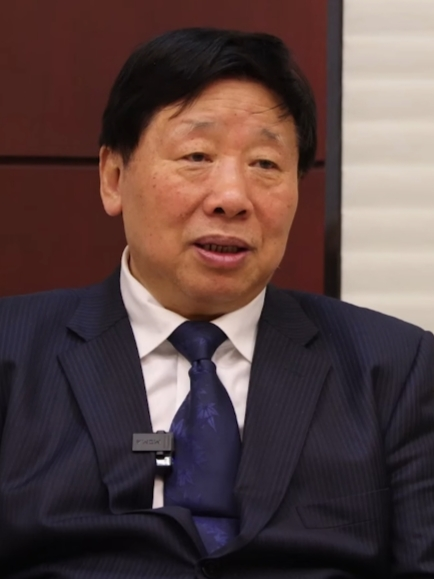

Director of the Bureau of Religious Affairs
- In office July 1995 – 1998
- Preceded by: Zhang Shengzuo

Director of the State Administration for Religious Affairs
- In office 1998–2009
- Succeeded by: Wang Zuo'an

Party Secretary of the Central Institute of Socialism
- In office 2009–2016
- Preceded by: Lou Zhihao
- Succeeded by: Pan Yue

Personal details
- Born: August 1950 (age 76) Ningxiang, Hunan, China
- Party: Chinese Communist Party
- Education: Guizhou Academy of Social Sciences
- Occupation: Politician

Ye Xiaowen (Chinese: 叶小文; pinyin: Yè Xiǎowén; born August 1950) is a Chinese politician who held various top posts relating to state regulation of religion in China from 1995 to 2009.

In 1995, Ye became the director of the Bureau of Religious Affairs under the State Council. At the beginning of his work in the Bureau, he held a view to minimize the influence of religion in the socialist China. There, he worked to prevent religious unrest, select the 11th Panchen Lama, and ban the controversial Falun Gong group. In 1998, the Bureau of Religious Affairs was renamed the State Administration for Religious Affairs, while Ye Xiaowen remained its director. He acknowledged presiding over religions in China, and changed policy to say that religion has a place in society, although he persecuted groups that he thought brought foreign control to Chinese churches, like the Roman Catholic Church. In 2007 he declared State Religious Affairs Bureau Order No. 5, which attempted to reduce the influence of the 14th Dalai Lama and other foreign groups on the reincarnations in Tibet. All the while, he traveled often to the United States to defend his religious policy against criticism. Ye was relieved of his religious post in September 2009 to direct the Central Institute of Socialism.

== Early life and career ==
Ye Xiaowen was born in 1950 to a teachers' family in Ningxiang County, Henan, although he grew up in Guizhou. He joined the Chinese Communist Party (CCP) in 1975. Ye was one of the few Chinese students to study sociology after the discipline was suppressed for 20 years, becoming vice director of the Guizhou Academy of Social Sciences. In 1985, after Hu Jintao was promoted to CCP committee secretary of Guizhou, he was made Secretary of the Guizhou Communist Youth League. As part of his mandate in 1992, he traveled to Northwest China to find out why some young people were religious, and to try to convert them to the Youth League instead. The reflective article he wrote earned him the attention of religious and CCP leaders in China.

The article criticized the CCP leadership as regarding religion as "backward and fatuous", and for simply hoping that young people would become atheists. It acknowledged that religion "has mass appeal and is going to be around for a long time", and that it is "compatible with a socialist society." He condemned the anti-religious excesses of the Cultural Revolution, and recommended that China loosen its grip on religion as part of the reform and opening up. On the other hand, Ye vindicates the CCP's suspicions about foreign missionaries in Europe's colonial past with China, and religion's role in overthrowing communist states in the Revolutions of 1989. Therefore, he argues, the state must stress "self-governance, self-support, and self-sufficiency" in Chinese religious organizations. This greatly influenced Chinese paramount leader Jiang Zemin's reformist attitudes on religion, which were attacked on both the CCP right and left for being too restrictive or not restrictive enough. Ye later reflected that he had to quote Karl Marx on religion in order for the CCP members to listen to his ideas.

== Bureau of Religious Affairs ==
In July 1995, Ye was appointed director of the Bureau of Religious Affairs under the State Council of the People's Republic of China. One of his first tasks was to make sure that the 1995 CCTV New Year's Gala contained nothing offensive to religious people. When he saw that 100 children were set to dance with lanterns shaped as pigs' heads (pigs are ritually unclean in Islam), and that it was too late to change the routine, he ordered China Central Television to take only long shots to obscure recognition. That same year, Ye presided over the enthronement of Gyaincain Norbu, the controversial government choice for the 11th Panchen Lama of Tibetan Buddhism.

The Ministry of Civil Affairs of the People's Republic of China banned the controversial Falun Gong belief system in July 1995. Ye gave a press conference three months later, accusing Falun Gong of being a doomsday cult, antiscientific, anti-medicine, of harassing people en masse, and of tax evasion. He insisted that the government had to act against Falun Gong on behalf of science, civilization, and human rights, although he promised that the police would not persecute people who practiced alone in their homes. Slavoj Žižek argues that Ye and the CCP banned Falun Gong not for their general antipathy towards religion, but for Falun Gong's insistence on "independence from state control", a commonality with Tibetan Buddhism.

== State Administration for Religious Affairs ==
=== Three-Self and Order No. 5 ===
The Bureau of Religious Affairs was renamed the State Administration for Religious Affairs in 1998, and Ye remained its director. Here he worked to implement the doctrine of the Three-Self Patriotic Movement, or Chinese churches' independence from foreign influence. In practice, this meant the attempted eradication of Chinese Catholicism loyal to Rome (which he considered "colonial") and not to the official Catholic Church in China. This crackdown was received poorly by international audiences, so he held a press conference in Los Angeles in 2003. He was received with hostility, but was said to have answered questions "like a tire salesman". When he was asked how he, as an atheist, could regulate religion in China, he replied, "In China, the director of sports does not play sports; the director of tobacco does not smoke; and the director of religious affairs does not believe in any religion". He said that the Protestant population in China has grown from 10 million in 1999, to 15 million in 2003 and further to 16 million in 2009.

In the same week in 2006 of the World Buddhist Forum, Ye Xiaowen "rejected decades of state ambivalence toward religion" by telling Xinhua News Agency that religion in general, and Buddhism in particular, has a "unique role in promoting a harmonious society", acknowledging the rapid revival of religiosity following China's economic reforms. In 2007, Ye announced State Religious Affairs Bureau Order No. 5, a regulation to take force in September about the reincarnation of living Buddhas in the Tibet Autonomous Region. It increased vetting of temples that handle reincarnations and affirms that reincarnations done without state approval were illegal. His administration then affirmed that the government would only intervene in religious issues "related to national and societal interests". Some interpreted this order as a renewed assertion of power to choose the next Dalai Lama. The current 14th Dalai Lama responded in an interview with a Japanese newspaper, threatening to break with tradition and choose his own successor while he was still living.

=== Olympics and unrest ===
In the runup to the 2008 Beijing Olympics in February, Ye Xiaowen traveled to the United States to address Bush administration concerns about Chinese religious policy. He met with Undersecretary of State Paula Dobriansky, ambassador for religious freedom John Hanford, and retired Archbishop of Washington Theodore McCarrick. He said that China respects religious belief, criticized the U.S. State Department's last annual report on religious freedom, and explained the muted response over the Dalai Lama's Congressional Gold Medal. There, he expressed hope for reconciliation with the Vatican, with whom the People's Republic does not currently have ties because it recognizes Taiwan.

After the 2008 Tibetan unrest, Ye published an opinion piece in a December edition of China Daily. Entitled, "Shangri-La has changed and Tibetans know it", he criticized those who thought themselves "'experts' [about Tibet] after reading a mere handful of texts". Quoting from Lost Horizon, the work that introduced the concept of Shangri-La, he said that Tibet would only become "an everlasting peaceful land" if separatist agitation were quashed and all ethnic groups in Tibet developed equally.

== Central Institute of Socialism ==
Ye was promoted in September 2009 to the Secretary of the CCP committee at the Central Institute of Socialism, replacing Lou Zhihao. Former Deputy Director Wang Zuo'an was promoted to Director, a routine move that is not expected to effect changes in policy. The Catholic Church-affiliated Asia News was especially critical of Ye's legacy, calling him "a perfect representative of the idea that religions should be subservient to the power and supremacy of the Party".

Political offices
Preceded by Zhang Shengzuo	Director of the Bureau of Religious Affairs; 1995–1998	Succeeded by Post abolished
Preceded by Post created	Director of the State Administration for Religious Affairs; 1998–2009	Succeeded by Wang Zuo'an
Party political offices
Preceded by Lou Zhihao	Party Secretary of the Central Institute of Socialism; 2009–2016	Succeeded by Pan Yue
