= Institute for China-America Studies =

China-funded think tank in Washington, D.C.

- Abbreviation: ICAS
- Formation: 2015; 11 years ago
- Type: 501(c)(3) organization
- Tax ID no.: 46-4867689
- Headquarters: Washington, D.C.
- Executive director: Nong Hong
- Affiliations: Ministry of Foreign Affairs of the People's Republic of China
- Website: chinaus-icas.org

The Institute for China-America Studies (ICAS) is a Washington, D.C.-based think tank affiliated with and funded by the government of the People's Republic of China as part of the Chinese Communist Party's united front global influence operations.

Founded in 2015, ICAS receives most of its funding from the Hainan Nanhai Research Foundation, which is sponsored in-turn by the National Institute for South China Sea Studies, a Chinese Ministry of Foreign Affairs-funded research institute based in Haikou, China. ICAS receives additional funding from the China Institute of the University of Alberta, Nanjing University, and Wuhan University.

ICAS was the first think tank launched by the government of the People's Republic of China overseas. It was formed in response to General Secretary of the Chinese Communist Party (CCP) Xi Jinping's call for CCP supporters to establish a presence in the United States to "go global" to "advance the Chinese narrative." ICAS is led by academic Nong Hong.

ICAS is known for its support of China's aggressive territorial claims in the South China Sea. Its efforts have been described as "a channel for propaganda" skewed towards the policies of the PRC government.

== Reception ==
A U.S. government report from the United States–China Economic and Security Review Commission described ICAS as an attempt by the CCP to "directly inject its own voice into policy discussions" as "part of a campaign to introduce Beijing’s views on its territorial claims in the South China Sea to Washington."

Foreign Policy reported that despite its significant funding, ICAS struggles to gain credibility and attention in the U.S. due to its alignment with Beijing's views and lack of aggressive engagement and sophisticated operations within the think tank ecosystem. It is viewed as part of China's multi-pronged strategy to force its will in the South China Sea against international law and as a mouthpiece for the CCP.

== See also ==
- United front (China)
