= Chen Ruifeng =

Chinese politician

- 陈瑞峰

Director of the National Religious Affairs Administration
- Incumbent
- Assumed office 20 March 2023
- Preceded by: Cui Maohu

Personal details
- Born: May 1966 (age 60) Qingdao, Shandong, China
- Party: Chinese Communist Party
- Education: Qingdao Normal School; Qufu Normal University; Peking University

Chinese name
- Simplified Chinese: 陈瑞峰
- Traditional Chinese: 陳瑞峰
Transcriptions
Standard Mandarin
- Hanyu Pinyin: Chén Ruìfēng

Chen Ruifeng (Chinese: 陈瑞峰; born May 1966) is a Chinese politician who is the current director of the National Religious Affairs Administration and deputy head of the United Front Work Department, in office since March 2023.

Chen is a representative of the 20th National Congress of the Chinese Communist Party and an alternate of the 20th Central Committee of the Chinese Communist Party.

== Early life and education ==
Chen was born in Qingdao, Shandong, in May 1966. In 1983, he entered Qingdao Normal School, where he majored in political history. He transferred to the Department of Politics, Qufu Normal University two years later. He went to receive his master's degree from the Department of Political Science and Administration, Peking University in 1990. He joined the Chinese Communist Party (CCP) in April 1989, upon graduation.

== Career ==
After graduating in January 1990, Chen became an official in the Publicity Department of the CCP Beijing Computer Second Factory Committee.

In November 1990, Chen was despatched to the Party Member Education Department of the Propaganda Bureau of the Publicity Department of the Chinese Communist Party, and finally became director in July 2014.

Chen was appointed deputy party secretary of Wuhan in August 2016, concurrently serving as president of the Party School, secretary of the Political and Legal Affairs Commission, vice mayor, and secretary of the Wuhan Changjiang New City Working Committee. He was party secretary of Suizhou in November 2018, in addition to serving as chairman of Suizhou Municipal People's Congress.

Chen was appointed head of the Publicity Department of Qinghai Provincial Committee of the Chinese Communist Party in July 2020 and was admitted to member of the CCP Qinghai Provincial Committee, the province's top authority. In January 2021, he was chosen as party secretary of the capital city Xining, secretary of the Party Working Committee of Xining (National) Economic and Technological Development Zone, and secretary of the Party Working Committee of Qinghai National High-tech Industrial Development Zone.

In March 2023, Chen was transferred back to Beijing to succeed Cui Maohu as director of the National Religious Affairs Administration and deputy head of the United Front Work Department.

Government offices
Preceded by Long Zhengcai	Executive Vice Mayor of Wuhan Municipal People's Government; 2017–2018	Succeeded by Hu Yabo
Preceded by Cui Maohu	Director of the National Religious Affairs Administration; 2023–present	Incumbent
Party political offices
Preceded by Jing Huimin	Director of the Propaganda and Education Bureau of the Publicity Department of the Chinese Communist Party; 2014–2016	Succeeded by Chang Bo
Preceded by Chen Anli	Communist Party Secretary of Suizhou; 2018–2020	Succeeded by Qian Yuankun
Preceded by Zhang Ximing	Head of the Publicity Department of Qinghai Provincial Committee of the Chinese Communist Party; 2020–2021	Succeeded by Zhao Yuexia
Preceded by Wang Xiao	Communist Party Secretary of Xi'ning; 2021–2023	Succeeded by Wang Weidong
