= Li Yang (biologist) =

American biologist

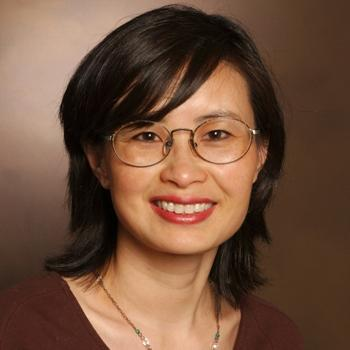
- Education: Vanderbilt University
- Scientific career
- Fields: Cancer biology
- Workplaces: National Cancer Institute
- Doctoral advisor: David Carbone

Li Yang is an American biologist researching how inflammation in the premetastatic environment modifies cancer cell colonization. She is a senior investigator and head of the tumor microenvironment section at the National Cancer Institute.

== Education ==
Yang received a Ph.D. in the Department of Cancer Biology at Vanderbilt University, under the mentorship of David Carbone. Her dissertation research focused on COX-2 pathway in tumor progression, immunosuppression, and the contribution of host myeloid cells to tumor blood vessel formation. She investigated TGF-β regulation of inflammation and tumor microenvironment as a postdoctoral researcher research with Harold L. Moses.

== Career and research ==
Yang joined the National Cancer Institute (NCI) in 2009 and was tenured in 2016. She a senior investigator with a research program devoted to understanding the molecular mechanisms underlying tumor-stroma interaction during metastatic process. Her studies demonstrate that cancer-associated inflammation is critical in the functional switch of TGF-β from a suppressor to a promoter. Her team is currently investigating how myeloid-specific TGF-β signaling modulates host inflammation/immune response in cancer and other pathological conditions.

As head of the tumor microenvironment Section, Yang is interested in how inflammation in the premetastatic environment modifies cancer cell colonization. Her research approaches include cellular and molecular biology, cancer biology, immunology, as well as integrated genomic-wide genetic and epigenetic approaches.

== Awards and honors ==
Yang is a recipient of the Federal Technology Transfer Award, co-recipient of FLEX Program Awards for Principal Investigators, CCR, NCI, as well as U.S.-China Biomedical Collaborative Research Grant award.
