= Qufu Normal University =

Public University in Rizhao, China

- 曲阜师范大学 (Chinese)
- Motto: 学而不厌，诲人不倦
- Motto in English: Insatiable in learning, tireless in teaching
- Type: Public
- Established: 1955
- President: Qi Wanxue (戚万学)
- Vice-president: Kang Shumin (康淑敏）
- Academic staff: 2,350
- Undergraduates: 32,502
- Postgraduates: 3,514
- Location: Qufu and Rizhao, Shandong, China
- Nickname: Qushida (曲师大)
- Website: www.qfnu.edu.cn

Chinese name
- Simplified Chinese: 曲阜师范大学
- Traditional Chinese: 曲阜師範大學
Transcriptions
Standard Mandarin
- Hanyu Pinyin: Qūfù Shīfàn Dàxué

Qufu Normal University (Chinese: 曲阜师范大学) is a public university located in the cities of Qufu, which is the ancient home of Confucius, and in Rizhao, Shandong province, China. Its focal points include studies of history, calligraphy, law, management, chemistry, physics and the general education of teachers.

== History ==
The history of the university dates to 1955, when Shandong Teachers College (山东师范专科学校) was founded in Jinan. In September 1956 the institution moved to Qufu, renaming itself Qufu Teachers College (曲阜师范学院). In 1970 it was absorbed into Shandong University and, after four years, the college became was again revived as Qufu Teachers College. The current name was adopted along with the university status in 1985. The Rizhao Campus was founded in 2002. In 2017, the university graduated its first foreign student with a bachelor's degree in physical education.

== Administration ==
The faculties are split between the two campuses, with both having a share in both social and technical sciences. Western languages are taught in Qufu, while Rizhao hosts the Asian languages, with English majors available at both locations. The university offers five first level and 31 second level doctoral programs, 22 first level and 115 second level master programs and 84 undergraduate programs including arts, science and engineering and law. There are 28 colleges or departments.

The university covers 3061 acres, the total assets is 1.312 billion yuan, of which teaching and research equipment worth 239 million yuan.

=== Faculties in Qufu ===
- College of Liberal Arts
- College of History and Culture
- College of Foreign Languages
- College of Pedagogy
- School of Vocational and Continuing Education
- College of Mathematics and Science
- College of Physics and Engineering
- School of Chemistry and Chemical Engineering
- College of Life Sciences
- School of Sports Science
- Calligraphy Department
- School of Marxism
- International Exchange College

=== Faculties in Rizhao ===
- College of Politics and Public Administration
- School of Economics
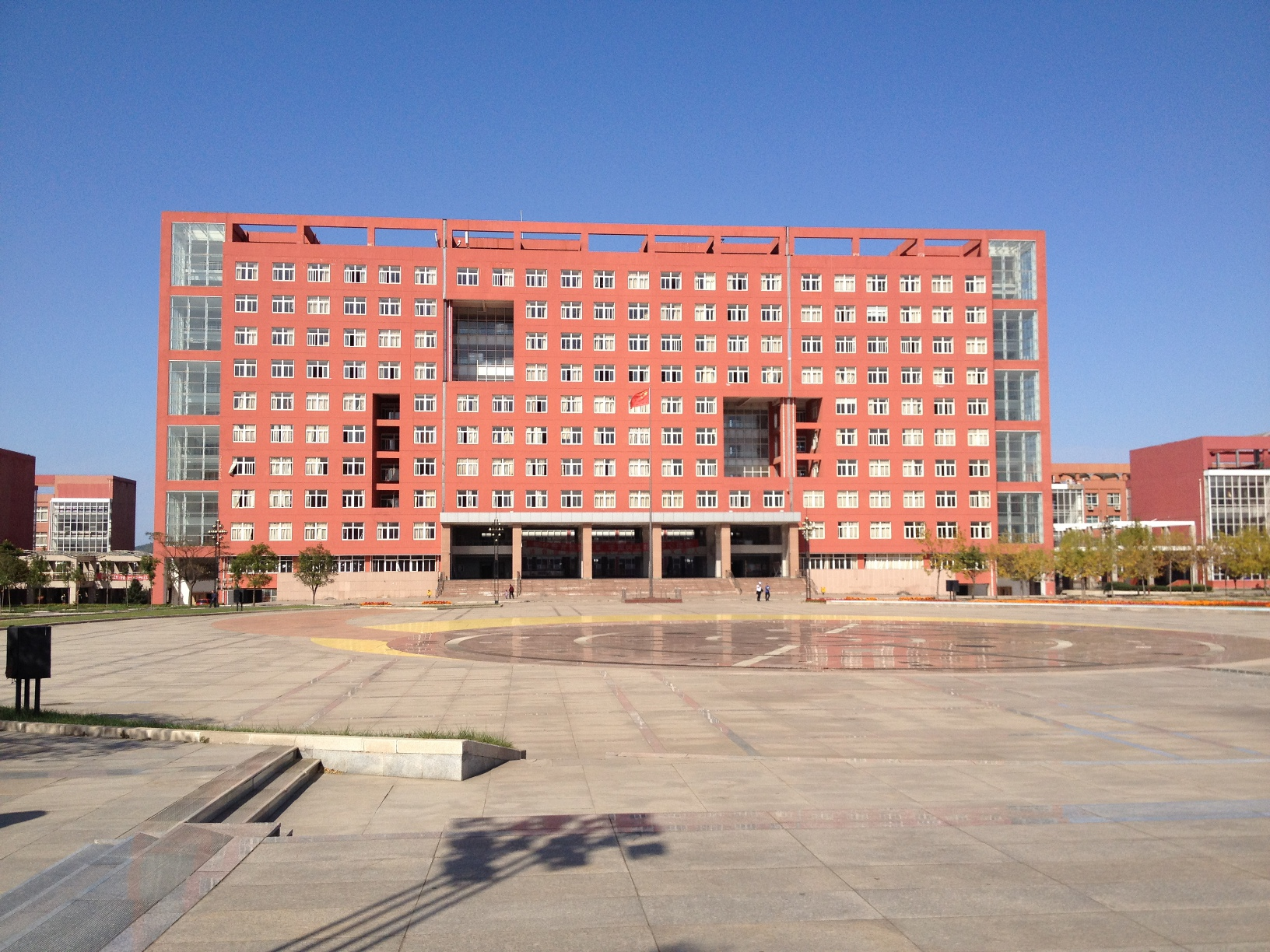
- Main square and teaching building on the Rizhao Campus
  Law School
- School of Information Science and Engineering
- College of Geography
- College of Translation Studies
- College of Engineering
- Academy of Fine Arts
- School of Statistics
- School of Communication
- School of Software Engineering
- College of Music
- School of Management
