= Non-Party intellectuals =

Chinese Communist Party term

- Simplified Chinese: 党外知识分子
Transcriptions

Non-Party intellectuals is a political term of the Chinese Communist Party (CCP), referring to intellectuals who are not members of the CCP, yet are useful to the party in its united front work.

== Background ==
Non-CCP intellectuals are one of the targets of the CCP's united front work, while intellectuals belonging to the party are subject to the constraints of the Constitution of the Chinese Communist Party. Non-CCP intellectuals mainly include intellectuals from the eight minor and non-oppositional "democratic parties," the federations of industry and commerce, and intellectuals without any party affiliation. The CCP's united front work with such intellectuals can be traced back to before the founding of the People's Republic of China.

== Work ==
The work of non-CCP intellectuals mainly includes work in state organs, universities, research institutes, state-owned enterprises and other state-owned enterprises and institutions, new economic organizations and new social organizations (including work with new media practitioners), and the work of overseas and returned overseas students.

The CCP committees of all universities in the People's Republic of China have established United Front Work Departments. The methods of united front work for non-CCP intellectuals include:

- Solicit opinions from non-CCP intellectuals through briefings, soliciting opinions on major issues, and holding forums
- Invite non-CCP intellectuals to attend school meetings and read documents
- School leaders should maintain regular contact with non-CCP intellectuals

The CCP committees of various universities also undertake the responsibility of providing “ideological and political guidance” to such intellectuals. For example, they organize non-CCP intellectuals to systematically study "socialism with Chinese characteristics" through various forms such as training courses, tutoring reports, and seminars.

== See also ==
- New social strata
