= Anne-Marie Brady =

New Zealand academic (born 1966)

Anne-Marie Brady FRSNZ
- Born: Anne-Marie Sharon Brady; 1966 (age 59–60)
- Education: Australian National University
- Awards: Fellow of the Royal Society of New Zealand
- Scientific career
- Fields: Chinese politics Antarctic politics New Zealand Foreign policy Pacific politics
- Workplaces: Canterbury University
- Thesis: Making the Foreign Serve China: Managing Foreigners in the People's Republic of China (2000)

Anne-Marie Sharon Brady FRSNZ (born 1966) is a New Zealand academic and Professor of Political Science at the University of Canterbury. She specialises in Chinese domestic and foreign politics, Antarctic and Arctic politics, Pacific politics, and New Zealand Foreign Policy.

Brady is the first female political scientist to be elected a Fellow of The Royal Society of New Zealand, Te Apārangi.

Her research on Antarctic politics, China's polar interests, and the Chinese Communist Party's domestic and foreign policy, in particular, foreign interference activities, has been a catalyst contributing to policy adjustments by governments of the US, to New Zealand, Australia, the UK, Canada, and the EU.

== Education ==
Brady earned her Bachelor's of Arts (B.A.) in Chinese and Political Studies from the University of Auckland in 1989. She then earned her Masters of Asian Studies; Chinese and Political Studies with First Class Honours at the University of Auckland in 1994. She earned a Doctor of Philosophy (Ph.D.) in East Asian Studies: International Relations at the Australian National University in 2000 with a thesis titled Making the foreign serve China: managing foreigners in the People's Republic of China. In 2009, Brady earned a Post-Graduate Certificate in Antarctic Studies with Distinction at the University of Canterbury. Brady is fluent in Mandarin Chinese.

== Academic career ==
In 2001, Brady joined the College of Arts, Department of Political Science and International Relations, at the University of Canterbury. Brady later became a professor of Political Science at the same University. She taught both undergraduate and graduate courses, as well as providing graduate supervision on: Chinese politics, East Asian politics, Polar politics, China and the South Pacific as well as New Zealand foreign policy.

Brady is the founding and executive Editor of The Polar Journal, published by Taylor & Francis.

=== Fellowships ===
- Global Fellow with the Kissinger Institute on China and the United States’ Polar Initiative at the Woodrow Wilson Center, a think tank in Washington, D.C.
- Senior Fellow at the Australian Strategic Policy Institute, a defence and strategic policy think tank based in Canberra.
- Non-resident Senior Fellow at the China Policy Institute at the University of Nottingham in the UK,
- Member of the Council for Security Cooperation in the Asia Pacific (CSCAP).
- Member of the World Economic Forum's Global Action Council on the Arctic, 2014 - 2016.

=== Awards and honours ===
In 2019, Brady was made a fellow of the Royal Society of New Zealand Te Apārangi for her contribution towards the advancement of the humanities. She is the first female political scientist elected a Fellow of Royal Society Te Apārangi. Being made a Fellow is an honour that recognises distinction in research, scholarship or the advancement of knowledge at the highest international standards. The citation read:

...The research of Anne-Marie Brady on Antarctic politics, China's polar interests, and the Chinese Communist Party's domestic and foreign policy, in particular, foreign interference activities, has been a catalyst contributing to policy adjustments by governments from the USA, to New Zealand, Australia, the UK, Canada, and the EU. Her research has been publicly praised by Hillary Clinton and Marco Rubio. Her testimony on Antarctica and China is recorded in Hansard in the Australian Parliament, as well as in several reports on Antarctica prepared for the Australian government. Her policy advice helped spark an inquiry into foreign interference in the New Zealand parliament. Her research on small states in the changing global order has assisted New Zealand and other small state governments with contestable policy advice. She founded a groundbreaking journal of polar social sciences, which offers policy relevant research on the Arctic and Antarctic....

Also in 2019, Brady was awarded the New Zealand Women of Influence Global Influence Award, to mark her contribution towards placing the spotlight on the issue of Chinese influence in the South Pacific. The citation read:

...Anne-Marie’s ground-breaking research into China's covert foreign influence strategy in New Zealand has had global reach and impact since its first publication in 2017. Her research was cited in an expert submission to the Australian Parliamentary Joint Committee on Intelligence and Security in 2018, and in May this year she gave expert testimony before the New Zealand Justice Select Committee. The judges praised Anne-Marie for putting the spotlight on the important geo-political issue of Chinese influence in the South Pacific...

=== Allegations of Chinese Communist Party influence in New Zealand ===
In September 2017, Brady presented a conference paper Magic Weapons: China's political influence activities under Xi Jinping detailing the Chinese Communist Party's attempts to influence international opinion using New Zealand as a case study. Brady's paper argued that the Chinese government was working with Chinese diaspora community organisations and ethnic Chinese media as part of a united front strategy to advance Chinese political and economic interests in New Zealand. Chinese Communist Party (CCP) influence in New Zealand included working with diaspora organisations and local media to cultivate relationships with New Zealand business and politicians from the country's two major parties, National and Labour.

In late 2017, she claimed to have become the target of a campaign of intimidation. A number of related properties were burgled, including her university office and home. As of September 2018, progress was being made in the investigation and Interpol were involved. In December 2018, 303 academics, think-tankers, journalists, human-rights activists, politicians signed an open letter that was published on the Czech academic website Sinopsis condemning the harassment campaign against Brady and urging the New Zealand Government to protect her so she could continue her research.

In mid-February 2019, it was reported that the police investigation into the burglary and other incidents had concluded as unresolved. While an ABC's Four Corners documentary claimed that "Australian intelligence agencies have identified China's spy service as the prime suspect behind the intimidation of University of Canterbury Professor Anne-Marie Brady," Prime Minister Jacinda Ardern responded in April 2019 that she had seen "nothing - no evidence - to support the claims that were made in that story".

On 8 March 2019, it was reported that Brady had been blocked from submitting evidence to the New Zealand Parliament's justice select committee examining potential foreign influence in the New Zealand elections. The four Labour members of the justice select committee, including former chair Raymond Huo, had decided to exclude Brady on "procedural grounds" that her testimony had passed the deadline; Huo had been named as a pro-CCP influencer in Brady's "Magic Weapons" paper. Their action was criticised by the opposition National Party including electoral reform spokesperson Nick Smith. In response to media coverage and criticism from the National Party, the Labour Party announced that Huo had reversed his earlier decision and extended an invitation for Brady to speak to select committee members.

In March 2021, Brady claimed that a New Zealander who had been exposed by the New Zealand Security Intelligence Service for gathering information on behalf of an unidentified foreign intelligence agency about New Zealand–based dissidents had been working for China. Brady claimed that the CCP targeted the Chinese diaspora since it feared that they could "nurture and support political change in China" and in order to influence foreign societies.

In June 2021, Brady and two other academics said that they suspect that the Chinese government were spying on their lectures, by sending students to attend, photograph and film lectures. The Chinese Embassy dismissed these claims, and the Minister for Education Chris Hipkins advised universities and lecturers to inform the New Zealand Security Intelligence Service if they have any concerns about espionage in their lecture halls.

Brady's Twitter account was temporarily suspended as a result of her tweets that made fun of Xi Jinping and the lack of international positive reaction to the 100th Anniversary of the Chinese Communist Party. She had suggested in one tweet that an alternative headline for a news article about the celebrations: “Xi: its my Party and I’ll cry if I want to”. A Times journalist said that the block was probably an algorithmic response to a number of complaints from CCP agents that would have been received by Twitter. Her account was subsequently restored.

=== Controversy over standards of scholarship ===
In 2020, Brady's research paper A Pen in One Hand, Gripping a Gun in the Other was submitted as evidence of CCP influence campaigns to the New Zealand Parliament's justice select committee. Despite being protected by Parliamentary privilege, the paper drew a formal complaint from the University of Auckland and Victoria University of Wellington stating that it is "inflammatory, inaccurate and unprofessional". They alleged "...manifest errors of fact and misleading inferences..." and "... unsubstantiated assertions and outright falsehoods constitute a serious breach in accepted standards of scholarship." Brady's employer, the University of Canterbury, launched a formal review of the paper in August 2020.

In response, numerous international scholars signed a public letter to Cheryl de la Rey, Vice-Chancellor of the University of Canterbury, criticising the review of Brady's scholarship as being without merit and a threat to academic freedom.

In mid-December 2020, two external reviewers brought in by the University of Canterbury dismissed the complaints against Brady and her co-authors, stating that they met the responsibilities of the university's policy and the Education Act 1989. The examiners also observed that Brady's work was based on a lengthy period of research and cited extensively from other sources. Brady welcomed the dismissal of the complaints and called for the University of Canterbury to dismiss the "gagging order" against her.

== Views and positions ==
=== New Zealand's trade with China ===
In early July 2021, Brady urged New Zealand to diversify its foreign and trade policies at the 55th University of Otago Foreign Policy School in Dunedin. Brady expressed concern about the country's trade dependence on China, stating that "New Zealand is strategically dependent on China and its imports for 530 categories of goods and 144 have applications in critical national infrastructure." She urged the New Zealand Government to use the COVID-19 pandemic as an opportunity to diversify its international trade.

=== China-Solomon Islands security agreement ===
In reference to China's security agreement with the Solomon Islands, signed in April 2022, Brady called the Solomon Islands a "failed state" governed by a "corrupt elite", and that New Zealand "could be cut off and encircled" by the People's Liberation Army Navy.

=== 2025 Chinese naval exercises in the Tasman ===
On 23 February 2025, Brady said that Chinese naval exercises in the Tasman Sea showed that China intended to establish a permanent military presence in the Pacific. She urged New Zealand to do more to defend itself and the Pacific.

== Personal life ==
Brady grew up in a not well off West Auckland family in the 1970s. She said she did not put much effort into school.

Brady met her husband when at a Beijing university in the mid-1990s; he was a member of the avant-guard Yuanmingyuan artists' colony which was eventually razed to the ground. They have three children.

== Selected works ==
- Brady, Anne-Marie (2003). Making the foreign serve China: managing foreigners in the People's Republic. Rowman & Littlefield.
- — (2006). "Guiding hand: The role of the CCP Central Propaganda Department in the current era". Westminster Papers in Communication and Culture. 3 (1): 58–77. doi:10.16997/wpcc.15.
- — (2009). Marketing Dictatorship: Propaganda and Thought Work in Contemporary China. Rowman & Littlefield.
- — (2009). "The Beijing Olympics as a campaign of mass distraction". The China Quarterly. 197: 1–24. doi:10.1017/S0305741009000058. S2CID 154773897.
- — (2009). "Mass persuasion as a means of legitimation and China's popular authoritarianism". American Behavioral Scientist. 53 (3): 434–457. doi:10.1177/0002764209338802. S2CID 144583407.
- — (2017). Magic Weapons: China's Political Influence Activities Under Xi Jinping (PDF). Clingendael Institute.
- — (2018). "Exploit Every Rift: United Front Work Goes Global" (PDF). Party Watch. Center for Advanced China Research.
- — (2018). "New Zealand and the CCP's 'magic weapons'". Journal of Democracy. 29 (2): 68–75. doi:10.1353/jod.2018.0026. S2CID 158908548.
- — (2020). Holding a Pen in One Hand, Gripping a Gun in the Other. Wilson Center.
