= Li Yang (footballer, born 1999) =

Chinese association football player

Personal information
- Date of birth: 7 May 1999 (age 27)
- Height: 1.78 m (5 ft 10 in)
- Position: Midfielder

Team information
- Current team: Meizhou Hakka
- Number: 45

Youth career
- –2017: Dalian Pro
- 2019–2020: Meizhou Hakka

Senior career*
Years	Team	Apps	(Gls)
2020–	Meizhou Hakka	0	(0)
- * Club domestic league appearances and goals as of 14:01, 26 July 2021 (UTC)

Li Yang (Chinese: 李洋; born 7 May 1999) is a Chinese footballer currently playing as a midfielder for Meizhou Hakka.

== Career statistics ==
=== Club ===
As of 25 July 2021.

Club	Season	League			Cup		Continental		Other		Total	
Club	Season	Division	Apps	Goals	Apps	Goals	Apps	Goals	Apps	Goals	Apps	Goals
Meizhou Hakka	2020	China League One	0	0	1 (Note: Appearances in the Chinese FA Cup)	0	–		0	0	1	0
Meizhou Hakka	2021	China League One	0	0	0	0	–		0	0	0	0
Career total			0	0	1	0	0	0	0	0	1	0
