= Li "Cindy" Yang =

Chinese-American businesswoman

Li "Cindy" Yang (Chinese: 楊蒞; pinyin: Yáng Lì; born 1973 or 1974) is a Chinese-American businesswoman known for founding an enterprise of massage parlors in Florida, including one sold by Yang in 2013 where New England Patriots owner Robert Kraft later allegedly received illegal sexual services. After becoming successful in the massage parlor business, Yang became involved in politics, allegedly selling access to President Donald Trump to Chinese businessmen at Trump's Mar-a-Lago resort, resulting in Democratic calls for an investigation of her activities.

== Early life and business success ==
Yang was born in China, and moved to the United States sometime between 1999 and 2003, eventually becoming a naturalized U.S. citizen. Her accent "is reportedly difficult to understand for some first meeting her". At one point, she was a journalist for "a Chinese-language television network covering Silicon Valley". She chose the English name "Cindy" because she liked Cindy Crawford.

In 2007, Yang, along with members of her family, opened the first of a chain of Asian massage parlors (employing only Asian female masseuses) in Palm Beach County and Broward County, Florida, primarily branded as Tokyo Day Spa locations. The enterprise grew to include "at least six day spas as well as a massage school and several nail salons", with one massage parlor being a location in Jupiter, Florida that Yang sold in 2013, and which would thereafter become the Orchids of Asia spa. The Miami Herald reported that these businesses had a reputation for illegally offering sexual services while still owned by Yang, but she denied knowledge of this. One spa operated by Yang in Broward County was allegedly unlicensed, and ceased operations in February 2019; Yang was sued by the landlord of the property on the claim that "Yang broke her five-year lease when she shut down the spa and stopped paying rent" at that time.

== Political activities ==
Yang appeared to be uninvolved with politics prior to 2015, when she "made some small donations" to the presidential campaign of Jeb Bush. She attended the 2016 Republican National Convention, and in 2017 attended the inauguration of Donald Trump, and began both attending fundraising events and raising funds for Trump. As of 2019, it was reported that Yang and family members "have donated almost $60,000 to the Trump campaign and the Trump Victory super-PAC". In December 2017, Yang arranged for two Chinese tech executives, Ryan Xu and Lucas Lu, to be photographed with Trump at a Republican National Committee (RNC) event in New York City where such photographs cost 50,000 dollars each. In February 2018, Yang attended an event at the White House for Trump's Asian American and Pacific Islander Initiative.

In February 2019, Yang attended and was photographed at Trump's Super Bowl Party at Mar-A-Lago. As of March 2019, Yang's company was promoting a Mar-a-Lago event for "Chinese elites" to meet Trump's sister, Elizabeth Trump Grau and members of Congress. Yang has frequently sought to be photographed with Republican Party figures, and has been photographed with President Donald Trump, his sons Eric Trump, and Donald Trump Jr., U.S Representatives Matt Gaetz and Brian Mast, White House staffer Kellyanne Conway, former vice presidential candidate Sarah Palin, Florida Governor Ron DeSantis, former Governor and later Senator Rick Scott, Secretary of Transportation Elaine Chao, and Florida Agriculture Commissioner Adam Putnam.

Mother Jones reported that Yang was also an officer in Florida branches of the (American) Chinese Association of Science and Technology and the Council for the Promotion of the Peaceful Reunification of China (CPPRC), which advocates for People's Republic of China control of Taiwan (the Republic of China), both groups described in the report as having "ties to China's Communist government". Yang was reported as having been a Vice President of the CPPRC chapter. Yang also had a position with the National Committee of Asian American Republicans, from which she was fired in March 2019, "following a report by the Miami Herald detailing Yang's connections with the White House". On March 21, 2019, it was reported that the Florida CPPRC has dissolved.

On March 12, 2019, the White House released a statement asserting that Trump "doesn't know" Yang. On March 14, 2019, Yang's attorney issued a denial of the assertion that Yang was selling access to Trump. Yang echoed the position of the White House in an interview on NBC News on March 20, 2019, saying that she also doesn't know Trump.

On March 15, Democratic members of the U.S. House and Senate asked the FBI to investigate the relationship between Yang and Trump.

Dr. Charles Lee is an associate of Yang. Yujing Zhang, who was arrested on March 30, 2019 trying to enter Mar-a-Lago, paid to attend a Yang-promoted Chinese-language social media event.

Zhonggang "Cliff" Li, an associate of Yang, is the executive director of the National Committee of Asian American Republicans, a registered political committee, which hosted the 2017 Asian Pacific American Presidential Inaugural Gala at the Mayflower Hotel.

In May 2019, it was reported that the FBI had opened an investigation into Yang to determine whether she had illegally funneled foreign money into President Trump's re-election effort. During the last week of May 2019, subpoenas were issued to Mar-a-Lago and the Trump Victory Committee for documents and records.

In September 2022, the Miami Herald reported that Republican members of the Federal Election Commission had blocked an investigation into Yang's campaign contributions, "despite a staff finding that laws likely were broken".

== See also ==
- Donald Trump 2020 presidential campaign
