= National Religious Affairs Administration =

Executive agency in China (1951–2018)

- 国家宗教事务局
- Old Logo of the NRAA

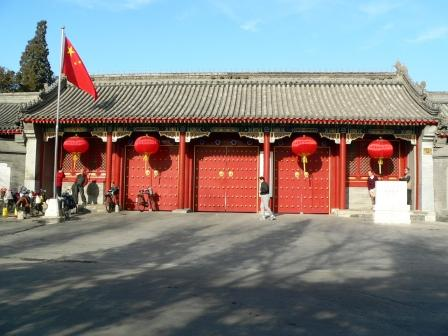

Department overview
- Jurisdiction: China
- Status: External name of the United Front Work Department; State Administration of the State Council (historical)
- Headquarters: Prince Chun Mansion, 44 Houhai Beiyan, Xicheng District, Beijing
- Department executive: Chen Ruifeng, Director
- Parent department: United Front Work Department
- Website: www.sara.gov.cn

National Religious Affairs Administration
- Traditional Chinese: 國家宗教事務局
- Simplified Chinese: 国家宗教事务局
Transcriptions
Standard Mandarin
- Hanyu Pinyin: Guójiā Zōngjiào Shìwù Jú

The National Religious Affairs Administration (NRAA), formerly the State Administration for Religious Affairs (SARA), is an external name of the United Front Work Department of the Central Committee of the Chinese Communist Party (CCP).

In 1954, the Religious Affairs Bureau was established. It was abolished in 1975 amidst the Cultural Revolution. It was re-established in 1979 and was renamed to the State Administration for Religious Affairs in 1998. Formerly, SARA was an executive agency directly under the State Council of the People's Republic of China which oversaw religious affairs in the country. In 2018, during a series of institutional reforms, the agency and its functions were merged into the United Front Work Department. The names of the former agency were retained by the United Front Work Department as external names under the system called "one institution with two names".

== History ==
Originally created in 1951 as the Religious Affairs Bureau (RAB), the State Administration for Religious Affairs was closely connected with the United Front Work Department (UFWD) and charged with overseeing the operations of China's five officially sanctioned religious organizations:

- Buddhist Association of China
- Chinese Taoist Association
- Islamic Association of China
- Three-Self Patriotic Movement (Protestant)
- Chinese Catholic Patriotic Association

Under the direction of the UFWD, the RAB was a body with which all religious groups in China had to register in order to obtain their legal status.

Xiao Xianfa directed the RAB from 1961 to 1965. The RAB was criticized during the Cultural Revolution. It was abolished in 1975.

In April 1979, the RAB was re-established with Xiao back as its director. RAB's responsibilities were "to protect the freedom of religious beliefs of Chinese citizens as required by law, safeguard the legitimate rights and interests of religious groups and the venues of their activities, ensure the religious leaders can conduct regular religious activities, and ensure citizens who wish to do so can take part in regular religious activities" and to "prevent and curb illegal, irregular, and illegitimate activities under the guise of religion."

In 1998, the RAB was re-established as the State Administration for Religious Affairs (SARA). SARA was established to oversee religious appointments, the selection of clergy, and the interpretation of religious doctrine. State Administration for Religious Affairs was also meant to ensure that the registered religious organizations support and carry out the policy priorities of the CCP. For instance, SARA has maintained a "living Buddha database" to track prominent Tibetan Buddhists who are loyal to the CCP.

Ye Xiaowen directed the SARA from 1995 to 2009. During his tenure, he issued the State Religious Affairs Bureau Order No. 5, which furthered state control over reincarnations in Tibetan Buddhism, and attempted to suppress underground Catholics loyal to Rome (which he considered "colonial") and not to the government-sanctioned Chinese Catholic Patriotic Association. After Ye was promoted to the Secretary of the CCP Committee at the Central Institute of Socialism, the former Deputy Director Wang Zuo'an was promoted to Director. In 2018, that NRAA was merged into the UFWD as part of a series of institutional reforms.

== Leadership ==
=== Directors ===
==== Religious Issues Research Group of the Cultural and Educational Committee of the State Council ====
Name	Chinese name	Took office	Left office	Ref.
Shao Quanlin	邵荃麟	August 1950	January 1951	

==== Religious Affairs Department of the Cultural and Educational Committee of the State Council ====
Name	Chinese name	Took office	Left office	Ref.
He Chengxiang	何成湘	January 1951	1954	

==== Religious Affairs Bureau ====
Name	Chinese name	Took office	Left office	Ref.
He Chengxiang	何成湘	1954	March 1961	
Xiao Xianfa	萧贤法	March 1961	1975	
Bureau Disestablished		1975	1979	
Xiao Xianfa	萧贤法	April 1979	18 August 1981	
Qiao Liansheng	乔连升	1982	1983	
Ren Wuzhi	任务之	1983	1992	
Zhang Shengzuo	张声作	1992	1995	
Ye Xiaowen	叶小文	May 1995	March 1998	

State Administration of Religious Affairs

Name	Chinese name	Took office	Left office	Ref.
Ye Xiaowen	叶小文	March 1998	September 2009	
Wang Zuo'an	王作安	September 2009	June 2022	
Cui Maohu	崔茂虎	7 June 2022	18 March 2023	
Chen Ruifeng	陈瑞峰	20 March 2023	Incumbent	

== See also ==
- Religion in China
- Freedom of religion in China
- Antireligious campaigns of the Chinese Communist Party

=== Related PRC authorities ===
- United Front Work Department
- State Ethnic Affairs Commission

=== Similar government agencies ===
- Council for Religious Affairs (USSR)
- Ministry of Rites (imperial China)
- Bureau of Buddhist and Tibetan Affairs (Yuan dynasty)
- Constitutional Church (Revolutionary France)
- Directorate of Religious Affairs (Turkey)
