= United Front Work Department =

Chinese Communist Party body

- 中国共产党中央委员会统一战线工作部
- Emblem of the Chinese Communist Party

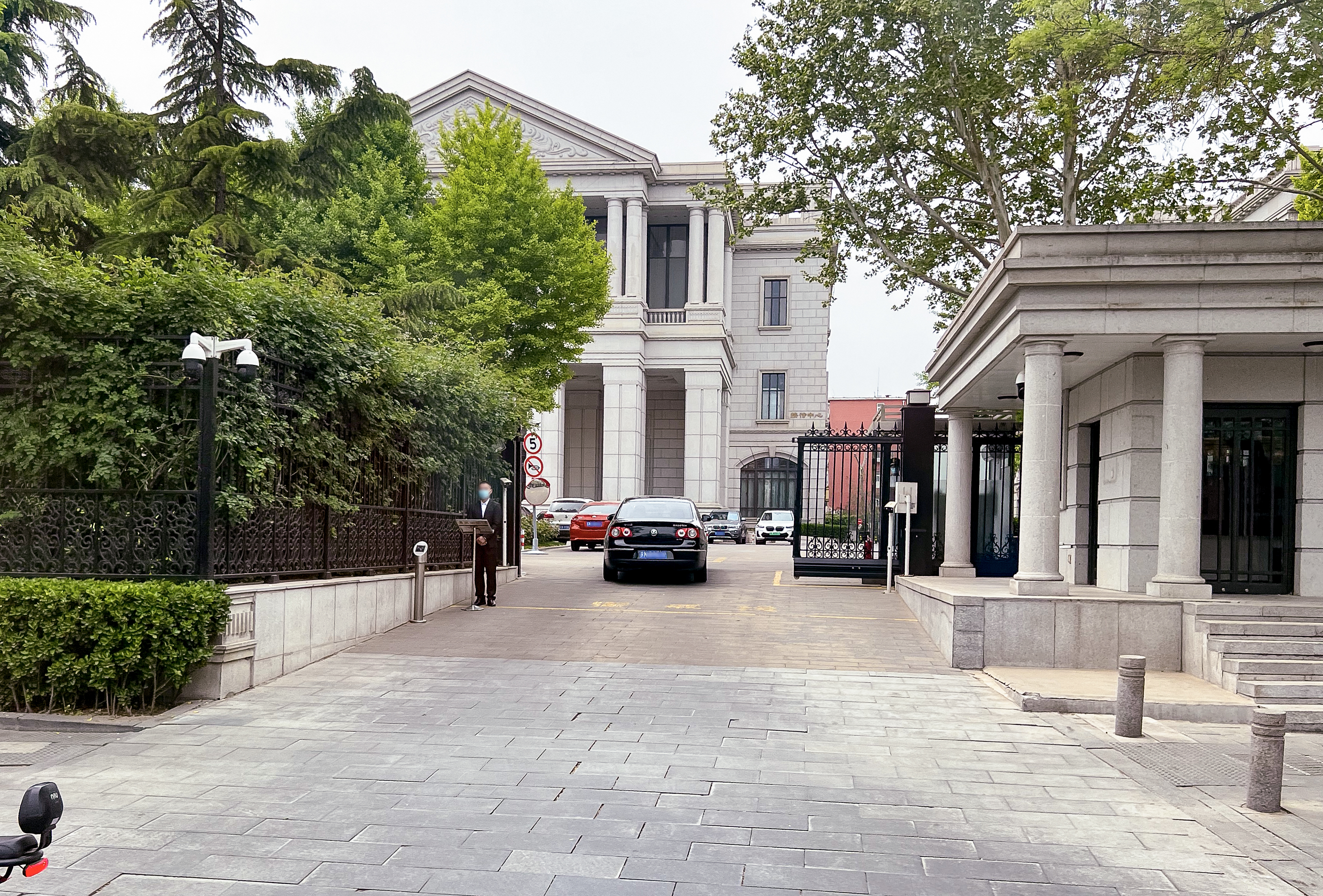
- Headquarters of the United Front Work Department

Agency overview
- Formed: 1942; 84 years ago
- Type: Department directly reporting to the Central Committee; Ministerial level agency
- Jurisdiction: Chinese Communist Party
- Headquarters: 135 Fuyou Street, Xicheng District, Beijing
- Annual budget: $2.6 billion USD (estimated in 2019)
- Minister responsible: Li Ganjie, Head
- Deputy Ministers responsible: Shen Ying, Executive Deputy Head; Chen Xu, Deputy Head; Chen Ruifeng, Deputy Head; Lin Rui, Deputy Head; Wang Ruijun, Deputy Head; Duan Yijun, Deputy Head; Ma Lihuai, Deputy Head; Liu Junchuan, Discipline Secretary
- Parent agency: Party Central Committee
- Child agencies: National Ethnic Affairs Commission; China Council for the Promotion of Peaceful National Reunification; Huaqiao University; Jinan University
- Website: www.zytzb.gov.cn

Footnotes
- * Maintains full minister-level rank

United Front Work Department
- Simplified Chinese: 中共中央统一战线工作部
- Traditional Chinese: 中共中央統一戰線工作部
Transcriptions
Standard Mandarin
- Hanyu Pinyin: Zhōnggòng Zhōngyāng Tǒngyī Zhànxiàn Gōngzuò Bù

The United Front Work Department (UFWD) is an organ of the Central Committee of the Chinese Communist Party (CCP) responsible for conducting "united front work." It manages relations with, gathers intelligence on, and attempts to gain influence over elite individuals and organizations inside and outside mainland China, including in Hong Kong, Taiwan, and in other countries.

The United Front Department was first established in 1938 following the establishment of the Second United Front with the Kuomintang during the Second Sino-Japanese War. In 1944, Central Urban Work Department was established to co-ordinate united front efforts. During the Chinese Civil War, it worked to rally as much as support for the CCP in its fight against the Kuomintang. The department was renamed to the United Front Work Department in 1948. During the Cultural Revolution, the UFWD was forced to shut down. It was re-established in 1979 under Chinese leader Deng Xiaoping. Since 2012, the role and scope of the UFWD has expanded and intensified under CCP general secretary Xi Jinping.

The UFWD is primarily responsible for managing and implementing the CCP Central Committee's guidelines and policies on the united front, specifically including work related to China's minor parties, ethnic minorities, religious affairs, the non-public sector, overseas Chinese, "new social strata," non-CCP intellectuals, as well as matters relating to Hong Kong, Macau, Taiwan, Tibet, and Xinjiang. The UFWD focuses its work on people or entities that are outside the CCP who hold political, commercial, religious, or academic influence, or who represent interest groups. Through its efforts, the UFWD seeks to ensure that these individuals and groups are supportive of or useful to CCP interests and that potential critics remain divided.

== History ==
The United Front Work Department was created during the Chinese Civil War, and was reestablished in 1979 under paramount leader Deng Xiaoping. Since 2012, the role and scope of the UFWD has expanded and intensified under CCP general secretary Xi Jinping.

=== Civil war and gaining power ===
United front policies were most used in two periods before the Chinese Communist Revolution, namely from 1924 to 1927, and from 1936 to 1945, when the CCP cooperated with the Kuomintang ostensibly to defeat the Japanese. The simplest formulation of united front work in the period was to "rally as many allies as possible in order to...defeat a common enemy." According to Mareike Ohlberg, its stated goal was to "build the broadest possible coalition with all social forces that are relevant".

In the early years, the CCP also used united front policies to cooperate with "disaffected warlords, religious believers, ethnic minorities, overseas Chinese, and minor parties and groups," in order for the CCP to appear democratic and to persuade key groups that the Nationalists were "illegitimate and repressive while the CCP embodied progress, unity, and democracy." CCP began to establish united front work departments following the establishment of the Second United Front with the Kuomintang during the Second Sino-Japanese War. In 1938, the CCP Central Committee stipulated the establishment of united front work departments under CCP committees at the district level and above. On 5 January 1939, a Central United Front Department with Wang Ming in charge was established. In May 1944, the Central Urban Work Department was established to coordinate united front efforts.

The department ceased operation following the end of the war but was re-established during the Chinese Civil War. During the war, the Urban Work Department was important in efforts to develop allies and support for the CCP, including from minor political parties, termed "democratic parties." In September 1948, the Urban Work Department was renamed to the Central United Front Work Department. Li Weihan was director of the UFWD from 1944 to 1964. Regarding religious policy, Li's view was that there were few counterrevolutionaries among religious believers, and that the majority were "patriotic". He believed that the CCP should be patient with most religious believers and work to increase their political consciousness. Li contended that the CCP should avoid harsh stances on religion, deeming harsh measures as counterproductive and damaging to the Party's credibility.

After the Chinese Civil War, the CCP continued to deploy united front strategies to train intellectuals, "and, using thought reform based on criticism, began the transformation of the old society intellectuals." This involved violent elimination of what were termed "bourgeois and idealistic political beliefs," to instill faith in "class struggle and revolutionary change." The UFWD was used in the early years of PRC rule "to guarantee CCP oversight" over groups that were not directly associated with the Party and government. Those groups, including NGOs, were brought under the authority of the UFWD, whose job it was to "continuing to play its part in mobilizing and rallying the whole people in common struggle" after the 1949 proclamation of the People's Republic of China. When the CCP "shifted its focus from the 'mass line' to 'class struggle', the real united front disappeared. While the United Front Department still existed, its duties of uniting with all forces for the 'common struggle' shifted mainly to serving the Party's leadership and 'consolidating the proletarian dictatorship'," according to Brookings Institution visiting fellow Zhang Ye.

=== Cultural Revolution ===
During the Cultural Revolution, the UFWD was accused of being "capitulationist" and forced to shut down.

=== Reform and opening up ===
In 1977, Ulanhu became head of the UFWD. In this role, he contributed to the political rehabilitation of those related to pre-Cultural Revolution policies of the UFWD, such as Li Weihan.

In the late 1970s the policy was used for the common cause of reform and opening up. From there the CCP expanded the scope of its work internationally during the reform era, and again following the 1989 Tiananmen Square protests and massacre. The department includes a bureau tasked with handling Hong Kong, Macau, Taiwan, and overseas affairs, and articulates the importance of using overseas Chinese populations to promote unification.

In 1980, the CCP Central Committee approved a request by the UFWD to create a national conference for religious groups. The participating religious groups were the Chinese Catholic Patriotic Association, the Islamic Association of China, the Chinese Taoist Association, the Three-Self Patriotic Movement, and the Buddhist Association of China.

It played an important role in building support for "one country, two systems" in Hong Kong during the 1980s and 1990s, operating under the name of the "Coordination Department." The UFWD has been critically described as serving to co-opt non-Communist community leaders outside China, and "using them to neutralize Party critics," sometimes coercively.

Scholar of Chinese political history John P. Burns presents in his book The Chinese Communist Party's Nomenklatura System excerpts from internal party documents demonstrating the role of the UFWD. The UFWD is to "implement better the party's united front policy and to assess and understand patriotic personages in different fields... so that we can arrange for correct placements for them and fully mobilize and bring into play their positive role in the Four Modernizations and to accomplish the return of Taiwan to the motherland so as to fulfill the cause of uniting the whole country, and to carry forward and solidify the revolutionary, patriotic united front."

According to Roger Faligot, the aftermath of the 1989 Tiananmen Square protests and massacre led to the "growing use of party organizations, such as the United Front Work Department and friendship associations, as fronts for intelligence operations." Based on their actions in Taiwan and elsewhere the United Front Work Department appears to be used as a cover to conduct intelligence operations against targets of interest to the CCP.

=== Xi Jinping ===
Xi Jinping has repeatedly emphasized the importance to the UFWD, adopting Mao's phrasing that "united front work" is one of the CCP's three "magic weapons".

In 2018, the UFWD was reorganized through a series of institutional reforms in which it absorbed the State Administration for Religious Affairs (SARA) and the Overseas Chinese Affairs Office (OCAO) to become two internal bureaus. As part of the "one institution with two names" system, the UFWD retains OCAO and SARA (also called National Religious Affairs Administration) as external nameplates. The UFWD also assumed direct control of the National Ethnic Affairs Commission. With the reorganization, the UFWD effectively became China's main agency overseeing and managing ethnic, religious and overseas Chinese affairs. The State Religious Affairs Commission and the State Council Overseas Chinese Office were also merged within the United Front Work Department.

In 2021, UFWD and SARA issued the directive Some Views on Managing Folk Beliefs, which provides a framework for legitimizing Chinese folk religion, which it characterizes as "folk belief". Previously, few folk religious temples were able to obtain registered legal status, often by registering as Buddhist or Daoist sites. Following the policy changes in the Xi administration, folk religion temples can register as folk belief activities sites.

In June 2026, the UFWD launched official Kuaishou and Douyin accounts called "United Front New Words."

== Structure ==
The UFWD is reported to have over 40,000 personnel and does not disclose its budget. However, various organizations under the UFWD were estimated to collectively have a budget of at least US$2.6 billion in 2019. It oversees and directs eight minor and subordinate parties and the All-China Federation of Industry and Commerce. Huaqiao University and Jinan University are directly managed by the UFWD.

=== Internal organization ===
The UFWD's bureaus reflect a broad scope of activities, covering party-related work, ethnic and religious policy implementation, Hong Kong, Macau, and overseas Chinese, non-CCP cadres and intellectuals, the private sector, Tibet, Xinjiang, as well as influential celebrities, entrepreneurs, and artists.

Between 2015 and 2018, the UFWD grew to 12 bureaus:

- General Office (办公厅): Oversees the functioning of the department, including its finances, security, assets, and work with other government and Party bodies.
- Policy and Theory Research Office (政策理论研究室): Handles ideological and policy research, internal propaganda, and the drafting of important documents. Works with other government agencies to develop propaganda efforts abroad.
- First Bureau—Party Work Bureau (党派工作局): Governs affairs related to the eight "democratic parties" legally allowed to operate in China.
- Second Bureau—Minority and Religious Work Bureau (民族工作局): Researches and recommends policy on minorities in the country, and liaises with other government agencies in their related work. Also supervises religious work.
- Third Bureau—Hong Kong, Macau and Taiwan United Front Work Bureau (港澳台统战工作局): Coordinates and communicates with friendly figures in Hong Kong, Macau, and Taiwan.
- Fourth Bureau—Non-public Economic Work Bureau (非公有制经济工作局): Coordinates with figures from the private sector.
- Fifth Bureau—Independent and Non-Party Intellectuals Work Bureau (无党派、党外知识分子工作局): Liaises with non-Party intellectuals.
- Sixth Bureau—New Social Strata Representatives Work Bureau (新的社会阶层人士工作局): Focuses on the new social strata, i.e., the rising Chinese middle class.
- Seventh Bureau: Responsible for ethnic minority and religious work, particularly as it relates to Tibet.
- Eighth Bureau: Responsible for ethnic minority and religious work, particularly as it relates to Xinjiang.
- Ninth Bureau—Overseas Chinese Affairs General Bureau (侨务综合局): Coordinates and communicates with friendly figures in overseas Chinese affairs. It runs the China Overseas Friendship Association (COFA), which merged with the China Overseas Exchange Association (COEA) in 2019.
- Tenth Bureau—Overseas Chinese Affairs Bureau (侨务事务局): Coordinates and communicates with friendly figures in overseas Chinese affairs.
- Eleventh Bureau—Religious Work General Bureau (宗教综合局): Researches and recommends policy on religious affairs in the country, and liaises with other government agencies in their related work.
- Twelfth Bureau—Religious Work Bureau (宗教业务局): Researches and recommends policy on religious affairs in the country, and liaises with other government agencies in their related work.
- Department Party Committee (机关党委)
- Retired Cadre Office (离退休干部办公室): responsible for the welfare of retired employees of the department.

=== Directly-affiliated institutions ===
The UFWD manages the following directly affiliated institutions:

- Office Service Center (Office Service Bureau)
- Beijing Taiwan Hall
- Huaxing Economic Consulting Service Center
- Cadre Training Center
- China United Front Magazine
- China Tibet Magazine
- Guangcai Career Guidance Center
- Information Center
- Taiwan Student Academic Exchange Center
- China Council for the Promotion of Peaceful National Reunification
- High-level Tibetan Buddhism College of China
- China Pali Buddhist Academy
- China Tibet Information Center
- He Xiangning Art Museum
- China News Service
- Beijing Chinese Language and Culture College
- Religious Research Center of the Central United Front Work Department
- China Religious Magazine
- Huasheng Morning Post
- Jinan University
- Huaqiao University
- International Cooperation Center

=== Directly-affiliated enterprises ===
- Religious Culture Publishing House

== Functions ==
The UFWD builds relations with non-CCP groups. It is tasked with expanding and exerting CCP influence over groups and prominent individuals which have no direct affiliation with the CCP. It engages in a diverse array of social groups including the eight minor "democratic parties" legally allowed to operate, ethnic minorities, religious groups, overseas Chinese, private entrepreneurs, professionals in emerging sectors such as social media influencers, and residents of Hong Kong, Macao, and Taiwan. It works to maintain communication and provide guidance with these groups, and often rewards the individuals within these groups that are friendly to the CCP. With these methods, the UFWD ensures their alignment with the CCP and additionally gathers policy recommendations and political intelligence. The UFWD seeks to ensure that these individuals and groups are supportive of or useful to CCP interests and that potential critics remain divided.

According to Neil Thomas of Asia Society, UFWD's work is primarily domestic, calling it a "domestic apparatus whose tentacles extend beyond China’s borders". Alex Joske has noted that there is no clear distinction between domestic and overseas UFWD activity and often overlap between the two. Scholar Martin Thorley has described the UFWD as being able to call upon a "latent network" of civic, educational, and non-governmental groups and affiliated individuals internally and abroad for its political purposes, especially in times of crisis. For instance, the UFWD uses members of the Chinese People's Political Consultative Conference and other organizations to carry out influence-building activities, often covertly. Researchers from Stanford University's Internet Observatory and the Hoover Institution describe the United Front as "cultivat[ing] pro-Beijing perspectives in the Chinese diaspora and the wider world by rewarding those it deems friendly with accolades and lucrative opportunities, while orchestrating social and economic pressure against critics. This pressure is often intense but indirect, and clear attribution is therefore difficult."

=== Operations ===
The UFWD gathers intelligence on, manages relations with, and attempts to gain influence over elite individuals and organizations inside and outside mainland China, including in Hong Kong, Taiwan, and in other countries. It uses several methods in pursuit of its goals to appeal to its targets. Its primary method involves outreach, including holding events, trainings, media tours and other similar activities. This includes examples such as inviting members of the "new social strata" to attend the "large-scale celebration to commemorate the Shenzhen Special Economic Zone’s 40th anniversary" or inviting members of the private sector to attend a multi-week training course. Another method it uses is to providing good and services, including issuing tenders for infrastructure and development projects, from road improvements to increasing access to drinking water.

The UFWD also plays an active role in the sinicization of non-Han ethnic and religious minorities, particularly in Tibet, Inner Mongolia and of the Uyghurs through the Xinjiang re-education camps. In 2020, shortly after the commencement of the 2020 Inner Mongolia protests, the UFWD issued a communique that stressed the need for all ethnic minorities in China to use Standard Chinese. The UFWD has also taken a leading role in antireligious campaigns under the official pretense of "sinicizing religions." Bureaus of the SARA, absorbed into the UFWD in 2018, in some areas of Gansu, Qinghai and Sichuan have brought PRC flags and flagpoles to install in mosques or temples.

The UFWD and its affiliated front organizations have also served as cover for intelligence agents of the Ministry of State Security. Multiple national intelligence agencies have expressed concern that the mandate and operations of the UFWD can constitute undue interference in other nations' internal affairs. In their book Nest of Spies, de Pierrebourg and Juneau-Katsuya allege that the United Front Work Department "manages important dossiers concerning foreign countries. These include propaganda, the control of Chinese students abroad, the recruiting of agents among the Chinese diaspora (and among sympathetic foreigners), and long-term clandestine operations."

The Chinese People's Association for Friendship with Foreign Countries has been described as the "public face" of the UFWD. Scholar Jichang Lulu noted that the UFWD and its proxy organizations "re-purpose democratic governance structures to serve as tools of extraterritorial influence." An Atlantic writer stated China runs thousands of linked and subsidized pro-government groups across Europe, to "ensure that its overseas citizens, and others of ethnic Chinese descent, are loyal", to "shape the conversation about China in Europe", and to "bring back technology and expertise", and that the UFWD plays a "crucial" role in this project. Scholar Jeffrey Stoff has argued that the CCP's United Front "influence apparatus intersects with or directly supports its global technology transfer apparatus."

In March 2018, it was announced that the Overseas Chinese Affairs Office would be absorbed into the United Front Work Department. With the absorption of the Overseas Chinese Affairs Office, the UFWD gained full control of the country's second largest state-run media apparatus, the China News Service. In 2019, the UFWD partnered with the Cyberspace Administration of China to promote united front work with social media influencers.

In January 2020, UFWD-linked organizations in Canada and other countries were activated to purchase, stockpile, and export personal protective equipment in response to the COVID-19 pandemic in mainland China. UFWD-affiliated groups have also been linked to organized crime in several countries.

In October 2024, Swedish reporters working as part of an international consortium of journalists identified 233 individuals across Europe connected to the united front system. The Jamestown Foundation, a Washington, D.C.-based think tank, identified 103 united front-linked groups in Sweden spanning all areas of society, including culture, business, politics, and media.

A February 2026 study by the Jamestown Foundation reported that the CCP has created a global network of individuals and organizations as part of its united front system. The report identified more than 2,000 organizations across the United States, Canada, the United Kingdom, and Germany linked to the CCP's united front work.

=== Taiwan ===
The UFWD sponsors paid trips and summer camps to mainland China for Taiwanese youth. The trips are reported to promote pro-Chinese unification sentiment.

In August 2025, Taiwan's Ministry of Education banned academic cooperation with three mainland Chinese universities—Jinan University, Huaqiao University, and Beijing Chinese Language and Culture College—due to their affiliation with the UFWD. The government also announced it would no longer recognize degrees from these institutions, citing concerns over political influence rather than academic independence.

=== Foreign electoral interference allegations ===
The UFWD has also allegedly interfered in foreign elections, including the 2019 Canadian federal election. Following the 2019 Canadian Parliament infiltration plot, the Privy Council Office warned that election interference by China was "likely to be more persistent and pervasive in future elections" and that "the UFWD's extensive network of quasi-official and local community and interest groups, allow it to obfuscate communication and the flow of funds between Canadian targets and Chinese officials."

== Reaction ==
A 2018 report by the United States–China Economic and Security Review Commission noted that the UFWD regularly attempts to suppress overseas protests and acts of expression critical of the CCP are a conspiracy against rights. In May 2020, the White House released a report titled "U.S. Strategic Approach to the People's Republic of China". That report stated that "CCP United Front organizations and agents target businesses, universities, think tanks, scholars, journalists, and local, state, and Federal officials in the United States and around the world, attempting to influence discourse and restrict external influence inside the PRC." In June 2020, the Australian Strategic Policy Institute issued a report advocating a multi-dimensional response involving law enforcement as well as legislative reform for greater transparency of foreign influence operations. The same month the Republican Study Committee in the United States called for sanctions on the UFWD and its top leadership.

In January 2022, MI5 issued an "interference alert" for a solicitor in the U.K. named Christine Lee suspected of political interference on behalf of the UFWD. In a February 2022 ruling, a Canadian court stated that the UFWD's Overseas Chinese Affairs Office "engages in covert and surreptitious intelligence gathering". In July 2023, a group of U.S. senators asked the United States Department of Justice to investigate "Overseas Chinese Service Centers" with alleged ties to the UFWD that are operating in seven U.S. cities.

=== U.S. sanctions and prosecution ===
In December 2020, the United States Department of State imposed visa restrictions on "individuals active in United Front Work Department activities, who have engaged in the use or threat of physical violence, theft and release of private information, espionage, sabotage, or malicious interference in domestic political affairs, academic freedom, personal privacy, or business activity." In January 2021, the head of the UFWD, You Quan, was sanctioned pursuant to Executive Order 13936 as a Specially Designated National by United States Department of the Treasury's Office of Foreign Assets Control.

In May 2023, a U.S. man, Liang Litang, was indicted for acting as an illegal agent of the Chinese government and for surveilling and harassing Chinese dissidents. Liang allegedly passed information to officials of the UFWD and Ministry of Public Security.

== See also ==
- United front (China)
- Friendly Parties Department of the SED Central Committee
- List of political parties in the People's Republic of China
